= History of the English penny (1154–1485) =

The history of the English penny from 1154 to 1485 covers the period of the House of Plantagenet, up to the Battle of Bosworth Field which brought about the beginning of the Tudor period. The Plantagenet era saw an overall rise in quality of the coinage but saw a decline in the number of mints used to produce coins.

The first years of the reign of Henry II saw no change in the production of coins from the reign of Stephen, until the Tealby penny was introduced, minted from 1158 to 1180. These coins' weight and quality of silver were good, but the overall production was poor; as a result, in 1180 the short-cross penny was introduced.

The coinage during the reigns of Richard I and John remained largely unchanged. In 1247, under Henry III, the long-cross penny replaced the short-cross penny to deter clipping. In 1279 Edward I began a new coinage which was admired and imitated on the continent, and included the introduction of the farthing, halfpenny and groat, as well as making clipping easier to detect. This design remained similar throughout the reigns of Edward II and Edward III, with the addition of the quarter noble, half noble and noble in the latter's reign.

During the Wars of the Roses, Henry VI's administration kept a sufficient supply of coins in circulation, with many designs and variations of the penny minted. Henry would later be overthrown by Edward IV, who was in turn succeeded by Edward V, with Richard, Duke of Gloucester acting as Lord Protector. Richard became king in 1483 with only a small number of coins minted in his name, and was defeated at the Battle of Bosworth Field by Henry VII in 1485.

== The Plantagenets (1154–1485) ==
=== Henry II ===
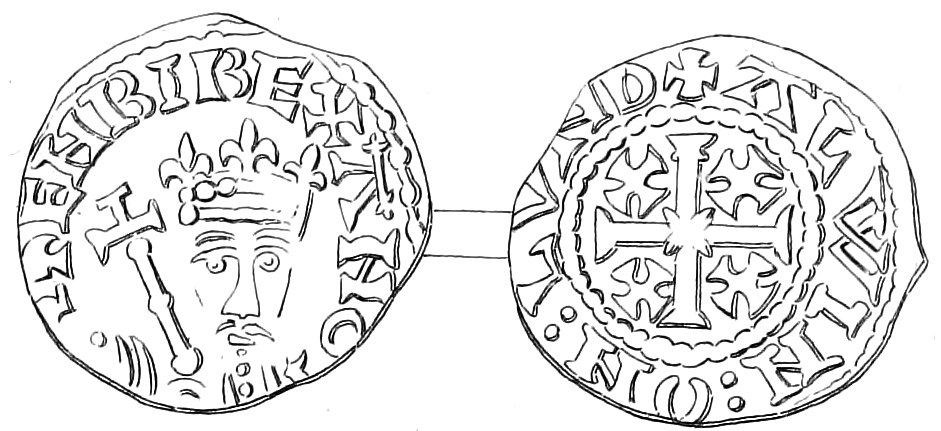
Penny of Henry II with "cross-and-crosslets" design on the obverse.

Henry II ascended the throne in 1154 as the first of the Plantagenet dynasty. For the first few years of his reign the coins of Stephen continued to be produced, but in order to restore public confidence in the currency a new standard was introduced: the Tealby penny, so named after a hoard of such coins was found at Tealby, Lincolnshire in 1807. A total of 30 mints were employed in the initial recoinage (the mint at Ipswich was not active during the early stages – but was extremely productive from class B until the end of the series). The mints in operation at the beginning of the recoinage were: Bedford, Bristol, Bury St Edmunds, Canterbury, Carlisle, Chester, Colchester, Durham, Exeter, Gloucester, Hereford, Ilchester, Launceston, Leicester, Lincoln, London, Newcastle, Northampton, Norwich, Oxford, Pembroke, Salisbury, Shrewsbury, Stafford, Thetford, Wallingford, Wilton, Winchester, and York. However, once the recoinage was completed only 12 mints were allowed to remain active. This marked the beginning of the gradual decline in the number of mints used to strike English coins.

While the Tealby coinage was acceptable in terms of weight and silver quality, the overall quality of production was quite poor. To remedy this, in 1180 a new style of coin, the short-cross penny, was introduced. This style remained largely unchanged until 1247, which gave both the coinage and the state a sense of stability. The practice of placing the moneyer's name and mint on the reverse continued, though the reduction in the number of mints enabled better quality control to be applied. The Tealby coins bear the obverse inscriptions HENRI REX ANG, HENRI REX AN, HENRI R ANG, HENRI REX, HENRI REX A, or HENRI REX – Henry King of England, or King Henry, while the short-cross pennies are inscribed HENRICUS REX. Short-cross coins were minted at Carlisle, Exeter, Lincoln, London, Northampton, Norwich, Oxford, Wilton, Winchester, Worcester, and York.

=== Richard I and John ===
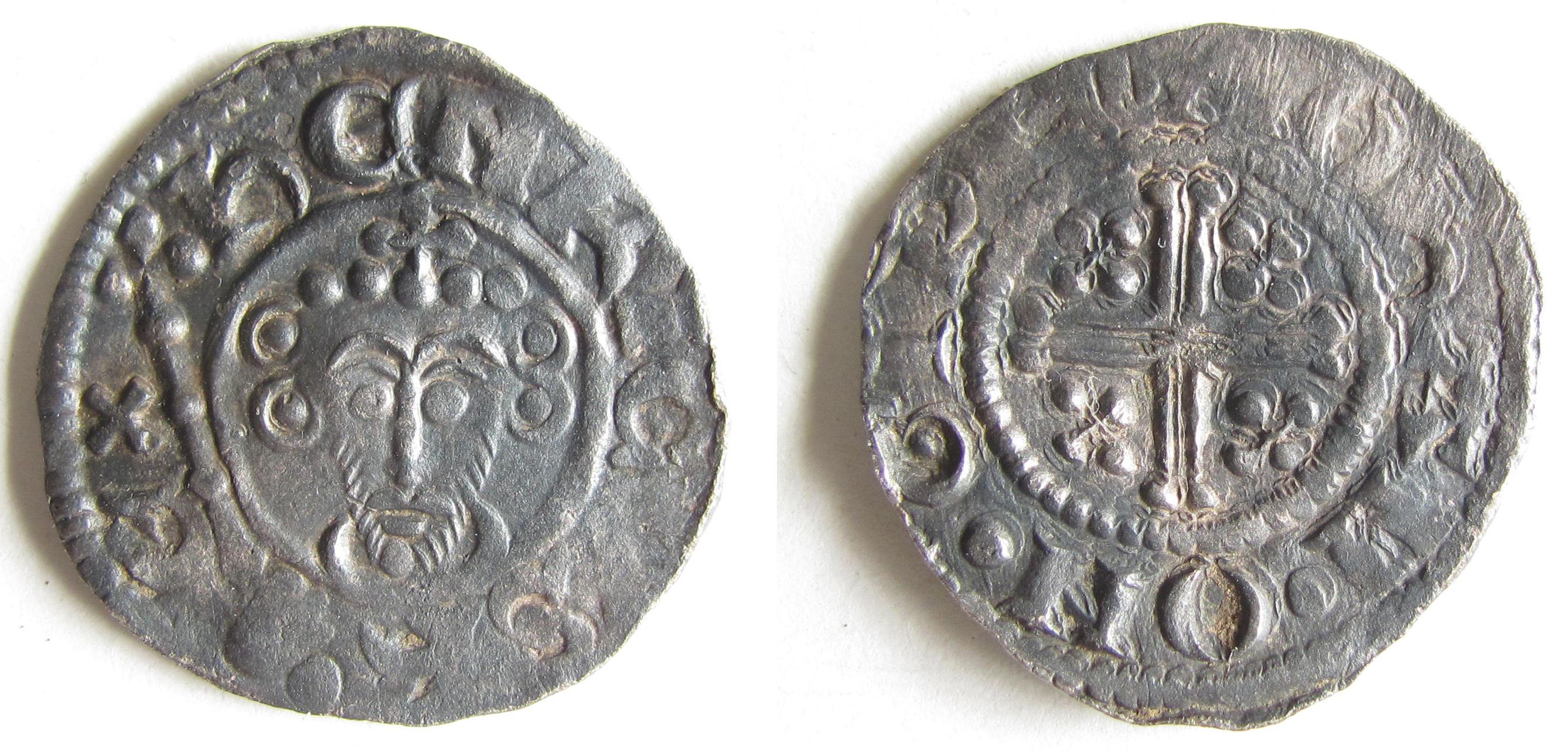
Silver penny of King John, 1205–1207.

During the reign of King Richard I (1189–1199) the short-cross coinage continued unchanged, even to the extent of still being inscribed HENRICUS REX. Ricardian coins were minted at Canterbury, Carlisle, Durham, Exeter, Lichfield, Lincoln, London, Northampton, Norwich, Shrewsbury, Winchester, Worcester, and York.

King John's coins (1199–1216) continued the short-cross series, still inscribed HENRICUS REX. John's coins were minted at Bury St Edmunds, Canterbury, Carlisle, Chichester, Durham, Exeter, Ipswich, King's Lynn, Lincoln, London, Northampton, Norwich, Oxford, Rhuddlan (although many of the short-cross coins minted there were doubtless imitative issues by Llywelyn ap Iorwerth, prince of Wales, John's son-in-law), Rochester, Winchester, and York.

=== Henry III ===
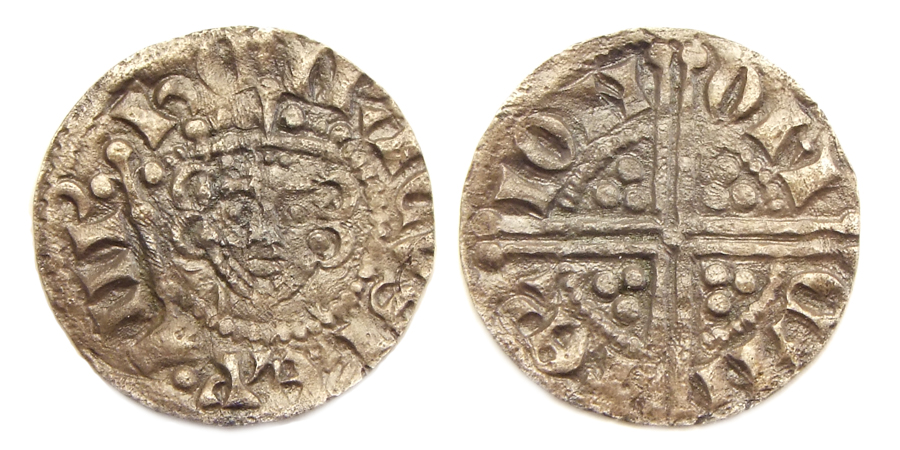
Example of the new Long cross penny with bust of Henry III.

In King Henry III's long reign (1216–1272) the short-cross penny continued in use until 1247. By then, however, through no fault of the moneyers' there was a problem in that many of the coins in circulation were underweight. This was caused by the illegal practice of clipping silver off the edge of the coin, which was made easier by the cross on the reverse not extending to the rim thus giving people no clear indication of exactly how big the coin was supposed to be. In 1247 therefore, a new long-cross penny replaced the short-cross coin, which made it more obvious when the coin had been clipped. Apart from the change in the size of the cross, the rest of the design did not substantially change, and the long cross made it easy to cut the coin into halves or quarters for change. Because of the introduction of the new coinage, it was necessary to reopen many of the old mints to supply sufficient coins. Short-cross Henry III pennies were minted at Bury St Edmunds, Canterbury, Durham, London, Winchester and York. Long-cross pennies were produced at Bristol, Bury St Edmunds, Canterbury, Carlisle, Durham, Exeter, Gloucester, Hereford, Ilchester, Lincoln, London, Newcastle, Northampton, Norwich, Oxford, Shrewsbury, Wallingford, Wilton, Winchester, and York.

The inscription on the short-cross penny was still HENRICUS REX, while the long-cross pennies were variously inscribed HENRICUS REX TERCI, HENRICUS REX III ("King Henry the Third"), while one issue unpopularly omitted the moneyer's name, instead having HENRICUS REX on the obverse and ANGLIE TERCI ("of England the Third") on the reverse, while another issue had HENRICUS REX ANG on the obverse and continued on the reverse with LIE TERCI LON (or CAN or AED) indicating it was minted in London or Canterbury or Bury St Edmunds (from the variant Latin spelling Aedmundi).

=== Edwardian coins ===
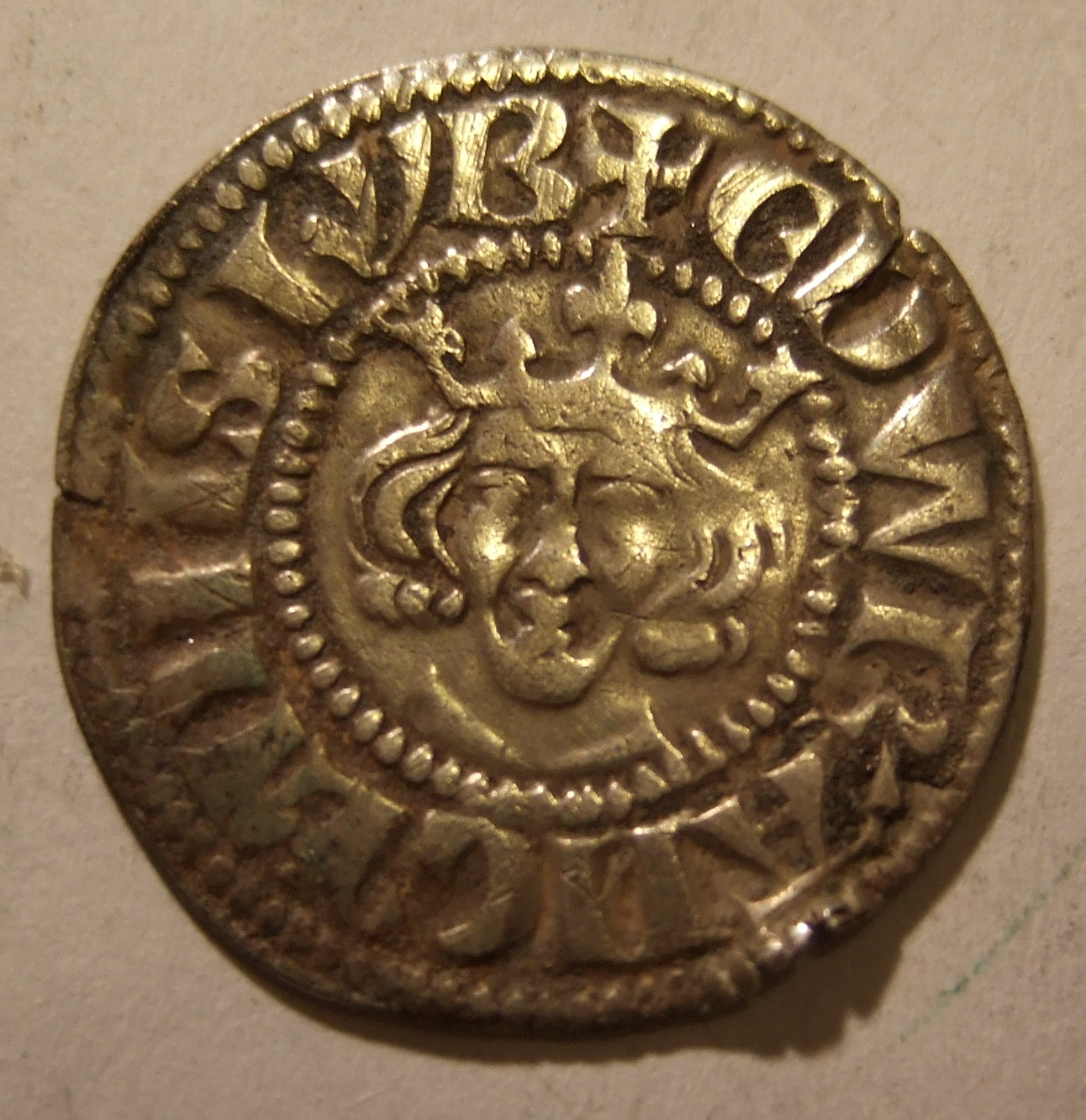
Edward I Penny, minted: London Only, Class: 2a, Year Minted: 1280.

Edward I (1272–1307) succeeded his father while on Crusade in the Holy Land. Coin production had to continue while the king made his two-year journey home, so long-cross pennies inscribed HENRICUS REX III continued to be produced at the Bury St Edmunds, Durham, and London mints. As Edward made his way home, he concluded an important wool-trade treaty in the Netherlands, which indicated the importance of foreign trade at that time. He also acknowledged the need to improve the style and fineness of English coins to avoid the poor-quality coins which had sometimes appeared during earlier reigns and shaken public confidence in the currency. There was also a need for larger and smaller denominations since the penny had not changed much in 500 years, so the groat (4d), halfpenny, and farthing were successfully introduced. Finally, there was the problem of clipping, for which the Jews were blamed.

In response to all these pressures, a completely new coinage was struck in 1279 with a different design which made clipping much easier to detect. Millions of coins were struck at London and Canterbury and the public could take their old, underweight short- and long-cross pennies to the mint and exchange them for new coins of the correct weight and fineness. This exchange also served as a form of taxation as moneyers were required to charge a fee for the service. The new coins were much admired in Europe and were extensively copied there, often with poorer fineness silver – but this only made Edward's coins even more popular and severely drained the local supply of silver such that the export of English coins was forbidden in 1299. The strong, good-quality coins strengthened the economy and brought prosperity to the country. The 1279 penny was different from earlier issues in many ways. The king's bust is more lifelike, facing the front, and the legend on the obverse is longer, usually EDW REX ANGL DNS HYB – Edward King of England Lord of Ireland. The reverse had a long cross going to the edge of the coin; the moneyer's name is omitted except for one issue, but the name of the mint is usually given in full, e.g., CIVITAS LONDON City of London, or VILLA NOVI CASTRI Town of Newcastle. The new coins also contained a privy mark, small differences such as a rose on the king's breast, differences in the king's hair style, or an alteration in the size of the king's eyes, or the style of a letter; these differences were not caused by carelessness but to enable identification of the moneyer who produced the coin, in place of giving the moneyer's name.

The crockards, pollards, and rosaries minted in Europe as debased forms of Edward's penny were first accepted as the legal equivalents of halfpence and then banned as counterfeit. The treasurer and justiciar of Ireland, Archbishop Stephen de Fulbourn, had permitted the use of similarly debased Dutch shillings as equivalent to pence. These became known as steepings, scaldings, and Bishop's money but were also banned, as were leonines, mitres, and eagles named for the images they bore.

Coins of Edward II (1307–1327) were deliberately made very similar to those of his father. Edward I coins were minted at Berwick-upon-Tweed, Bristol, Bury St Edmunds, Canterbury, Chester, Durham, Exeter, Kingston-upon-Hull, Lincoln, London, Newcastle, Reading, and York. Edward II coins were only minted at Berwick, Bury St Edmunds, Canterbury, Durham, and London.

Edward III (1327–1377) succeeded his father at the age of 14. His reign was a period of conflict with Scotland and France, which is reflected in his coins. In the first part of Edward's reign only a small quantity of pennies was produced, in a similar style to those of his father. New gold coins – the noble, half noble, and the quarter noble – were introduced, followed later by the silver groat or fourpence which became very popular and eventually superseded the penny in importance, together with the half groat which was also popular. Together with the production of half pennies and farthings, England had at last an adequate supply of varying denominations which benefited both internal trade and trade with other countries in Europe where English coins were readily accepted.

Edward III's first coinage, between 1327 and 1335, is very similar to the Edward I and II pennies, with the inscription EDWAR ANGL DNS HYB around a front-facing bust of the king; these pennies were minted in London, Bury St Edmunds, Canterbury, Durham, York, and Berwick upon Tweed. No more pennies were minted until his third, or florin, coinage in 1344–1351 (so-called because the dies were made by two craftsmen from Florence). In this coinage the king's hairstyle appears to be much longer and more unkempt. These coins were produced in London, Canterbury, Durham, Reading, and York. During the period of Edward's fourth coinage (1351–1377) politics affected the inscription on most coins, but to a lesser extent on the penny than on the larger coins, due to the lack of available space. Edward claimed the throne of France, but the Treaty of Brétigny in 1360 granted him land in France; on some coins, but not the penny, his overlordship of Aquitaine is recognised. After the treaty was repudiated by the French in 1369 the claim to France was reinstated and England and France went to war again, though England lost most of its French possessions except Calais and Bordeaux. Pre-treaty pennies were minted in London, Durham and York, with the obverse legend EDWARDUS REX ANGLI. During the Treaty period the Durham and York mints continued to mint pennies with that inscription, while ones produced by the London and Calais mints were inscribed EDWARD ANGL R DNS HYB. During the post-treaty period the Durham and York mints became ecclesiastical mints, under the authority of the local bishop or archbishop, and thus a source of money for the Church. Typical inscriptions of this period are EDWARD R ANGL FRANC, EDWARDUS REX ANGLIE FR, EDWARD REX ANGL FR – Edward King of England and France.

=== Richard II ===
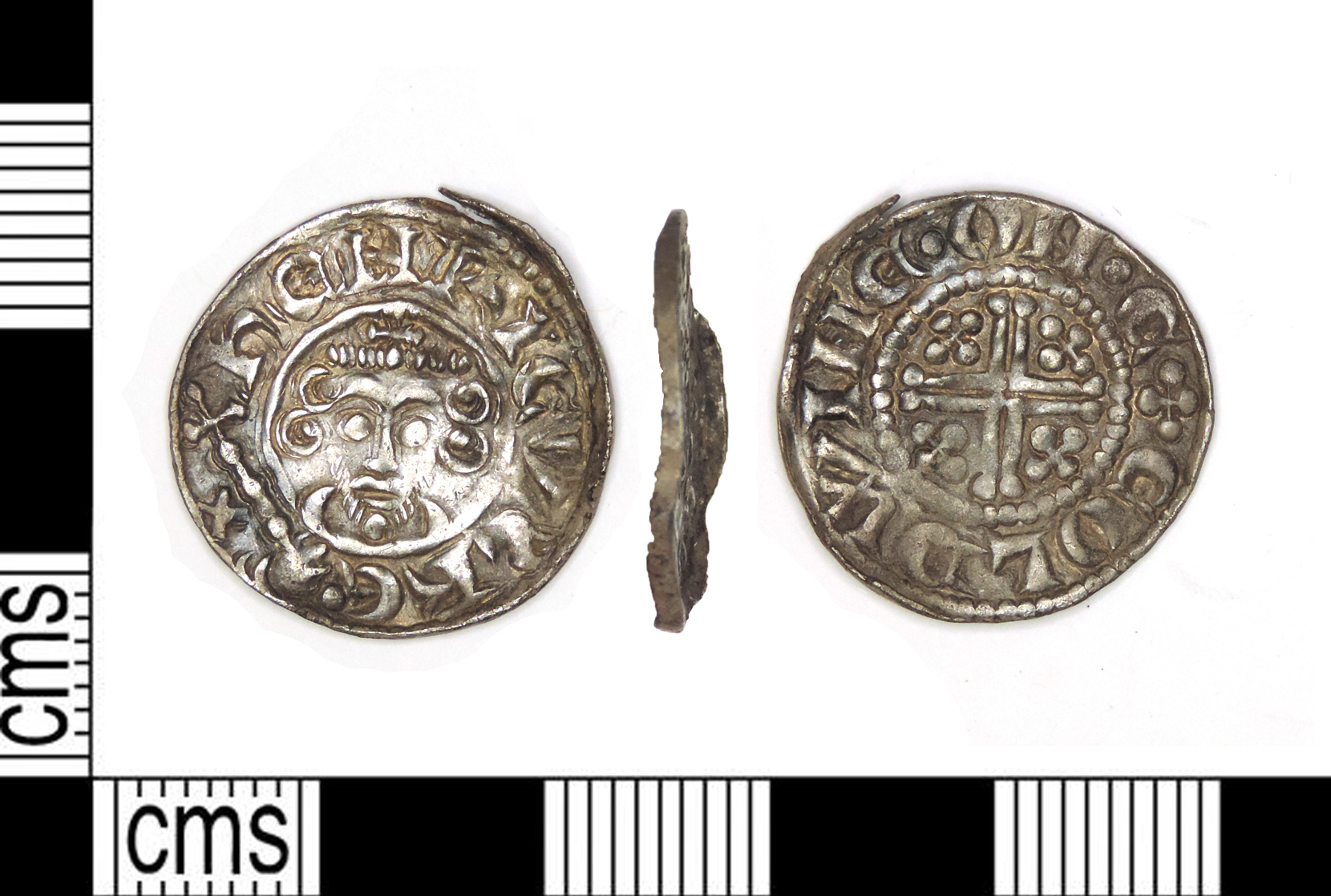
"Short cross" penny of Richard II, minted in Canterbury

Edward III's son, the Black Prince, died in 1376, a year before his father, which meant that the next king was Edward's eleven-year-old grandson Richard II (1377–1399). England continued to lay claim to France and remained at war until 1396; high taxation to pay for the war caused several peasant uprisings. During this period large quantities of inferior quality European coins circulated alongside the high-quality English coins, producing a real-life example of Gresham's law as English coins were smuggled to the continent to be melted down, alloyed with other metals and remanufactured as fake pennies and returned to England. Pennies were produced at London, York and Durham, and inscribed RICARDUS REX ANGLIE, RICARDUS REX ANGLE Z FRANC, RICARDUS REX ANGLIE Z, RICARD REX ANGL Z FRANC, RICARD REX ANGLIE or RICARDUS REX ANGL Z F.

=== Lancastrians and Yorkists ===
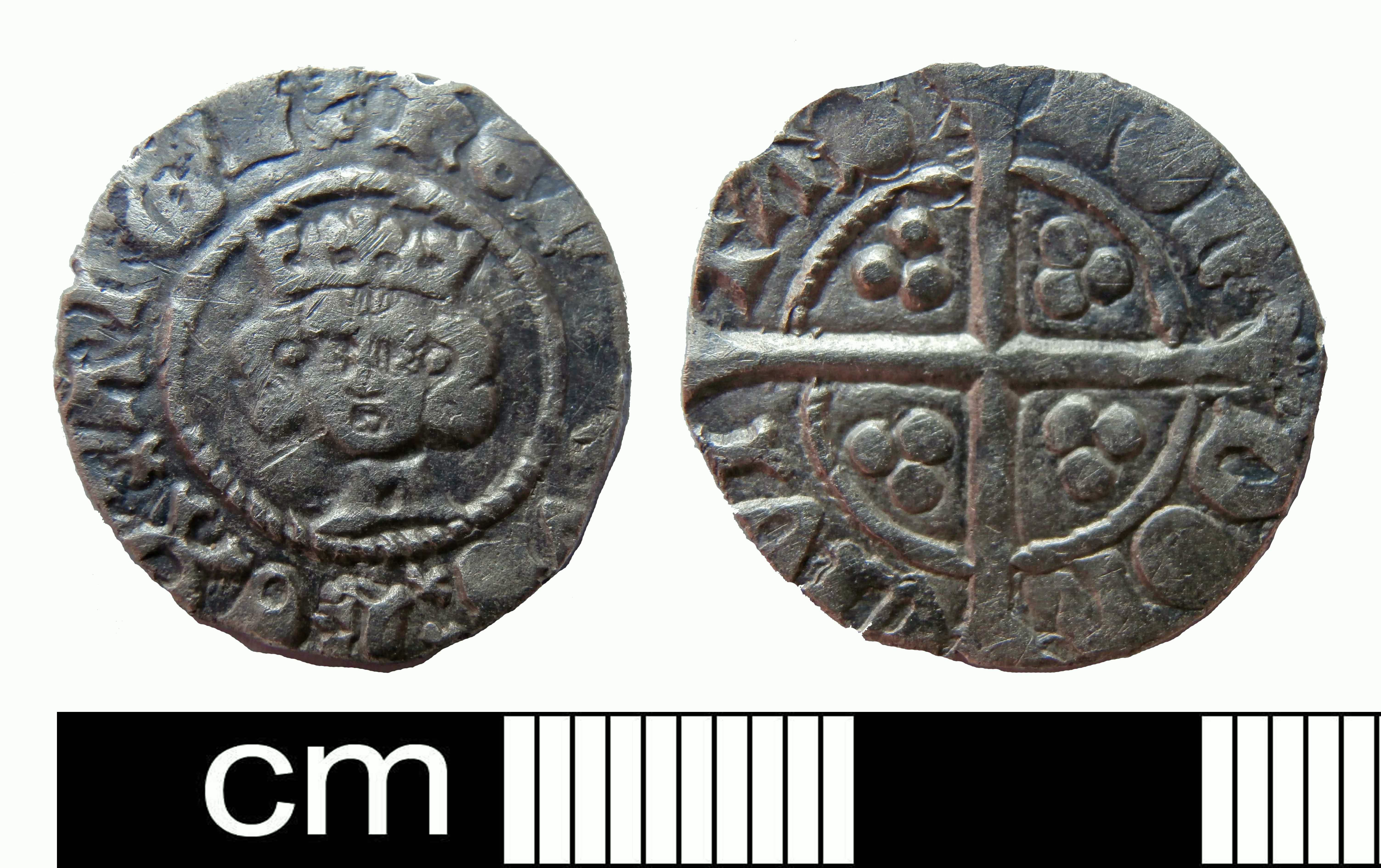
Henry IV penny

In 1399, Henry, Duke of Lancaster – another grandson of Edward III – overthrew his cousin and ruled as Henry IV (1399–1413). This was a turbulent time with wars being fought in both Scotland and Wales, and the coinage problems of the previous reign continued; the price of silver and gold was low in England compared to Europe, and coins were illegally smuggled abroad, causing major problems in England as not only were there insufficient coins in circulation, but the mints could not buy enough bullion to make new coins. Henry IV's pennies are divided into heavy coinage (prior to 1412), when the weight of the coins had not been adjusted to reflect the continental price of silver, and the light coinage of 1412–13 when the silver content was reduced to correspond to the continental price of silver, thus putting an end to the illegal export of English coinage. The heavy coinage was minted at London and York, inscribed HENRIC DI GRA REX ANGL – Henry by the Grace of God King of England, while the light coinage was minted at London, York, and Durham, inscribed HENRIC REX ANGLIE.

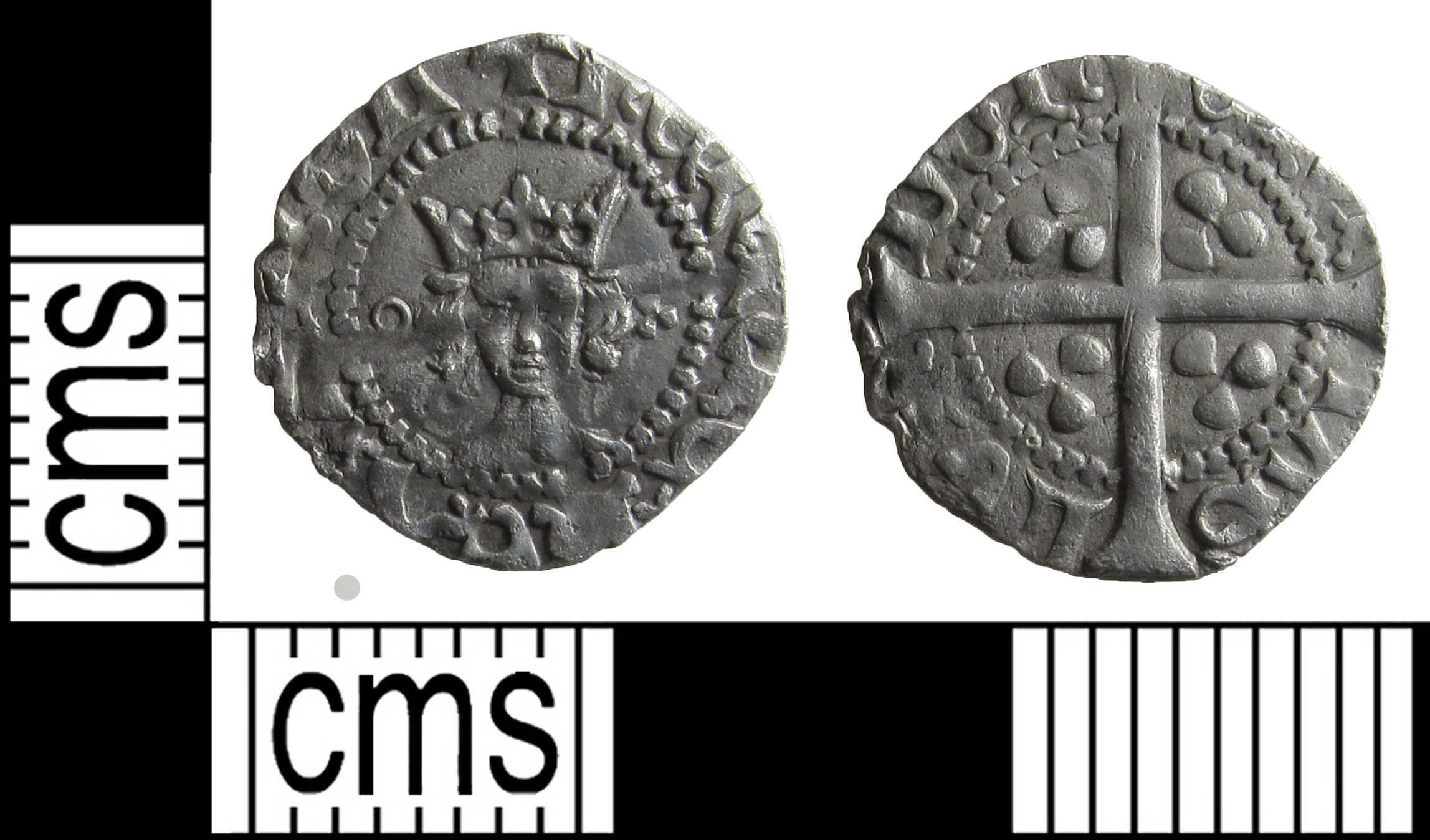
Henry V penny

Henry V (1413–1422) continued his father's light coinage, with similar inscriptions on the coins produced at London, Durham, and York.

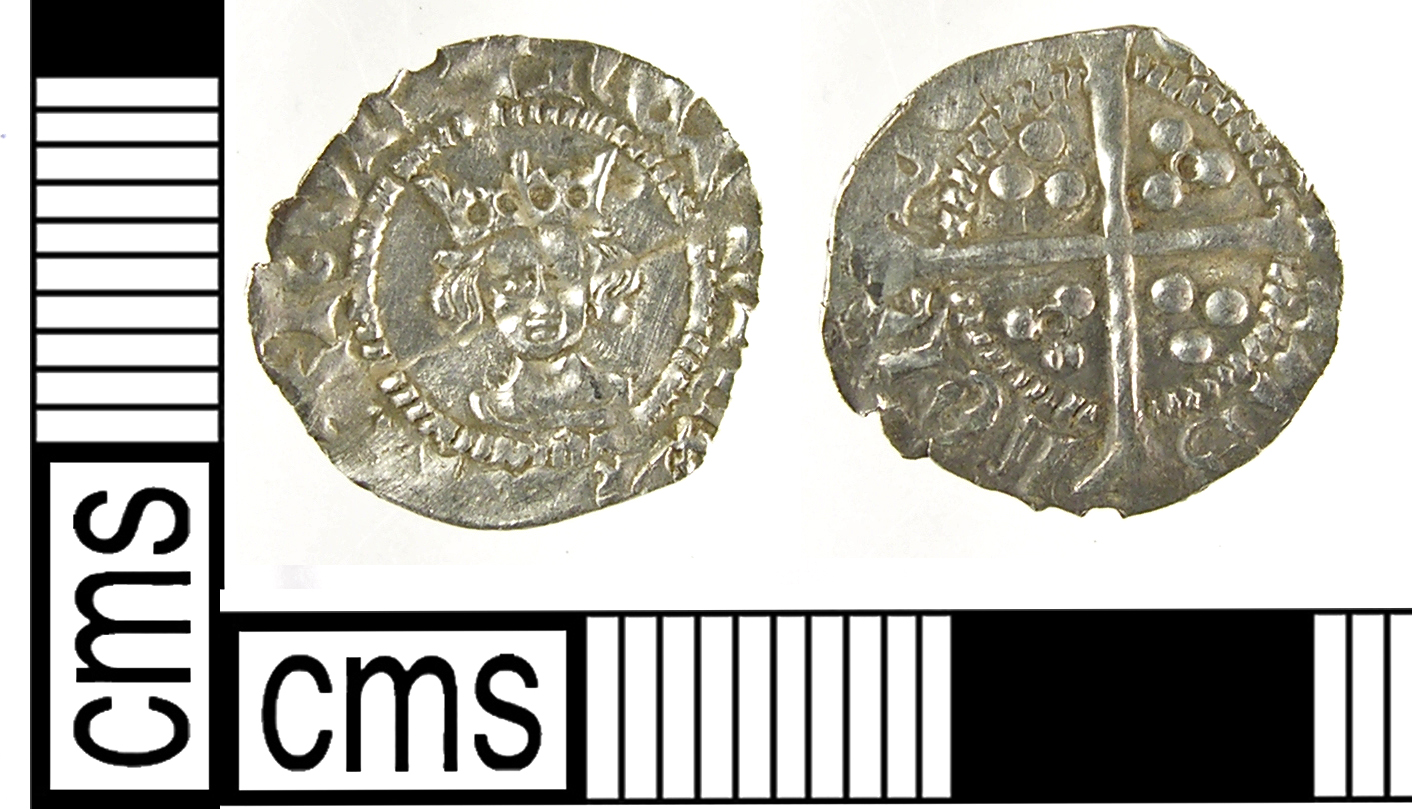
Henry VI penny

Henry VI (1422–1461, 1470–1471) came to the throne as an infant. He favoured making peace with France, but his heir, Richard, Duke of York, a descendant of the second son of Edward III, favoured war; this disagreement precipitated the outbreak of the Wars of the Roses between his supporters, the Lancastrians (red rose), and those of the Yorkists (white rose). The nobility attached itself to one side or the other (and often changed sides), but eventually in 1461 Henry was defeated by Richard's son, who became King Edward IV; Henry was incarcerated in the Tower of London for nine years, but the wars continued and in October 1470 Edward was forced to flee to the continent and Henry was restored to the throne. This restoration was only brief, however, as Edward mustered more support and after two battles at Barnet and Tewkesbury Edward was back on the throne in April 1471 where he stayed until his death in 1483. Henry was returned to the Tower, where he was murdered the same night.

Despite the upheavals of the time, Henry VI's administration maintained an adequate supply of coinage throughout the first reign. There were several different issues of pennies distinguished by different features such as rosettes or pinecones appearing in the legend, or a leaf appearing on the king's breast, etc. The normal inscription was HENRICUS REX ANGLIE. Pennies were minted at London, Calais, York, and Durham.

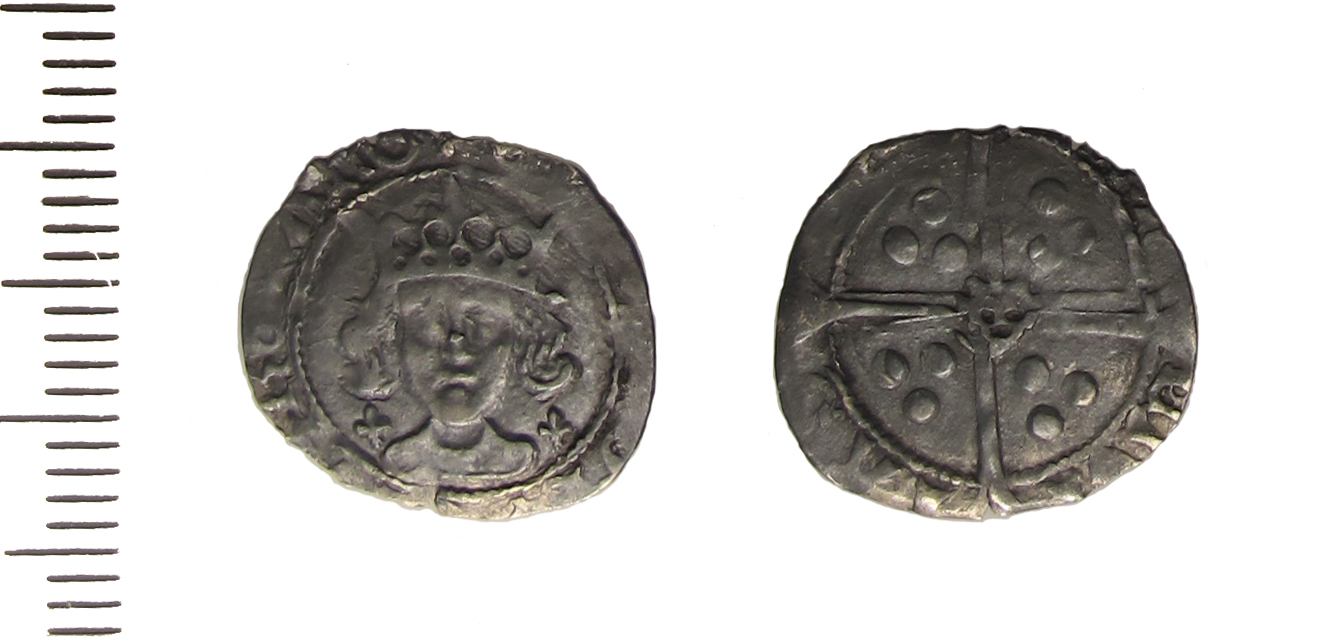
Edward IV penny

During Edward IV's first reign the problem of English coins' face value being worth less than their metal value in Europe recurred. In 1464 Edward acted to solve the problem by reducing the weight of all silver coins by about 20%: the heavy penny issued between 1461 and 1464 weighed 15 grains (1.0 gram) and was minted at London, York, and Durham; the light penny weighed 12 grains (0.8 gram) and was minted in London, Bristol, Canterbury, Durham, and York. They were all inscribed EDWARD DI GRA REX ANGL.

Despite the short duration of Henry VI's second reign, pennies were produced in similar style to the first reign at London, Bristol, and York. Edward IV's second reign pennies are basically continuations of his first reign, produced at the same mints. By this time all reigns used mintmarks on their coins to identify the moneyers.

Edward IV died suddenly in 1483 and was succeeded by his twelve-year-old son Edward V. In the turbulent times it became known that there was some problem with the legality of Edward IV's marriage, and rather than let Edward be king with a regency, Parliament deposed him and appointed Edward IV's brother Richard, Duke of Gloucester as King Richard III. Edward and his younger brother Richard, Duke of York, were taken to the Tower of London, and the Princes in the Tower were never seen again. Who was responsible for their ultimate fate remains a topic of heated discussion to this day. There is evidence that some coins were struck for King Edward V, but it is uncertain that any have survived.

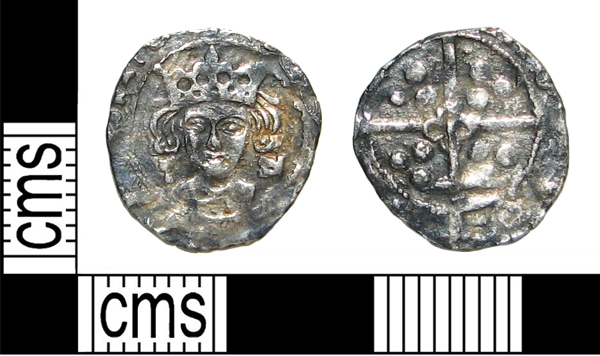
Richard III penny, minted in York by Archbishop Thomas Rotherham

Richard III (1483–1485) was the last of the Plantagenet kings. Before his demise at the Battle of Bosworth Field, pennies were produced for him, inscribed RICARD DEI GRA REX ANGL, at London, York and Durham, but they are very rare – only one penny is known which was produced in the London mint.
