= Farthing (British coin) =

Former coin of the United Kingdom and other territories

- United Kingdom
- Value: 1/4d sterling (Note: "d" was the symbol representing an old penny. A farthing has the equivalent nominal value of ~£0.001042, or just over 1/10 of a new penny.)
- Mass: 2.83 g
- Diameter: 20.19 mm
- Thickness: 0.666 mm
- Edge: Plain
- Composition: Bronze, earlier just copper
- Years of minting: 1860–1956

Obverse
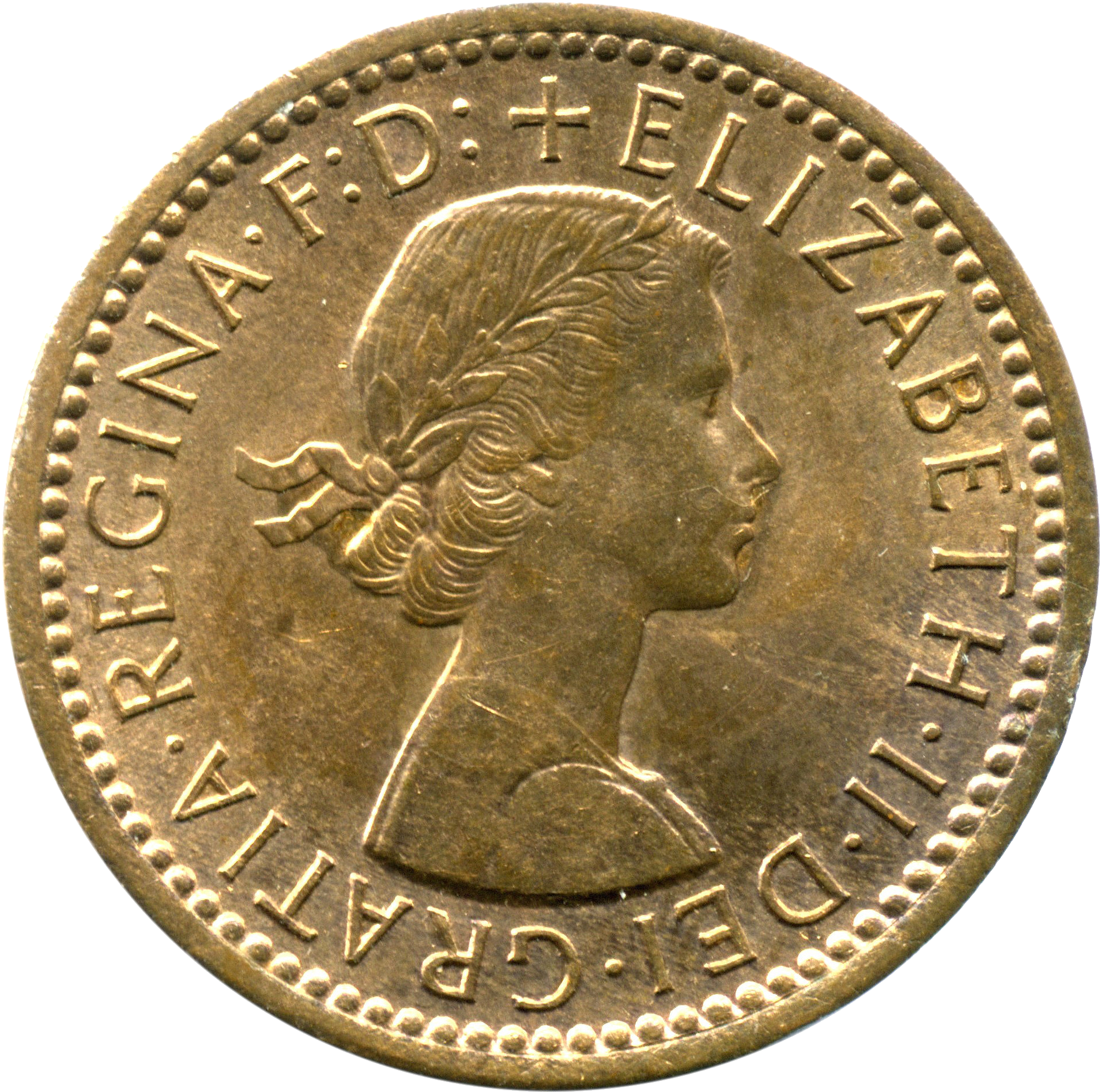
- Design: Elizabeth II
- Designer: Mary Gillick
- Design date: 1953

Reverse
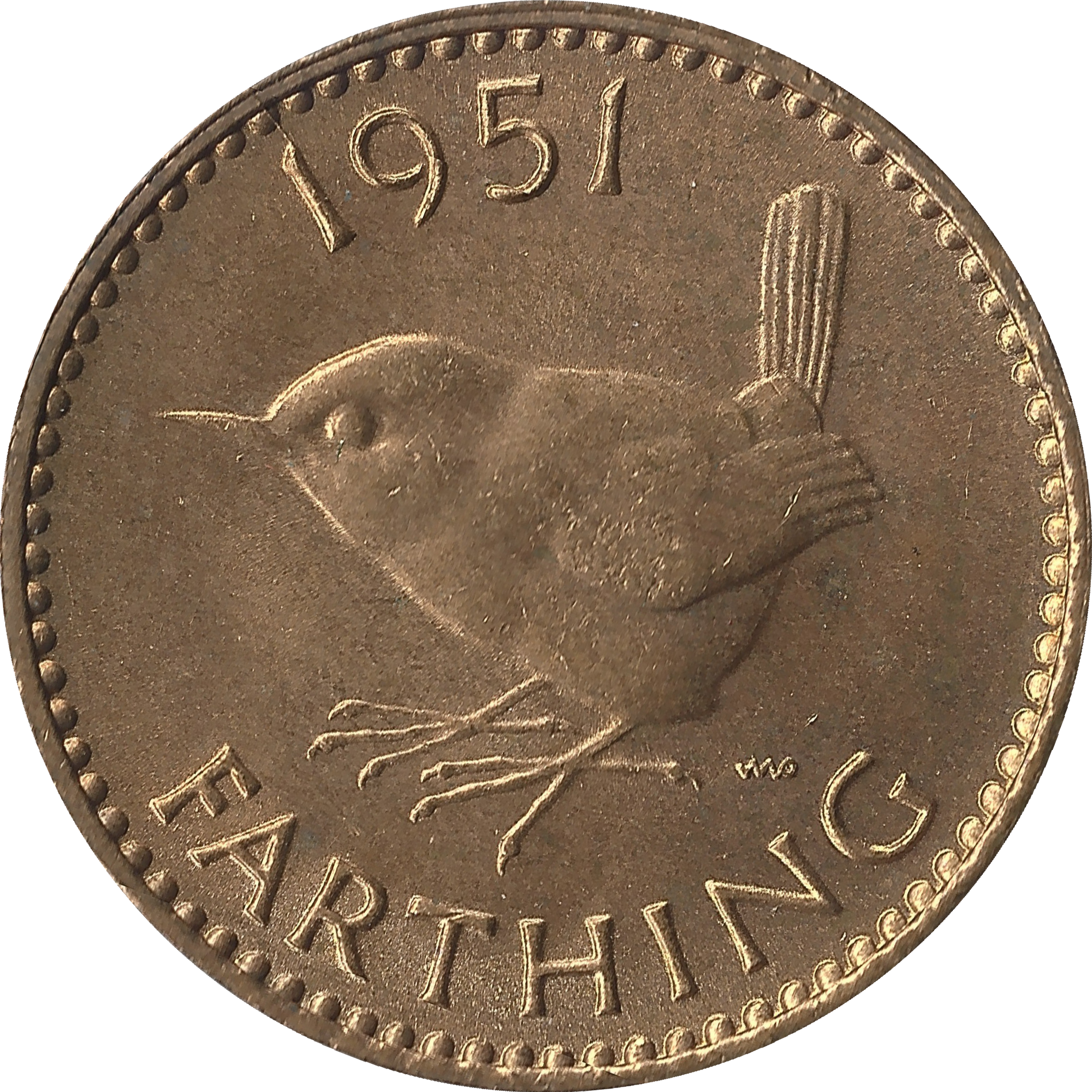
- Design: Wren (Britannia on earlier mintages)
- Designer: Harold Wilson Parker
- Design date: 1937

The farthing (from Old English: fēorðing or feorþung; lit. "a fourth") was a denomination of sterling coinage worth 1/4 of an old penny, or 1/960 of a pound. This is an equivalent face value of around 1/10 of a new penny. Initially minted in copper, and then in bronze, it replaced the earlier English farthing and was minted until 1956.

Between 1860 and 1971, the farthing's purchasing power ranged between £0.12 and £0.20 in 2017 values. The farthing's reverse bore an image of Britannia until 1937, when a wren was introduced. As with all British coins, the obverse bore the image of the reigning monarch. The farthing ceased to be legal tender in the United Kingdom on 1 January 1961.

== History ==
A British copper farthing succeeded the English farthing after England and Scotland were united into the Kingdom of Great Britain in 1707, although not immediately. Under Queen Anne, a small number of pattern farthings were struck, but none for circulation, as so many English farthings from previous reigns were still available. Some British copper farthings were struck in the reigns of George I and George II. By the accession of George III, in 1760, many counterfeits were in circulation, and the Royal Mint stopped minting copper coins in 1775. The next farthings were the first struck by steam power, in 1799 by Matthew Boulton at his Soho Mint, under licence. Boulton coined more in 1806, and the Royal Mint resumed production in 1821. The farthing was struck regularly under George IV and William IV, by then with a design very like a smaller version of the penny.

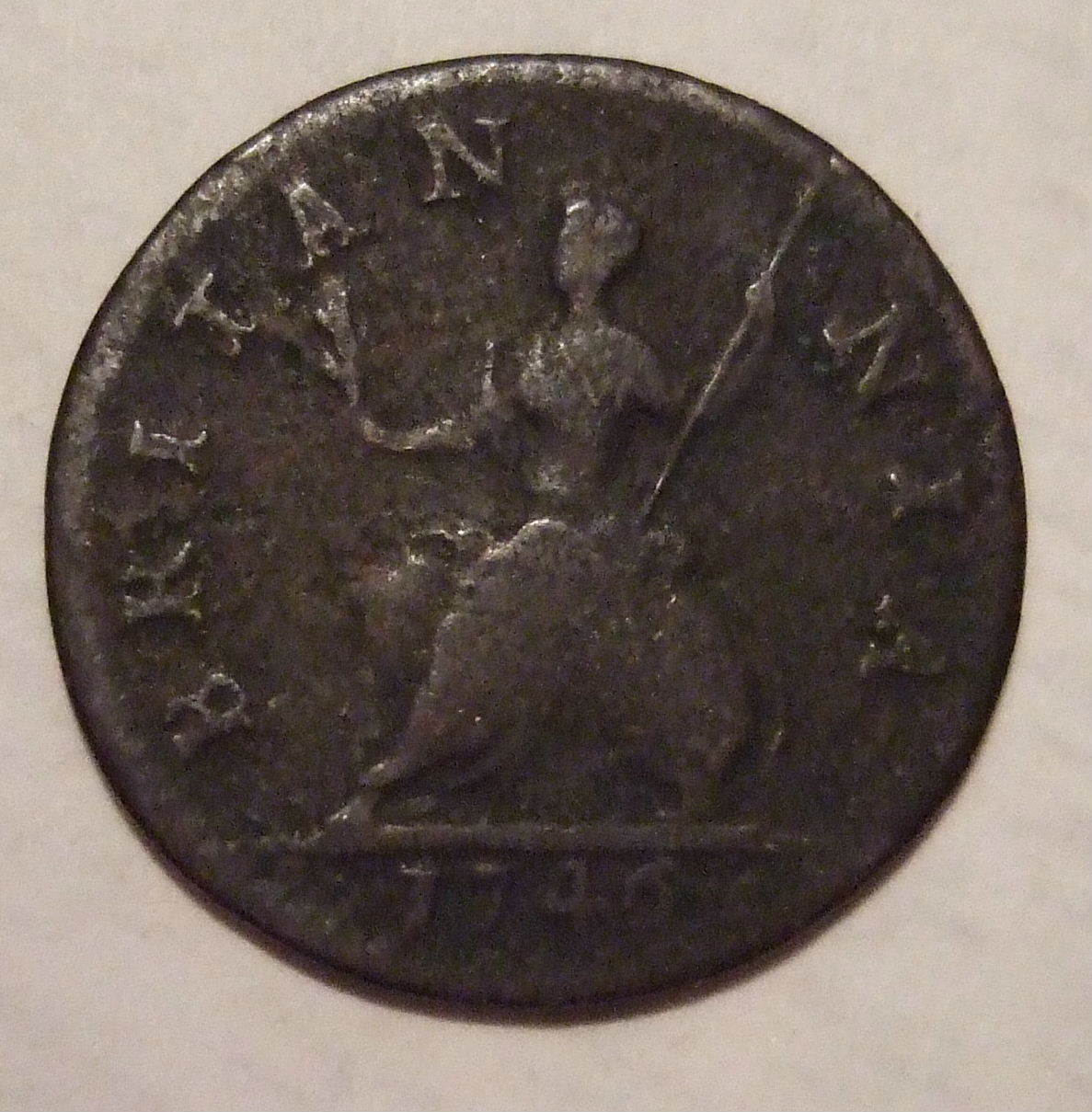
Britannia reverse, 1746

Values less than a pound were usually written in terms of shillings and pence, e.g. three shillings and six pence (3/6d.), pronounced "three and six" or "three and sixpence". Values of less than a shilling were simply written in pence, e.g. (8d.), pronounced "eightpence". A price with a farthing in it would be written like this: (21/4d.), pronounced "twopence [or tuppence/tuppenny] farthing", or (1/31/4d.), pronounced "one and threepence [or thruppence/thruppenny] farthing" or (19/113/4), pronounced "nineteen and elevenpence three farthing(s)". 19/113/4 was a value used to make goods seem "significantly" cheaper than £1, usage similar to the modern £0.99 (which is also the approximate purchasing power in 2021 of 113/4d in 1961, the year when the farthing was withdrawn from circulation). (Note: Face value fixed in 1970; real/retail value likely to be considerably higher)

The first bronze farthings were struck in 1860, in the reign of Queen Victoria, with a new reverse designed by Leonard Charles Wyon. This shows a seated Britannia, holding a trident, with the word FARTHING above. Between 1860 and 1895 there is a lighthouse to Britannia's left and a ship to her right. Various minor adjustments were made over the years to the level of the sea around Britannia and the angle of her trident. Some issues feature toothed edges to the coin, while others feature beading.

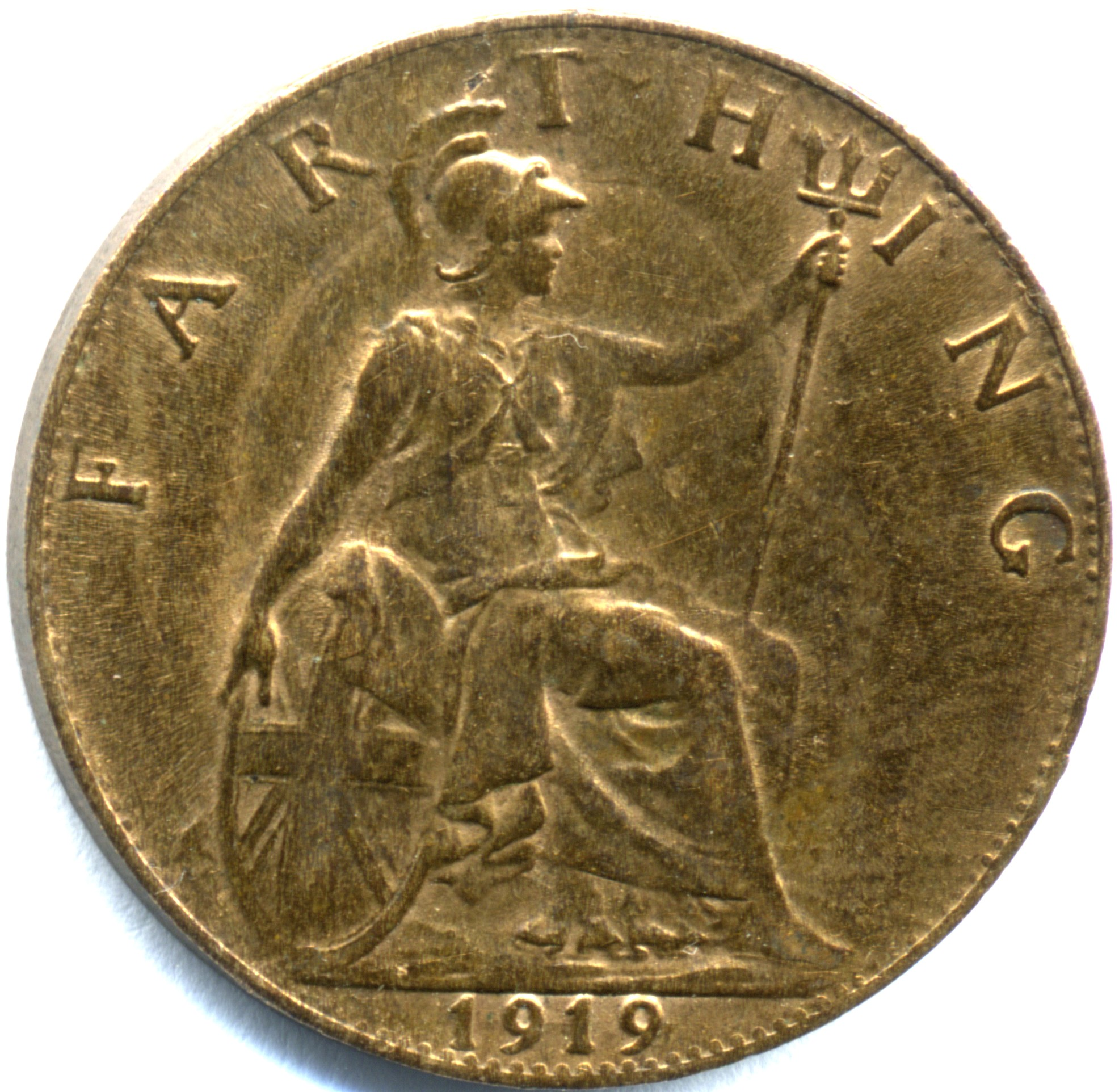
Britannia reverse, 1895–1936

After 1860, seven different obverses were used. Edward VII, George V, George VI and Elizabeth II each had a single obverse for the farthings produced during their respective reigns. Over the long reign of Queen Victoria, two different obverses were used. The farthing of 1860 carried the so-called "bun head", or "draped bust" of Queen Victoria on the obverse. The inscription around the bust read VICTORIA D G BRITT REG F D (abbreviated Latin: Victoria by the grace of God queen of Britain defender of the faith). This was replaced in 1895 by the "old head", or "veiled bust". The inscription on these coins read VICTORIA DEI GRA BRITT: REGINA: FID: DEF: IND: IMP (Victoria by the grace of God, queen of the Britons, defender of the faith, empress of India).

Farthings issued during the reign of Edward VII feature his likeness and bear the inscription EDWARDVS VII DEI GRA: BRITT: OMN: REX FID: DEF: IND: IMP (Edward VII by the grace of God, king of all British, defender of the faith, emperor of India). Similarly, those issued during the reign of George V feature his likeness and bear the inscription GEORGIVS V DEI GRA: BRITT: OMN: REX FID: DEF: IND: IMP (George V by the grace of God, king of all British, defender of the faith, emperor of India).

A farthing of King Edward VIII (reigned 1936) does exist, dated 1937, but technically it is a pattern coin, one produced for official approval, which it was due to receive at about the time that the King abdicated, and in the event no farthings bearing his likeness were ever issued. The pattern has a left-facing portrait of the king, who considered this to be his best side, and consequently broke the tradition of alternating the direction in which the monarch faces on coins — some viewed this as indicating bad luck for the reign; the inscription on the obverse is EDWARDVS VIII D G: BR: OMN: REX F: D: IND: IMP (Edward VIII by the grace of God, king of all British, defender of the faith, emperor of India).

One feature of the pattern farthing of Edward VIII was a redesigned reverse displaying the wren, one of Britain's smallest birds and cultural omen of good luck. From 1937 this appeared on the regular-issue farthings of George VI and was continued on the farthings of Elizabeth II until the last issue in 1956.

George VI coins feature the inscription GEORGIVS VI D G: BR: OMN: REX F: D: IND: IMP (George VI by the grace of God, king of all British, defender of the faith, emperor of India) before 1949, and GEORGIVS VI D G: BR: OMN: REX FIDEI: DEF: (George VI by the grace of God, king of all British, defender of the faith) thereafter. Unlike the penny, farthings were minted throughout the early reign of Elizabeth II, bearing the inscription ELIZABETH.II.DEI.GRA.BRITT.OMN.REGINA.F: D: (Elizabeth II by the grace of God, queen of all British, defender of the faith) in 1953, and ELIZABETH.II.DEI.GRATIA.REGINA.F: D: (Elizabeth II by the grace of God, queen, defender of the faith) thereafter.

=== Obverse designs ===
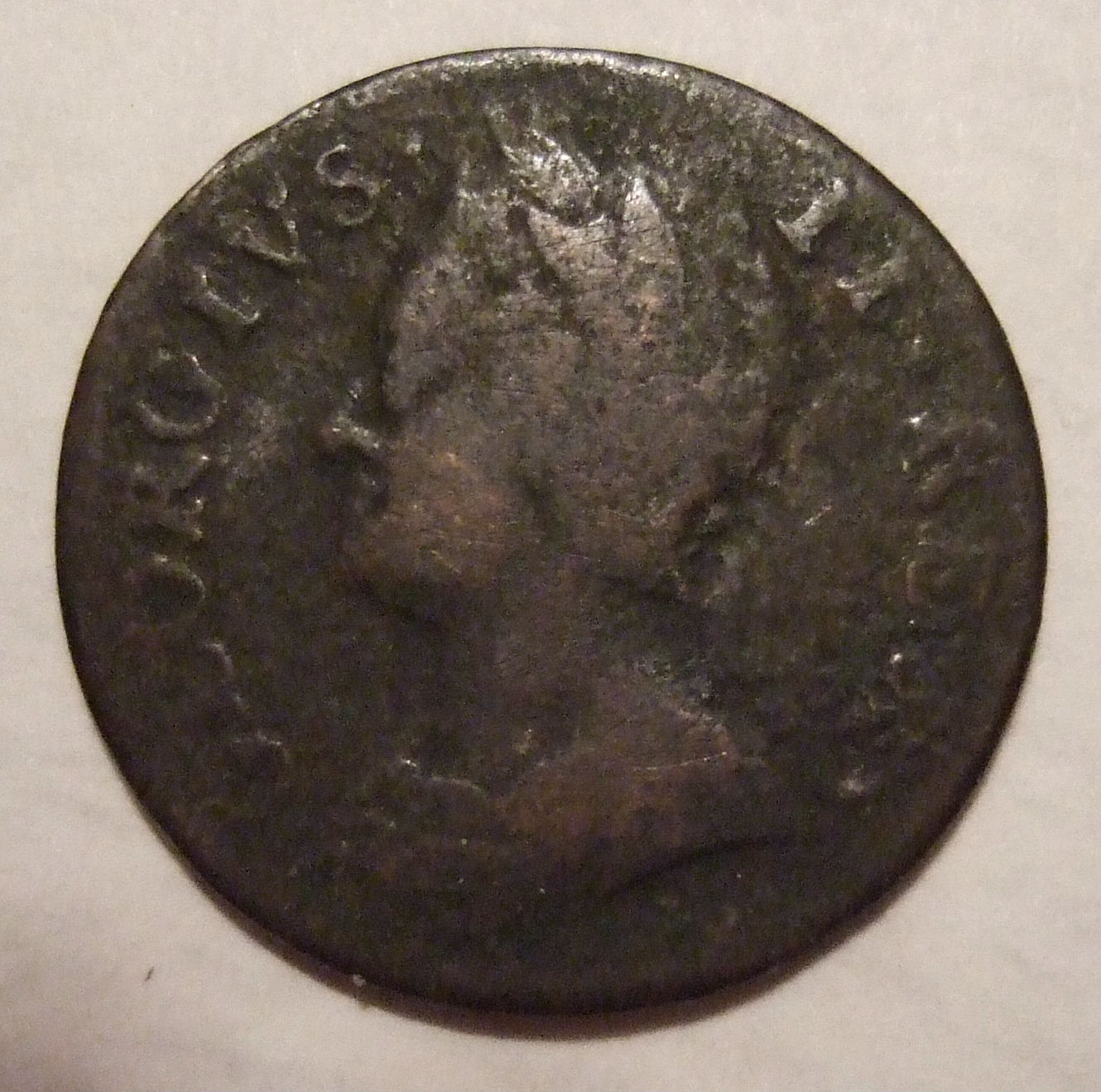
George II

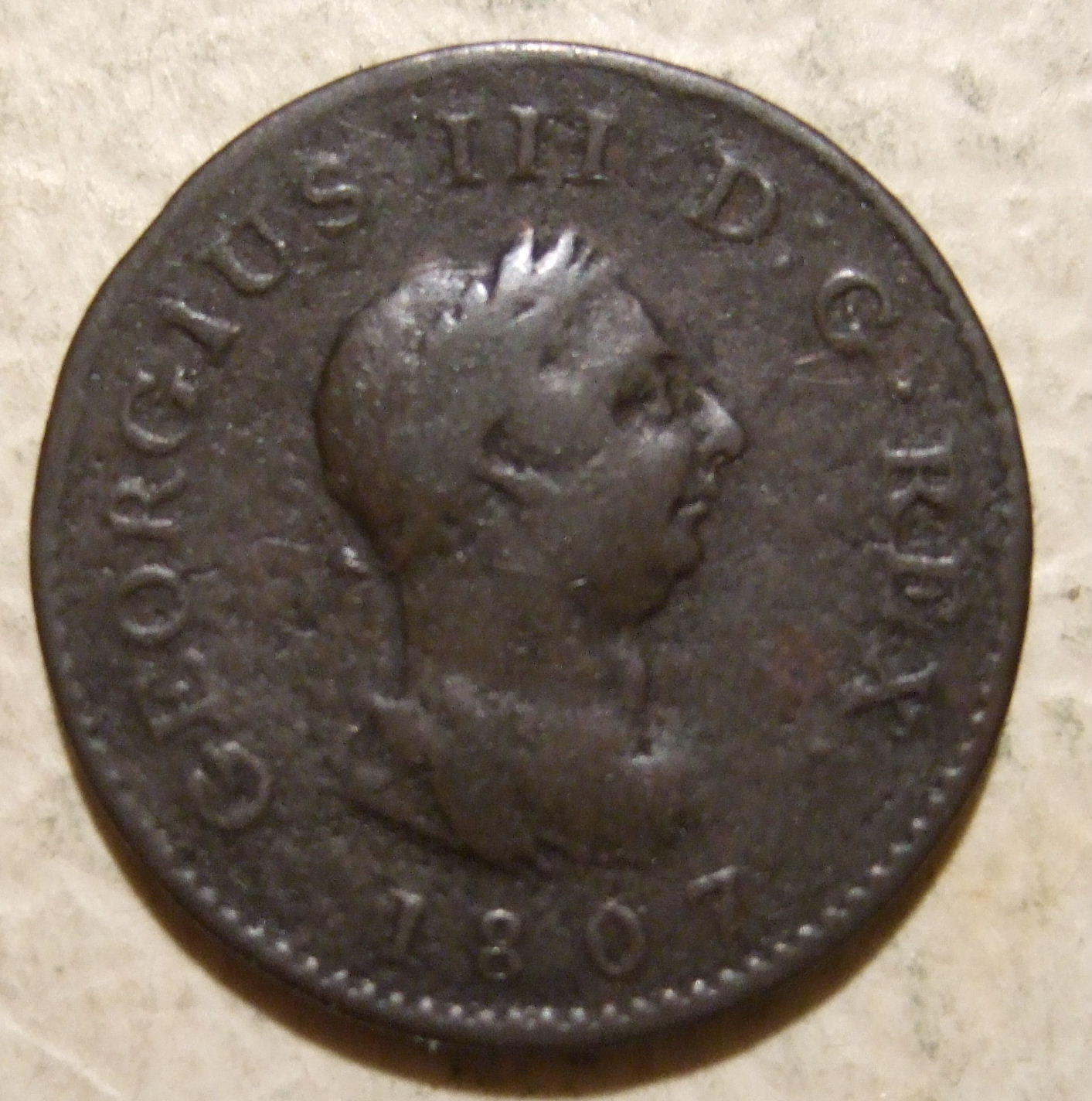
George III

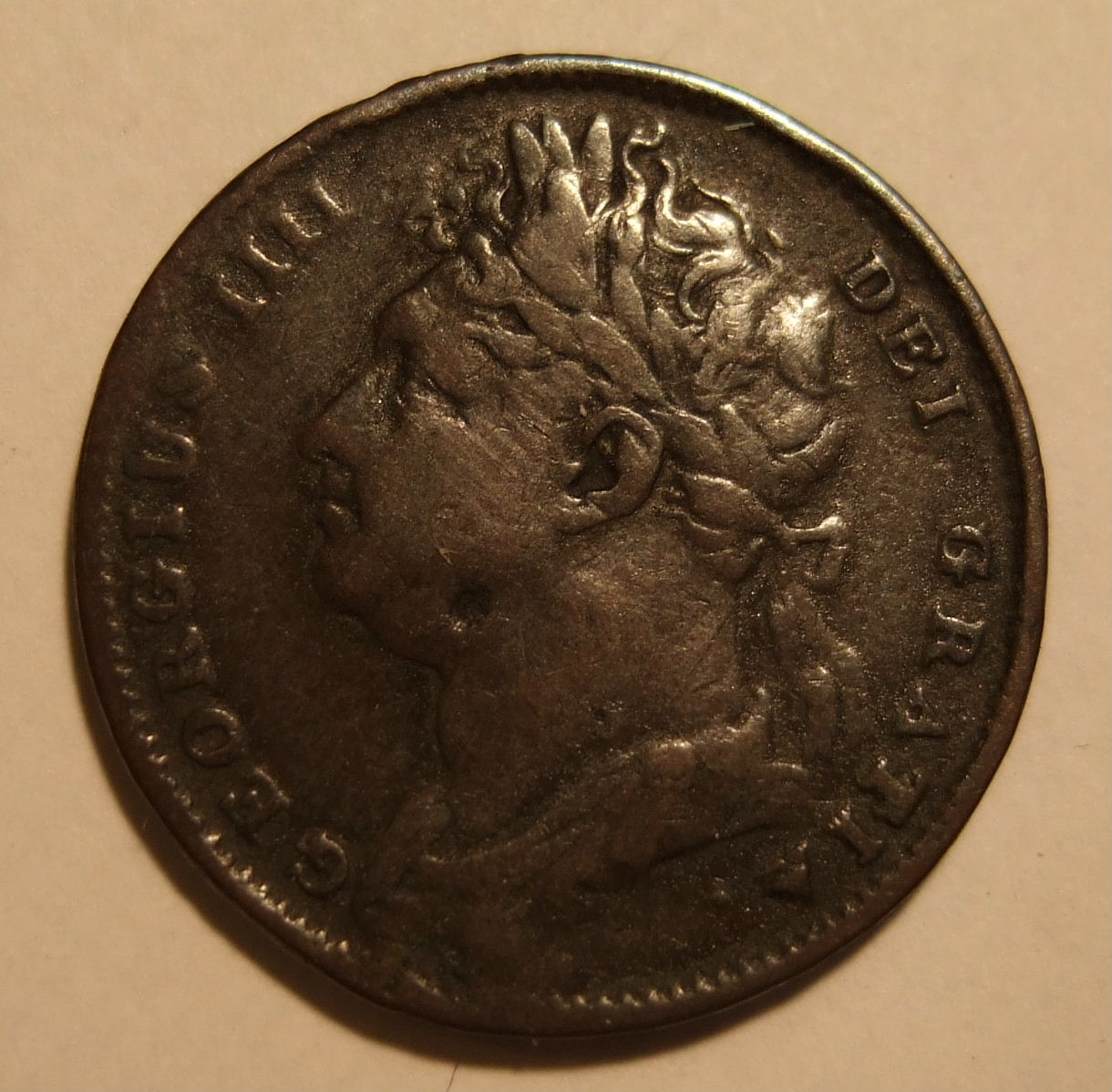
George IV

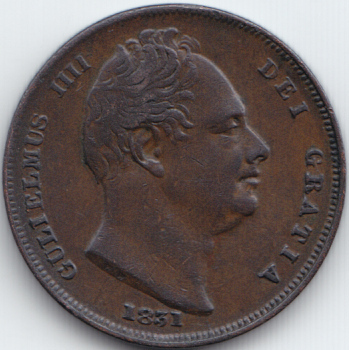
William IV

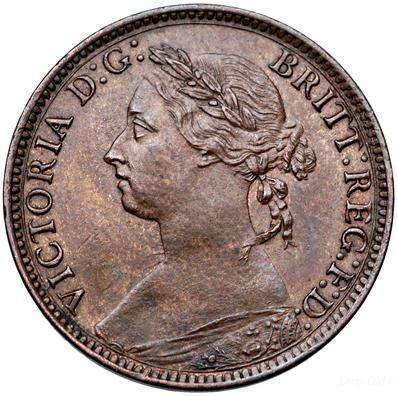
Victoria (young)

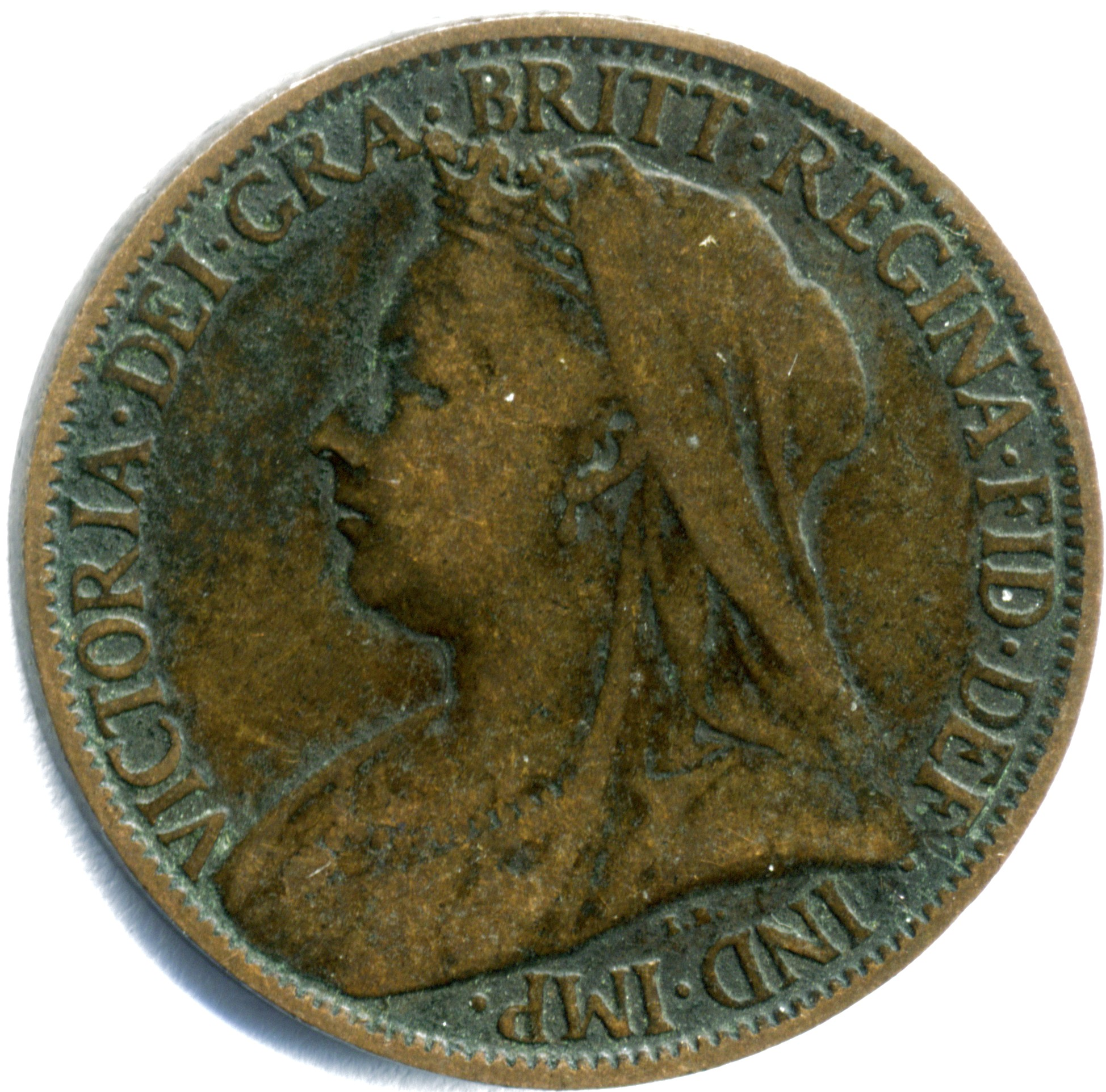
Victoria (old)

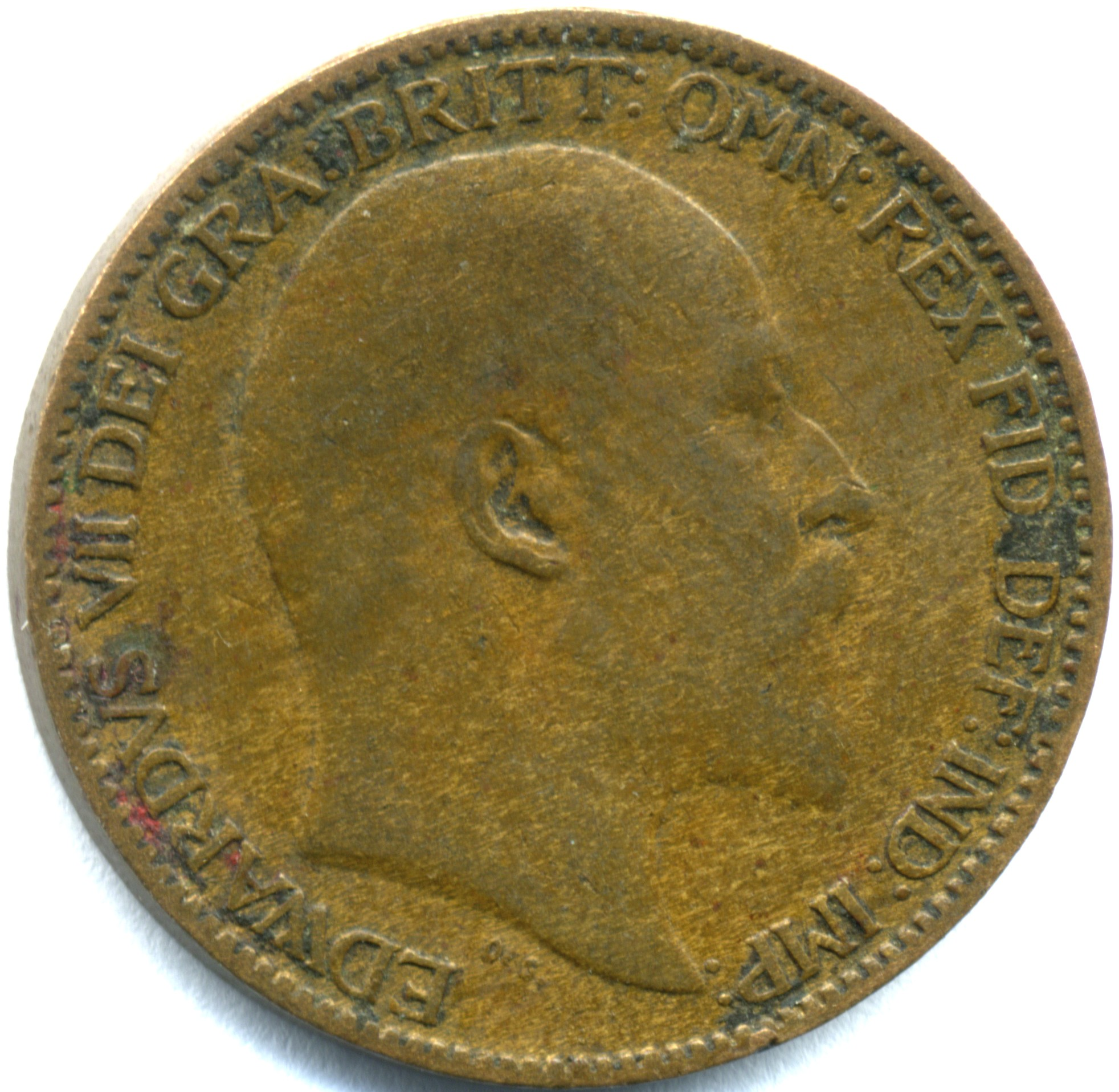
Edward VII

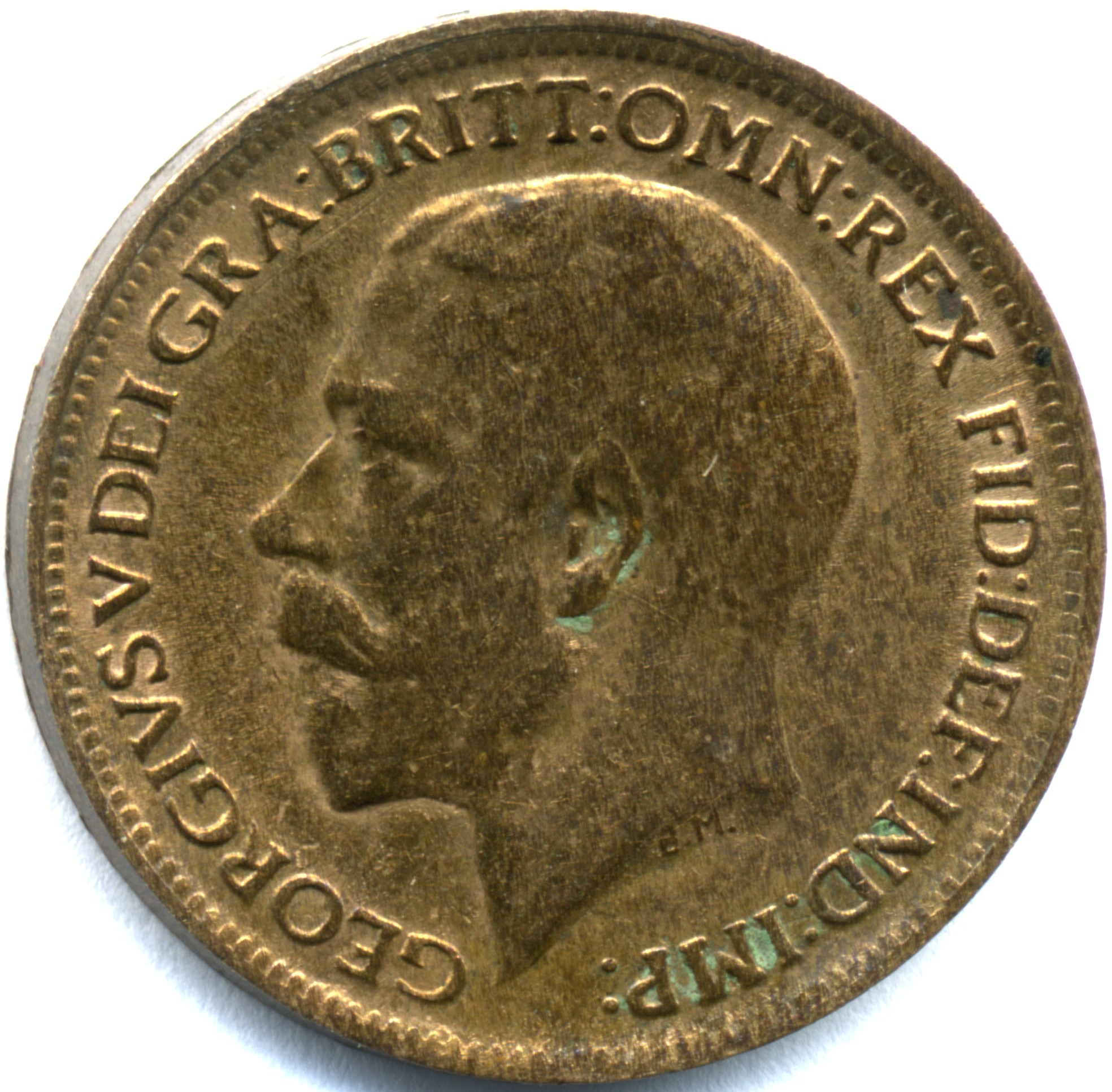
George V

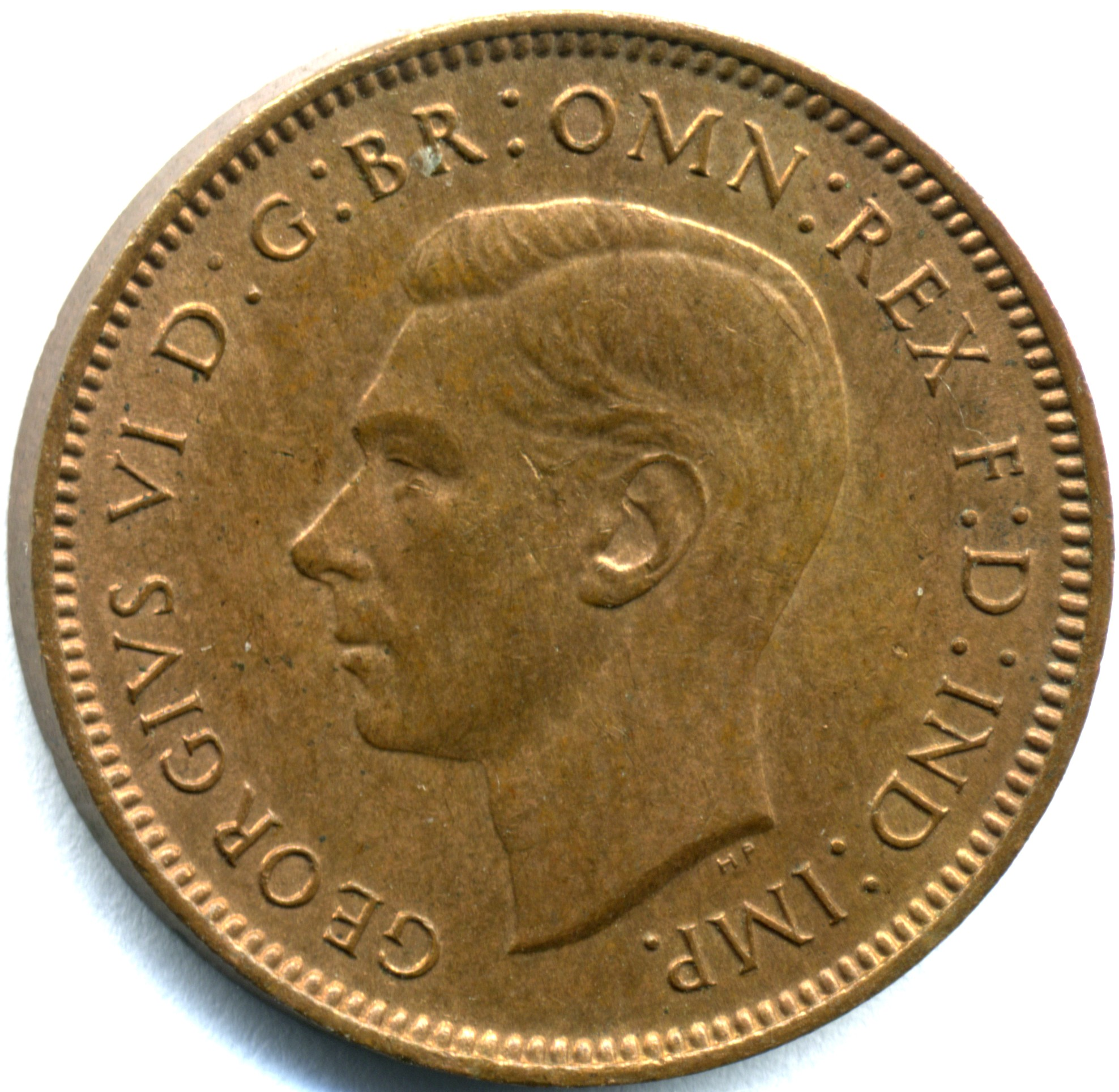
George VI

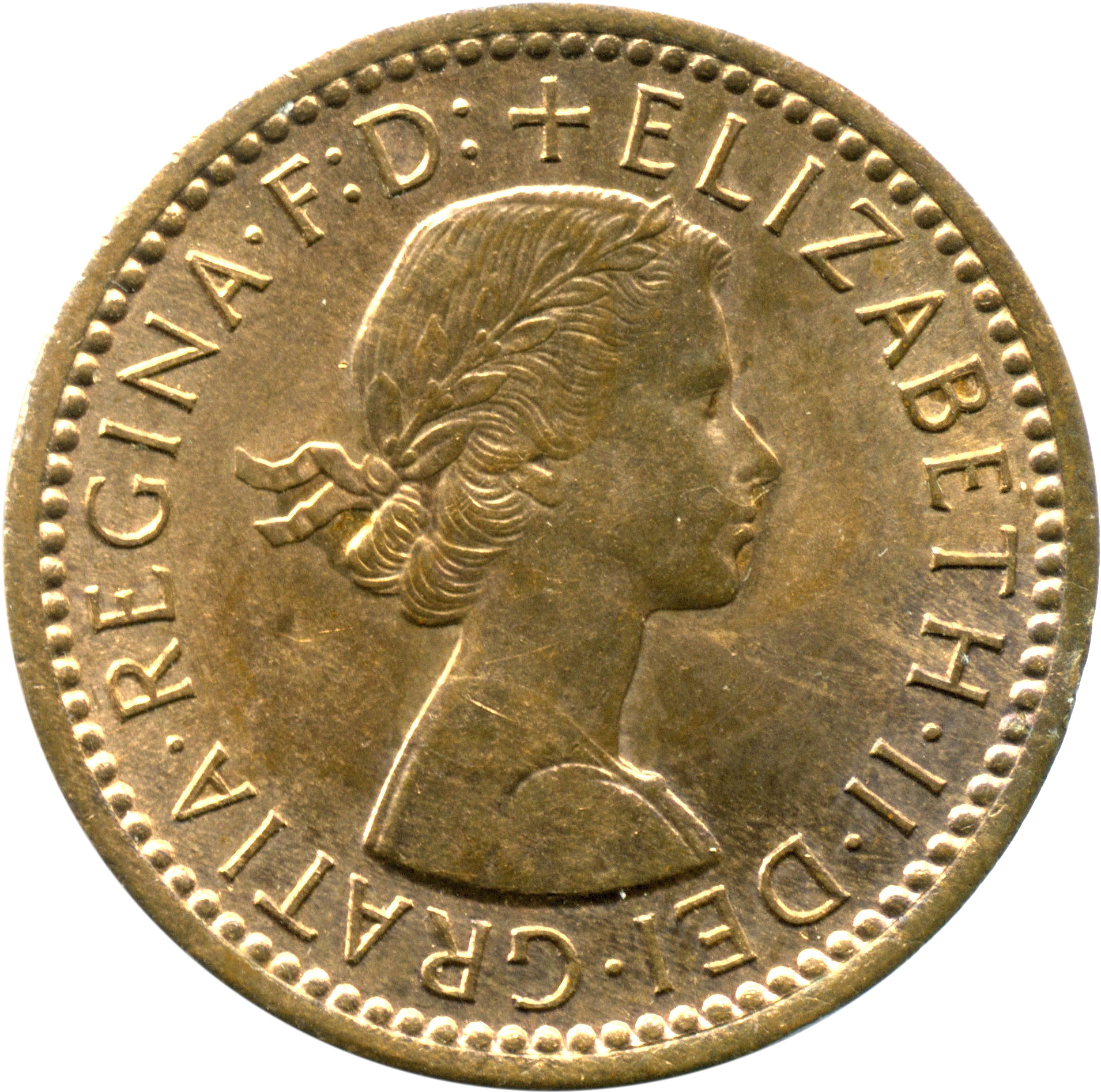
Elizabeth II

== Mintages ==
Victoria (Veiled bust)
- 1895 ~ 2,852,852 (inc bun head bust)
- 1896 ~ 3,668,610
- 1897 ~ 4,579,800
- 1898 ~ 4,010,080
- 1899 ~ 3,864,616
- 1900 ~ 5,969,317
- 1901 ~ 8,016,460

Edward VII
- 1902 ~ 5,125,120
- 1903 ~ 5,331,200
- 1904 ~ 3,628,800
- 1905 ~ 4,076,800
- 1906 ~ 5,340,160
- 1907 ~ 4,399,360
- 1908 ~ 4,264,960
- 1909 ~ 8,852,480
- 1910 ~ 2,298,400

George V
- 1911 ~ 5,196,800
- 1912 ~ 7,669,760
- 1913 ~ 4,184,320
- 1914 ~ 6,126,988
- 1915 ~ 7,129,255
- 1916 ~ 10,993,325
- 1917 ~ 21,434,844
- 1918 ~ 19,362,818
- 1919 ~ 15,089,425
- 1920 ~ 11,480,536
- 1921 ~ 9,469,097
- 1922 ~ 9,956,983
- 1923 ~ 8,034,457
- 1924 ~ 8,733,414
- 1925 ~ 12,634,697
- 1926 ~ 9,792,397
- 1927 ~ 7,868,355
- 1928 ~ 11,625,600
- 1929 ~ 8,419,200
- 1930 ~ 4,195,200
- 1931 ~ 6,595,200
- 1932 ~ 9,292,800
- 1933 ~ 4,560,000
- 1934 ~ 3,052,800
- 1935 ~ 2,227,200
- 1936 ~ 9,734,400

George VI
- 1937 ~ 8,131,200
- 1938 ~ 7,449,600
- 1939 ~ 31,440,000
- 1940 ~ 18,360,000
- 1941 ~ 27,312,000
- 1942 ~ 28,857,600
- 1943 ~ 33,345,600
- 1944 ~ 25,137,600
- 1945 ~ 23,736,000
- 1946 ~ 24,364,800
- 1947 ~ 14,745,600
- 1948 ~ 16,622,400
- 1949 ~ 8,424,000
- 1950 ~ 10,324,800
- 1950 Proof ~ 17,513
- 1951 ~ 14,016,000
- 1951 Proof ~ 20,000
- 1952 ~ 5,251,200

Elizabeth II
- 1953 ~ 6,131,037
- 1954 ~ 6,566,400
- 1955 ~ 5,779,200
- 1956 ~ 1,996,800

== See also ==
- Pound sterling
- Mill (currency)
- Half farthing
- Third farthing
- Quarter farthing
