= Tealby Hoard =

Medieval coin hoard found in Lincolnshire, England

The Tealby Hoard is a hoard of some 6,000 medieval coins found at Tealby, Lincolnshire in 1807.

== Discovery ==
The discovery of the coin hoard was first reported in the Stamford Mercury on 6 November 1807: "a person ploughing...turned up at one end of a considerable tumulus a coarse glazed earthen pot, which contained about five thousand silver pennies, of Henry I and Henry II". It was followed up with a short article on 20 November which identified that some of the hoard had been deposited at the British Museum and others were in private collections, especially that of Joseph Banks.

== Contents ==
The hoard contained over 6000 silver coins in a Roman waster (a mis-fired) ceramic vessel. The vessel (donated to the City and County Museum, Lincoln, in 1956) was over 900 years old when the hoard was deposited. Of the coins 604 were retained for collectors but 5,127 coins were subsequently melted down at the Royal Mint in the Tower of London.

The discover of the coins led to the modern description of a type of penny issued by Henry II as the 'Tealby-type'. Tealby pennies show the development of Medieval coinage in England.
