= History of the halfpenny =

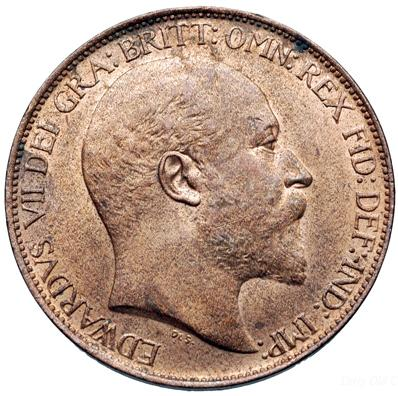
The obverse of a halfpenny, showing Edward VII

The British halfpenny was worth 1/480th of a pound sterling. At first in its 700-year history it was made from silver, but as the value of silver increased the coin was made from base metals. It was finally abandoned in 1969 as part of the process of decimalising the British currency. "Halfpenny", colloquially written ha'penny, was pronounced /ˈheɪpəni/ HAY-pə-nee; "1 ½d" was spoken as a penny ha'penny /əˈpɛniˈheɪpni/ or three ha'pence /θriːˈheɪpəns/.

It was long considered that the first halfpenny coins were produced in the reign of King Edward I (1272–1307), with earlier requirements for small change being provided by "cut coinage"; that is, pennies cut into halves or quarters, usually along the cross which formed a prominent part of the reverse of the coin. However, in recent years metal detectorists have discovered a few halfpennies of Kings Henry I (1100–1135) and Henry III (1216–1272) – these are extremely rare and very little is known about them; they have all been found in the London area, where they circulated alongside the more common cut coinage, and while it is possible that these coins were patterns or trials, it is clear that they did see circulation. It is possible that there are other coins or issues still to be discovered.

== Early halfpennies ==
A few King Henry I silver halfpennies have been discovered recently. The issue is possibly a pattern or trial, but it is obvious that several specimens entered circulation. The obverse features an uncrowned front-facing bust of the king, with the inscription HENRIC REX – King Henry – while the reverse features a cross with the identification of the moneyer GODWIN A ON WI – Godwin of Winchester. The fact that round halfpennies were issued by Henry I was mentioned by both John of Worcester and Geoffrey of Monmouth.

Two issues, both struck at the London mint, have been discovered. Both are in the short-cross style of King Henry III, produced between 1216 and 1247, and are similar in design to the pennies, but only half the size. The obverse shows a crowned bust of the king holding a sceptre, with the inscription HENRICUS REX, while the reverse shows a small cross with four pellets in each quarter with the moneyer's inscription TERRI (or ELIS) ON LUND – Terry (or Elis) of London.

== Edwardian and Henrician halfpennies ==
King Edward I (1272–1307) successfully introduced the halfpenny as part of his new coinage, which allowed trade to increase. As with all coins of this period, the denomination was not written on the coin, which was worth its weight in silver; thus a halfpenny was half the size and weight of a penny. All hammered halfpennies tend to be difficult to identify because they are small, often clipped, and in poor condition, and the legends on the coins are often incorrect because of the difficulty in making dies which were small enough for the denomination. The fact that Kings Edward II, III, and IV also issued halfpennies makes it difficult to distinguish between them – in general, Edward I's coins are slightly larger than his successors'. As with other denominations, by far the majority of coins were produced at the London mint, in the Tower of London, but five other mints were active in Edward I's reign. The legend on the reverse of the coin identifies the mint's name, and reads CIVITAS LONDON or LONDONIENSIS for London, VILLA BRISTOLLIE for Bristol, CIVITAS LINCOL for Lincoln, NOVI CASTRI for Newcastle upon Tyne, CIVITAS EBORACI for York, and VILLA BEREVVICI for Berwick-upon-Tweed.

The king's name appears in the obverse inscription, usually EDW, EDWA, or EDWR R ANGL DNS HYB, or RICARD or HENRI respectively for the issues of Kings Richard II (1377–1399) and Henry IV (1399–1413).

During the reign of King Edward II (1307–1327), halfpennies were only produced at the mints in London and Berwick, probably because sufficient had been produced when his father introduced the new coinage. The principal difference between the coins of Edward II and his father is that the obverse inscription of the London-produced coins reads EDWARDUS REX A(NG), and EDWARDUS REX AN on the Berwick-produced coins.

Three mints were actively producing halfpennies in the reign of King Edward III, 1327–1377, at London, Berwick, and Reading (VILLA RADINGY), although Berwick and Reading coins are very rare. The usual obverse inscription of this reign was EDWARDUS REX AN – Edward King of the English – or occasionally on earlier coins EDWARDUS REX – King Edward – or EDWARDUS ANGLIE D or EDWARDUS DEI GRA R – Edward by the grace of God King. At this time English coins were much envied in Europe for their weight and good metal content, with the result that English halfpennies were copied on the continent; they are similar in style to those of Edward III, but the obverse legend often reads EDWARDIENSIS.

King Richard II (1377–1399) produced all his halfpennies at the London mint. The obverse legend reads RICHARD (or RICARD) REX ANGL – Richard King of England – around a front-facing bust of the king.

The halfpennies of King Henry IV (1399–1413) are difficult to identify, mainly because they have been heavily clipped or worn. The obverse legend reads HENRIC REX ANGL around a front-facing bust of the king, while the reverse legend reads CIVITAS LONDON. In 1412 the weight of the halfpenny was reduced from 4.5 grains (0.29 grams) to 3.75 grains (0.24 grams), although coins were produced from the same dies as before.

The halfpennies of King Henry V (1413–1422) are a little easier to identify, but the basic design remained the same as before.

In the first reign of King Henry VI (1422–1461), halfpennies were commonly produced at London and Calais (VILLA CALIS), and less commonly at York. The designs are continuations of those of the earlier Henries, with the obverse legend HENRIC REX ANGL.

The halfpennies of the first reign of King Edward IV (1461–1470) are divided into the heavy coinage up to 1464, which was only minted in London, and the light coinage from 1464, produced at London, Bristol (now VILLA BRISTOW), Canterbury (CIVITAS CANTOR), York, and Norwich (CIVITAS NORWIC). The obverse inscription reads EDWARD DI GRA REX.

During the short second reign of Henry VI (1470–1471), halfpennies were produced at London and Bristol. The obverse inscription was changed to read HENRIC DI GRA REX.

Halfpennies of the second reign of Edward IV (1471–1483) are much like those of the first reign (only a few months earlier) but they were also produced at Durham (CIVITAS DERAM).

King Richard III's (1483–1485) short reign only produced halfpennies from the London mint. The obverse inscription reads RICARD DI GRA REX, which distinguishes the coins from those of Richard II.

== Tudor halfpennies ==
Halfpennies in the reign of King Henry VII (1485–1509) were produced mostly at London, but also at Canterbury and York. Henry's coins are fairly distinct from those of the earlier Henries, with the king's front-facing portrait being different in style, and the obverse legend reading HENRIC DEI GRA REX.

By the reign of King Henry VIII, the halfpenny was becoming a coin of lesser importance, and less effort was spent on producing good-quality impressions on the coin blanks, with the result that many of the inscriptions are difficult to read. The coins of his first and second coinage (1509–1526 and 1526–1544) look similar to those of his father, Henry VII, although the obverse inscriptions were changed between the two coinages, from HENRIC DI GRA REX ANGL to H DG ROSA SIE SPIA – Henry by the grace of God a rose without a thorn (Henricus Dei gratia rosa sine spina).

The third (1544–1547) and posthumous (1547–1551) coinage halfpennies have a more lifelike bust, but were produced in debased silver (only 1/3 silver and 2/3 copper) and therefore are usually in a very poor condition.

In the short reign (1547–1553) of King Edward VI there were several issues of halfpennies. The first issue was produced between April 1547 and January 1549 at the Tower and Bristol mints; both mints' products are extremely rare and have the crowned bust of the king on the obverse, with the inscription EDG ROSA SIN SPIN (or EDG DG ROSA SIN SPIN on some Bristol coins) and a cross with CIVITAS LONDON or CIVITAS BRISTOLI on the reverse. The final issue of halfpennies was produced at the Tower mint between 1550 and 1553 with the obverse legend being EDG ROSA SINE SPINA surrounding a rose in the centre of the coin, and the reverse showing CIVITAS LONDON around the royal shield over a cross. The quality of silver in this final issue of halfpennies was so poor that the coin was often used as a farthing.

No halfpennies were produced in the reigns of Queen Mary I, or of Philip and Mary, or for the first twenty years of the reign of Queen Elizabeth I.

Halfpennies were produced in some quantity in Queen Elizabeth I's fifth and sixth coinage issues (1582–1600 and 1601–1602). Because of their small size, they did not have the queen's effigy or any legends on them, but instead had a portcullis on the obverse and a cross on the reverse. Sixth-issue coins also had a mintmark on the obverse: "1" for 1601 and "2" for 1602.

== 17th-century silver halfpennies ==
When King James I ascended the English throne in 1603, for the first couple of years halfpennies were produced in the same style as Elizabeth I's sixth issue, though with a thistle or lis mintmark. From 1604 onwards, there was a completely different style of coin with a rose on the obverse and a thistle on the reverse.

Surprisingly, considering the huge variety of coins of other denominations produced during his reign between 1625 and 1649, hardly any halfpennies were minted during the reign of King Charles I. The most common issue was produced at the Tower mint and simply had a rose on both sides of the coin. The other issue was produced at the Aberystwyth mint, and had a rose on one side and plumes on the reverse.

The final silver halfpennies were produced under the auspices of the Commonwealth. Commonwealth halfpennies were extremely plain, having no inscription on either side, but a shield charged with a Saint George's Cross on the obverse, and the Irish harp on the reverse.

== Base-metal halfpennies ==
In the early years of the reign of King Charles II (1660–1685), there was a clear need for low-denomination coins to fund day-to-day purchases. The silver 1d and 2d coins issued in the first few years of the reign were being hoarded, and tradesmen in many parts of the country had taken to issuing private tokens in base metal; while this was an offence, in practice penalties were minimal and the government appreciated the need for such coinage which was not available legally. A problem with the production of low-value coins is that if the face value is less than the cost of production (including the metal) then the exercise is done at a loss and the coins may be clipped or melted down for their metal content; if the face value is higher, counterfeit coins begin to appear. The Mint was not ready to produce copper coins until 1672; by that time Maundy-type small silver (1d–4d) coins were being produced and were circulating widely, so no copper pennies were produced, although a Royal Proclamation in August 1672 decreed that halfpennies and farthings would be issued, and that they would have a face value equal to the value of the metal less the cost of producing them. The new coins were legal tender up to a total value of six pence, and depicted Britannia (modelled by the Duchess of Richmond) on the reverse. It was soon discovered that the Mint was incapable of producing the copper blanks needed for the new coins, and these eventually were imported from Sweden; to facilitate the process, the Customs Duty on the import of the metal was waived. Further delays ensued, caused not least by transportation problems, and the first halfpennies did not appear in circulation until after Christmas (the year did not end until 24 March in those days, so there were still three months before the start of 1673).

The ideal of striking coins with a value equal to their production costs was not long maintained, and the coins were given a face value slightly higher than their metal content, so inevitably counterfeits soon began to appear.

Charles II's head faces left on the copper coinage, and right on the silver coinage.

The copper halfpenny weighed between 10.0 and 12.0 grams and had a diameter of 28–31 millimetres. The inscription on the obverse, around the king's head, reads CAROLVS A CAROLO – Charles, son of Charles – while the reverse shows BRITAN NIA around the left facing seated Britannia, holding a spray and trident, with the date beneath Britannia. Coins were produced dated 1672, 1673, and 1675.

The halfpennies of King James II (1685–1688) were made of tin with a small square plug of copper in the centre. The corrosion properties of tin mean that very few coins survive in a good state of preservation, not helped by the electrochemical reaction between copper and tin. The objects of using tin were to produce coins at a profit while at the same time producing a coin which would be difficult to counterfeit, and at the same time to assist the ailing tin-mining industry. The coins weighed between 10.5 and 11.6 grams, with a diameter of 28–30 millimetres. The obverse showed the right-facing effigy of the king with the inscription IACOBVS SECVNDVS – James the Second – while the reverse shows the same Britannia as before. Unusually, the date appears not on the reverse but on the edge of the coin, which has the inscription NVMMORVM FAMVLVS date – an ancillary coinage. The coins were produced in 1685, 1686, and 1687.

In the joint reign of King William III and Queen Mary II (1689–1694), the production of bimetallic tin/copper halfpennies continued in 1689, 1690, 1691 and 1692. However the tin coinage was becoming increasingly unpopular because the public did not feel that there was any intrinsic value in the coins and also the corrosion problem had become apparent; even worse, lead counterfeits had started to appear. Just before the queen's death from smallpox in 1694 a copper halfpenny, weighing 9.1–11.7 grams with 28–31 millimetres diameter was reintroduced. The contract for the new coins stipulated that the copper used should be English and the blanks struck at the Mint. It is noticeable that Charles II's Swedish copper halfpennies have toned to a dark red colour, while the William and Mary halfpennies tone to black, presumably because of different impurities in the copper.

The obverse inscription read GVLIELMVS ET MARIA, while the reverse reads BRITANNIA (with the date beneath Britannia in 1694). The 1689–1692 coins have the edge inscription NVMMORVM FAMVLVS with the date.

For the widowed King William III, the production of halfpennies continued under the contract granted during the previous reign. However, it soon became apparent that the manufacturers were in breach of contract – to save costs, not only were some of the blanks being cast rather than struck, but some of the coins were themselves being cast in one operation. There were other ways in which the manufacturers were economising on expenses – cheap labour was being used, including foreigners, some of whom could not properly spell or punctuate the words they were engraving on the dies. Towards the end of the reign both the workmanship and the design and production of the dies for the copper coinage had sunk to a nadir, which is curious as simultaneously the mint was producing the highest quality work in the five and two guinea pieces which were being produced. By 1698 there was a glut of copper coinage and an Act was passed to stop the coining for one year; this seems to have had little effect and the proliferation continued. There were further Parliamentary attempts to control the glut of coinage later.

The William III halfpenny appears with various distinct types of engraving of the king's head, Britannia, and the inscriptions, with the quality getting worse as the reign wore on. The coins were copper, weighing 8.9 to 11.5 grams, with a diameter of 28–29 millimetres. The king's effigy on the obverse faced right, with the inscription GVLIELMVS TERTIVS – William the Third. Britannia appears on the reverse with the inscription BRITANNIA and the date normally in the exergue beneath Britannia. Coins were produced each year between 1695 and 1701.

Due to the glut of copper coinage, there was no need to produce any copper halfpennies during the reign of Queen Anne (1701–1714).

== The United Kingdom ==
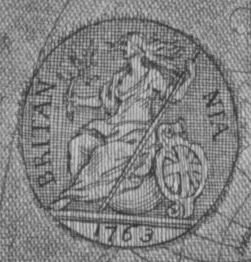
Hogarth engraved this Britannia emblem with a possibly similar appearance to that of the later coins when he retouched one of his plates.

Soon after the accession of King George I (1714–1727) the surplus of copper coins was used up, and in 1717 a new contract was signed and a Royal Warrant issued for the production of a new halfpenny. The halfpennies struck in 1717 and 1718 looked slightly odd as they were smaller, thicker and somewhat lighter than the previous issues, weighing 9.4–10.3 grams with a diameter of 25–27 millimetres, but they were well-struck with high-relief features of the right-facing head of King George and the inscription GEORGIVS REX on the obverse, and Britannia with the inscription BRITANNIA and the date in the exergue beneath Britannia. The 1717–1718 issue is known as the dump halfpenny. For the 1719–1724 issue, the size of the coin was increased to 26–29 millimetres, though with the same weight of metal as before.

King George II's (1727–1760) halfpennies were the most prolific issue yet, but to them must be added a huge range of counterfeits (and pieces similar to counterfeits but with markedly different legends from the real coins, so that the manufacturers could avoid accusations of counterfeiting). Many genuine coins were melted down and underweight fabrications produced from the molten metal. It is difficult for people who use a modern regulated currency to appreciate the extent to which counterfeiting had debased the currency – for long periods of time, counterfeits outnumbered genuine coins. Halfpennies were produced in all years between 1729 and 1754, with the exception of 1741. They weighed 9.7–10.3 grams and had a diameter of 28–30 millimetres. The obverse showed the left-facing head of King George and the inscription GEORGIVS II REX on the obverse, and Britannia with the inscription BRITANNIA and the date in the exergue beneath Britannia.

=== Counterfeit coinage ===
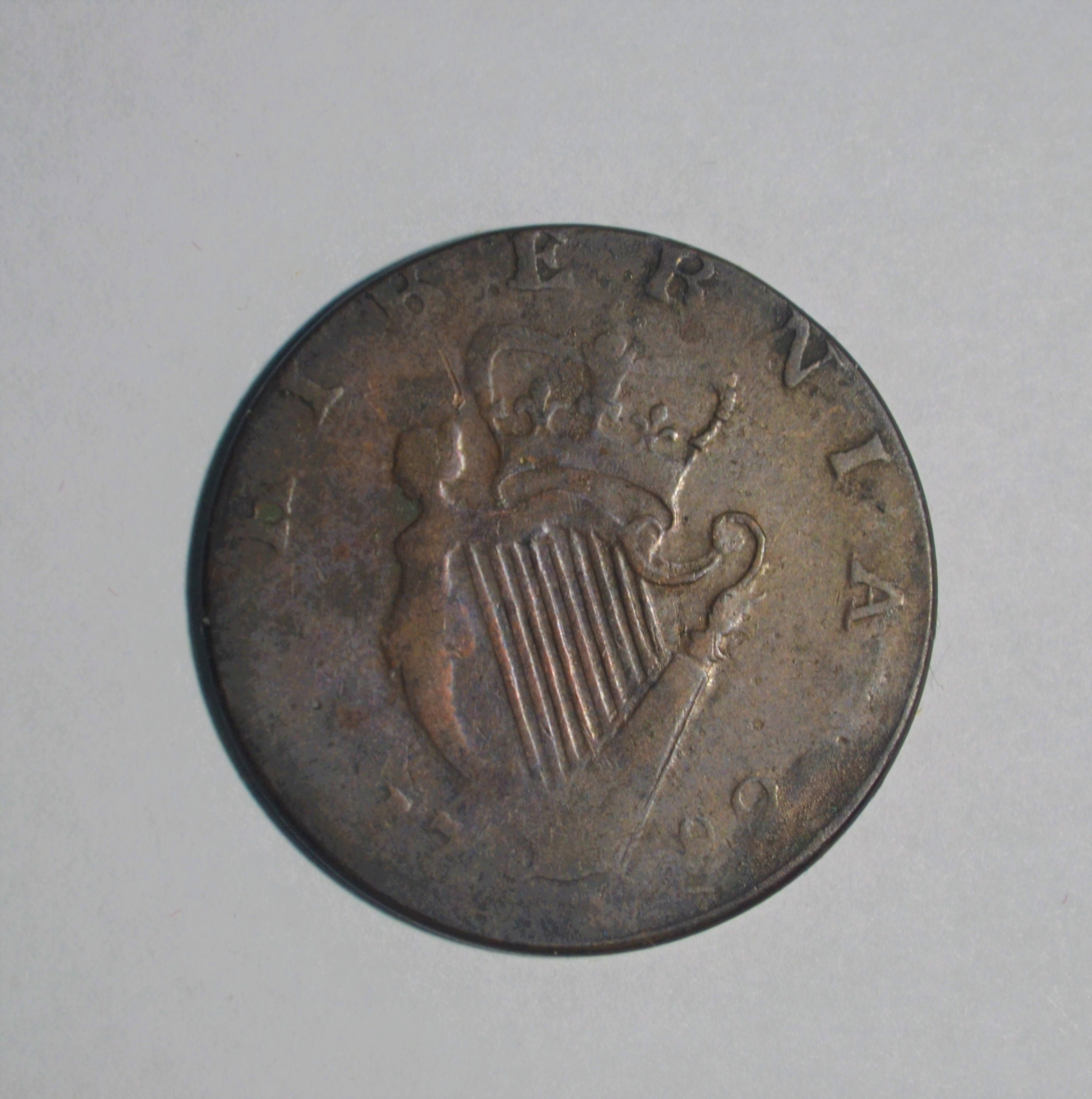
Irish counterfeit ha'penny

In the reign of King George III (1760–1820) the first issue of halfpennies did not come until 10 years after the king's accession, in 1770. Counterfeiting was rampant, and in 1771 the issuance of counterfeit copper coin became a serious crime; this however had little effect and for the next twenty years or so the majority of copper so-called coins in circulation were forgeries. In March 1782 a female counterfeiter was hanged, then fixed to a stake and burned before the debtor's door at Newgate prison in London. In a letter to Lord Hawkesbury of 14 April 1789, Matthew Boulton commented "In the course of my journeys, I observe that I receive upon an average two-thirds counterfeit halfpence for change at toll-gates, etc., and I believe the evil is daily increasing, as the spurious money is carried into circulation by the lowest class of manufacturers, who pay with it the principal part of the wages of the poor people they employ". Boulton's contract in 1797 to produce the Cartwheel pennies and twopences, thwarting the counterfeiters, did not extend to producing the halfpenny, though Boulton had expected that it would, and had prepared patterns of the appropriate size and weight in accordance with his ideas on the intrinsic value of copper coins. The reason the government gave for the omission of the denomination from the contract was that the large number of de facto halfpennies (including tokens and fakes) would be driven out of circulation and Boulton would be unable to produce enough coins to meet the demand that would ensue. Public demand for legal halfpennies soon forced the government to change its mind, and in 1798 a contract was issued to Boulton for him to produce halfpennies and farthings dated 1799. However, in the meantime the price of copper had risen, and consequently the weight of the coins was reduced slightly, which resulted in them not being as popular as expected. In 1806 a further 427.5 tons of copper was struck into halfpennies by Boulton, but the price of copper had risen again and the weight was even less than the 1799 issue. This time, however, there was no unfavourable reaction from the public, so perhaps the national obsession with "intrinsic value" was over.

=== Great Britain and beyond, 1800–1970 ===
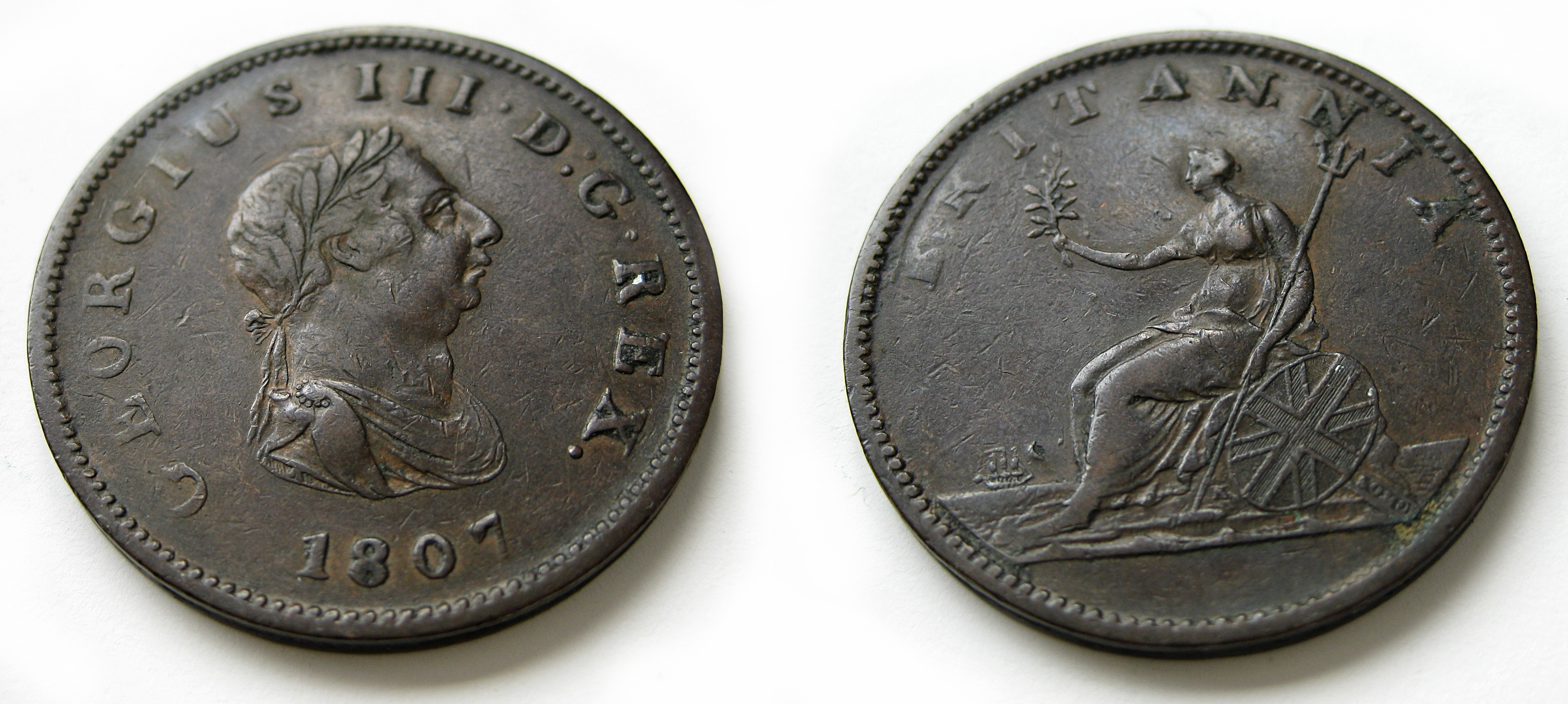
1807 halfpenny struck at the Soho Mint

George III halfpennies were produced in three distinct phases:

- 1770–1775 (all years). Weight 9.2–10.8 grams, diameter 29–30 millimetres. Obverse shows a right-facing bust of the king, with the inscription GEORGIVS III REX, reverse shows a left-facing seated Britannia holding a spray and spear, with the inscription BRITANNIA and the date in the exergue beneath Britannia. (The king's bust has a fuller face in 1774 and 1775).
- 1799. Weight 12.0–13.1 grams, diameter 30–31 millimetres. Obverse shows a right-facing bust of the king, with the inscription GEORGIVS III DEI GRATIA REX, reverse shows a redesigned left-facing seated Britannia holding a spray and spear, with the inscription BRITANNIA 1799.
- 1806–1807. Weight 9.2–9.8 grams, diameter 29 millimetres. Obverse shows a right-facing bust of the king, with the inscription GEORGIVS III D G REX date, reverse shows a slightly different left-facing seated Britannia holding a spray and spear, with the inscription BRITANNIA.

After the mint moved from the Tower of London to Tower Hill the production of gold and silver coins took precedence over copper. The production of copper coins did not resume until the reign of King George IV (1820–1830), when farthings were produced in 1821. The issue of new halfpennies did not happen until 14 November 1825 as a result of a disagreement between the egocentric designer Benedetto Pistrucci and the authorities, which resulted in William Wyon being invited to design the coins instead. This delay may be regarded as a good thing, as Wyon's designs are generally considered among the most elegant British coins. The George IV halfpenny was produced between 1825 and 1827, weighed 9.1–9.5 grams, with a diameter of 28 millimetres. The obverse shows a left-facing laureated bust of King George IV with the inscription GEORGIUS IV DEI GRATIA date, while the reverse shows a right-facing seated helmeted Britannia with a shield and trident, with the inscription BRITANNIAR REX FID DEF. Wyon's preference was to put the date under the king's bust, and to put the rose, thistle, and shamrock in the exergue underneath Britannia where the date commonly appeared before.

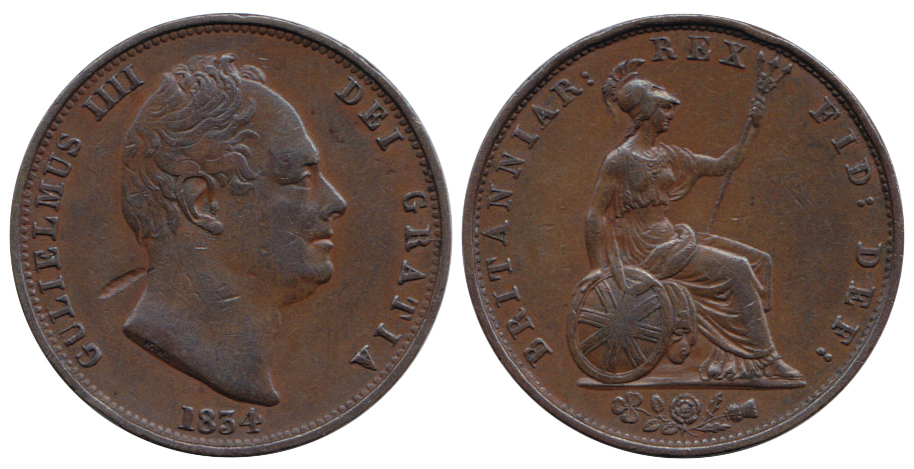
William IV halfpenny 1834. Copper.

The halfpenny of King William IV (1830–1837), produced in 1831, 1834, and 1837, continues the George IV design but with a right-facing bust of the new king, with the inscription GULIELMUS IIII DEI GRATIA date, while the reverse is identical to the previous reigns'.

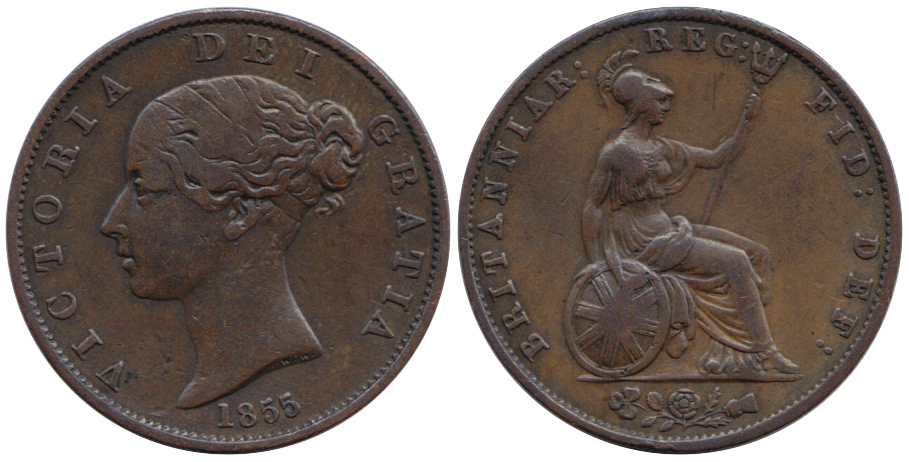
Victoria halfpenny 1855. Copper.

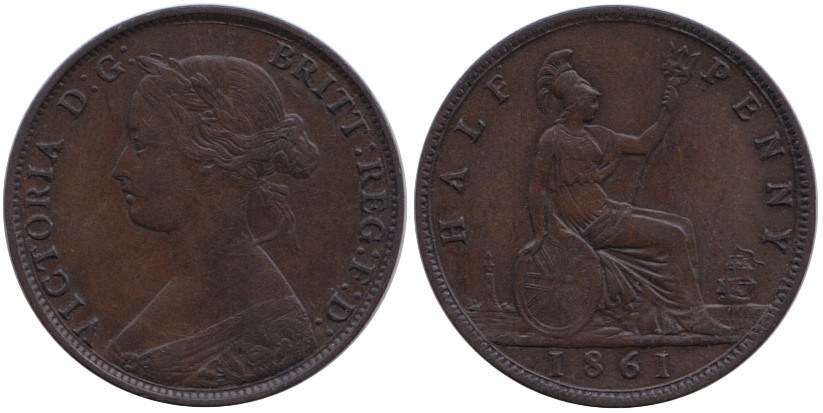
Victoria halfpenny 1861. Bronze, type "young head".

The halfpennies of Queen Victoria's long reign (1837–1901) can be basically divided into the copper issue of 1838–1860, where the coins were 9.1–9.5 grams in weight and 28 millimetres in diameter, and which were very similar to the halfpennies of her two predecessors (with the obvious substitution of REG for REX on the reverse), and the bronze issue of 1860–1901 (which itself is split between 1894 and 1895 into coins displaying the "young head" and the "old head" of the Queen). The bronze coins weighed 5.5–5.8 grams and were 25 millimetres in diameter. The bronze coins also featured the denomination HALF PENNY on the reverse for the first time, with the date in the exergue beneath Britannia. The inscription on the obverse of the "young head" coins reads VICTORIA D G BRITT REG F D, while on the "old head" it is VICTORIA DEI GRA BRITT REGINA FID DEF IND IMP. Some 1874–1876 and 1881–1882 halfpennies have an "H" mintmark underneath the date, indicating that they were produced at the Heaton mint in Birmingham. Halfpennies were produced in all years of Victoria's reign except 1837, 1840, 1842, 1849 and 1850.

Halfpennies weighing 5.67 grams (one fifth of an ounce) and of 1 inch (25 millimetres) diameter (which was to remain the standard size of the coin for the remainder of its existence) were minted in all years of King Edward VII's reign (1901–1910) except 1901. They are similar to the last issues of Queen Victoria except for the king's right-facing bust on the obverse, with the inscription EDWARDVS VII DEI GRA BRITT OMN REX FID DEF IND IMP, and also are extremely reminiscent of the contemporary penny.

The reign of King George V produced halfpennies to an unchanged design every year between 1911 and 1936. The obverse shows a left-facing portrait of the king by Sir Bertram Mackennal, with the inscription GEORGIVS V DEI GRA BRITT OMN REX FID DEF IND IMP, and the usual right-facing Britannia on the reverse. Unlike some of the pennies of this reign, no halfpennies have mintmarks from provincial mints. Halfpennies of this reign suffer somewhat from "ghosting", caused by production problems when the image of one side partly comes through to the other; efforts were made to solve the problem with a modification of the king's effigy in 1925, but the problem was not finally solved until a second modification in 1928.

A halfpenny exists for King Edward VIII, although strictly speaking it is a pattern which would have been awaiting royal approval about the time that the king abdicated in December 1936. The king insisted that his left profile be used on the coinage instead of the right, which would have been used if he had followed the alternating tradition going back to King Charles II; the obverse has the inscription EDWARDVS VIII D G BR OMN REX F D IND IMP, but in a complete break from tradition Britannia was dropped from the reverse for the first time since 1672, and replaced by a sailing ship, said to represent Sir Francis Drake's Golden Hind. This reverse remained in use for the remainder of the coins' existence.

Halfpennies of a similar design to his brother's were produced in each year of the reign of King George VI. The inscription on the obverse reads GEORGIVS VI D G BR OMN REX F D IND IMP until 1948, then GEORGIVS VI D G BR OMN REX FIDEI DEF. There are reported to be slight differences in the reverse – the size and positioning of the ship, the inscription HALF PENNY and the date under the ship – from year to year, but numismatists differ in opinion as to whether this is significant enough to count as a design variation each year, or just one design for the whole reign.

Unlike the penny, Queen Elizabeth II's reign produced halfpennies every year between 1953 and 1967, except for 1961. The reverse was the same as before, while the obverse featured the queen's head by Mary Gillick, with the inscription ELIZABETH II DEI GRA BRITT OMN REGINA F D in 1953, and ELIZABETH II DEI GRATIA REGINA F D for the rest of the reign.

The pre-decimal halfpenny ceased to be legal tender in 1969.

The new two pence coin, introduced when decimalisation of British coinage took effect in 1971, is essentially the same size as the halfpenny coin as it had most recently existed.

== Cricket connection ==
Broadhalfpenny Down, a place of great significance in the history of cricket, got its name from the coin.

== In popular culture ==
In a 1967 episode of the television series The Avengers, entitled "You Have Just Been Murdered", John Steed assembles 999,999 halfpennies before being made a 'halfpenny millionaire' courtesy of Mrs Peel. The sequence also shows a close up of a 1947 halfpenny reverse.
