= Farthing (English coin) =

Former coin of the Kingdom of England

English Farthing
- England
- Value: 1/4 of a Penny
- Composition: Silver/Copper
- Years of minting: 1279–1707

Obverse

Reverse

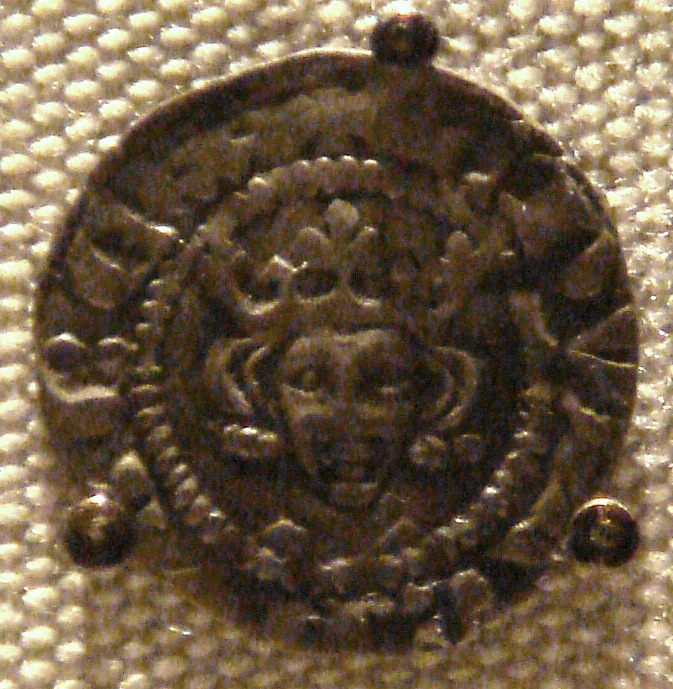
Farthing of Edward I

The English farthing (derived from the Anglo-Saxon feorthing, a fourthling or fourth part) was a coin of the Kingdom of England worth 1/4 of a penny, 1/960 of a pound sterling. Until the 13th century, farthings were pieces of pennies that had been cut into quarters to make change. The first English farthing coins were minted in the 13th century, and continued to be struck until the early 18th century, when England merged into the Kingdom of Great Britain in 1707.

Early farthings were silver. The first copper farthings were issued during the reign of James I, who gave a licence for minting them to John Harington, 1st Baron Harington of Exton. Licences were subsequently given out until after the Commonwealth, when the Royal Mint resumed production in 1672. In the late 17th century farthings were also minted in tin.

== Early farthings ==
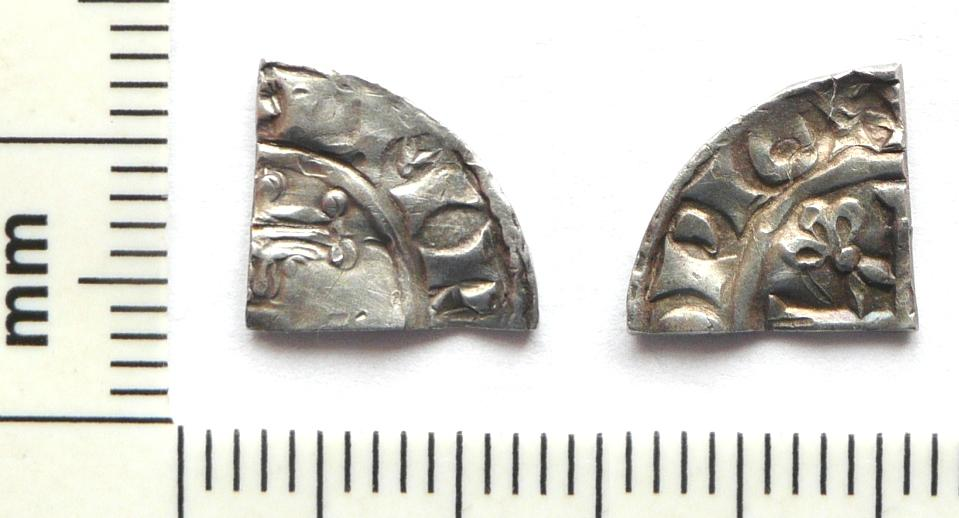
A cut farthing of William the Conqueror

Prior to the 13th century, the silver penny was virtually the only coin struck in England. Moneyers were permitted to cut pennies into halves and quarters to make change, making halfpennies and farthings. The cutting of pennies was prohibited in 1279, but the practice continued for many years.

The patent rolls from the reign of Henry III indicate that dies for producing silver halfpenny and farthing coins were issued to London moneyers on two occasions in 1222. The coins bear the short-cross design, which had been used on pennies since the reign of Henry II. The obverse shows a king holding a sceptre, with the legend HENRIREX ("King Henry"), while the reverse shows a small cross with three pellets in each quarter and the legend [NAME] ON LUND ("[Moneyer's Name] of London"). J. J. North speculates that the issue had a short duration; as of 2001, only five examples of Henry III silver farthing coins were known to exist.

As the smallest denomination, silver farthings were rarely hoarded.

== Silver farthing coins (1279–1553) ==
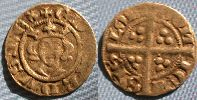
Edward I London farthing 1279

The first silver farthing coins of Edward I appeared in August 1279, after his court banned the cutting of pennies to make farthings and halfpennies. The coins had an average weight of 0.45 grammes and were made by further alloying sterling silver to debase the metal to 75% purity. In December 1280, the alloyed coins were replaced with sterling silver farthings with an average weight of 0.35 grammes. The coins weighed slightly less than 1/4 of a penny to account for the extra labor involved in producing one penny's worth of farthings. It is thought that the coins were made larger in order to make them easier to strike and handle, but coins of low fineness have never been popular in England and the population preferred the inconvenience of a smaller coin with higher silver content.

Contemporary records show that over four million farthings were produced during the reign of Edward I, but comparatively few have survived. By far the most prolific mint was London, identified on the reverse of the coin by LONDONIENSIS or CIVITAS LONDON or very rarely LONDRIENSIS, but they were also produced at Berwick (VILLA BEREVVICI), Bristol (VILLA BRISTOLLIE), Lincoln (CIVITAS LINCOL), Newcastle (NOVICASTRI), and York (CIVITAS EBORACI), but most of the provincial mints' output is rare today. Edward's farthings were of the long cross type reverse, and the usual legend on the obverse was EDWARDUS REX (King Edward), or occasionally E R ANGLIE (Edward King of England), and once ER ANGL DN (Edward King of England Lord (of Ireland)).

Only two mints, London and Berwick, produced farthings in the reign of King Edward II (1307–1327), and their output is classed as "rare" and "very rare" respectively. They are very similar to the coins of his father, and in fact the combination of their rarity and poor condition means that there has not been much research done into the farthings of this reign, although it does seem that for much of the reign farthings of Edward I continued to be produced occasionally.

Edward III's farthings (1327–1377), though fairly similar to his predecessors, are fairly easy to distinguish as the more common inscription on the obverse was EDWARDUS REX A (Edward King of England). Three mints produced farthings in this reign: London is most prolific, Berwick is rare, and only three examples are known of the output of the Reading mint (VILLA RADINGY). Edward III's farthings remain fairly rare. Although the normal fineness of silver used at this time was .925 (i.e. sterling silver), for the second coinage of 1335–1343 the London mint produced larger farthings of .833 silver.

King Richard II's (1377–1399) are rare in any condition. They were all struck at the London mint and bear the inscription RICARD REX ANGL (Richard King of England).

Henry IV issued farthings in both the "heavy" (pre 1412) and "light" (1412–13) coinages (20% lighter), although allowing for the prevalence of clipping it is quite difficult to distinguish between the two coinages at the size of the farthing. Both issues are rare and carry the obverse inscription HENRIC REX ANGL and the reverse inscription CIVITAS LONDON, although on the light coinage it appears as CIVITAS LOIDOI.

Henry V's single issue of farthings (1413–1422) is distinguishable from those of his father because his effigy shows his neck, but is more difficult to distinguish from those of Henry VI's first reign (1422–1461). Farthings of Henry V and Henry VI were produced in London and Calais (VILLA CALIS), though Henry V Calais farthings are extremely rare.

The first reign of King Edward IV (1461–1470) featured both a heavy coinage (before 1464), with the obverse inscription EDWARD REX ANGLI, and a light coinage inscribed EDWARD DI GRA REX, but they are all extremely rare and weight cannot be used to distinguish between the two issues because of wear, clipping, etc.

No farthings were produced during the second reigns of Henry VI and Edward IV, or during the brief reign of Edward V.

One exceedingly rare type of farthing was minted during the reign of Richard III (1483–1485). The obverse legend around the king's bust is RICAR DI GRA REX.

Only one very rare type of farthing was issued during the reign of King Henry VII (1485–1509), struck at the London mint. It has the unique inscription HENRIC DI GRA REX around the king's bust to distinguish it from the coins of the earlier Henries.

King Henry VIII (1509–1547) issued farthings struck at the London mint, in all three of his coinages, although they are all extremely rare. The obverse of the first coinage (1509–1526) has the inscription HENRIC DI GRA REX around a portcullis; while the second coinage (1526–1544) has the legend RUTILANS ROSA—a dazzling rose—around the portcullis, and the reverse has the legend DEO GRACIAS around a long cross. Farthings of the second coinage were also struck at Canterbury (distinguished by a Catherine wheel mintmark). The third coinage (1544–1547) was produced in base silver and has the legend h D G RUTIL ROSA around a rose, and the reverse legend DEO GRACIAS around a long cross with one pellet in each quarter.

A base silver farthing was issued by King Edward VI (1547–1553) with the inscription E D G ROSA SINE SPI around the portcullis on the obverse. This coin is also extremely rare.

No farthings were produced in the reigns of Queen Mary I, Philip and Mary, or Queen Elizabeth I, mainly because the silver farthing had simply become too small to be struck, following successive reductions in the weight of silver in the coin, and far too easy to lose.

== Royal farthing tokens (1613–1643) ==
It was during the reign of King James I (1603–1625) that copper coinage was introduced. From his previous experience as King of Scotland James realised that small denomination copper coins would be acceptable, as they had been in use in Scotland and on the European mainland for some time. However the English seemed to have an obsession with gold and silver, requiring that coins had their proper values' worth of metal. James decided not to have the copper coinage produced by the Royal Mint, but instead put the production of farthings into the hands of John Harington, 1st Baron Harington of Exton.

=== The Haringtons ===
Harington was heavily charged for the privilege of minting the farthings, but also made a healthy profit on the deal. Unlike the larger coins, farthings did not contain their value in metal. He died in 1613 and the right to produce farthings passed to his son, who also died a few months later, then back to Harington's wife Anne.

The Harington issues originally had a surface of tin which served to make counterfeiting more difficult and to make the coins look more like silver and therefore more acceptable. The coins were produced on blanks of 12.25 millimetres diameter. The obverse shows two sceptres through a crown, and the legend IACO DG MAG BRIT—James, by the grace of God, of Great Britain—while the reverse shows a crowned harp and the continuing inscription FRA ET HIB REX—France and Ireland, King.

=== Lennoxes ===
Lady Harington either sold or gave the privilege of minting farthings to Ludovic Stewart, 2nd Duke of Lennox. The Lennox issues are larger than the Haringtons. The Lennox issues were all produced on 15 millimetre diameter blanks, with no tin surface. They can be distinguished from the Haringtons by looking at the inscription on the obverse—on the Lennoxes the inscription starts at the top or bottom of the coin, while on the Haringtons it starts before the top of the coin.

=== Richmonds ===
During the reign of Charles I, (1625–1649), farthings continued to be produced under the king's licence. In 1623 the Duke of Lennox had also become Duke of Richmond, but died a few months later. The farthing patent passed to his widow, Frances Stewart, Duchess of Lennox, and Sir Francis Crane. The first issues of Charles I are consequently called Richmonds. The obverse shows two sceptres through a crown, and the legend CARO DG MAG BRIT—Charles, by the grace of God, of Great Britain—while the reverse shows a crowned harp and the continuing inscription FRA ET HIB REX—France and Ireland, King.

=== Maltravers ===
In 1634 another farthing patent was issued, to Henry Howard, Lord Maltravers, and Sir Francis Crane, their issues being known as Maltravers. The obverse shows two sceptres through a crown, and the legend CAROLVS DG MAG BR—Charles, by the grace of God, of Great Britain—while the reverse shows a crowned harp and the continuing inscription FRAN ET HIB REX—France and Ireland, King. These issues have inner circles on both sides of the coin, between the legend and the design element. During this time there were vast numbers of forged farthings in circulation and the situation became unacceptable as the poor felt conned and unfairly treated by the authorities.

=== Rose farthing ===
Consequently, Lord Maltravers was asked to introduce a new style denomination which came to be called the rose farthing—it was much smaller and thicker than the Maltravers, but the revolutionary development was the metal and construction of the coin; most of the coin was copper, but a small "plug" of brass was inserted into part of the coin. This made the rose farthing an early example of a bimetallic coin and also almost impossible to counterfeit, and the production of forgeries soon ended. The obverse shows two sceptres through a crown, and the legend CAROLVS DG MAG BRIT—Charles, by the grace of God, of Great Britain—while the reverse shows a double rose and the continuing inscription FRAN ET HIB REX—France and Ireland, King. These issues have inner circles on both sides of the coin, between the legend and the design element.

=== Commonwealth token farthings ===
Under the Commonwealth of England no farthings were issued by the government, although pattern farthings were produced. Huge quantities of private tokens were issued in this period by small traders or towns to satisfy demand.

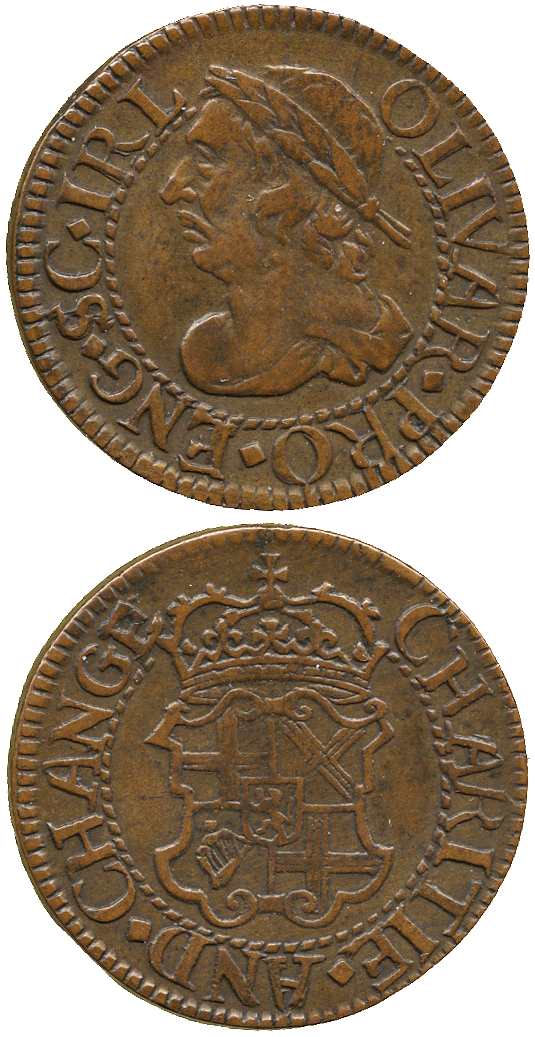
Commonwealth pattern farthing

== Copper and tin farthing coins (1672–1700) ==
In the early years of the reign of King Charles II (1660–1685) there was a clear need for low denomination coins to fund day-to-day purchases, witnessed by the large number of farthing tokens in circulation in the 1660s. The Mint was not ready to produce copper coins using the new machine presses until 1672, when a Royal Proclamation in August 1672 decreed that halfpennies and farthings would be issued, and that they would have a face value equal to the value of the metal less the cost of producing them. The new coins were legal tender up to a total value of six pence, and depicted Britannia (modelled by the Duchess of Richmond) on the reverse. It was soon discovered that the Mint was incapable of producing the copper blanks needed for the new coins, and these eventually were imported from Sweden.

The copper farthings were produced in 1672–1675 and 1679, weighed 5.2 - 6.4 grams, and had a diameter of 22–23 millimetres. The obverse had a left-facing bust of the king, with the inscription CAROLVS A CAROLO—Charles, son of Charles—while the reverse showed the left-facing seated Britannia, with the inscription BRITANNIA and the date in the exergue beneath Britannia.

In 1684 and 1685 farthings made of tin with a small central copper plug were produced – they weighed 5.4–6.0 grams and had a diameter of 23–24 millimetres, and had the same inscriptions as the copper farthings. Very few 1685 farthings were produced because the king died on 8 February 1684, in the Old-Style calendar (i.e. 18 February 1685 in the "New-Style" calendar adopted by the British Empire in 1752; in the old style, 24 March 1684 would be followed by 25 March 1685, New Year's Day). The tin farthings had an inscription NVMMORVM FAMVLVS – a subsidiary coinage – plus the date on the edge rather than on the reverse.

For the reign of king James II, the copper-plugged tin farthings continued to be produced, with examples dated in all years between 1684 and 1687. The obverse had a right-facing bust of the king, with the inscription IACOBVS SECVNDVS – James the Second—while the reverse showed the left-facing seated Britannia, with the inscription BRITANNIA, and the inscription NVMMORVM FAMVLVS and the date on the edge of the coin.

Tin farthings continued to be produced for the first few years of the joint reign of William III and Mary II, being dated 1689–1692, but the coins were rapidly becoming unpopular as the problems of the corrosion of tin became apparent. In 1693 and 1694 copper farthings were produced again, weighing 4.7–6.2 grams and with a diameter of 22–25 millimetres. In both issues, the obverse shows the conjoined heads of the co-monarchs, with the inscription GVLIELMVS ET MARIA.

Following the death of Queen Mary in 1694, the production of coins continued under the same contract as before, with farthings of King William III being produced for all years between 1695 and 1700. However it soon became apparent that the manufacturers were economising on expenses – cheap labour was being used, including foreigners some of whom could not spell the king's name which they were engraving on the dies. By 1698 there was a glut of copper coinage and an Act was passed to stop the coining for one year; this seems to have had little effect and the proliferation continued. There were further Parliamentary attempts to control the glut of coinage later.

== See also ==
- Coins of the pound sterling
- Penny (English coin)
