= Farthing =

Farthing or farthings may refer to:

== Coinage ==
- Farthing (British coin), an old British coin valued one quarter of a penny
  - Half farthing (British coin)
  - Third farthing (British coin)
  - Quarter farthing (British coin)
- Farthing (English coin), the predecessor to the British farthing, prior to the union of England and Scotland
  - English Three Farthing coin
- Farthing (Irish coin), its counterpart among the pre-decimal Irish coins
- Farthing, used in the King James Version and Douay–Rheims translations of the Bible to translate κοδράντης (kodrantes, quadrans) and ἀσσάριον (assarion, as), both Roman coins

== Arts, entertainment, and media ==
- Farthing (magazine), a defunct British science fiction magazine
- Farthing (novel), a 2006 novel written by Jo Walton
- Farthings (Middle-earth), the four quarter divisions of the Shire
- Timothy Farthing, a fictional character from Dad's Army

== People ==
- Alan Farthing (born 1963), British obstetrician and Surgeon-Gynaecologist to the Royal Household
- Alfred Farthing (1872–1953), Australian politician
- Alfred Farthing Robbins (1856−1931), British journalist, political biographer and freemason
- Charles Farthing (1953–2014), New Zealand AIDS doctor
- Dan Farthing (born 1969), Canadian wide receiver player of Canadian football in the CFL
- Hugh Farthing (1892–1968), Canadian politician
- Jack Farthing (born 1985), English actor
- John Farthing (1897–1954), Canadian philosopher
- John Farthing (bishop) (1861–1947), Canadian priest and Anglican Bishop of Montreal
- Matt Farthing, British musician and sole member of Stay+
- Michael Farthing (born 1948), British medical researcher
- Paul Farthing (1887–1976), American jurist
- Pen Farthing (born 1969), British former Royal Marines commando
- Robert Farthing (fl. 1394–1397), English politician
- Stephen Farthing (born 1950), British painter
- Walter Farthing (1887–1954), British politician

== Places ==
- Farthing, Wyoming (also known as Iron Mountain), a railroad station and post office in Wyoming
- Farthing Common, a common in East Kent, UK
- Farthing Downs, an open space in Croydon, London, UK
- Farthings of Iceland, historical administrative divisions of Iceland
- Farthings Wood, a woodland in Buckinghamshire, UK
- Farthing Horn, subsidiary ridge of Denali to the north of the main peak
- Stoke Farthing, a hamlet in Wiltshire, England
