= 4/20 =

4/20 may refer to:

- 1/5, or one fifth
- April 20, events that happened on the 20th day of the 4th month in the Gregorian calendar
- 420 (cannabis culture), code-term that refers to the consumption of cannabis

== See also ==
- "4 + 20", a song by Crosby, Stills, Nash & Young, written by Stephen Stills
- 1/5, a disambiguation page
