= Coins of the pound sterling =

British current and historic coinage

Examples of the standard reverse designs minted until 2008. Designed by Christopher Ironside (£2 coin is not shown).

The standard circulating coinage of the pound sterling is denominated in pounds (symbol "£", ISO 4217 code GBP) divided into 100 pence, and values range (for coins in circulation) from one penny to two pounds. Before decimalisation in 1971, twelve pence made each shilling, and twenty shillings made a pound. Until decimalisation, circulating coinage ranged from the halfpenny to the crown (five shillings). As a prelude to full decimalisation, coins marked as 5, 10 and 50 new pence had circulated from 1968 (5p and 10p) and 1969 (50p) which until 1971 were valid for the amounts of one, two and ten shillings respectively.

British coins are minted by the Royal Mint in Llantrisant, Wales (though some Crown Dependencies and Overseas Territories have their own mint of sterling). The Royal Mint also commissions the coins' designs; however they also have to be accepted by the reigning monarch.

In addition to the circulating coinage, the UK also mints commemorative decimal coins (crowns) in the denomination of five pounds, ceremonial Maundy money in denominations of 1, 2, 3 and 4 pence in sterling (.925) silver; bullion coinage of gold sovereigns, half sovereigns, and gold and silver Britannia coins is also produced. Some territories outside the United Kingdom, which use the pound sterling, produce their own coinage, with the same denominations and specifications as the UK coinage but with local designs; these coins are not legal tender in the mainland United Kingdom.

== Currently circulating coinage ==
The current decimal coins consist of:

- one penny and two pence in copper-plated steel
- five pence and ten pence in nickel-plated steel
- equilateral curve heptagonal twenty pence and fifty pence in cupronickel
- bimetallic one pound and two pounds.

All circulating coins have an effigy of one of two monarchs on the obverse; various national, regional and commemorative designs on the reverse; and the denomination in numbers or words.

Elizabeth II
The obverse carries an abbreviated Latin inscription whose full form, ELIZABETH II DEI GRATIA REGINA FIDEI DEFENSATRIX, translates to "Elizabeth II, by the grace of God, Queen and Defender of the Faith". The denomination is usually on the reverse.
Charles III
The obverse carries an abbreviated, anglicised Latin inscription whose full form, CHARLES III DEI GRATIA REX FIDEI DEFENSOR, translates to "Charles III, by the grace of God, King and Defender of the Faith". The denomination may be on either side.

Details of coins
Denomination	Obverse	Reverse	Diameter	Thickness	Mass	Composition	Edge	Introduced
One penny	Queen Elizabeth II	Crowned portcullis with chains (1971–2008); Segment of the Royal Arms (2008–2022)	20.3 mm	1.52 mm	3.56 g	Bronze (97% copper, 2.5% zinc, 0.5% tin)	Smooth	1971
One penny	Queen Elizabeth II	Crowned portcullis with chains (1971–2008); Segment of the Royal Arms (2008–2022)	20.3 mm	1.65 mm	3.56 g	Copper-plated steel	Smooth	1992
One penny	King Charles III	Hazel dormouse	20.3 mm	1.65 mm	3.56 g	Copper-plated steel	Smooth	2023
Two pence	Queen Elizabeth II	Plume of ostrich feathers within a coronet (1971–2008); Segment of the Royal Arms (2008–2022)	25.9 mm	1.85 mm	7.12 g	Bronze	Smooth	1971
Two pence	Queen Elizabeth II	Plume of ostrich feathers within a coronet (1971–2008); Segment of the Royal Arms (2008–2022)	25.9 mm	2.03 mm	7.12 g	Copper-plated steel	Smooth	1992
Two pence	King Charles III	Red squirrel	25.9 mm	2.03 mm	7.12 g	Copper-plated steel	Smooth	Not in circulation
Five pence (Note: The specifications and dates of introduction of the 5p, 10p, and 50p coins refer to the current versions. These coins were originally issued in larger sizes in 1968 and 1969 respectively.)	Queen Elizabeth II	Crowned thistle (1968–2008); Segment of the Royal Arms (2008–2022)	18 mm	1.7 mm	3.25 g	Cupronickel (3:1)	Milled	1990
Five pence	Queen Elizabeth II	Crowned thistle (1968–2008); Segment of the Royal Arms (2008–2022)	18 mm	1.89 mm	3.25 g	Nickel-plated steel	Milled	2012
Five pence	King Charles III	Oak tree leaf	18 mm	1.89 mm	3.25 g	Nickel-plated steel	Milled	2025
Ten pence	Queen Elizabeth II	Crowned lion (1968–2008); Segment of the Royal Arms (2008–2022)	24.5 mm	1.85 mm	6.5 g	Cupronickel (3:1)	Milled	1992
Ten pence	Queen Elizabeth II	Crowned lion (1968–2008); Segment of the Royal Arms (2008–2022)	24.5 mm	2.05 mm	6.5 g	Nickel-plated steel	Milled	2012
Ten pence	King Charles III	Capercaillie	24.5 mm	2.05 mm	6.5 g	Nickel-plated steel	Milled	2026
Twenty pence	Queen Elizabeth II	Crowned Tudor Rose	21.4 mm	1.7 mm	5 g	Cupronickel (5:1)	Smooth, Reuleaux heptagon	1982
Twenty pence	Queen Elizabeth II	Segment of the Royal Arms	21.4 mm	1.7 mm	5 g	Cupronickel (5:1)	Smooth, Reuleaux heptagon	2008
Twenty pence	King Charles III	Puffin	21.4 mm	1.7 mm	5 g	Cupronickel (5:1)	Smooth, Reuleaux heptagon	Not in circulation
Fifty pence	Queen Elizabeth II	Britannia and lion	27.3 mm	1.78 mm	8 g	Cupronickel (3:1)	Smooth, Reuleaux heptagon	1997
Fifty pence	Queen Elizabeth II	Various commemorative designs	27.3 mm	1.78 mm	8 g	Cupronickel (3:1)	Smooth, Reuleaux heptagon	1998
Fifty pence	Queen Elizabeth II	Segment of the Royal Arms	27.3 mm	1.78 mm	8 g	Cupronickel (3:1)	Smooth, Reuleaux heptagon	2008
Fifty pence	King Charles III	Various commemorative designs	27.3 mm	1.78 mm	8 g	Cupronickel (3:1)	Smooth, Reuleaux heptagon	December 2022
Fifty pence	King Charles III	Atlantic salmon	27.3 mm	1.78 mm	8 g	Cupronickel (3:1)	Smooth, Reuleaux heptagon	2023
One pound	Queen Elizabeth II	Rose, leek, thistle, and shamrock encircled by a coronet	23.03–23.43 mm	2.8 mm	8.75 g	Inner: Nickel-plated alloy Outer: Nickel-brass	Alternately milled and plain (12-sided)	28 March 2017
One pound	King Charles III	Bees	23.03–23.43 mm	2.8 mm	8.75 g	Inner: Nickel-plated alloy Outer: Nickel-brass	Alternately milled and plain (12-sided)	2024
Two pounds (Note: This coin was originally issued in a smaller size in a single metal in 1986 for special issues only. It was redesigned as a bi-metallic issue for general circulation in 1997.)	Queen Elizabeth II	Abstract concentric design representing technological development	28.4 mm	2.5 mm	12 g	Inner: Cupronickel; Outer: Nickel-brass	Milled with variable inscription and/or decoration	1997 (issued 1998)
Two pounds	Queen Elizabeth II	Various commemorative designs	28.4 mm	2.5 mm	12 g	Inner: Cupronickel; Outer: Nickel-brass	Milled with variable inscription and/or decoration	1999
Two pounds	Queen Elizabeth II	Britannia	28.4 mm	2.5 mm	12 g	Inner: Cupronickel; Outer: Nickel-brass	Milled with variable inscription and/or decoration	2015
Two pounds	King Charles III	Various commemorative designs	28.4 mm	2.5 mm	12 g	Inner: Cupronickel; Outer: Nickel-brass	Milled with variable inscription and/or decoration	2023
Two pounds	King Charles III	National flowers: rose, daffodil, thistle and shamrock	28.4 mm	2.5 mm	12 g	Inner: Cupronickel; Outer: Nickel-brass	Milled with variable inscription and/or decoration	Not in circulation

=== Production and distribution ===
All genuine UK coins are produced by the Royal Mint. The same coinage is used across the United Kingdom: unlike banknotes, local issues of coins are not produced for different parts of the UK. The pound coin until 2016 was produced in regional designs, but these circulate equally in all parts of the UK (see UK designs, below).

Every year, newly minted coins are checked for size, weight, and composition at a Trial of the Pyx. Essentially the same procedure has been used since the 13th century. Assaying is now done by the Worshipful Company of Goldsmiths on behalf of HM Treasury.

The 1p and 2p coins from 1971 are the oldest standard-issue coins still in circulation. Pre-decimal crowns are the oldest coins in general that are still legal tender, although they are in practice never encountered in general circulation.

Coins from the British dependencies and territories that use sterling as their currency are sometimes found in change in other jurisdictions. Strictly, they are not legal tender in the United Kingdom; however, since they have the same specifications as UK coins, they are sometimes tolerated in commerce, and can readily be used in vending machines.

UK-issued coins are, on the other hand, generally fully accepted and freely mixed in other British dependencies and territories that use the pound.

An extensive coinage redesign was commissioned by the Royal Mint in 2005, and new designs were gradually introduced into the circulating British coinage from summer 2008. Except for the £1 coin and the earlier, larger 5p, 10p and 50p pieces, the pre-2008 coins remain legal tender and are expected to stay in circulation for the foreseeable future.

The Royal Mint no longer publishes estimates of each coin in circulation, and gives an overall estimate of 27 billion (27 thousand million) as of August 2026. The estimated volume of each coin in circulation in March 2016 was:

Denomination	Number of pieces (millions)	Face value (£m)
Two pounds	479	957.036
One pound	1,671	1,671.328
Fifty pence	1,053	526.153
Twenty-five pence	81	20
Twenty pence	3,004	600.828
Ten pence	1,713	171.312
Five pence	4,075	203.764
Two pence	6,714	134.273
One penny	11,430	114.299
Total	30,139	4,643.658

== History of pre-decimal coinage ==
Because of trade links with Charlemagne's Frankish Empire, the Anglo-Saxon kingdoms copied the Frankish currency system of 12 deniers ("d", pennies) to the sou (shilling) and 240 deniers or 20 sous to the libra ("£", pound), the origin of the name of the current British currency. It referred to the literal weight of 240 penny coins, which at 30 grains each, weighed 1 tower pound of sterling (0.925 fine) silver. At this point and for centuries, pennies were the only coins struck; shillings and pounds were only units of account.

=== The penny before 1500 ===
The English silver penny first appeared in the 8th century CE in adoption of Western Europe's Carolingian monetary system wherein 12 pence made a shilling and 20 shillings made a pound. The weight of the English penny was fixed at 22 1/2 troy grains (about 1.46 grams) by Offa of Mercia, an 8th-century contemporary of Charlemagne; 240 pennies weighed 5,400 grains or a tower pound (different from the troy pound of 5,760 grains). The silver penny was the only coin minted for 500 years, from c. 780 to 1280.

From the time of Charlemagne until the 12th century, the silver currency of England was made from the highest purity silver available. But there were disadvantages to minting currency of fine silver, notably the level of wear it suffered, and the ease with which coins could be "clipped", or trimmed. In 1158 a new standard for English coinage was established by Henry II with the "Tealby Penny" – the sterling silver standard of 92.5% silver and 7.5% copper. This was a harder-wearing alloy, yet it was still a rather high grade of silver. It went some way towards discouraging the practice of "clipping", though this practice was further discouraged and largely eliminated with the introduction of the milled edge seen on coins today.

The weight of a silver penny stayed constant at above 22 grains until 1344; afterwards its weight was reduced to 18 grains in 1351, to 15 grains in 1412, to 12 grains in 1464, and to 10 1/2 grains in 1527.

The history of the Royal Mint stretches back to AD 886. For many centuries production was in London, initially at the Tower of London, and then at premises nearby in Tower Hill in what is today known as Royal Mint Court. In the 1970s production was transferred to Llantrisant in South Wales. Historically Scotland and England had separate coinage; the last Scottish coins were struck in 1709 shortly after union with England.

=== The penny after 1500 ===
During the reign of Henry VIII, the silver content was gradually debased, reaching a low of one-third silver. However, in Edward VI's reign in 1551, this debased coinage was discontinued in favor of a return to sterling silver with the penny weighing 8 grains. The first crowns and half-crowns were produced that year. From this point onwards till 1920, sterling was the rule.

Coins were originally hand-hammered – an ancient technique in which two dies are struck together with a blank coin between them. This was the traditional method of manufacturing coins in the Western world from the classical Greek era onwards, in contrast with Asia, where coins were traditionally cast. Milled (that is, machine-made) coins were produced first during the reign of Elizabeth I (1558–1603) and periodically during the subsequent reigns of James I and Charles I, but there was initially opposition to mechanisation from the moneyers, who ensured that most coins continued to be produced by hammering. All British coins produced since 1662 have been milled.

By 1601 it was decreed that one troy ounce or 480 grains of sterling silver be minted into 62 pennies (i.e. each penny weighed 7.742 grains). By 1696, the currency had been seriously weakened by an increase in clipping during the Nine Years' War to the extent that it was decided to recall and replace all hammered silver coinage in circulation. The exercise came close to disaster due to fraud and mismanagement, but was saved by the personal intervention of Isaac Newton after his appointment as Warden of the Mint, a post which was intended to be a sinecure, but which he took seriously. Newton was subsequently given the post of Master of the Mint in 1699. Following the 1707 union between the Kingdom of England and the Kingdom of Scotland, Newton used his previous experience to direct the 1707–1710 Scottish recoinage, resulting in a common currency for the new Kingdom of Great Britain. After 15 September 1709 no further silver coins were ever struck in Scotland.

As a result of a report written by Newton on 21 September 1717 to the Lords Commissioners of His Majesty's Treasury the bimetallic relationship between gold coins and silver coins was changed by royal proclamation on 22 December 1717, forbidding the exchange of gold guineas for more than 21 silver shillings. Due to differing valuations in other European countries this unintentionally resulted in a silver shortage, as silver coins were used to pay for imports, while exports were paid for in gold, effectively moving Britain from the silver standard to its first gold standard, rather than the bimetallic standard implied by the proclamation.

The coinage reform of 1816 set up a weight/value ratio and physical sizes for silver coins. Each troy ounce of sterling silver was henceforth minted into 66 pence or 5 1/2 shillings.

In 1920, the silver content of all British coins was reduced from 92.5% to 50%, with some of the remainder consisting of manganese, which caused the coins to tarnish to a very dark colour after they had been in circulation for long. Silver was eliminated altogether in 1947, except for Maundy coinage, which returned to the pre-1920 92.5% silver composition.

The 1816 weight/value ratio and size system survived the debasement of silver in 1920, and the adoption of token coins of cupronickel in 1947. It even persisted after decimalisation for those coins which had equivalents and continued to be minted with their values in new pence. The UK finally abandoned it in 1992 when smaller, more convenient, "silver" coins were introduced.

== History of decimal coinage ==
=== Decimalisation ===
Since decimalisation on 15 February 1971 the pound (symbol "£") has been divided into 100 pence. (Prior to decimalisation the pound was divided into 20 shillings, each of 12 [old] pence; thus, there were 240 [old] pence to the pound.) The pound remained as Britain's currency unit after decimalisation (unlike in many other British commonwealth countries, which dropped the pound upon decimalisation by introducing dollars or new units worth 10 shillings or 1/2 pound). The following coins were introduced with these reverse designs:

- Half penny, 1971–1984: A crown, symbolising the monarch.
- One penny, 1971–2007: A crowned portcullis with chains (the badge of the Houses of Parliament).
- Two pence, 1971–2007: The Prince of Wales's feathers: a plume of ostrich feathers within a coronet.
- Five pence, 1968–2007: The Badge of Scotland, a thistle royally crowned.
- Ten pence, 1968–2007: The lion of England royally crowned.
- Fifty pence, 1969–2007: Britannia and lion.

The first decimal coins – the five pence (5p) and ten pence (10p) — were introduced in 1968 in the run-up to decimalisation in order to familiarise the public with the new system. These initially circulated alongside the pre-decimal coinage and had the same size and value as the existing one shilling and two shilling coins respectively. The fifty pence (50p) coin followed in 1969, replacing the old ten shilling note. The remaining decimal coins – at the time, the half penny (1/2p), penny (1p) and two pence (2p) — were issued in 1971 at decimalisation. A quarter-penny coin, to be struck in aluminium, was proposed at the time decimalisation was being planned, but was never minted.

The new coins were initially marked with the wording NEW PENNY (singular) or NEW PENCE (plural). The word "new" was dropped in 1982. The symbol "p" was adopted to distinguish the new pennies from the old, which used the symbol "d" (from the Latin denarius, a coin used in the Roman Empire).

=== Updates 1982–1998 ===
In the years since decimalisation, a number of changes have been made to the coinage; these new denominations were introduced with the following designs:

- Twenty pence, 1982–2007: A crowned Tudor Rose, a traditional heraldic emblem of England (with incuse design and lettering).
- One pound (round), 1983–2016: various designs; see One pound (British coin).
- Two pounds, 1997–2014: An abstract design of concentric circles, representing technological development from the Iron Age to the modern-day electronic age.

Additionally:

- The halfpenny was discontinued in 1984.
- The composition of the 1p and 2p was changed in 1992 from bronze to copper-plated steel without changing the design.
- The sizes of the 5p, 10p and 50p coins were reduced in 1990, 1992 and 1997, respectively, also without changing the design.

The twenty pence (20p) coin was introduced in 1982 to fill the gap between the 10p and 50p coins. The pound coin (£1) was introduced in 1983 to replace the Bank of England £1 banknote which was discontinued in 1984 (although the Scottish banks continued producing them for some time afterwards; the last of them, the Royal Bank of Scotland £1 note, is still issued in a small volume as of 2021). The designs on the £1 coin changed annually in a largely five-year cycle, until the introduction of the new 12-sided £1 coin in 2017.

The decimal halfpenny coin was demonetised in 1984 as its value was by then too small to be useful. The pre-decimal sixpence, shilling and two shilling coins, which had continued to circulate alongside the decimal coinage with values of 2 1/2p, 5p and 10p respectively, were finally withdrawn in 1980, 1990 and 1993 respectively. The double florin and crown, with values of 20p and 25p respectively, have technically not been withdrawn, but in practice are never seen in general circulation.

In the 1990s, the Royal Mint reduced the sizes of the 5p, 10p, and 50p coins. As a consequence, the oldest 5p coins in circulation date from 1990, the oldest 10p coins from 1992 and the oldest 50p coins come from 1997. Since 1997, many special commemorative designs of 50p have been issued. Some of these are found fairly frequently in circulation and some are rare. They are all legal tender.

In 1992 the composition of the 1p and 2p coins was changed from bronze to copper-plated steel. Due to their high copper content (97%), the intrinsic value of pre-1992 1p and 2p coins increased with the surge in metal prices of the mid-2000s, until by 2006 the coins would, if melted down, have been worth about 50% more than their face value.

A circulating bimetallic two pound (£2) coin was introduced in 1998 (first minted in, and dated, 1997). There had previously been unimetallic commemorative £2 coins which did not normally circulate. This tendency to use the two pound coin for commemorative issues has continued since the introduction of the bimetallic coin, and a few of the older unimetallic coins have since entered circulation.

There are also commemorative issues of crowns. Until 1981, these had a face value of twenty-five pence (25p), equivalent to the five shilling crown used in pre-decimal Britain. However, in 1990 crowns were redenominated with a face value of five pounds (£5) as the previous value was considered insufficient for such a high-status coin. The size and weight of the coin remained exactly the same. Decimal crowns are generally not found in circulation as their market value is likely to be higher than their face value, but they remain legal tender.

=== Obverse designs ===
All modern British coins feature a profile of the current monarch's head on the obverse. Until 2022, there had been only one monarch since decimalisation, Queen Elizabeth II, and her head appeared on all decimal coins minted up to that date, facing to the right (see also Monarch's profile, below). Five different effigies were used, reflecting the Queen's changing appearance as she aged. They were created by Mary Gillick (for coins minted until 1968), Arnold Machin (1968–1984), Raphael Maklouf (1985–1997), Ian Rank-Broadley (1998–2015), and Jody Clark (from 2015). In September 2022, the first portrait of Charles III was revealed, designed by Martin Jennings.

Most current coins carry a Latin inscription whose full form is ELIZABETH II DEI GRATIA REGINA FIDEI DEFENSATRIX, meaning "Elizabeth II, by the grace of God, Queen and Defender of the Faith". The inscription appears in any of several abbreviated forms, typically ELIZABETH II D G REG F D. Those minted and circulated after the accession of Charles III are inscribed with CHARLES III DEI GRATIA REX FIDEI DEFENSOR, typically abbreviated as CHARLES III D G REX F D or CHARLES III DEI GRA REX FID DEF.

=== 2008 redesign ===
In 2008, UK coins underwent an extensive redesign which eventually changed the reverse designs of all coins, the first wholesale change to British coinage since the first decimal coins were introduced in April 1968. The major design feature was the introduction of a reverse design shared across six coins (1p, 2p, 5p, 10p, 20p, 50p), that can be pieced together to form an image of the Royal Shield. This was the first time a coin design had been featured across multiple coins in this way. To summarize the reverse design changes made in 2008 and afterwards:

- The 1p coin depicts the lower part of the first quarter and the upper part of the third quarter of the shield, showing the lions passant of England and the harp of Ireland respectively
- The 2p coin depicts most of the second quarter of the shield, showing the lion rampant of Scotland
- The 5p coin depicts the centre of the shield, showing the meeting and parts of the constituent parts of the shield
- The 10p coin depicts most of the first quarter of the shield, containing the three lions passant of England
- The 20p coin depicts the lower part of the second quarter and upper part of the fourth quarter, showing the lion rampant of Scotland and the lions passant of England respectively
- The 50p coin depicts the point of the shield and the bottom portions of the second and third quarters showing the harp of Ireland and lions passant of England respectively
- The round, nickel-brass £1 coin from 2008 to 2016 depicted the whole of the Royal Shield. From 2017 it was changed to a bimetallic 12-sided coin depicting a rose, leek, thistle and shamrock bound by a crown.
- The £2 coin from 2015 depicts Britannia.

The original intention was to exclude both the £1 and £2 coins from the redesign because they were "relatively new additions" to the coinage, but it was later decided to include a £1 coin with a complete Royal Shield design from 2008 to 2016, and the 2015 redesign of the £2 coin occurred due to complaints over the disappearance of Britannia's image from the 50p coin in 2008.

On all coins, the beading (ring of small dots) around the edge of the obverses has been removed. The obverse of the 20p coin has also been amended to incorporate the year, which had been on the reverse of the coin since its introduction in 1982 (giving rise to an unusual issue of a mule version without any date at all). The orientation of both sides of the 50p coin has been rotated through 180 degrees, meaning the bottom of the coin is now a corner rather than a flat edge. The numerals showing the decimal value of each coin, previously present on all coins except the £1 and £2, have been removed, leaving the values spelled out in words only.

The redesign was the result of a competition launched by the Royal Mint in August 2005, which closed on 14 November 2005. The competition was open to the public and received over 4,000 entries. The winning entry was unveiled on 2 April 2008, designed by Matthew Dent. The Royal Mint stated the new designs were "reflecting a twenty-first century Britain". An advisor to the Royal Mint described the new coins as "post-modern" and said that this was something that could not have been done 50 years previously.

The redesign was criticised by some for having no specifically Welsh symbol (such as the Welsh Dragon), because the Royal Shield does not include a specifically Welsh symbol. Wrexham Member of Parliament (MP) Ian Lucas, who was also campaigning to have the Welsh Dragon included on the Union Flag, called the omission "disappointing", and stated that he would be writing to the Queen to request that the Royal Standard be changed to include Wales. The Royal Mint stated that "the Shield of the Royal Arms is symbolic of the whole of the United Kingdom and as such, represents Wales, Scotland, England and Northern Ireland." Designer Dent stated "I am a Welshman and proud of it, but I never thought about the fact we did not have a dragon or another representation of Wales on the design because as far as I am concerned Wales is represented on the Royal Arms. This was never an issue for me."

The Royal Mint's choice of an inexperienced coin designer to produce the new coinage was criticised by Virginia Ironside, daughter of Christopher Ironside who designed the previous UK coins. She stated that the new designs were "totally unworkable as actual coins", due to the loss of a numerical currency identifier, and the smaller typeface used.

The German news magazine Der Spiegel claimed that the redesign signalled the UK's intention "not to join the euro any time soon".

=== Changes after 2008 ===
As of 2012, 5p and 10p coins have been issued in nickel-plated steel, and much of the remaining cupronickel types withdrawn, in order to retrieve more expensive metals. The new coins are 11% thicker to maintain the same weight. There are heightened nickel allergy concerns over the new coins. Studies commissioned by the Royal Mint found no increased discharge of nickel from the coins when immersed in artificial sweat. However, an independent study found that the friction from handling results in four times as much nickel exposure as from the older-style coins. Sweden already plans to desist from using nickel in coins from 2015.

In 2016, the £1 coin's composition was changed from a single-metal round shape to a 12-sided bi-metal design, with a slightly larger diameter, and with multiple past designs discontinued in favour of a single, unchanging design. Production of the new coins started in 2016, with the first, dated 2016, entering circulation 28 March 2017.

In February 2015, the Royal Mint announced a new design for the £2 coin featuring Britannia by Antony Dufort, with no change to its bimetallic composition.

Edge inscriptions on British coins used to be commonly encountered on round £1 coins of 1983–2016, but are nowadays found only on £2 coins. The standard-issue £2 coin from 1997 to 2015 carried the edge inscription STANDING ON THE SHOULDERS OF GIANTS. The redesigned coin since 2015 has a new edge inscription QUATUOR MARIA VINDICO, Latin for "I will claim the four seas", an inscription previously found on coins bearing the image of Britannia. Other commemorative £2 coins have their own unique edge inscriptions or designs.

=== 2023 redesign ===
In October 2023 the Royal Mint announced new designs for the circulating coinage, which were to be released by the end of the year. The new designs feature a portrait of King Charles III facing left on the obverse, with a small Tudor Crown privy mark behind the King's neck. The reverses are divided vertically. The leftmost third comprises a background of three interlocking “C”s (reminiscent of the ones on the coins of King Charles II) and the face value indicated in Arabic numerals (addressing criticism regarding the 2008 redesign’s lack thereof). The remaining two-thirds of each design features an animal or plant representing each of the four nations:

- 1p depicts the hazel dormouse.
- 2p depicts the red squirrel.
- 5p depicts English oak tree leaves and acorns.
- 10p depicts a western capercaillie.
- 20p depicts an Atlantic puffin.
- 50p depicts an Atlantic salmon.
- £1 depicts two bees.
- £2 depicts the four heraldic flowers of the United Kingdom: Tudor rose, thistle, daffodil and shamrock, with the edge inscription IN SERVITIO OMNIUM, Latin for “In the service of all”, taken from the King's inaugural address on 9 September 2022.

=== Obsolete denominations ===
The following decimal coins have been withdrawn from circulation and have ceased to be legal tender.

Denomination	Obverse	Reverse	Diameter	Thickness	Mass	Composition	Edge	Introduced	Withdrawn
Half Penny	Queen Elizabeth II	St Edward's Crown	17.4 mm	1 mm	1.78 g	Bronze	Smooth	1971	1984
Five pence*	Queen Elizabeth II	Crowned Thistle	23.59 mm	1.7 mm	5.65 g	Cupronickel	Milled	1968	1990
Ten pence*	Queen Elizabeth II	Crowned Lion	28.5 mm	1.85 mm	11.31 g	Cupronickel	Milled	1968	1992
Fifty pence*	Queen Elizabeth II	Seated Britannia alongside a Lion	30.0 mm	2.5 mm	13.5 g	Cupronickel	Smooth Reuleaux heptagon	1969	1997
Fifty pence*	Queen Elizabeth II	Various commemorative designs	30.0 mm	2.5 mm	13.5 g	Cupronickel	Smooth Reuleaux heptagon	1973	1997
One pound†	Queen Elizabeth II	Numerous different designs	22.5 mm	3.15 mm	9.5 g	Nickel-brass	Milled with variable inscription and/or decoration	1983	15 October 2017
One pound†	Queen Elizabeth II	Royal Shield	22.5 mm	3.15 mm	9.5 g	Nickel-brass	Milled with variable inscription and/or decoration	2008	15 October 2017
Two pounds	Queen Elizabeth II	No standard reverse design	28.4 mm	~3 mm	15.98 g	Nickel-brass	Milled with variable inscription and/or decoration	1986	1998

* The specifications and dates of 5p, 10p, and 50p coins refer to the larger sizes issued since 1968.

† The specification refers to the round coin issued from 1983 to 2016. Although obsolete, this coin is still redeemable at banks and the British railway systems.

== Commemorative issues ==
=== Circulating commemorative designs ===
Circulating fifty pence and two pound coins have been issued with various commemorative reverse designs, typically to mark the anniversaries of historical events or the births of notable people.

Three commemorative designs were issued of the large version of the 50p: in 1973 (the EEC), 1992–3 (EC presidency) and 1994 (D-Day anniversary). Commemorative designs of the smaller 50p coin have been issued (alongside the Britannia standard issue) in 1998 (two designs), 2000, and from 2003 to 2007 yearly (two designs in 2006). For a complete list, see Fifty pence (British decimal coin).

Prior to 1997, the two pound coin was minted in commemorative issues only – in 1986, 1989, 1994, 1995 and 1996. Commemorative £2 coins have been regularly issued since 1999, alongside the standard-issue bi-metallic coins which were introduced in 1997. One or two designs have been minted each year, with the exception of none in 2000, and four regional 2002 issues marking the 2002 Commonwealth Games in Manchester. As well as a distinct reverse design, these coins have an edge inscription relevant to the subject. The anniversary themes are continued until at least 2009, with two designs announced. For a complete list, see Two pounds (British decimal coin).

From 2018 to 2019 a series of 10p coins with 26 different designs was put in circulation "celebrating Great Britain with The Royal Mint's Quintessentially British A to Z series of coins".

=== Non-circulating denominations ===
Coins are sometimes issued as special collectible commemorative versions, sold at a value higher than their face value. They are usually legal tender, but worth only their face value to pay debts. For example, in 2023 a 50 pence piece was announced, the first coin depicting King Charles III, and celebrating the fictional wizard Harry Potter. The standard version sells for £11 and a colour version for £20. Other versions range up to a gold coin of £200 face value, selling for £5,215.

The following are special-issue commemorative coins, seldom encountered in normal circulation due to their precious metal content or collectible value, but are still considered legal tender.

- Six pence (6p; £0.06), 2016–present
- Twenty-five pence or crown (25p; £0.25), 1972–1981
- Five pounds or crown (£5), 1990–present
- Twenty pounds (£20), 2013–present
- Fifty pounds (£50), 2015–2016
- One hundred pounds (£100), 2015–2016

Denomination	Obverse	Reverse	Diameter	Thickness	Mass	Composition	Edge	Introduced
6 pence	Queen Elizabeth II	Crowned Royal cypher	19.41 mm	Unknown	3.35 g	Silver	Milled	2016
6 pence	King Charles III	Crowned Royal cypher	19.41 mm	Unknown	3.35 g	Silver	Milled	2023
6 pence	King Charles III	Central Tudor Crown with flowers around	19.41 mm	Unknown	3.35 g	Silver	Milled	2024
25 pence	Queen Elizabeth II	No standard reverse design	38.61 mm	2.89 mm	28.28 g	Cupronickel or silver	Milled, with variable inscription	1972
5 pounds	Queen Elizabeth II	No standard reverse design	38.61 mm	2.89 mm	28.28 g	Cupronickel or silver	Milled, with variable inscription	1990
5 pounds	King Charles III	No standard reverse design	38.61 mm	2.89 mm	28.28 g	Cupronickel or silver	Milled, with variable inscription	2022
20 pounds	Queen Elizabeth II	No standard reverse design	27.0 mm	Unknown	15.71 g	Silver	Milled	2013
50 pounds	Queen Elizabeth II	Britannia	34.0 mm	Unknown	31 g	Silver	Milled	2015
100 pounds	Queen Elizabeth II	Elizabeth Tower 'Big Ben'	40.0 mm	Unknown	62.86 g	Silver	Milled	2015

=== Legal tender status of commemorative coins ===
The prolific issuance since 2013 of silver commemorative £20, £50 and £100 coins at face value has led to attempts to spend or deposit these coins, prompting the Royal Mint to clarify the legal tender status of these silver coins as well as the cupronickel £5 coin. Legal tender has a very narrow legal meaning, related to paying into a court to satisfy a debt, and nobody is obliged to accept any particular form of payment (whether legal tender or not), including commemorative coins. Royal Mint guidelines advise that, although these coins were approved as legal tender, they are considered limited edition collectables not intended for general circulation.

=== Maundy money ===
Maundy money is a ceremonial coinage traditionally given to the poor, and nowadays awarded annually to deserving senior citizens. There are Maundy coins in denominations of one, two, three and four pence. They bear dates from 1822 to the present and are minted in very small quantities. Though they are legal tender in the UK, they are rarely or never encountered in circulation. The pre-decimal Maundy pieces have the same legal tender status and value as post-decimal ones, and effectively increased in face value by 140% upon decimalisation. Their numismatic value is much greater.

=== Bullion coinage ===
The traditional bullion coin issued by Britain is the gold sovereign, formerly a circulating coin worth 20 shillings (or one pound) and with 0.23542 troy ounces (7.322 g) of fine gold, but now with a nominal value of one pound. The Royal Mint continues to produce sovereigns, as well as quarter sovereigns (introduced in 2009), half sovereigns, double sovereigns and quintuple sovereigns.

Between 1987 and 2012 a series of bullion coins, the Britannia, was issued, containing 1 troy ounce (31.1 g), 1/2 ounce, 1/4 ounce and 1/10 ounce of fine gold at a millesimal fineness of 916 (22 carat) and with face values of £100, £50, £25, and £10.

Since 2013 Britannia bullion contains 1 troy ounce of fine gold at a millesimal fineness of 999 (24 carat).

Between 1997 and 2012 silver bullion coins have also been produced under the name "Britannias". The alloy used was Britannia silver (millesimal fineness 958). The silver coins were available in 1 troy ounce (31.1 g), 1/2 ounce, 1/4 ounce and 1/10 ounce sizes. Since 2013 the alloy used is silver at a (millesimal fineness 999).

In 2016 the Royal Mint launched a series of 10 Queen's Beasts bullion coins, one for each beast available in both gold and silver.

The Royal Mint also issues silver, gold and platinum proof sets of the circulating coins, as well as gift products such as gold coins set into jewellery.

== Non-UK coinage ==
The British Islands (red) and overseas territories (blue) using the Pound or their local issue

Outside the United Kingdom, the British Crown Dependencies of Jersey and Guernsey use the pound sterling as their currencies. However, they produce local issues of coinage in the same denominations and specifications, but with different designs. These circulate freely alongside UK coinage and English, Northern Irish, and Scottish banknotes within these territories, but must be converted in order to be used in the UK. The island of Alderney also produces occasional commemorative coins. (See coins of the Jersey pound, coins of the Guernsey pound, and Alderney pound for details.). The Isle of Man is a unique case among the Crown Dependencies, issuing its own currency, the Manx pound. While the Isle of Man recognises the Pound Sterling as a secondary currency, coins of the Manx pound are not legal tender in the UK.

The pound sterling is also the official currency of the British overseas territories of South Georgia and the South Sandwich Islands, British Antarctic Territory and Tristan da Cunha. South Georgia and the South Sandwich Islands produces occasional special collectors' sets of coins. In 2008, British Antarctic Territory issued a £2 coin commemorating the centenary of Britain's claim to the region.

The currencies of the British overseas territories of Gibraltar, the Falkland Islands and Saint Helena/Ascension — namely the Gibraltar pound, Falkland Islands pound and Saint Helena pound — are pegged one-to-one to the pound sterling but are technically separate currencies. These territories issue their own coinage, again with the same denominations and specifications as the UK coinage but with local designs, as coins of the Gibraltar pound, coins of the Falkland Islands pound and coins of the Saint Helena pound.

The other British overseas territories do not use sterling as their official currency.

== Pre-decimal coinage ==
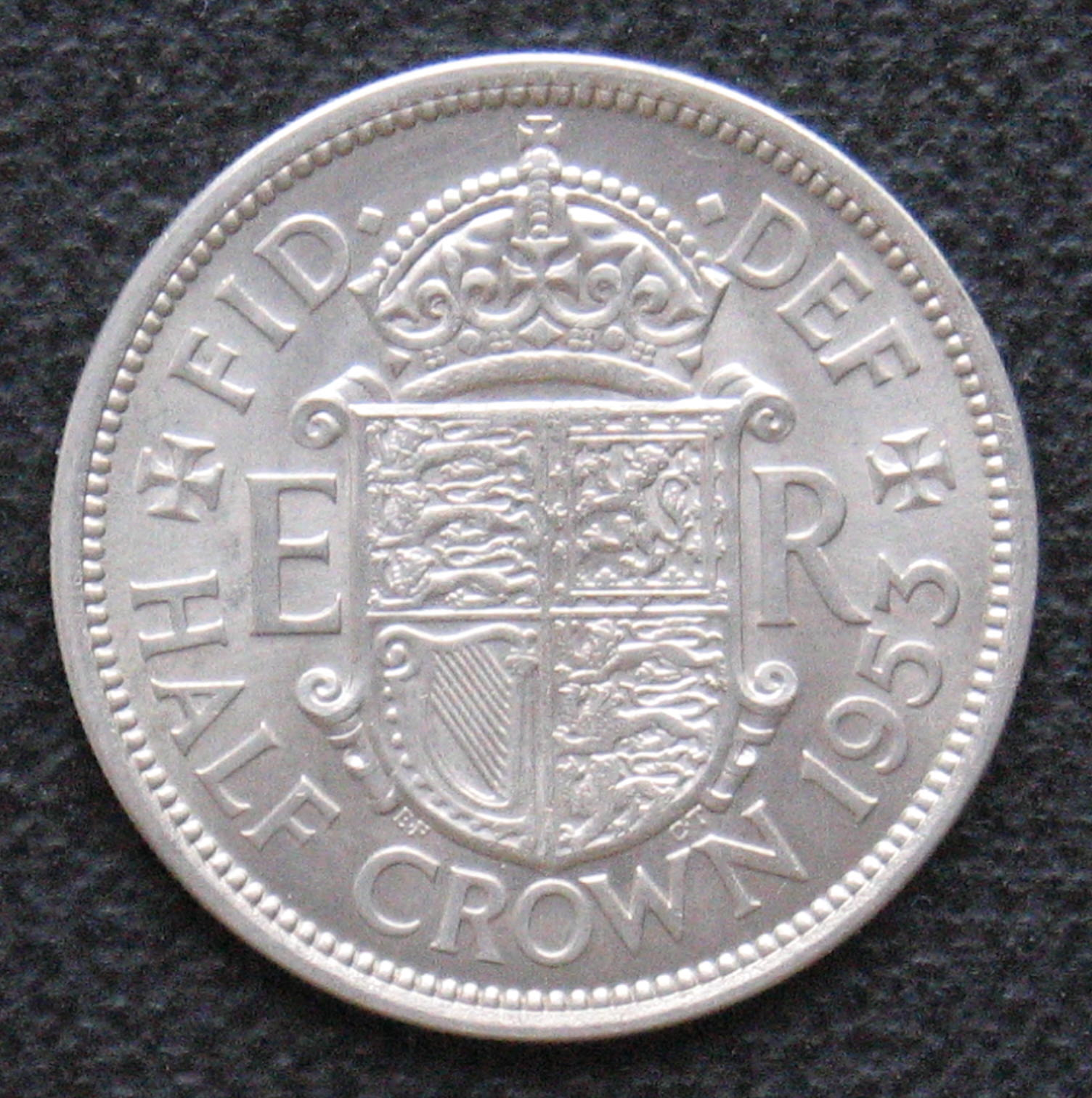
Half crown, 1953

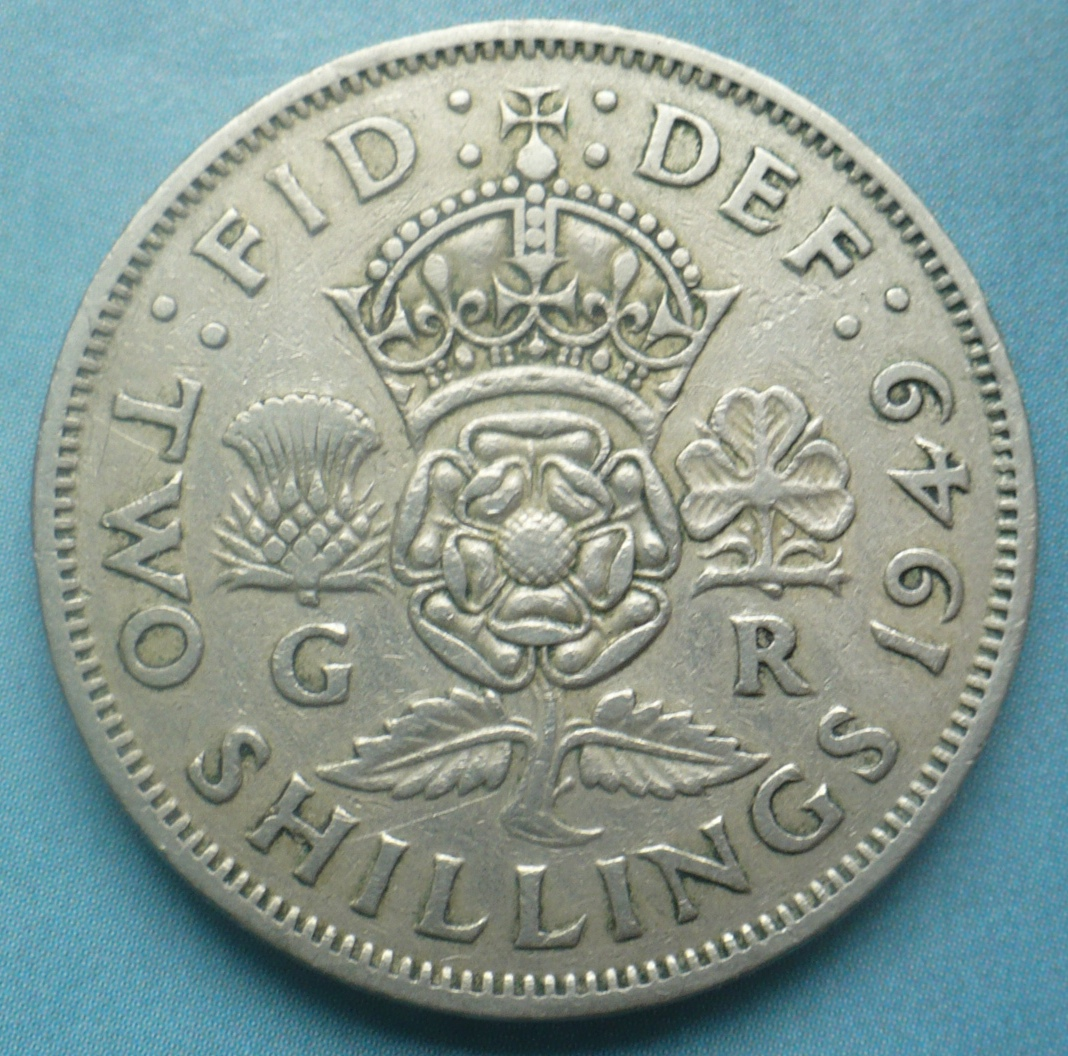
Two shilling coin, or florin, 1949

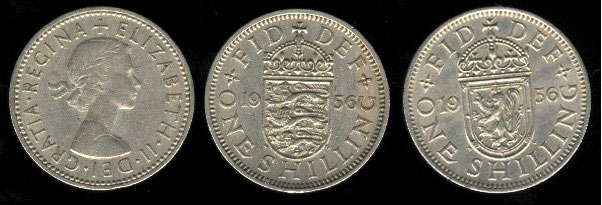
Shilling, 1956, showing English and Scottish reverses

=== System ===
Before decimalisation in 1971, the pound was divided into 240 pence rather than 100, though it was rarely expressed in this way. Rather it was expressed in terms of pounds, shillings and pence, where:

- £1 = 20 shillings (20s).
- 1 shilling = 12 pence (12d).

Thus: £1 = 240d. The penny was further subdivided at various times, though these divisions vanished as inflation made them irrelevant:

- 1 penny = 2 halfpennies and (earlier) 4 farthings (half farthing, a third of a farthing, and quarter farthing coins were minted in the late 19th century, and into the early 20th century in the case of the third farthing, but circulated only in certain British colonies and not in the UK).

Using the example of five shillings and sixpence, the standard ways of writing shillings and pence were:

- 5s 6d
- 5/6
- 5/- for 5 shillings only, with the dash to stand for zero pennies.

The sum of 5/6 would be spoken as "five shillings and sixpence" or "five and six".

The abbreviation for the old penny, d, was derived from the Roman denarius, and the abbreviation for the shilling, s, from the Roman solidus. The shilling was also denoted by the slash symbol, also called a solidus for this reason, which was originally an adaptation of the long s. The symbol "£", for the pound, is derived from the first letter of the Latin word for pound, libra.

A similar pre-decimal system operated in France, also based on the Roman currency, consisting of the livre (L), sol or sou (s) and denier (d). Until 1816 another similar system was used in the Netherlands, consisting of the gulden (G), stuiver (s; 1/20 G) and duit, (d; 1/8 s or 1/160 G).

=== Materials ===
The metal composition varied, not just between different denominations but also over time. The crown, half crown, florin, shilling, and sixpence were made from sterling silver (925 fine) until 1920; debased silver (500 fine) from 1920 until 1946; and cupronickel from 1947 onwards.

The penny, halfpenny, and farthing were made from copper until 1860, after which bronze was used. The bronze alloy initially consisted of 95% copper, 4% tin and 1% zinc, but in 1923 was altered to 95.5% copper, 3% tin and 1.5% zinc.

The threepence introduced in 1937 was a twelve-sided nickel-brass coin, but the previous threepence, a small silver coin of diameter 16 mm (0.630 in) continued to be made until 1945. Like the higher value silver coins, this was changed from sterling silver to debased silver in 1920.

=== Denominations ===
In the years just prior to decimalisation, the circulating British coins were:

Denomination	Obverse	Reverse	Diameter	Thickness	Mass	Composition	Edge	Introduced	Withdrawn
Farthing (1/4d)	Various Monarchs	Wren (Britannia on early mintages)	20.19 mm		2.83 g	Bronze	Smooth	1860	1961
Half penny (1/2d)	Various Monarchs	Golden Hind (Britannia on early mintages)	25.48 mm		5.67 g	Bronze	Smooth	1860	1969
Penny (1d)	Various Monarchs	Britannia	31 mm		9.45 g	Bronze	Smooth	1860	1971
Threepence (3d)	King George VI 1937–1952; Queen Elizabeth II 1953–1971	Thrift until 1952 Crowned portcullis with chains	21.0–21.8 mm	2.5 mm	6.8 g	Nickel-brass	Plain (12-sided)	1937	1971
Sixpence (6d)	King George VI 1946–1952; Queen Elizabeth II 1953–1971	Crowned royal cypher until 1952 Floral design – Four Home Nations	19.41 mm		2.83 g	Cupronickel	Milled	1947	1980
Shilling (1/-)	King George VI 1946–1952; Queen Elizabeth II 1953–1971	Crowned lion on Tudor crown or Crowned lion standing on Scottish crown until 1952 Coat of Arms of England or Scotland	23.60 mm	1.7 mm	5.66 g	Cupronickel	Milled	1947	1990
Florin (2/-)	King George VI 1946–1952; Queen Elizabeth II 1953–1971	Crowned rose flanked by a thistle and shamrock until 1952 Rose encircled by thistle, leek and shamrock	28.5 mm	1.85 mm	11.31 g	Cupronickel	Milled	1947	1992
Half crown (2/6)	King George VI 1946–1952; Queen Elizabeth II 1953–1971	Royal Shield flanked by crowned royal cypher until 1952 Crowned Royal Shield	32.31 mm		14.14 g	Cupronickel	Milled	1947	1969
Crown (5/-)	King George VI 1946–1952; Queen Elizabeth II 1953–1971	Various commemorative designs	38 mm	2.89 mm	28.28 g	Cupronickel	Milled	1951	Present

The farthing (1/4d) had been demonetised on 1 January 1961, whilst the crown (5/-) was issued periodically as a commemorative coin but rarely found in circulation.

Some of the pre-decimalisation coins with exact decimal equivalent values continued in use after 1971 alongside the new coins, albeit with new names (the shilling became equivalent to the 5p coin, with the florin equating to 10p), and the others were withdrawn almost immediately. The use of florins and shillings as legal tender in this way ended in 1991 and 1993 when the 5p and 10p coins were replaced with smaller versions. Indeed, while pre-decimalisation shillings were used as 5p coins, for a while after decimalisation many people continued to call the new 5p coin a shilling, since it remained 1/20 of a pound, but was now counted as 5p (five new pence) instead of 12d (twelve old pennies). The pre-decimalisation sixpence, also known as a sixpenny bit or sixpenny piece, was equivalent to 2 1/2p, but was demonetised in 1980.

Pre-decimal coins of the pound sterling
	Five pounds	Double sovereign	Sovereign	Crown	Half crown	Florin	Shilling	Sixpence	Groat	Threepence	Penny	Halfpenny	Farthing	Half farthing	Third farthing	Quarter farthing
Five pounds	1	2 1/2	5	20	40	50	100	200	300	400	1200	2400	4800	9600	14400	19200
Double sovereign	2/5	1	2	8	16	20	40	80	120	160	480	960	1920	3840	5760	7680
Sovereign	1/5	1/2	1	4	8	10	20	40	60	80	240	480	960	1920	2880	3840
Crown	1/20	1/8	1/4	1	2	2 1/2	5	10	15	20	60	120	240	480	720	960
Half crown	1/40	1/16	1/8	1/2	1	1 1/4	2 1/2	5	7 1/2	10	30	60	120	240	360	480
Florin	1/50	1/20	1/10	2/5	4/5	1	2	4	6	8	24	48	96	192	288	384
Shilling	1/100	1/40	1/20	1/5	2/5	1/2	1	2	3	4	12	24	48	96	144	192
Sixpence	1/200	1/80	1/40	1/10	1/5	1/4	1/2	1	1 1/2	2	6	12	24	48	72	96
Groat	1/300	1/120	1/60	1/15	2/15	1/6	1/3	2/3	1	1 1/3	4	8	16	32	48	64
Threepence	1/400	1/160	1/80	1/20	1/10	1/8	1/4	1/2	3/4	1	3	6	12	24	36	48
Penny	1/1200	1/480	1/240	1/60	1/30	1/24	1/12	1/6	1/4	1/3	1	2	4	8	12	16
Halfpenny	1/2400	1/960	1/480	1/120	1/60	1/48	1/24	1/12	1/8	1/6	1/2	1	2	4	6	8
Farthing	1/4800	1/1920	1/960	1/240	1/120	1/96	1/48	1/24	1/16	1/12	1/4	1/2	1	2	3	4
Half farthing	1/9600	1/3840	1/1920	1/480	1/240	1/192	1/96	1/48	1/36	1/24	1/8	1/4	1/2	1	1 1/2	2
Third farthing	1/14400	1/5760	1/2880	1/720	1/360	1/288	1/144	1/72	1/48	1/36	1/12	1/6	1/3	2/3	1	1 1/3
Quarter farthing	1/19200	1/7680	1/3840	1/960	1/480	1/384	1/192	1/96	1/72	1/48	1/16	1/8	1/4	1/2	3/4	1

Visualisation of some British currency terms before decimalisation

=== Slang and everyday usage ===
Some pre-decimalisation coins or denominations became commonly known by colloquial and slang terms, perhaps the most well known being bob for a shilling, and quid for a pound. A farthing was a mag, a silver threepence was a joey and the later nickel-brass threepence was called a threepenny bit (/ˈθrʌpni/ or /ˈθrɛpni/ bit, i.e. thrup'ny or threp'ny bit – the apostrophe was pronounced on a scale from full "e" down to complete omission); a sixpence was a tanner, the two-shilling coin or florin was a two-bob bit. Bob is still used in phrases such as "earn/worth a bob or two", and "bob‐a‐job week". A rhyme, with several variations and sung to the tune of 'Rule Britannia', was: "Rule Britannia, two tanners make a bob, three make eighteen pence, and four two bob".

The two shillings and sixpence coin or half-crown was a half-dollar, also sometimes referred to as two and a kick. A value of two pence was universally pronounced /ˈtʌpəns/ tuppence, a usage which is still heard today, especially among older people. The unaccented suffix "-pence", pronounced /pəns/, was similarly appended to the other numbers up to twelve; thus "fourpence", "sixpence-three-farthings", "twelvepence-ha'penny", but "eighteen pence" would usually be said "one-and-six".

Quid remains as popular slang for one or more pounds to this day in Britain in the form "a quid" and then "two quid", and so on. Similarly, in some parts of the country, bob continued to represent one-twentieth of a pound, that is five new pence, and two bob is 10p.

The introduction of decimal currency caused a new casual usage to emerge, where any value in pence is spoken using the suffix pee: e.g. "twenty-three pee" or, in the early years, "two-and-a-half pee" rather than the previous "tuppence-ha'penny". Amounts over a pound are normally spoken thus: "five pounds forty". A value with less than ten pence over the pound is sometimes spoken like this: "one pound and a penny", "three pounds and fourpence". The slang term "bit" has almost disappeared from use completely, although in Scotland a fifty pence is sometimes referred to as a "ten bob bit". Decimal denomination coins are generally described using the terms piece or coin, for example, "a fifty-pee piece", a "ten-pence coin".

=== Monarch's profile ===
All coins since the late 17th century have featured a profile of the current monarch's head. The direction in which they face changes with each successive monarch, a pattern that began with the Stuarts, as shown in the table below:

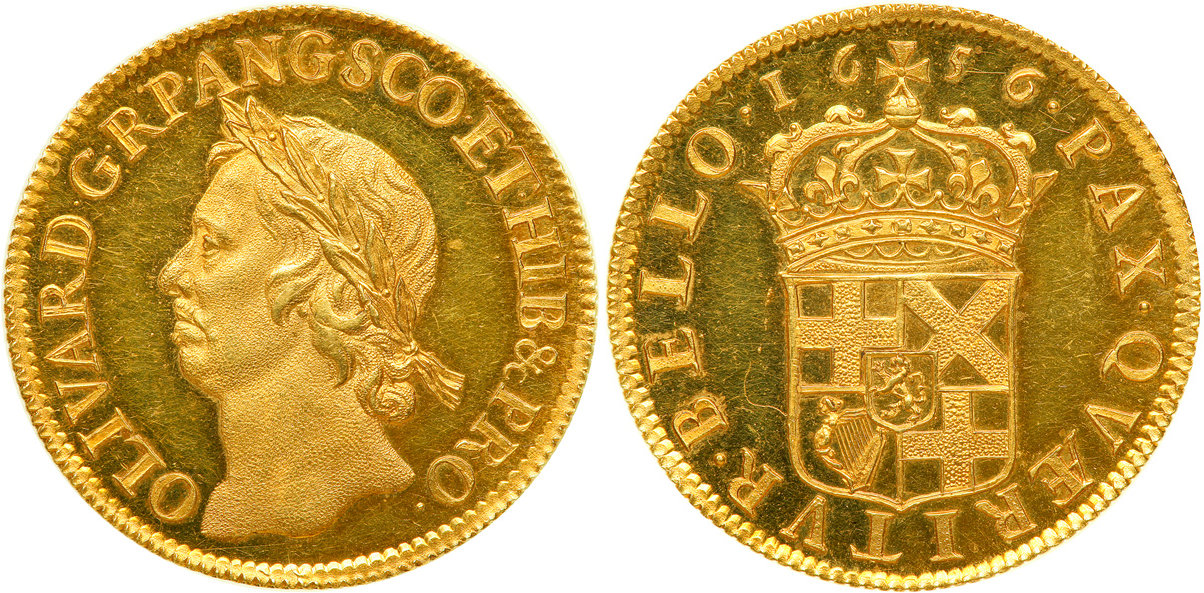
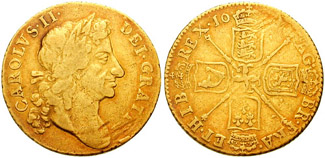
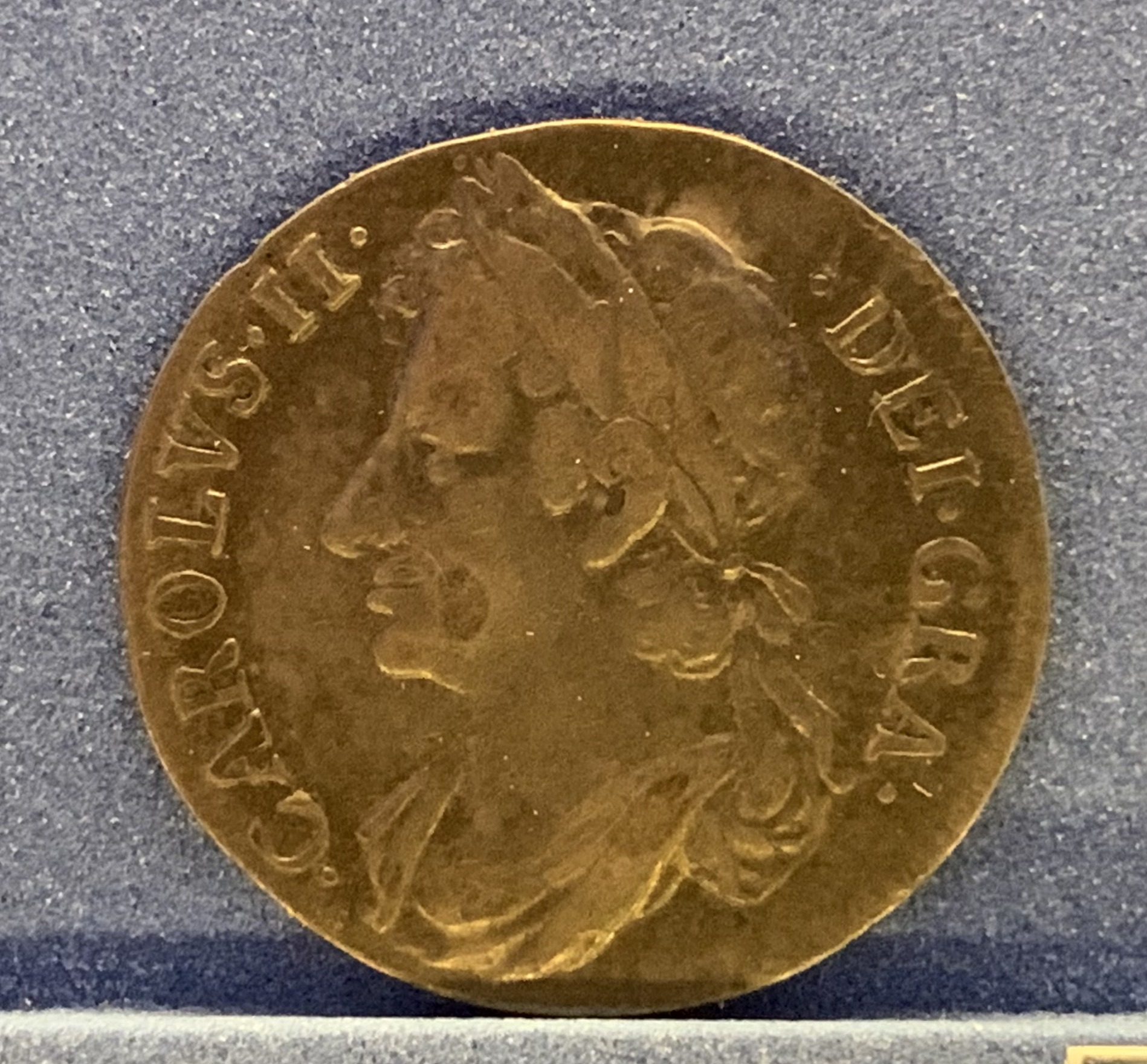
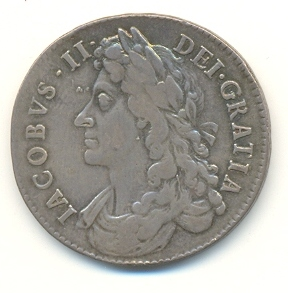
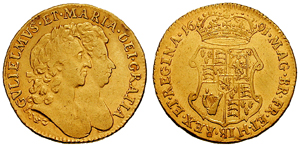
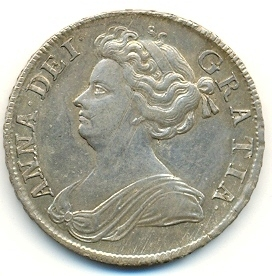
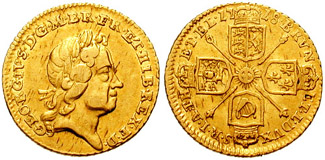
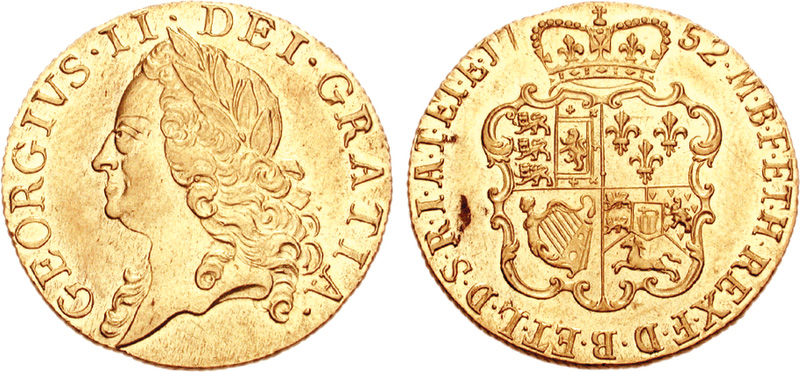
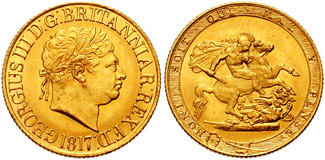
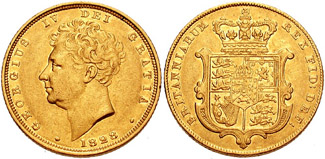
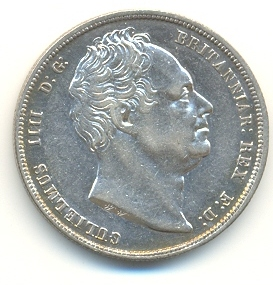
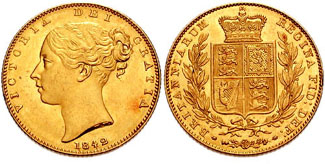
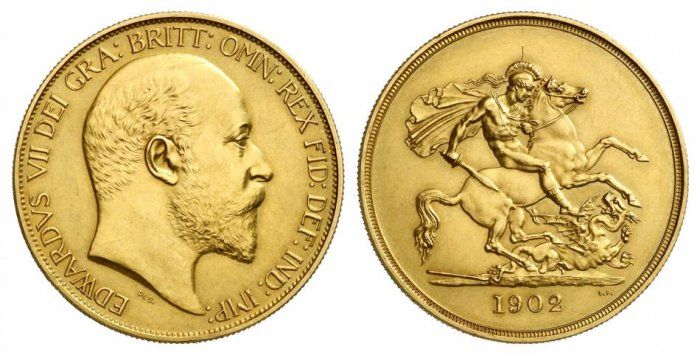
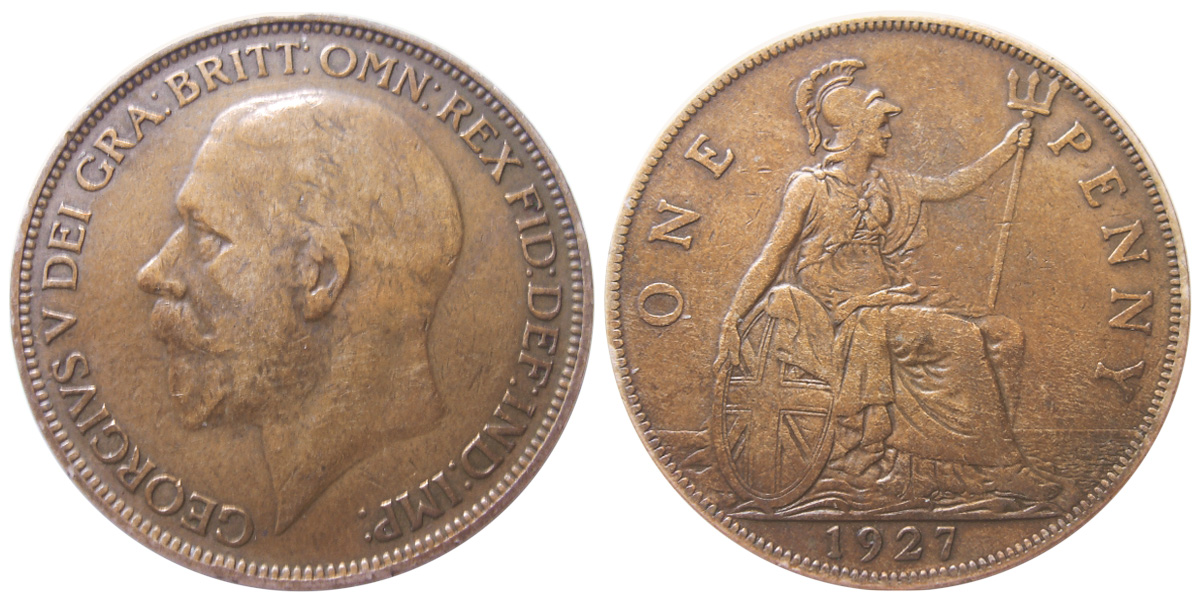
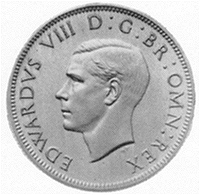
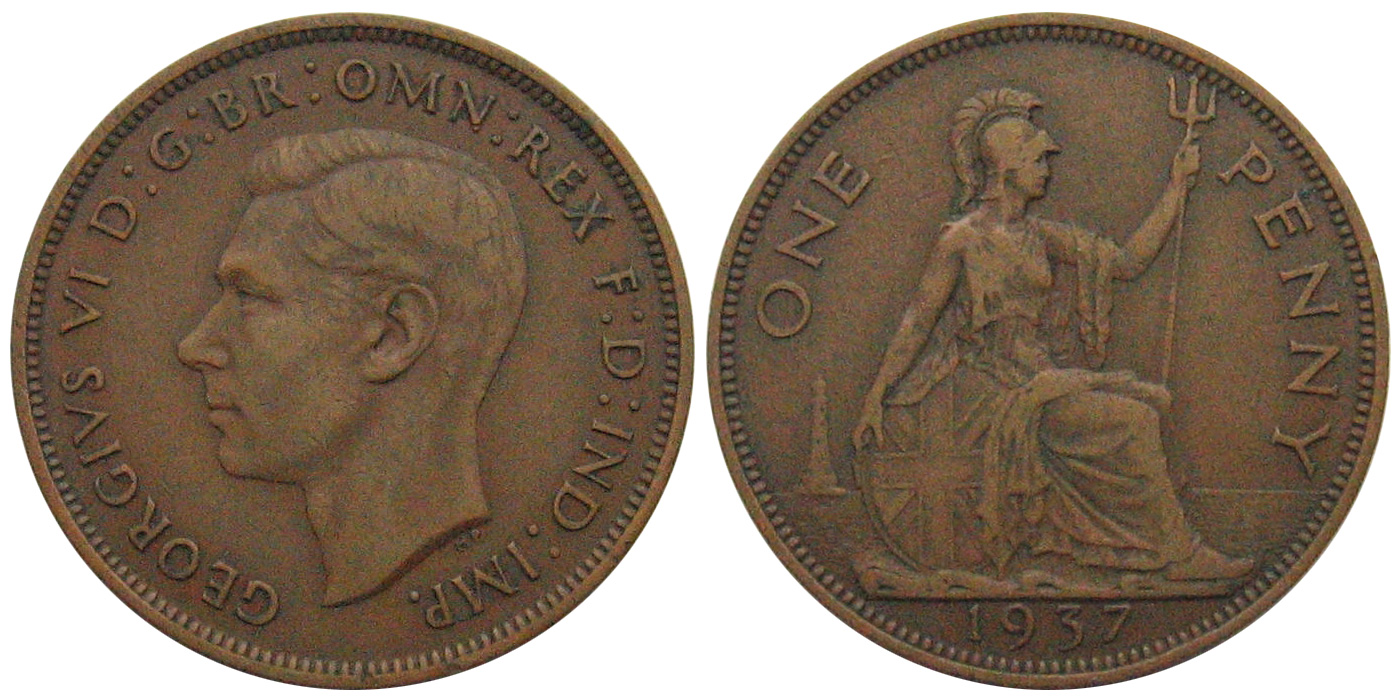
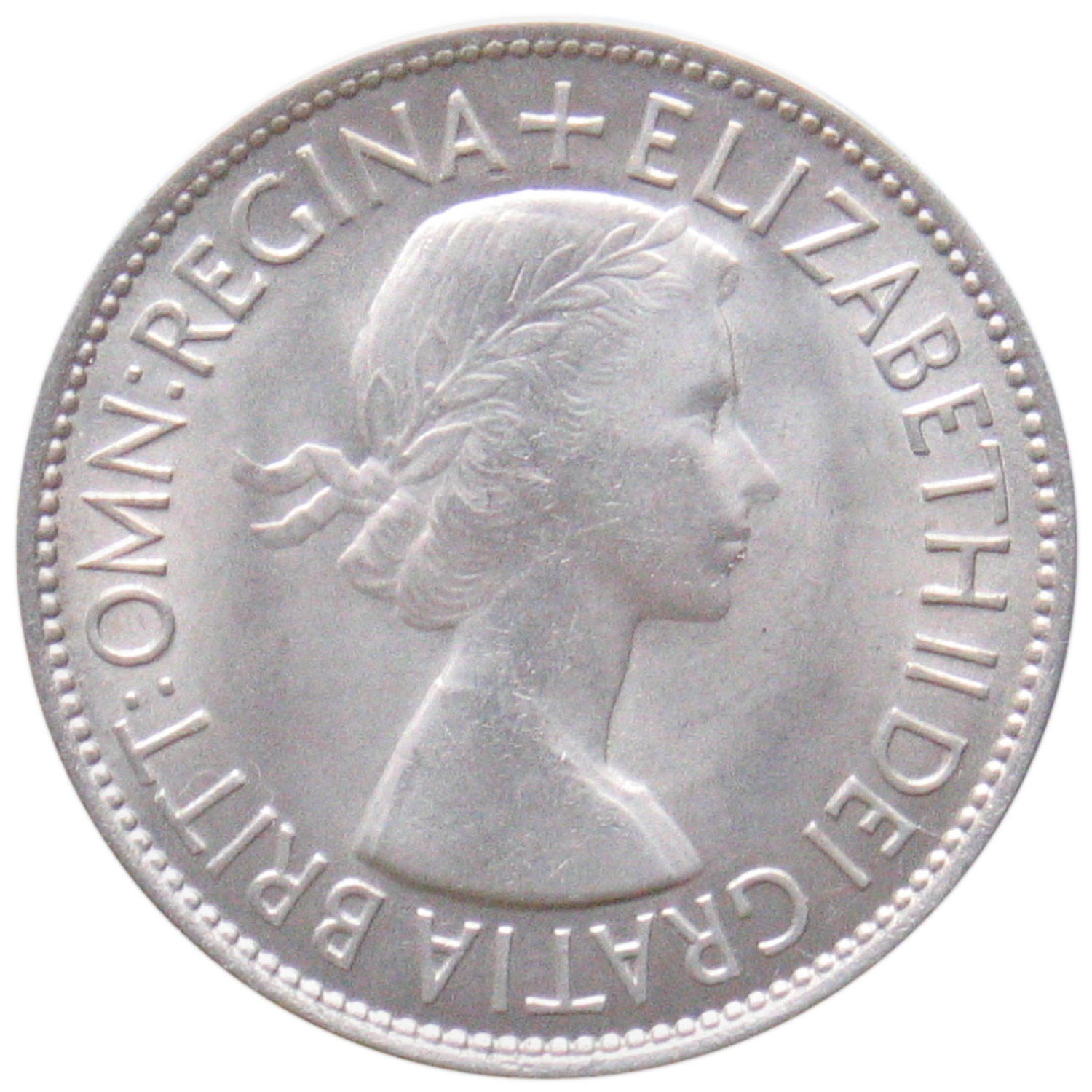
Facing left	Facing right
Cromwell 1653–1658	Charles II 1660–1685
James II 1685–1688	William and Mary 1689–1694; William III 1694–1702
Anne 1702–1714	George I 1714–1727
George II 1727–1760	George III 1760–1820
George IV 1820–1830	William IV 1830–1837
Victoria 1837–1901	Edward VII 1901–1910
George V 1910–1936
Edward VIII 1936	(uncirculated issues)
George VI 1936–1952	Elizabeth II 1952–2022
Charles III 2022–present

For the Tudors and the Stuarts up to and including Charles II, both left- and right-facing portrait images were minted within the reign of a single monarch (left-facing images were more common), together with equestrian portraits on certain coins and (earlier) full face portrait images. In the Middle Ages, portrait images tended to be full face.

There was a small quirk in this alternating pattern when Edward VIII became king in January 1936 and was portrayed facing left, the same as his predecessor George V. This was because Edward thought his left side to be better than his right. However, Edward VIII abdicated in December 1936 and his coins were never put into general circulation. When George VI came to the throne, he had his coins struck with him facing the left, as if Edward VIII's coins had faced right (as they should have done according to tradition). Thus, in a timeline of circulating British coins, George V and VI's coins both feature left-facing portraits, although they follow directly chronologically.

=== Regal titles ===
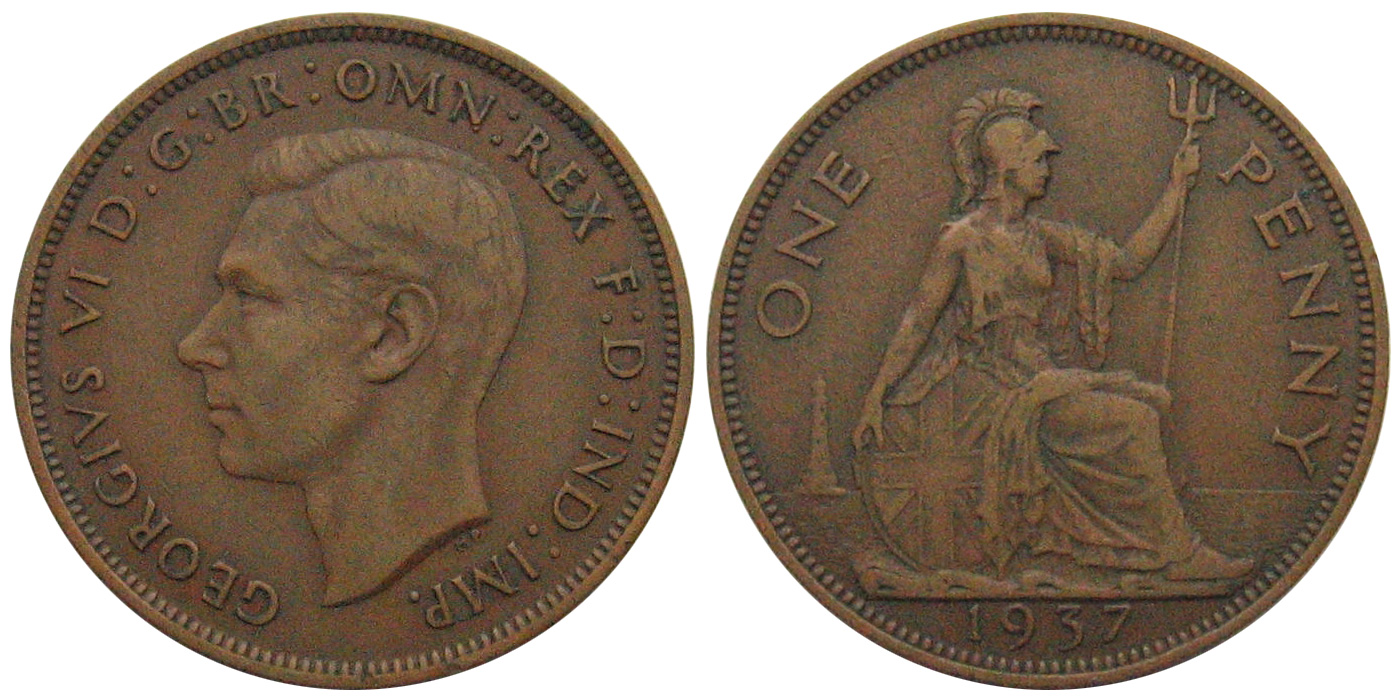
A 1937 George VI penny

From a very early date, British coins have been inscribed with the name of the ruler of the kingdom in which they were produced, and a longer or shorter title, always in Latin; among the earliest distinctive English coins are the silver pennies of Offa of Mercia, which were inscribed with the legend OFFA REX "King Offa". As the legends became longer, words in the inscriptions were often abbreviated so that they could fit on the coin; identical legends have often been abbreviated in different ways depending upon the size and decoration of the coin. Inscriptions which go around the edge of the coin generally have started at the centre of the top edge and proceeded in a clockwise direction. A very lengthy legend would be continued on the reverse side of the coin. All monarchs used Latinised names, save Edward III and Edward VI, both Elizabeths, and Charles III (which would have been EDWARDUS, ELIZABETHA, and CAROLUS respectively).

Examples of coinage legends
Latin text	English text	Notes
EDWARD DEI GRA REX ANGL Z FRANC D HYB(E)	Edward III, by the grace of God King of England and France, Lord of Ireland	
EDWARD DEI GRA REX ANGL DNS HYB Z ACQ	Edward, by the grace of God King of England, Lord of Ireland and Aquitaine	Used after the Treaty of Brétigny (1360) when Edward III temporarily gave up his claim to the French throne.
EDWARD DEI G REX ANG Z FRA DNS HYB Z ACT	Edward, by the grace of God King of England and France, Lord of Ireland and Aquitaine	Used after Anglo-French relations broke down and Edward III resumed his claim.
HENRICUS VII DEI GRATIA REX ANGLIÆ & FRANCIÆ	Henry VII by the Grace of God, King of England and France	France had been claimed by the English continuously since 1369.
HENRICUS VIII DEI GRATIA REX ANGLIÆ & FRANCIÆ	Henry VIII by the Grace of God, King of England and France	The Arabic numeral 8 was also used instead of the Roman VIII.
HENRICUS VIII DEI GRATIA ANGLIÆ FRANCIÆ & HIBERNIÆ REX	Henry VIII by the Grace of God, Of England, France and Ireland, King	Used after Henry VIII made Ireland a kingdom in 1541. The Arabic numeral 8 was also used instead of the Roman VIII.
PHILIPPUS ET MARIA DEI GRATIA REX & REGINA	Philip and Mary by the Grace of God, King and Queen	The names of the realms were omitted from the coin for reasons of space.
ELIZABETH DEI GRATIA ANGLIÆ FRANCIÆ ET HIBERNIÆ REGINA	Elizabeth, by the Grace of God, of England, France, and Ireland, Queen	
IACOBUS DEI GRATIA MAGNÆ BRITANNIÆ FRANCIÆ ET HIBERNIÆ REX	James, by the Grace of God, of Great Britain, France, and Ireland, King	James, King of Scotland, by succeeding to the English throne united the two kingdoms in his person; he dubbed the combination of the two kingdoms "Great Britain" (the name of the whole island) though they remained legislatively distinct for more than a century afterwards.
CAROLUS DEI GRATIA MAGNÆ BRITANNIÆ FRANCIÆ ET HIBERNIÆ REX	Charles, by the Grace of God, of Great Britain, France, and Ireland, King	
OLIVARIUS DEI GRATIA REIPUBLICÆ ANGLIÆ SCOTIÆ HIBERNIÆ & CETERORUM PROTECTOR	Oliver, by the Grace of God, of the Commonwealth of England, Scotland, Ireland etc., Protector	Cromwell ruled as a monarch but did not claim the title of king.
CAROLUS II DEI GRATIA MAGNÆ BRITANNIÆ FRANCIÆ ET HIBERNIÆ REX	Charles II, by the Grace of God, of Great Britain, France, and Ireland, King	
IACOBUS II DEI GRATIA MAGNÆ BRITANNIÆ FRANCIÆ ET HIBERNIÆ REX	James II, by the Grace of God, of Great Britain, France, and Ireland, King	
GULIELMUS ET MARIA DEI GRATIA MAGNÆ BRITANNIÆ FRANCIÆ ET HIBERNIÆ REX ET REGINA	William and Mary by the Grace of God, of Great Britain, France, and Ireland, King and Queen	The spouses William and Mary ruled jointly.
GULIELMUS III DEI GRATIA MAGNÆ BRITANNIÆ FRANCIÆ ET HIBERNIÆ REX	William III by the Grace of God, of Great Britain, France, and Ireland, King	William continued to rule alone after his wife's death.
ANNA DEI GRATIA MAGNÆ BRITANNIÆ FRANCIÆ ET HIBERNIÆ REGINA	Anne by the Grace of God, of Great Britain, France, and Ireland, Queen	
GEORGIUS DEI GRATIA MAGNÆ BRITANNIÆ FRANCIÆ ET HIBERNIÆ REX FIDEI DEFENSOR BRUNSVICENSIS ET LUNEBURGENSIS DUX SACRI ROMANI IMPERII ARCHITHESAURARIUS ET ELECTOR	George by the Grace of God, of Great Britain, France, and Ireland King, Defender of the Faith, of Brunswick and Lüneburg Duke, of the Holy Roman Empire Archtreasurer and Elector	George I added the titles he already possessed as Elector of Hanover. He also added the title "Defender of the Faith", which had been borne by the English kings since Henry VIII, but which had previously only rarely appeared on coins.
GEORGIUS II DEI GRATIA MAGNÆ BRITANNIÆ FRANCIÆ ET HIBERNIÆ REX FIDEI DEFENSOR BRUNSVICENSIS ET LUNEBURGENSIS DUX SACRI ROMANI IMPERII ARCHITHESAURARIUS ET ELECTOR	George II by the Grace of God, of Great Britain, France, and Ireland King, Defender of the Faith, of Brunswick and Lüneburg Duke, of the Holy Roman Empire Archtreasurer and Elector	
GEORGIUS III DEI GRATIA MAGNÆ BRITANNIÆ FRANCIÆ ET HIBERNIÆ REX FIDEI DEFENSOR BRUNSVICENSIS ET LUNEBURGENSIS DUX SACRI ROMANI IMPERII ARCHITHESAURARIUS ET ELECTOR	George III by the Grace of God, of Great Britain, France, and Ireland King, Defender of the Faith, of Brunswick and Lüneburg Duke, of the Holy Roman Empire Archtreasurer and Elector	
GEORGIUS III DEI GRATIA BRITANNIARUM REX FIDEI DEFENSOR	George III, by the Grace of God, of the Britains King, Defender of the Faith	The Acts of Union united Great Britain and Ireland into a single kingdom, represented on the coinage by the Latin genitive plural Britanniarum ("of the Britains", often abbreviated BRITT). At the same time, the claim to the throne of France was dropped and other titles were omitted from the coinage.
GEORGIUS IIII DEI GRATIA BRITANNIARUM REX FIDEI DEFENSOR	George IV, by the Grace of God, of the Britains King, Defender of the Faith	Used 1820-1826.
GEORGIUS IV DEI GRATIA BRITANNIARUM REX FIDEI DEFENSOR	George IV, by the Grace of God, of the Britains King, Defender of the Faith	Used 1824-1830.
GULIELMUS IIII DEI GRATIA BRITANNIARUM REX FIDEI DEFENSOR	William IV, by the Grace of God, of the Britains King, Defender of the Faith	
VICTORIA DEI GRATIA BRITANNIARUM REGINA FIDEI DEFENSOR	Victoria, by the Grace of God, of the Britains Queen, Defender of the Faith	
VICTORIA DEI GRATIA BRITANNIARUM REGINA FIDEI DEFENSOR INDIÆ IMPERATRIX	Victoria, by the Grace of God, of the Britains Queen, Defender of the Faith, Empress of India	Queen Victoria was granted the title "Empress of India" in 1876.
EDWARDUS VII DEI GRATIA BRITANNIARUM OMNIUM REX FIDEI DEFENSOR INDIÆ IMPERATOR	Edward VII, by the Grace of God, of all the Britains King, Defender of the Faith, Emperor of India	Edward VII's coins added OMNIUM ("all") after "Britains" to imply a rule over the British overseas colonies as well as the United Kingdoms of England, Scotland, and Ireland.
GEORGIUS V DEI GRATIA BRITANNIARUM OMNIUM REX FIDEI DEFENSOR INDIÆ IMPERATOR	George V, by the Grace of God, of all the Britains King, Defender of the Faith, Emperor of India	
EDWARDUS VIII DEI GRATIA BRITANNIARUM OMNIUM REX FIDEI DEFENSOR INDIÆ IMPERATOR	Edward VIII, by the Grace of God, of all the Britains King, Defender of the Faith, Emperor of India	Although Edward VIII abdicated, his coins never properly entered circulation but it can be assumed his coins had these words.
GEORGIUS VI DEI GRATIA BRITANNIARUM OMNIUM REX FIDEI DEFENSOR INDIÆ IMPERATOR	George VI, by the Grace of God, of all the Britains King, Defender of the Faith, Emperor of India	
GEORGIUS VI DEI GRATIA BRITANNIARUM OMNIUM REX FIDEI DEFENSOR	George VI, by the Grace of God, of all the Britains King, Defender of the Faith	The title "Emperor of India" was relinquished in 1948, after the independence of India and Pakistan.
ELIZABETH II DEI GRATIA BRITANNIARUM OMNIUM REGINA FIDEI DEFENSOR	Elizabeth II, by the Grace of God, of all the Britains Queen, Defender of the Faith	
ELIZABETH II DEI GRATIA REGINA FIDEI DEFENSOR	Elizabeth II, by the Grace of God, Queen, Defender of the Faith	The "of all the Britains" was dropped from the coinage in 1954, and current coins do not name any realm.
CHARLES III DEI GRATIA REX FIDEI DEFENSOR	Charles III, by the Grace of God, King, Defender of the Faith	

=== Coins in the colonies ===
Some coins made for circulation in the British colonies are considered part of British coinage because they have no indication of what country it was minted for and they were made in the same style as contemporary coins circulating in the United Kingdom.

A three halfpence (1 1/2 pence, 1/160 of a pound) coin was circulated mainly in the West Indies and Ceylon in the starting in 1834. Jamaicans referred to the coin as a "quatty".

The half farthing (1/8 of a penny, 1/1920 of a pound) coin was initially minted in 1828 for use in Ceylon, but was declared legal tender in the United Kingdom in 1842.

The third farthing (1/12 of a penny, 1/2880 of a pound) coin was minted for use in Malta, starting in 1827.

The quarter farthing (1/16 of a penny, 1/3840 of a pound) coin was minted for use in Ceylon starting in 1839.

== Mottos ==
In addition to the title, a Latin or French motto might be included, generally on the reverse side of the coin. These varied between denominations and issues; some were personal to the monarch, others were more general. Some of the mottos were:

- POSUI DEUM ADIUTOREM MEUM "I have made God my helper". Coins of Henry VII, Henry VIII, Elizabeth I. Possibly refers to Psalm 52:7, Ecce homo qui non-posuit Deum adjutorem suum "Behold the man who did not make God his helper".
- RUTILANS ROSA SINE SPINA "A dazzling rose without a thorn". Coins of Henry VIII and Edward VI. Initially on the unsuccessful and very rare Crown of the Rose of Henry VIII and continued on subsequent small gold coinage into the reign of Edward VI.
- POSUIMUS DEUM ADIUTOREM NOSTRUM "We have made God our helper". Coins of Philip and Mary. The same as above, but with a plural subject.
- FACIAM EOS IN GENTEM UNAM "I shall make them into one nation". Coins of James I, signifying his desire to unite the English and Scottish nations. Refers to Ezekiel 37:22 in the Vulgate Bible.
- CHRISTO AUSPICE REGNO "I reign with Christ as my protector". Coins of Charles I.
- EXURGAT DEUS DISSIPENTUR INIMICI "May God rise up, may [his] enemies be scattered". Coins of Charles I, during the Civil War. Refers to Psalm 67:1 in the Vulgate Bible (Psalm 68 in English Bible numbering).
- PAX QUÆRITUR BELLO "Peace is sought by war". Coins of the Protectorate; personal motto of Oliver Cromwell.
- BRITANNIA "Britain". Reign of Charles II to George III. Found on pennies and smaller denominations.
- HONI SOIT QUI MAL Y PENSE. "Shamed be he who thinks ill of it." Sovereigns of George III. Motto of the Order of the Garter.
- DECUS ET TUTAMEN. "An ornament and a safeguard." Some pound coins of Elizabeth II and some crown coins including some of Victoria and George V. Refers to the inscribed edge as a protection against the clipping of precious metal, as well as being a complimentary reference to the monarch and the monarchy.

== Minting errors reaching circulation ==
Coins with errors in the minting process that reach circulation are often seen as valuable items by coin collectors.

In 1983, the Royal Mint mistakenly produced some two pence pieces with the old wording "New Pence" on the reverse (tails) side, when the design had been changed from 1982 to "Two Pence".

In 2016, a batch of double-dated £1 coins was released into circulation. These coins had the main date on the obverse as '2016', but micro-engraving on the reverse dated as '2017'. It is not known how many exist and are in circulation, but the amount is fewer than half a million.

In June 2009, the Royal Mint estimated that between 50,000 and 200,000 dateless 20 pence coins had entered circulation, the first undated British coin to enter circulation in more than 300 years. It resulted from the accidental combination of old and new face tooling in a production batch, creating what is known as a mule, following the 2008 redesign which moved the date from the reverse (tails) to the obverse (heads) side.

== See also ==
- Banknotes of the pound sterling
- List of British banknotes and coins
- Mark (money)
- Non-decimal currency
- One hundred pounds (British coin)
- Roman currency
- Twenty pounds (British coin)
