= 5th Infantry =

5th Infantry may refer to:

- 5th Infantry Regiment (disambiguation)
- 5th Infantry Brigade (disambiguation)
- 5th Infantry Division (disambiguation)

== See also ==
- 5th (disambiguation)
