= 2/10 =

2/10 may refer to:

- 1/5, or one fifth
- February 10 (month-day date notation)
- October 2 (day-month date notation)
- 2nd Battalion, 10th Marines, an artillery battalion of the United States Marine Corps

== See also ==
1/5, a disambiguation page
