= Fifth of the month =

Recurring ordinal calendar date

The fifth of the month or fifth day of the month is the recurring calendar date position corresponding to the day numbered 5 of each month. In the Gregorian calendar (and other calendars that number days sequentially within a month), this day occurs in every month of the year, and therefore occurs twelve times per year.

- Fifth of January
- Fifth of February
- Fifth of March
- Fifth of April
- Fifth of May
- Fifth of June
- Fifth of July
- Fifth of August
- Fifth of September
- Fifth of October
- Fifth of November
- Fifth of December

In addition to these dates, this date occurs in months of many other calendars, such as the Bengali calendar and the Hebrew calendar.

== See also ==
- Fifth (disambiguation)
- Fifth of July (disambiguation)
