= Half farthing =

Former coin of the United Kingdom and other territories

One half farthing
- United Kingdom
- Value: £0.00052083̅; 0.125d
- Mass: 2.3 g
- Diameter: 18.0 mm
- Edge: Plain
- Composition: (1828–1856) copper (1868) bronze
- Years of minting: 1828, 1830, 1837, 1839 1842–1844, 1847, 1851–1854, 1856, 1868 (proof only)

Obverse
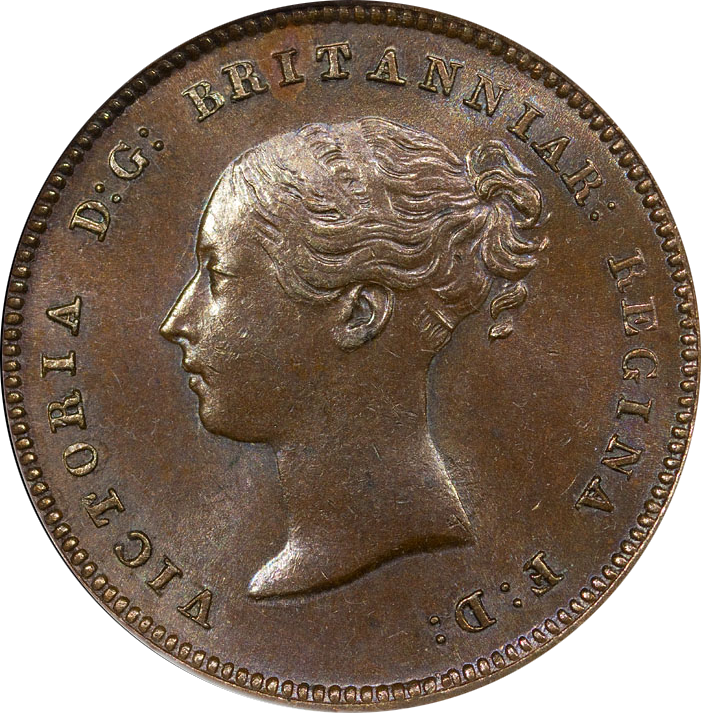
- Design: Profile of the monarch (Victoria design shown)
- Designer: William Wyon
- Design date: 1839

Reverse
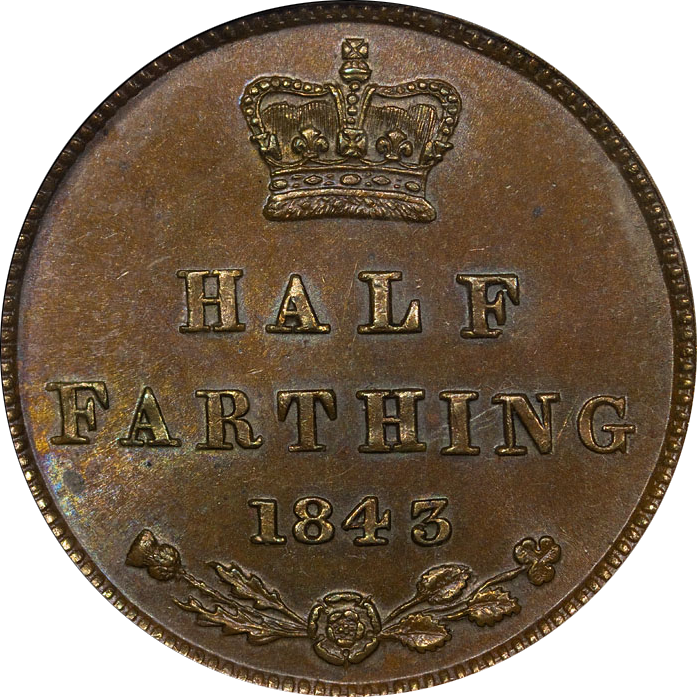
- Design: Various (Crown and rose-thistle-shamrock design shown)
- Design date: 1842

The half farthing was a British coin worth 1/1920 of a pound, 1/96 of a shilling, or 1/8 of a penny. The coins were minted in copper for use in British Ceylon in various years between 1828 and 1856, and as a bronze proof coin in 1868. In 1842, they were also declared legal tender in the United Kingdom. Half farthings were demonetised along with all other British copper coins on 31 December 1869.

== History ==
The Royal Mint first produced half farthings in 1828 for use in British Ceylon, using dies by William Wyon. The obverse of the coin bore a left-facing portrait of George IV, with the legend GEORGIUS IV DEI GRATIA and the date, while the reverse showed a seated Britannia with shield, facing right and holding a trident, with the inscription BRITANNIAR: REX FID: DEF:. (Note: In full, Georgius IV Dei Gratia Britanniarum Rex Fidei Defensor (George IV, By the Grace of God, King of the Britains, Defender of the Faith)) The coins were made of copper, weighed 2.4 grammes, and had a diameter of 18 millimetres. The mint produced a second issue of George IV half farthings in 1830.

The mint produced one issue of half farthings during the reign of William IV in 1837. The obverse bore a right-facing portrait of William IV by Wyon with the legend GULIELMUS IIII DEI GRATIA (Note: In full, Gulielmus IV Dei Gratia Britanniarum Rex Fidei Defensor (William IV, By the Grace of God, King of the Britains, Defender of the Faith)) and the date. The coins used the same reverse dies as the issues of George IV, and were struck with the same size and weight standards.

Wyon redesigned the half farthing for Queen Victoria's first issue in 1839. The obverse used the same dies as Wyon's Maundy fourpence, bearing a left-facing portrait of Queen Victoria and the legend VICTORIA D: G: BRITANNIAR: REGINA F: D:. (Note: In full, Victoria Dei Gratia Britanniarum Regina Fidei Defensor (Victoria, By the Grace of God, Queen of the Britains, Defender of the Faith)) The mint completely redesigned the reverse to avoid any resemblance between half farthings and the fourpence coins introduced in 1836 and issued for Ceylon in 1839. The new reverse featured a royal crown above the words HALF FARTHING and the date. Below the date, the coins featured a heraldic rose with three leaves on either side. This design was extremely similar to the quarter farthing, which had been first minted the same year. The mint produced additional issues in 1842, 1843, 1844, 1847, 1851, 1852, 1853, 1854, and 1856, all to the same size and weight standards as the issues of George IV and William IV, but with the rose emblem changed to a joint rose, thistle, and shamrock. The mint produced proof half farthings in bronze and copper-nickel in 1868, but no 1868 half farthings were issued for circulation.

Half farthings were made legal tender in the United Kingdom on 13 June 1842. Several letters to the editor in The Times criticised the proclamation. All British copper coins, including half farthings, were demonetised and taken out of circulation on 31 December 1869.
