= Fifth =

Fifth is the ordinal form of the number five.

Fifth, 5th, or The Fifth may also refer to:

- Fifth Amendment to the United States Constitution, as in the expression "pleading the Fifth"
- Fifth Avenue
- Fifth column, a political term
- Fifth disease, a contagious rash that spreads in school-aged children
- Fifth force, a proposed force of nature in addition to the four known fundamental forces
- Fifth of July (New York), historic celebration of an Emancipation Day in New York
- Fifth (Stargate), a robotic character in the television series Stargate SG-1
- Fifth (unit), a unit of volume formerly used for distilled beverages in the U.S.
- 1st Battalion, 5th Marines
- The fraction 1/5, one of five equal parts of a whole
- The royal fifth (Spanish and Portuguese), an old royal tax of 20%

== Music ==
- A musical interval; specifically, a
  - perfect fifth
  - diminished fifth
  - augmented fifth
- Quintal harmony, in which chords concatenate fifth intervals (rather than the third intervals of tertian harmony)
- Fifth (chord)
  - A chord (music), member separated from the chord's root by one of the above fifth-intervals
  - The dominant (music) or fifth diatonic scale degree, and the chord built on it
- Musical compositions
  - Symphony No. 5 (Beethoven), commonly referred to as Beethoven's Fifth
  - Fifth (Soft Machine album), 1972
  - The Fifth (Bad Boys Blue album), 1989
  - The Fifth (Dizzee Rascal album), 2013
  - The Fifth (Obie Trice album), 2019
  - 5th (Lee Michaels album), 1971
  - Fifth (The Autumn Defense album), 2014
  - "Fifths", a song by Deadmau5
  - Fifths (or Kvintit), a piece from Rautavaara's Études
- The Fifth (band), a hard rock band from Fayetteville, North Carolina

== Places ==
- 5th meridian east, a line of longitude extending through Europe and Africa
- 5th meridian west, a line of longitude extending through Europe and Africa
- 5th parallel north, a circle of latitude above the Equator
- 5th parallel south, a circle of latitude below the Equator
- 5th Street (disambiguation)
- Fifth Avenue (disambiguation)

== Time ==
- 5th century
- 5th century BC

=== Dates ===
- Fifth of the month, a recurring calendar date
  - Fifth of January
  - Fifth of February
  - Fifth of March
  - Fifth of April
  - Fifth of May
  - Fifth of June
  - Fifth of July
  - Fifth of August
  - Fifth of September
  - Fifth of October
  - Fifth of November
  - Fifth of December

== See also ==
- 1/5 (disambiguation)
- Fiver (disambiguation)
