= Fiver =

Fiver may refer to:

== Currency ==
- An Australian five-dollar note
- A British five-pound note
- A Canadian five-dollar note
- A five-euro note
- A United States five-dollar bill

== Other uses ==
- Fivers, a name for the Zaydi branch of Shia Islam
- Fiver (puzzle), a math game played on a 5×5 grid, distantly related to Conway's Game of Life
- Fiver (Watership Down), a fictional rabbit in the Richard Adams novel Watership Down
- "The Fiver", a humorous daily football email by The Guardian newspaper
- When a cricket bowler gets five wickets in a single inning
- Fivers Margareten, Austrian handball club

== See also ==
- 5Star, a UK TV channel operated by Channel 5 formerly known as Fiver
- Fifth columnist or saboteur, in wartime slang
- Fiverr, a global online marketplace for buying and selling services starting at $5
- Five spot (disambiguation)
- List of £5 banknotes and coins
