= Quintile =

Quintile may refer to:

- In statistics, a quantile for the case where the sample or population is divided into fifths
- Quintiles, a biotechnology research company based in the United States
- Quintile (astrology), a type of astrological aspect formed by a 72° angle

== See also ==
- 1/5 (disambiguation)
