= History of the threepence =

The threepence or threepenny bit was a denomination of currency used by various jurisdictions in England, Ireland, Scotland and Wales, valued at 1/80 of a pound or 1/4 of a shilling until decimalisation of the pound sterling and Irish pound in 1971. It was also used in some parts of the British Empire (later known as the Commonwealth), notably Australia, New Zealand and South Africa.

Before decimalisation brought about a new currency with new coinage, the sum of three pence was pronounced variously /ˈθrʊpəns/ THRUUP-ənss, /ˈθrɛp-/ THREP-, /ˈθrʌp-/ THRUP-, reflecting different pronunciations in the various regions and nations of Great Britain. Likewise, the coin was usually referred to in conversation as a /ˈθrʊpni/ THRUUP-nee, /ˈθrɛp-/ THREP-, /ˈθrʌp-/ THRUP- bit.

== Early threepences ==
The three pence coin – expressed in writing as "3d" – first appeared in England during the fine silver coinage of King Edward VI (1547–1553), when it formed part of a set of new denominations. Although it was an easy denomination to work with in the context of the old sterling coinage system, being a quarter of a shilling, initially it was not popular with the public who preferred the groat (four pence). Hence the coin was not minted in the following two reigns.

Edward VI threepences were struck at the London and York mints. The obverse shows a front-facing bust of the king, with a rose to the left and the value numeral III to the right, surrounded by the legend EDWARD VI D G ANG FRA Z HIB REX. The reverse shows a long cross over the royal shield, surrounded by the legend (London mint) POSUI DEUM ADIUTOREM MEUM (I have made God my helper), or (York mint) CIVITAS EBORACI (City of York).

Queen Elizabeth I (1558–1603) produced threepences during her third coinage (1561–1577). Most 1561 issues are 21 mm in diameter, while later ones are 19 mm in diameter. These coins are identifiable from other denominations by the rose behind the queen's head on the obverse, and the date on the reverse. The obverse shows a left-facing crowned bust of the queen with a rose behind her, surrounded by the legend ELIZABETH D G ANG FR ET HIB REGINA, while the reverse shows shield over a long cross, dated 1561, surrounded by the legend POSUI DEU ADIUTOREM MEU. Dates used for the smaller coins were 1561–77. Threepences of the fourth coinage (1578–1582) are identical except for having a slightly lower silver content. There was also a fairly rare milled coinage threepence, produced between 1561 and 1564 with similar designs and inscriptions to the hammered coinage threepences.

The threepence denomination fell out of use again during the reign of King James I, while during King Charles I's reign (1625–1649) it was not produced at the London Tower mint, but was produced (sometimes in some quantity) at various provincial mints. The denomination is identified by the numeral III appearing behind the king's head.

== Threepences reintroduced ==
By far the most common Charles I threepences were produced at the Aberystwyth mint between 1638 and 1642. They feature a left-facing crowned bust of the king with plumes in front of his face and the numeral III behind him, with the legend CAROLUS DG MA B FR ET H REX (or a combination of M(A) B F(R) ET H(I)(B) depending on the engraver), with the reverse showing the royal arms on a large oval shield with plumes above the shield, and the legend CHRISTO AUSPICE REGNO – I reign under the auspices of Christ. Plumes were the identifying symbol of the Aberystwyth mint, but the Bristol and Oxford mints often used dies from the Aberystwyth mint so plumes often appear on their output too. Milled coins were produced at the York mint between 1638 and 1649, which look similar to the Aberystwyth product but without the plumes – the obverse features a left-facing crowned bust of the king with the numeral III behind him, with the legend CAROLUS D G MAG BR FR ET HI REX, with the reverse showing the royal arms on a shield over a cross, with EBOR over the shield and the legend CHRISTO AUSPICE REGNO.

Coins were produced at the Oxford mint between 1644 and 1646, using the Aberystwyth dies for the obverse, while the reverse of the 1644 coin shows the Declaration of Oxford in three lines: RELI PRO LEG ANG LIB PAR. 1644 OX – The religion of the Protestants, the laws of England, the liberty of Parliament. 1644 Oxford, while around the outside of the coin is the legend EXURGAT DEUS DISSIPENTUR INIMICI – Let God arise and His enemies be scattered. This coin also appears dated 1646. A further type produced at Oxford had on the obverse the king's bust with the denomination behind him, and the letter "R" (for Rawlins, the maker of the die) below the king's shoulder and the legend CAROLUS D G M BR F ET H REX and the Aberystwyth reverse.

== Rarer threepences ==
The mint at Bristol produced rare threepences in 1644 and 1645. In 1644 the Aberystwyth obverse was used to produce a coin with the reverse showing the Declaration of Oxford: REL PRO LEG AN LIB PA 1644 – The religion of the Protestants, the laws of England, the liberty of Parliament 1644, while around the outside of the coin is the legend EXURGAT DEUS DISSIPENTUR INIMICI – Let God arise and His enemies be scattered. This was repeated in 1645, but with a plumelet instead of a plume in front of the king's face.

In 1644 the Exeter mint produced a fairly scarce threepence. It features a left-facing crowned bust of the king with the numeral III behind him, with the legend CAROLUS D G MA BR F ET H RE, with the reverse showing the royal arms on a shield with the date 1644 above the shield, and the legend CHRISTO AUSPICE REGNO.

No threepences were produced by the Commonwealth.

== Mid-to-late 17th century ==
The final hammered coinage threepences were produced at the start of the reign of King Charles II. In style they are very reminiscent of his father's issues, the obverse featuring the bust of the king, with the numeral III and the legend CAROLUS II D G MAG BRI F ET H REX, with the reverse showing the royal arms on a shield over a cross, and the legend CHRISTO AUSPICE REGNO.

The milled silver threepences of Charles II form two types. There is the undated issue which looks very like the earlier hammered coinage, with a crowned left-facing bust of the king with the denomination indicated by III behind his head, and the inscription CAROLVS II D G M B F & H REX, with the reverse showing a shield encircling the arms of England, Scotland, Ireland and France with the legend CHRISTO AUSPICE REGNO. This was followed by the dated issue, issued each year from 1670 to 1684, where the obverse features a right-facing uncrowned bust of the king and the inscription CAROLVS II DEI GRATIA, with the reverse showing three crowned interlinked "C"s (indicating the value) and the inscription MAG BR FRA ET HIB REX date. All milled silver threepences were 17 millimetres in diameter and weighed 1.5 grams – dimensions which were unchanged until near the end of the reign of George III.

A similar threepence was produced for King James II, dated 1685 to 1688, the obverse showing a left-facing bust of the king and the inscription IACOBVS II DEI GRATIA, with the reverse showing three crowned "I"s (indicating the value) and the inscription MAG BR FRA ET HIB REX date.

For the joint reign of King William III and Queen Mary II, threepences were produced in all years from 1689 to 1694. For the first two years a somewhat caricatured portrait of the monarchs was used, replaced by a rather more staid portrait in 1691, with the inscription GVLIELMVS ET MARIA D G, while the reverse shows a crowned Arabic number "3" and the inscription MAG BR FR ET HIB REX ET REGINA date. For the sole reign of William III, the design remained very similar, with the inscriptions changed to GVLIELMVS III DEI GRA and MAG BR FR ET HIB REX date.

== Early 18th century ==
In the reign of Queen Anne (1702–1714), the same basic design was used, with threepences produced in 1703–1710 and 1713. The obverse shows a left-facing bust of the Queen, with the inscription ANNA DEI GRATIA while the reverse shows the crowned "3" and MAG BR FR ET HIB REG date (1703–5, 1707), MAG BR FRA ET HIB REG (1706), or MAG BRI FR ET HIB REG (1708–13).

The design continued in the reign of King George I, when threepences were produced in 1717, 1721, 1723, and 1727. The obverse shows a right-facing bust of the King, with the inscription GEORGIVS DEI GRATIA while the reverse shows the crowned "3" and MAG BRI FR ET HIB REX date.

Unusually, the same young portrait of King George II was used on the threepence throughout his reign (1727–60), despite an older portrait being used on other denominations from 1743. Threepences were produced in 1729, 1731, 1732, 1735, 1737, 1739, 1740, 1743, 1746, and 1760. The obverse shows a left-facing bust of the King, with the inscription GEORGIVS II DEI GRATIA while the reverse shows the crowned "3" and MAG BRI FR ET HIB REX date.

== Change of role ==
While the silver threepence was minted as a currency coin until nearly the middle of the 20th century, it is clear that the purpose of the coin changed during the reign of King George III (1760–1820). In the first two years of minting, 1762 and 1763, the coin was obviously produced for general circulation as examples are generally found well worn; on the other hand, coins from the late issue (1817–20) are usually found in very fine condition, indicating that they were probably issued as Maundy money. Over the length of the reign there were several different designs of obverse and reverse in use. Threepences were issued in 1762–3, 1765–6, 1770, 1772, 1780, 1784, 1786, 1792, 1795, 1800, 1817, 1818, and 1820. From 1817 the dimensions of the coin were reduced to a weight of 1.4 grams and diameter of 16 millimetres, following the Great Recoinage of 1816. The inscription on the obverse reads GEORGIVS III DEI GRATIA up to 1800, and GEORGIUS III DEI GRATIA date from 1817. The reverse inscription reads MAG BRI FR ET HIB REX date up to 1800 and BRITANNIARUM REX FID DEF date from 1817.

By the start of the reign of King George IV (1820–1830) the coin was being struck primarily as a Maundy coin, although some coins were produced for use in the colonies. See Maundy money for full details of these issues. Threepences were struck in all years from 1822 to 1830, though the king's head is smaller on the 1822 issue, apparently because the correct punch broke and the one from the twopence was used instead. The obverse inscription reads GEORGIUS IIII D G BRITANNIAR REX F D, while the reverse shows a new-style crowned "3" and date, all within a wreath.

In King William IV's reign (1830–1837), maundy coins were produced in 1831–37, and identical circulation coins were produced for the colonies, identifiable only through not having a prooflike surface. The obverse inscription reads GULIELMUS IIII D G BRITANNIAR REX F D, while the reverse shows the new-style crowned "3" and date, all within a wreath.

== Queen Victoria ==
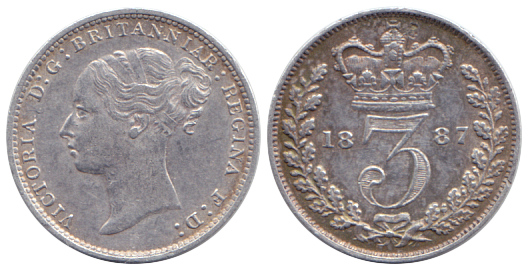
Victoria threepence 1887, "young head"

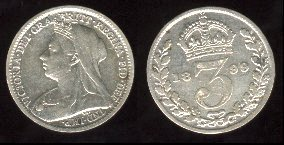
Victoria threepence 1899

During the reign of Queen Victoria, threepences were produced both for maundy use and for normal circulation in all years between 1838 and 1901 except 1847, 1848, and 1852 (probably because of the possible advent of a decimal currency at the time (see florin), when the 3d at 1/80 of a pound would not have fitted within a decimal system). Currency silver threepences from 1838 to 1926 were of identical design and cannot usually be distinguished except in the best conditions when the higher striking standard of the maundy coins stand out; this resulted in the curious legal anomaly that when the currency was decimalised in 1971 all silver threepences from 1870 onwards were revalued at three new pence, not just the maundy coins. Threepences were produced with both the "young head" (1838–1887) and "Jubilee head" (1887–1893), inscribed VICTORIA D G BRITANNIAR REGINA F D, while those produced with the "old head" (1893–1901) are inscribed VICTORIA DEI GRA BRITT REGINA FID DEF IND IMP.

== Early 20th century ==
The currency threepence was issued for each of the nine years of the reign of King Edward VII from 1902. The reverse design remained the same, while the obverse showed the right-facing effigy of the king, with the inscription EDWARDVS VII D G BRITT OMN REX F D IND IMP.

The reign of King George V (1910–1936) features several changes to the threepence denomination. As with all British silver coins, the silver content was reduced from sterling (0.925) silver to 50% silver, 40% copper, 10% nickel in 1920, 50% silver, 50% copper in 1922, and 50% silver, 40% copper, 5% nickel, 5% zinc in 1927, while the design of the reverse of the circulating threepence (but not the maundy threepence) was completely changed in 1927 to three oak sprigs with three acorns and a "G" in the centre, and the inscription THREE PENCE date. The inscription on the obverse throughout the reign was GEORGIVS V D G BRITT OMN REX F D IND IMP.

The threepences of King Edward VIII were all patterns awaiting royal approval at the time of the abdication in December 1936. The silver threepence had another completely new reverse – three interlinked rings of Saint Edmund, with the inscription FID DEF IND IMP 1937 THREE PENCE, while the obverse shows a left-facing effigy of the king with the inscription EDWARDVS VIII D G BR OMN REX and a very small silver engravement.

== Brass vs silver threepences ==
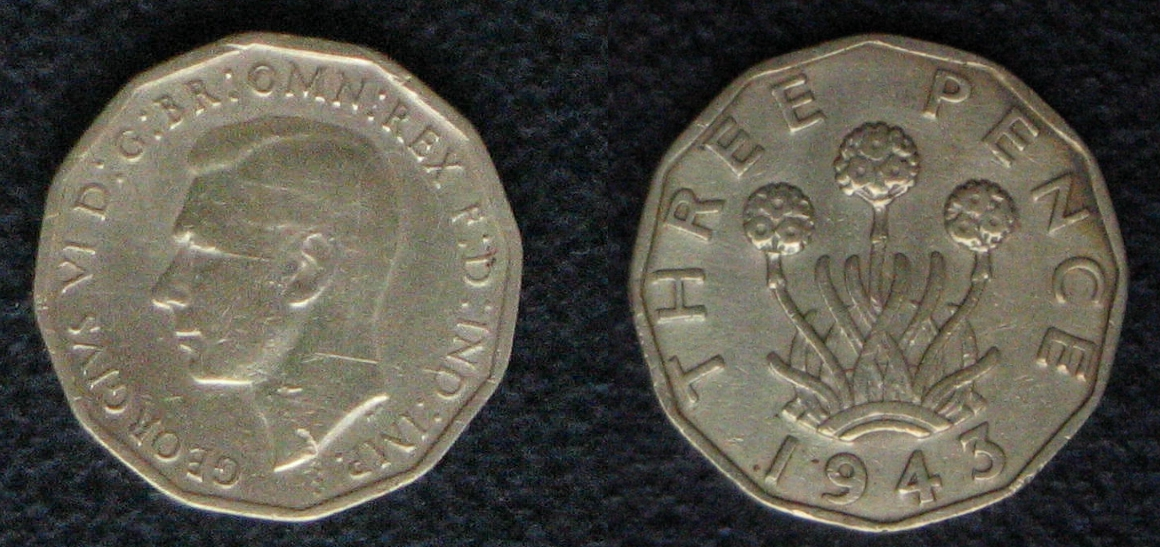
A 1943 brass threepenny bit

By the end of George V's reign the threepence had become unpopular in England because of its small size (George Orwell comments on this in Keep the Aspidistra Flying), but it remained popular in Scotland. It was consequently decided to introduce a more substantial threepenny coin which would have a more convenient weight/value ratio than the silver coinage. The silver threepence continued to be minted, as there may have been some uncertainty about how well the new coin would be accepted. The Edward VIII era saw the planned introduction of a new, larger, nickel-brass (79% copper, 20% zinc, 1% nickel) twelve-sided threepence coin. This coin weighed 6.6 grams and the diameter was 21 mm across the sides and 22 mm across the corners. The obverse shows a left-facing effigy of the king (not right as would have been the convention to alternate the direction) with the inscription EDWARDVS VIII D G BR OMN REX F D IND IMP, and the reverse shows a three-headed thrift plant with the inscription THREE PENCE 1937. A total of just 12 of these coins were struck for experimental purposes and sent to a slot machine manufacturing company for testing. The whereabouts of six of those 12 are known. However, the other six are still out there somewhere and, as such, they are extremely rare today. There are two types of Edward VIII brass threepences. The first type has the date broken by a thrift plant design and the second has the date below.

During the reign of King George VI, circulation silver threepences were produced only in 1937–1945 (and almost all the 1945 examples were subsequently melted down). The obverse shows a left-facing effigy of the king with the inscription GEORGIVS VI D G BR OMN REX, while the reverse has an elegant design of a shield of St George lying on a Tudor rose, dividing the date, with the inscription FID DEF IND IMP THREE PENCE. The nickel-brass threepence took over the bulk of the production of the denomination, being produced in all years between 1937 and 1952 except 1947. Apart from the king's head and name, and the weight being increased to 6.8 grams, the coin was identical to that prepared for Edward VIII. Coins dated 1946 and 1949 were minted in far fewer numbers than the rest, and as nickel-brass wears very quickly, higher grade specimens of these coins are expensive to buy now (both over £500 for uncirculated examples). The scarce dates are 1948, 1950 and 1951 and these are now selling for £60 – £80 in mint state.

== Elizabeth II threepences ==
The physical dimensions of the brass threepence remained the same in the reign of Queen Elizabeth II. The effigy of the queen produced by Mary Gillick was used, with the inscription ELIZABETH II DEI GRA BRITT OMN REGINA F D used in 1953, and ELIZABETH II DEI GRATIA REGINA F D used in all other years. The reverse shows a Tudor portcullis with chains and a coronet, with the inscription THREE PENCE date. This coin was produced in all years from 1953 to 1967, and in 1970 (in proof sets only).

Following decimalisation, the brass threepence ceased to be legal tender after 31 August 1971.

== The Commonwealth ==
A three pence coin was also used in the pre-decimalisation currencies of Commonwealth of Nations countries such as Fiji, Australia, and New Zealand. It was called a tickey in South Africa and Southern Rhodesia.

== Building ==
No. 1 Croydon was known for many years as the "threepenny bit building" for its resemblance to a stack of threepenny coins. After the coins were phased out (beginning in 1970) the building eventually gained a new nickname: the "50p building".

== The 12-sided coin reprised ==
In March 2014, the Royal Mint announced that a new design of one pound coin will be introduced in 2017, reprising the twelve-sided shape. The new coin is designed to be more difficult to counterfeit.

== See also ==
- Irish three-pence coin
- Australian pound
- New Zealand pound
