= 1/5 =

1/5 may refer to:

- January 5, the date
- 1 May, the date
- Quintile, a 5-quantile in statistics
- One and five, 1 shilling and 5 pence in pre-decimal British Coinage
- 1st Battalion 5th Marines
- One to five betting odds

== See also ==
- 5
- Quintile (disambiguation)
- Fifth (disambiguation)
