= Third farthing =

Former piece of British coinage

- United Kingdom
- Value: £0.0003472̅; 0.083̅d
- Mass: (1827–1844) 1.5–1.6 g (1866–1913) 0.9–1 g
- Diameter: 16 mm
- Composition: (1827–1844) copper (1866–1913) bronze
- Years of minting: 1827, 1835, 1844, 1866, 1868, 1876, 1878, 1881, 1884, 1885, 1902, 1913

Obverse
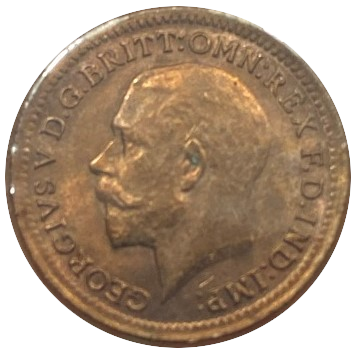
- Design: Profile of the monarch (George V design shown)
- Designer: Bertram Mackennal

Reverse
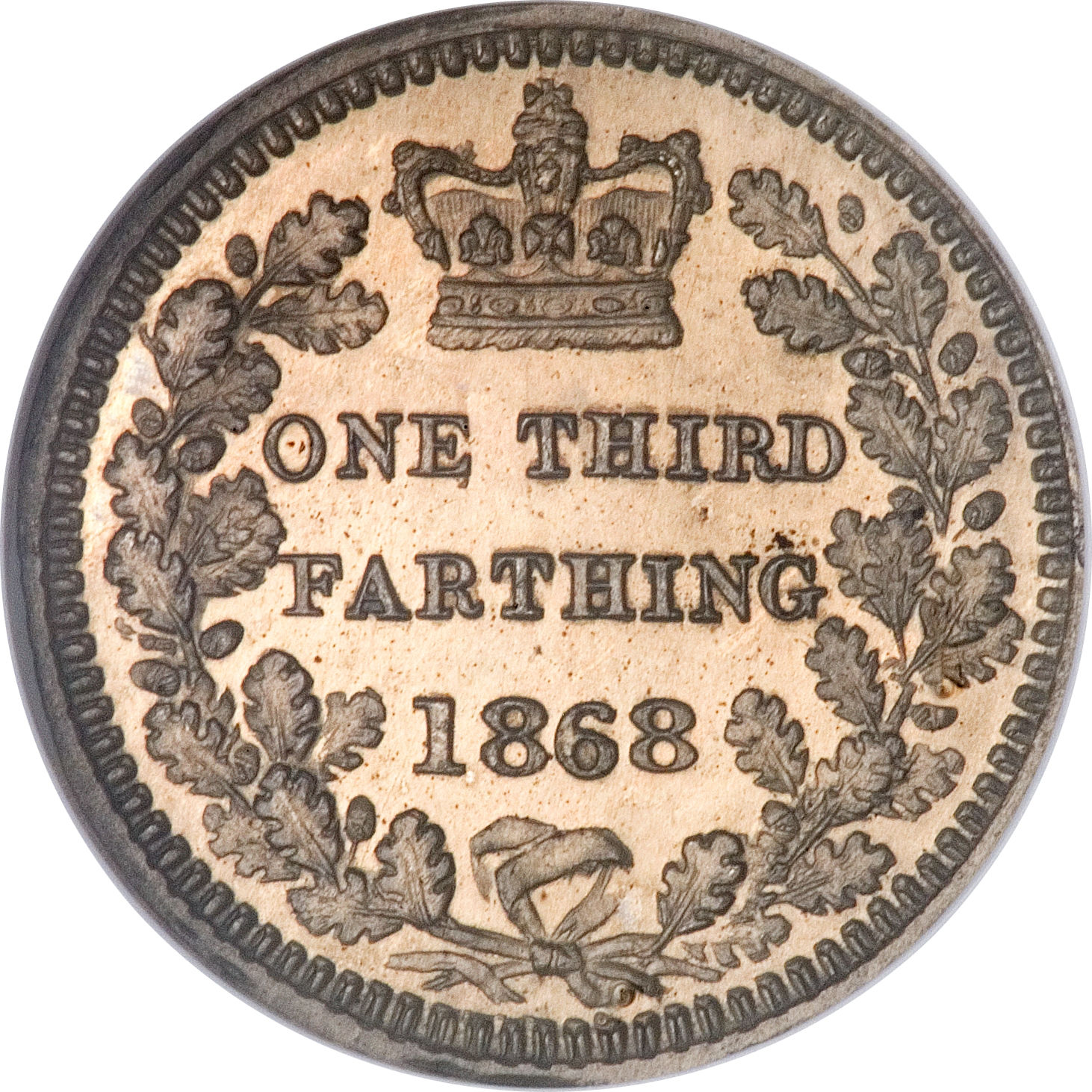
- Design: Various (Crown-and-oak-wreath design shown)
- Designer: Leonard Charles Wyon
- Design date: 1866

The third farthing was a British coin worth 1/2880 of a pound, 1/144 of a shilling, or 1/12 of a penny. It was minted in copper in 1827, 1835, and 1844, and in bronze in various years between 1866 and 1913. While exclusively authorised for use in the Crown Colony of Malta, third farthings are catalogued as British coinage because they are fractions of British currency, and Malta otherwise used standard coins of the pound sterling.

== History ==
When Malta became a British protectorate in 1800, the local monetary standard was the Maltese scudo issued by the Knights Hospitaller in the 18th century, though foreign currencies also circulated. One scudo could be divided into 240 grani, which were small bronze coins. Colloquially, Maltese speakers referred to a grano (and later a third farthing) as a ħabba, the Maltese word for a 'grain'. The lowest denomination of British coinage, the farthing, was equivalent to three grani.

In 1825, the British authorities made British coinage the monetary standard of Malta. On 3 November 1827, a proclamation declared British copper coins the colony's sole legal copper currency and ordered that "a copper coin of less value than the British farthing should be provided for the accommodation of the population". The Royal Mint issued 1,440,000 third farthings, or "British grains", to replace the older grani. Although the third farthing corresponded to the British monetary standard, the coins were exclusively used in Malta and were not legal tender in the United Kingdom.

The Governor of Malta had requested that the coins bear the legend "MALTA – ONE GRAIN", but instead mint officials used the designs as William Wyon's obverse and reverse for the British farthing. The obverse bore a portrait of George IV and the date, while the reverse depicted a seated Britannia with a shield and trident, surrounded by the legend BRITANNIAR: REX FID: DEF:. The 1827 coins were struck in copper and weighed between 1.5 and 1.6 grammes and had a 16-millimetre diameter. Subsequent issues were authorised in copper to the same size and weight standard in 1835 and 1844, bearing William Wyon's obverse portraits of William IV and Queen Victoria, respectively.

In 1866, third farthings were issued in bronze instead of copper. They had a 16-millimetre diameter and weighed between 0.9 and 1.0 gramme. The obverse bore a portrait of a laureate Queen Victoria, while the reverse was redesigned to include the denomination and date surrounded by a wreath of oak leaves and a royal crown. Both sides were designed by Leonard Charles Wyon, and appeared on subsequent Victoria coins in 1868, 1876, 1878, 1881, 1884, and 1885.

In 1902, the British authorities issued £100 or 288,000 Edward VII third farthings, using an obverse by George William de Saulles and an updated version L. C. Wyon's crown-and-oak-wreath reverse with an imperial crown. A final issue of £100 or 288,000 third farthings were struck in 1913 under George V. The obverse was by Bertram Mackennal, while the reverse reused the design of the 1902 issue with the imperial crown.

Although pre-decimal British coinage remained the Maltese monetary standard until May 1972, the third farthing appears to have gone out of circulation by the 1930s.

In 2015, the Central Bank of Malta issued 2,500 €5 gold bullion commemorative coins in honour of the third farthing. The obverse showed the date and emblem of Malta. The reverse was inspired by William Wyon's seated-Britannia design of the 1827, 1835, and 1844 issues.
