= Crown of the Rose =

A Crown of the Rose is an extremely rare gold coin of the Kingdom of England introduced in 1526 during the reign of Henry VIII, in an attempt to compete with the French écu au soleil. The coin was not a success and just a few months later it was replaced by the Crown of the Double-Rose.

== Crown of the Rose ==
The Crown of the Rose coin was valued at four shillings and sixpence (4s. 6d.), it weighed 3.5 grams and had a gold content of 23 ct. It was only struck for a few months. Due to its very short circulation, there are currently only three known specimens.

Crown of the Rose #1, discovered in or just prior to 1907, is in the museum of the American Numismatic Society in New York. Provenance - J. Sandford Saltus; president of both the New York Numismatic Club and British Numismatic Society.

Crown of the Rose #2 is in the British Museum. It is described as having been acquired in 1920. This coin was previously drilled to be used as a necklace medallion

Crown of the Rose #3, same type as above, was reported bought by Spink of London in 1961 for £4,000 "from a man in Northumberland who had a collection of silver and gold coins, not thinking there was much of value in them". Spink's example is no doubt the one appearing in their catalogue (#2272), and looks to be the finest of the three - superbly struck and with very little wear.

Obverse
Depicts a crowned shield with the arms of England and France. Legend: HENRIC 8 DEI GRA REX AGL Z FRAC, meaning "Henry VIII, by the Grace of God King of England and France."

Reverse
Depicts a large rose with two crowned letters "h" and two lions. Legend of two varieties: HENRIC RUTILANS ROSA SINE SPINA meaning "Henry, a dazzling rose without a thorn" and DNS HIB RUTILANS ROSA SINE SPINA meaning "Lord of Ireland, a dazzling rose without a thorn."

== Crown of the Double-Rose ==
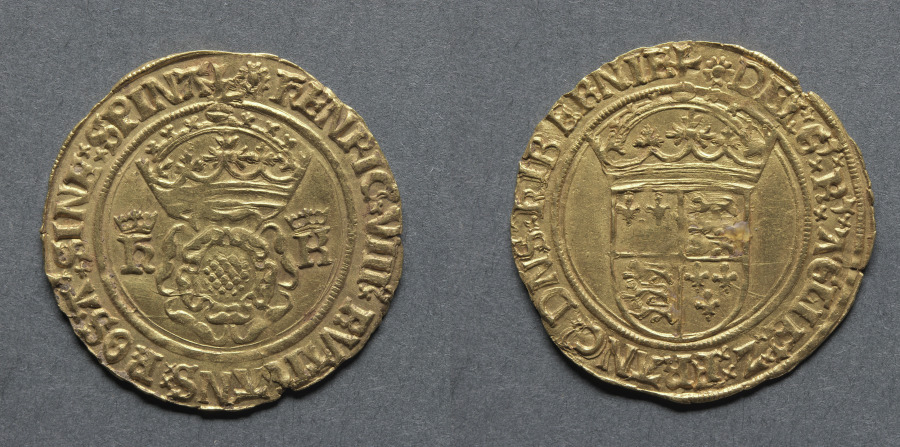
Crown of the Double Rose (H for Henry VIII and K for Katherine of Aragon), dating to 1526–33

The Crown of the Double-Rose was valued at 5 shillings (5s), weighed 57.5 grains (3.73 grams), and had a diameter of 26 mm, but with a lower gold content of 22 ct. This was the first time gold had been minted below the standard of 23 ct. This coin proved to be more popular than its predecessor and was struck until Henry's death in 1547, although it continued to be minted until 1551 during the reign of Edward VI as "posthumous coinage".

Obverse

Depicts a crowned shield with the arms of England and France and either blank or the crowned letters "hK" (for Henry and Katherine, referring to Catherine of Aragon or possibly on later coins Catherine Howard), "hA" (for Anne Boleyn), "hI" (for Jane Seymour) or "hR" (Henry Rex). Legend: DEI GR ANGLIE FRANC DNS HIBERNIE meaning "By the Grace of God, King of England [and] France, Lord of Ireland.

Reverse

Depicts a large crowned rose with the crowned letters "hK", "hA", "hI" or "hR" as on the obverse, but not necessarily the same. Legend: HENRIC VIII RUTILANS ROSA SINE SPINA meaning "Henry VIII, a dazzling rose without a thorn."

== Half-crown ==
There was also a Half-crown struck, based on the design of the Crown of the Double-Rose. It was valued at two shillings and six pence (2s/6d), weighed 1.85 grams and had a diameter of 20 mm. It was struck during the same period as the Crown of the Double-Rose.

Obverse

Similar depiction as for the Crown of the Double-Rose, with uncrowned letters. Legend: HENRIC 8 D G AGL FR Z HIB REX, meaning "Henry 8, by the Grace of God of England, France and Ireland King."

Reverse

Similar depiction as Crown of the Double-Rose with uncrowned letters. Legend: RUTILANS ROSA SINE SPINA, meaning "a dazzling rose without a thorn."
