= Farthing Common =

Common land in East Kent, England

Coordinates: 51°7′22″N 1°3′7″E

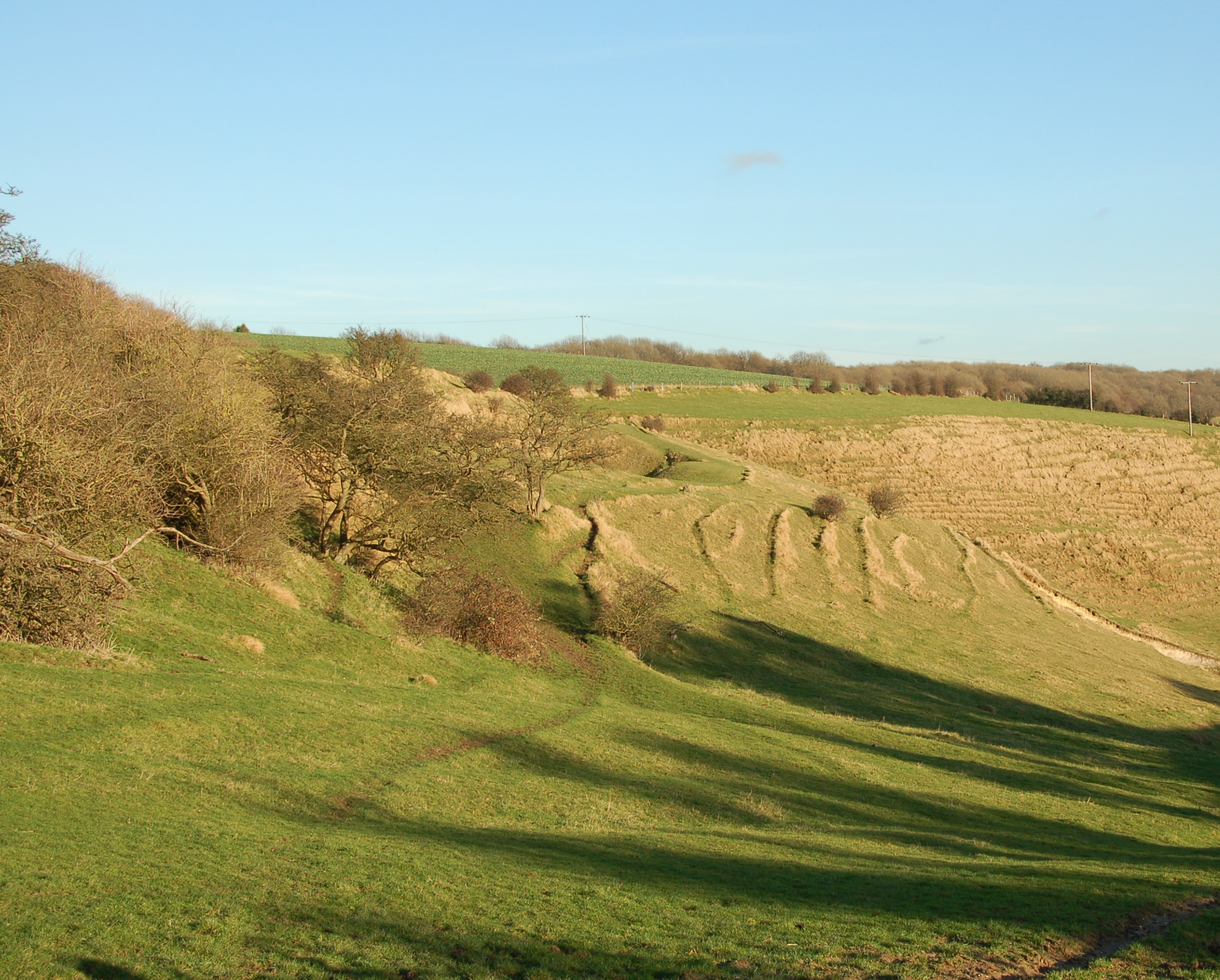
Postling Downs just east of Farthing Common

Farthing Common is an area of common land about 10 km northwest of Folkestone in East Kent. It is one of the highest points of the North Downs at 185 metres above sea level, and was the junction of the ancient trackway along the Downs from Folkestone, with the Roman road (now the B2068 Stone Street) between Lympne and Canterbury.

From the common there are extensive views across Kent and on a clear day it is possible to see as far as the Cliffs at Fairlight in Sussex and even the South Downs. Just east of Farthing Common are Postling Downs which is a rich area of semi-improved chalk grassland with a variety of plant species including orchids.

Farthing Common saw the final King of the Mountains climb during the first stage of the 2007 Tour de France, which was held in Kent. The climb was taken by Stéphane Augé.
