= Fifth of July =

Fifth of July may refer to:

== Dates ==
- July 5
- Independence Day (Venezuela)
- Fifth of July (New York)

== Other uses ==
- Fifth of July (play) by Lanford Wilson
- The Fifth of July, album by Watershed
