= Five spot =

Five spot may refer to:

- Five Spot Café, a jazz club in New York City.
- Eremalche rotundifolia (desert five spot), a flowering plant in the mallow family
- Nemophila maculata (fivespot), a flowering plant in the borage family

== See also ==
- Coccinellidae, a family of small beetles, including five spot ladybird
- Glyphidocera lactiflosella, the five-spotted glyphidocera moth
- 5 (disambiguation)
- Spot (disambiguation)
