= Quarter farthing =

Former piece of British coinage

- United Kingdom
- Value: 1/16d sterling
- Mass: 1.2 g
- Diameter: 13.5 mm
- Edge: Plain
- Composition: (1839–1853) copper (1868) bronze
- Years of minting: 1839, 1851–1853, 1868

Obverse
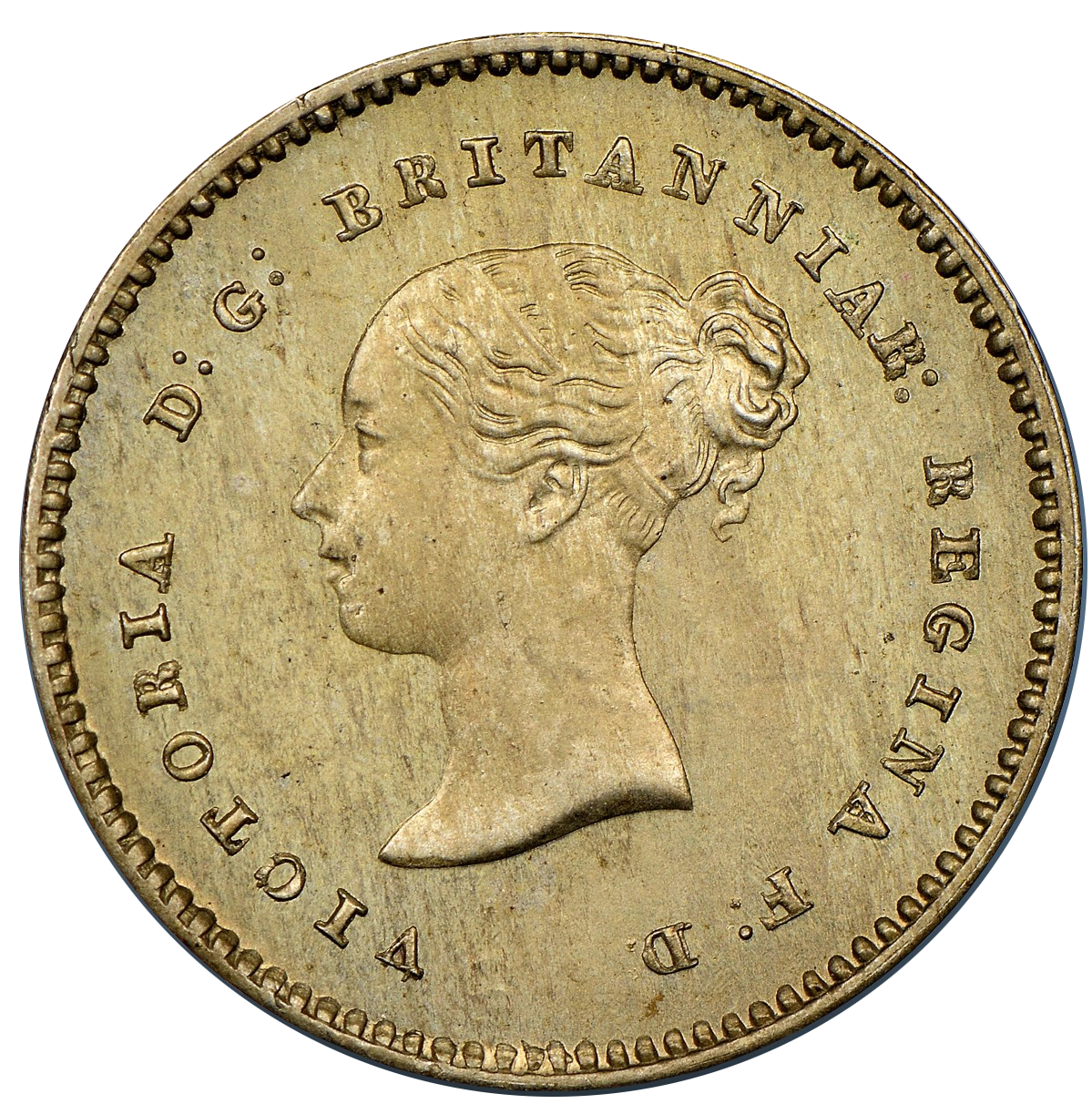
- Design: Queen Victoria
- Designer: William Wyon
- Design date: 1839

Reverse
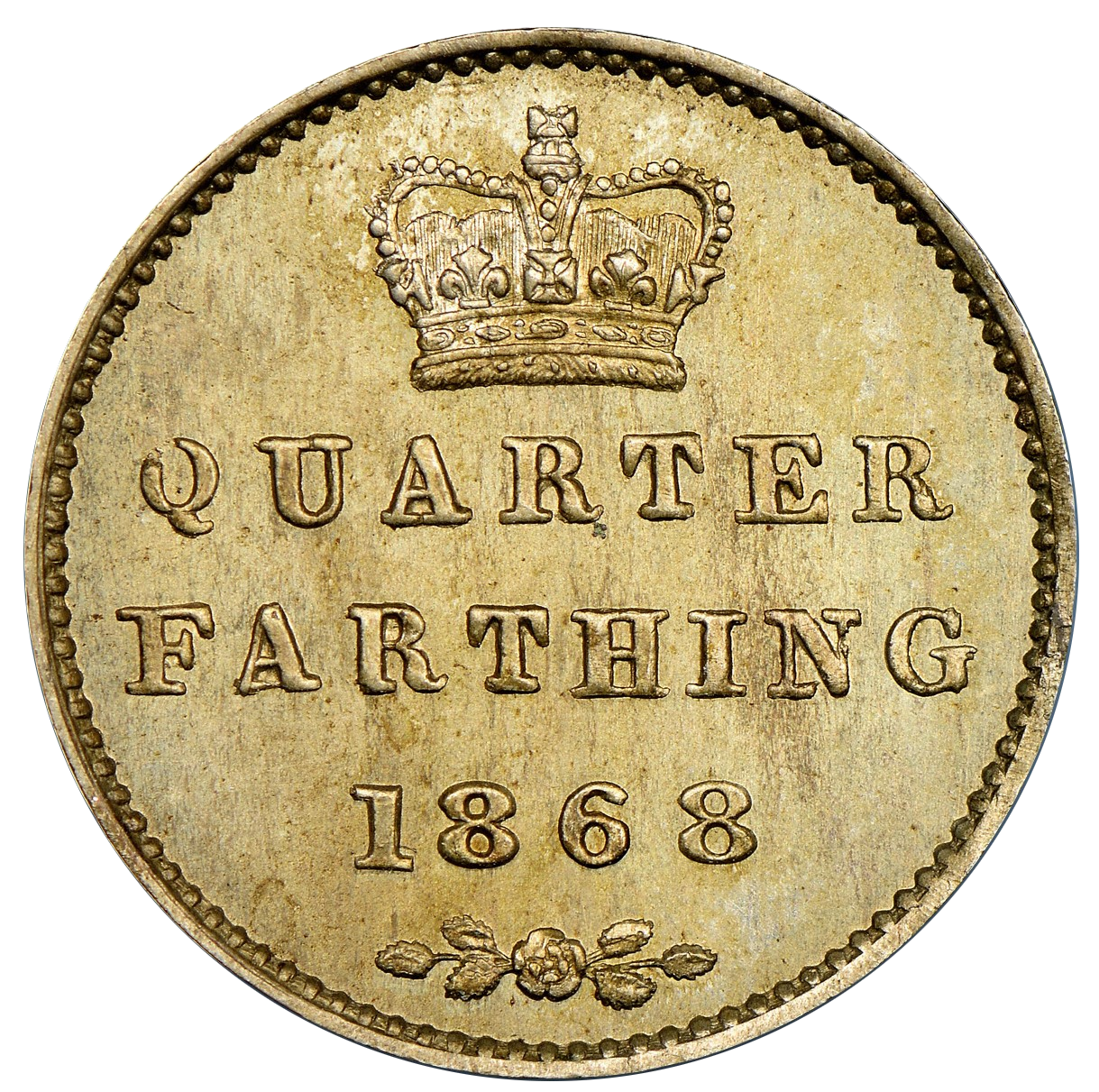
- Design: Crown and rose
- Design date: 1839

The quarter farthing was a denomination of sterling coinage worth 1/16 of an old penny, or 1/192 of a shilling. The Royal Mint issued the coins in copper for exclusive use in British Ceylon in 1839, 1851, 1852, and 1853. The mint also produced bronze proofs in 1868.

The obverse of the coins used William Wyon's obverse die for the Maundy twopence, bearing a left-facing portrait of Queen Victoria and the legend VICTORIA D: G: BRITANNIAR: REGINA F: D:. Wyon designed the reverse to feature a royal crown above the words QUARTER FARTHING and the date. Below the date, the coins featured a heraldic rose with three leaves on either side. The coins were made of copper, weighed 1.2 gramme, and had a diameter of 13.5 millimetres. The mint struck proof quarter farthings in bronze and copper-nickel in 1868, but did not issue any quarter farthings for circulation that year.

While quarter farthings were never legal tender in the United Kingdom, they are fractions of the British farthing, which was currency in Ceylon, and traditionally have been catalogued as British coinage.
