= Miliangos v George Frank Ltd =

Ruling that English courts can compel payment in foreign currencies

Miliangos v George Frank (Textiles) Ltd
- Court: House of Lords
- Full case name: Miliangos v George Frank (Textiles) Ltd
- Decided: 5 November 1975
- Citation: [1976] AC 443

Court membership
- Judges sitting: Lord Wilberforce; Lord Cross of Chelsea; Lord Edmund-Davies; Lord Simon; Lord Fraser of Tullybelton

Keywords
- Contract, Currency, Debt, Pound Sterling

Miliangos v George Frank Ltd, [1976] AC 443 is a leading decision of the House of Lords enforcement of debts. The case created the Miliangos rule that allows creditors under a contract to obtain judgment under a foreign currency. The Lords stated that the date of payment would be the date of conversion to the foreign currency.

The case also includes a significant discussion of the doctrine of judicial precedent in English law, including the doctrines of ratio decidendi and per incuriam. It represents a rare occasion in which their Lordships invoked the Practice Statement and overturned a previous precedent of the House of Lords, which had held that all debts were to be paid in sterling.

== Background ==
Miliangos was a Swiss textile producer who sold and delivered textiles to George Frank Ltd, textile trade located in England. George Frank refused to pay for the textiles. Miliangos sued George Frank in England for the amount of the debt in the currency of the contract which was Swiss francs.

Over the time of the litigation, the exchange rate between the Swiss franc and the pound dropped dramatically. The traditional rule required that the debt in Swiss francs be converted to pounds on the date of the breach. Miliangos would lose a significant amount of the value of the money owed if paid in pounds due to the exchange rate.

The issue before the House of Lords was whether the English courts were able to order a judgment in any currency besides pounds sterling.

The Lords ruled that the debt could be paid in Swiss francs, breaking a line of authority over 200 years old. The claimant applying for the payment of foreign currency must show reasons for it based on losses suffered outside the domestic jurisdiction. The conversion date to be used is the date of payment.

In dissent, Lord Simon stated that the new rule gave too much advantage to the claimants and said that this task should normally be established by the Parliament. He also tried to influence the other Lords to accept the prospective overruling; which already exists in other common law countries like the USA.

== See also ==
- Legal tender
- List of House of Lords cases
