= Fifty pounds (British coin) =

Commemorative denomination of the pound sterling

- United Kingdom
- Value: £50.00 pound sterling
- Mass: 31 g
- Diameter: 34.00 mm
- Edge: Milled
- Composition: .999 fine silver
- Years of minting: 2015

Obverse
- Design: Elizabeth II
- Designer: Jody Clark
- Design date: 2015

Reverse
- Design: Britannia
- Designer: Jody Clark
- Design date: 2015

The British fifty pound coin (£50) is a commemorative denomination of sterling coinage made from over 99% silver with a nominal value of fifty pounds. Issued for the first time by the Royal Mint in 2015 and sold at face value, fifty pound coins hold legal tender status to unlimited amounts, but are intended as collector's items and are not found in general circulation.

== Design ==
The designs which have appeared on the fifty pound coin's reverse are summarised in the table below.

Year	Event	Design	Edge inscription	Designer
2015	-	Britannia	-	Jody Clark
2016	Death of William Shakespeare (400th anniversary)	-	-	John Bergdahl

== See also ==
- Coins of the pound sterling
- Twenty pounds (British coin)
- One hundred pounds (British coin)
