= Twenty pounds (British coin) =

British coin

- United Kingdom
- Value: £20.00 pound sterling
- Mass: 15.71 g
- Diameter: approx 27 mm
- Edge: Milled
- Composition: .999 fine silver
- Years of minting: 2013-present

Obverse
- Design: Elizabeth II
- Designer: Ian Rank-Broadley
- Design date: 1998

Reverse
- Design: No standard reverse design;

The British twenty pound piece (£20) is a commemorative denomination of sterling coinage, first issued by the Royal Mint in 2013. It has a nominal value of twenty pounds. It is minted with over 99% silver. Twenty pound coins are legal tender in unlimited amounts, but are intended as souvenirs and are almost never seen in general circulation.

== Design ==
The designs that have appeared on the twenty pound coin's reverse are summarised in the table below.

=== Welsh Dragon £20 ===
From 2016 to 2020, the Royal Mint produced a Welsh Dragon £20 coin against a backdrop of the visitor centre at the Royal Mint Experience. Some of these years have been accompanied by the same coin on a backdrop of the Welsh flag. The visitor centre coin could only be purchased at the shop.

Year	Event	Design	Edge Inscription	Designer
2013	–	Saint George and the Dragon	Milled	Benedetto Pistrucci
2014	The 100th anniversary of the outbreak of the First World War	Britannia and a lion on the left-hand side with warships in the background. An inscription above and to the right reads THE FIRST WORLD WAR, and below and to the left of that the dates 1914-1918	Milled	John Bergdahl
2015	The 50th anniversary of Sir Winston Churchill's death	Winston Churchill	Milled	Etienne Millner
2015	The Longest Reigning Monarch	The five portraits of Queen Elizabeth II to appear on British coinage above the words "EIIR The Longest Reign"	Milled	Stephen Taylor
2016	90th Birthday of Queen Elizabeth II	The royal cypher wreathed and crowned, all surrounded by roses	Milled	Christopher Hobbs
2016	Welsh Dragon Celebration	The Welsh dragon	Milled	Norman Sillman
2016	Christmas	The nativity	Milled	Gregory Cameron
2017	Platinum Wedding Anniversary of Queen Elizabeth II and Prince Philip	Equestrian portrait of the Queen and Prince Philip	Milled	John Bergdahl
2019	Welsh Dragon Celebration	The Welsh dragon	Milled	Norman Sillman

== Legal tender status ==
The prolific issuance since 2013 of silver commemorative £20, £50, and £100 coins at face value has led to attempts to spend or deposit these coins, prompting the Royal Mint to clarify the legal tender status of these silver coins. Royal Mint guidelines advise that they are considered to be limited edition collectables and are not intended for general circulation, despite still being legal tender.

== See also ==
- Fifty pounds (British coin)
- One hundred pounds (British coin)
- Five pounds (British coin)
