= One hundred pounds (British coin) =

Commemorative denomination of the pound sterling

- United Kingdom
- Value: £100.00 pound sterling
- Mass: 62.86 g
- Diameter: 40.00 mm
- Edge: Milled
- Composition: .999 fine silver
- Years of minting: 2015–2022

Obverse
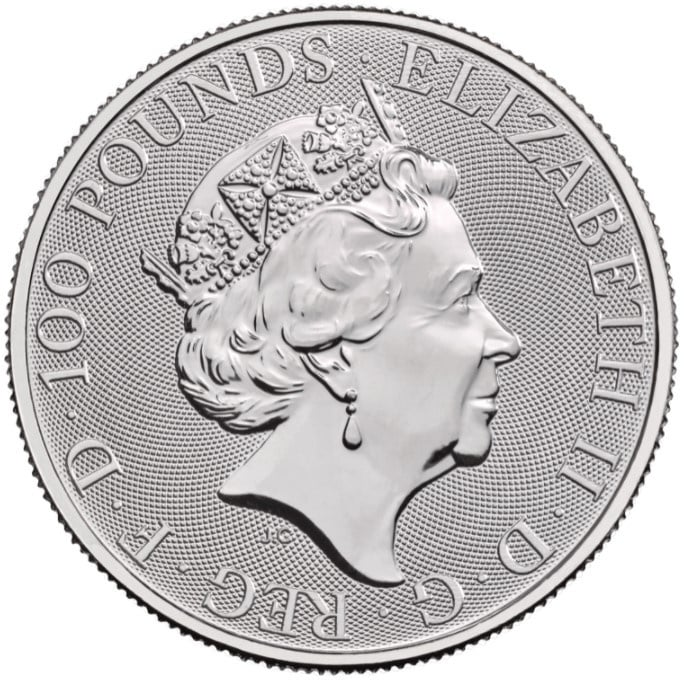
- Design: Elizabeth II
- Designer: Ian Rank-Broadley
- Design date: 1998
- Design: Elizabeth II
- Designer: Jody Clark
- Design date: 2015

Reverse
- Design: Elizabeth Tower (Big Ben)
- Designer: Glyn Davies and Laura Clancy
- Design date: 2015
- Design: Buckingham Palace
- Designer: Glyn Davies and Laura Clancy
- Design date: 2015
- Design: Trafalgar Square
- Designer: Glyn Davies and Laura Clancy
- Design date: 2016

The British one hundred pound piece (£100) is a commemorative denomination of sterling coinage made from over 99% silver with a nominal value of one hundred pounds sterling. Issued for the first time by the Royal Mint in 2015 and sold at face value, £100 coins hold legal tender status to unlimited amounts. They are intended as collector's items and are rarely found in general circulation. As of 1 November 2024, the silver content of each coin (in bullion quantities) was worth about £46.

== Design ==
The designs which have appeared on the £100 coin's reverse are summarised in the table below.

Year	Design	Designer
2015	Elizabeth Tower (Big Ben)	Davies & Clancy
2015	Buckingham Palace	Davies & Clancy
2016	Trafalgar Square	Davies & Clancy

=== Elizabeth Tower (Big Ben) ===
The first minting of a new commemorative coin denominated £100 was announced on 29 December 2014. The coins contain 62.86 grams (2.021 troy ounces; 2.217 ounces) of fine silver, with a diameter of 40.00 millimetres (1.575 in). The first mintage of this denomination totalled 50,000 coins.

The 2015 issue features the Ian Rank-Broadley portrait of Queen Elizabeth II on the obverse and an image of Elizabeth Tower, often called Big Ben after the bell it houses, on the reverse.

=== Buckingham Palace ===
In August 2015, the Royal Mint announced a second £100 coin would be minted. The new issue, as with the previous one, would be limited to 50,000 coins, each made of .999 fine silver, weighing 62.86 grams (2.021 ozt) and having a diameter of 40.00 millimetres (1.575 in).

This second issue features an image of Buckingham Palace by Glyn Davies and Laura Clancy on the reverse, while on the obverse is a portrait of Queen Elizabeth II by Jody Clark, making it the first face-value coin to feature that portrait.

=== Trafalgar Square ===
In 2016, the Royal Mint announced a third £100 coin would be minted, featuring Trafalgar Square. The new issue was limited to 45,000 coins, each made of .999 fine silver, weighing 62.86 grams (2.021 ozt) and having a diameter of 40.00 millimetres (1.575 in).

== Legal tender status ==
The prolific issuance since 2013 of silver commemorative £20, £50 and £100 coins at face value has led to attempts to spend or deposit these coins, prompting the Royal Mint to clarify the legal tender status of these coins. Royal Mint guidelines advise that, although the coins are legal tender, they are considered limited edition collectables not intended for general circulation, and hence shops and banks are not obliged to accept them.

== See also ==
- Coins of the pound sterling
- Twenty pounds (British coin)
- Fifty pounds (British coin)
- Sovereign (British coin)
