= Postage stamp demonetization =

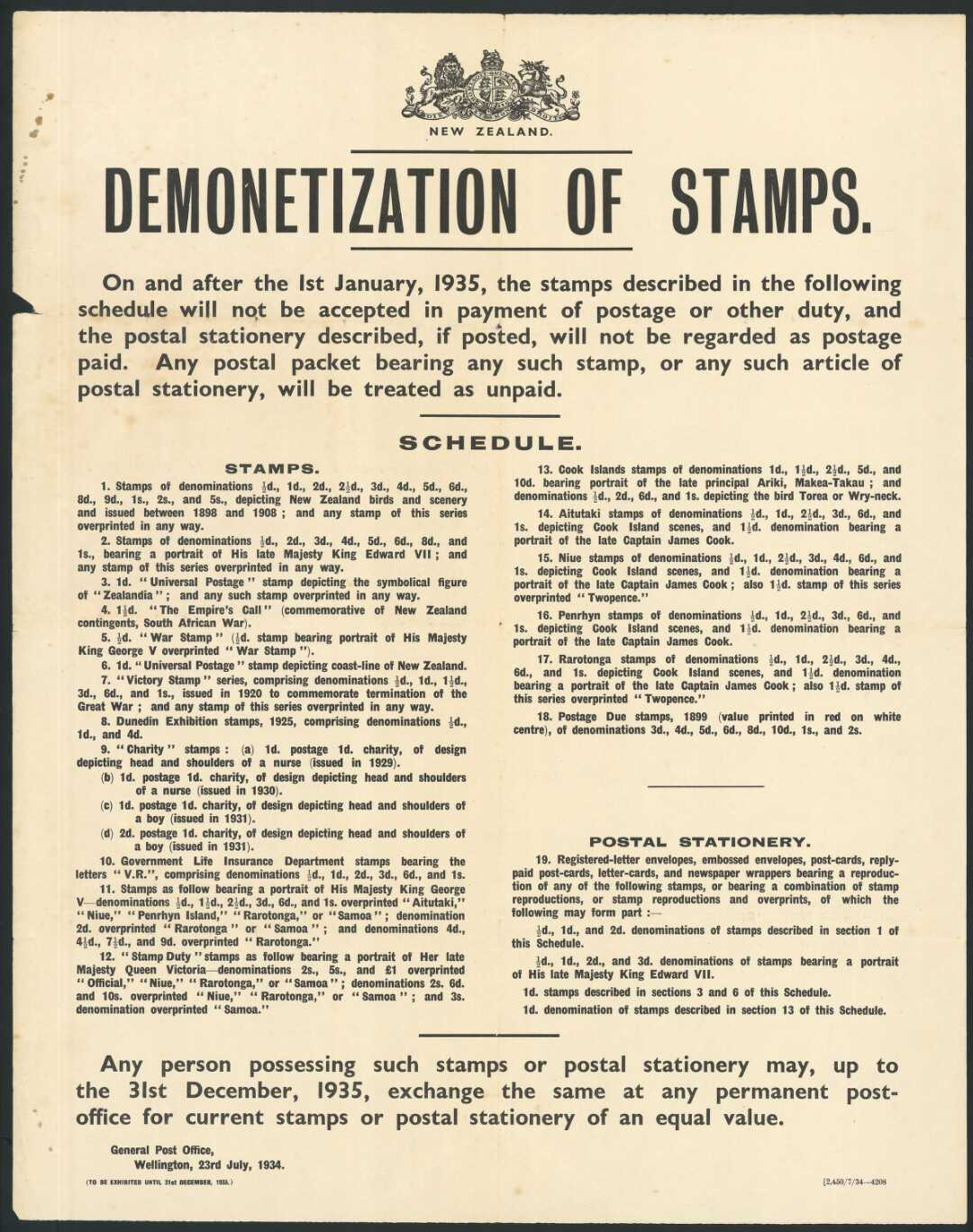
1935 New Zealand Post Office stamp demonitization notice

The demonetization of postage and revenue stamps is the process by which the stamps are rendered no longer valid. In general, stamp demonetization is a rare event, since any unused stamp is effectively equivalent to its face value, and there is no financial disadvantage if postal customers use old stamps on their mail. Demonetization chiefly occurs in connection with major upheavals in the postal system, such as a transfer from one country to another, or currency changes, such as decimalisation, or a change of government. The process of exchanging millions or billions of stamps in the public's hands, plus that of exchanging post office stock, is usually complicated and difficult, and offers much interest for students of postal history.

There are typically two parts to the process; first, the exchange of unused stamps for new ones of equivalent value. This normally occurs at post offices, with patrons bringing in their old stamps. The second part is the handling of mail with stamps already on it. Uncancelled letters, such as those dropped in mailbox, will get a grace period, ending at roughly the same time as the exchange of old stamps. Cancelled letters already in the mailstream may be accepted for a longer period, since remote post offices may not yet have exchanged their stamps, and sometimes there may be delays within the postal system itself.

== Eurozone ==
In the Eurozone, some countries have demonetized stamps denominated in the old currency while others have not. The countries where pre-euro stamps are still valid include Belgium, France, Italy and San Marino.

=== Austria ===
Austrian stamps denominated in schillings were demonetized on 1 July 2002.

=== Belgium ===
Belgian stamps denominated in francs will be demonetized on 1 January 2028; presently, franc-denominated stamps are usable on some mail pieces, but not on parcels or registered mail. Stamps denominated in euros will be valid indefinitely.

=== Finland ===
Finnish stamps denominated in markkaa were demonetized at the end of 2011.

=== France ===
All French stamps issued since 1849 - including those denominated in old or new francs - are valid for postage, except the following issues:

- Certain commemorative stamps from the 1920 series
- Caisse d'amortissement stamps
- Certain stamps benefitting the Red Cross
- Stamps with an effigy of Philippe Pétain

No dates has been set for the demonetization of franc-denominated stamps.

Stamps with a face value in new francs are valid for postage at a rate of €1 = 6.56 F. Face values of old franc-denominated stamps are first re-expressed into new francs (at a rate of 1 new franc = 100 old francs) before that value is converted into euros.

=== Germany ===
German stamps denominated in Deutsche Marks were demonetized on 1 July 2002. All stamps issued since 9 November 2000 are valid for postage.

=== Ireland ===
Irish stamps denominated in pounds were demonetized on 31 December 2002. Stamps issued since 2 August 2000 are valid for postage.

=== Italy ===
Italian stamps denominated in Lire are valid, if issued after March 20, 1967. All Italian stamps issued in Euro and Lire-Euro are valid for postage.

=== Malta ===
Malta adopted the euro on 1 January 2008. Stamps issued shortly before and after the changeover (between 22 December 2006 and 28 June 2008) were denominated in both the Maltese lira and euro currencies in accordance with guidelines issued by the National Euro Changeover Committee. Pre-2006 stamps denominated only in lira remained valid for use until 31 January 2008, and they could be exchanged for euro-denominated stamps until March 2008, after which they were demonetized. The dual currency stamps issued since December 2006 remain valid for use today along with euro-denominated stamps.

Prior to adopting the euro, Malta had demonetized stamps a number of times, for example all pre-1998 stamps were invalidated in December 2004.

=== Netherlands ===
Stamps of the Netherlands denominated in guilders were demonetized on 1 November 2013. It is not possible to exchange guilder stamps for ones denominated in euros.

=== Portugal ===
Portuguese stamps denominated in escudos were demonetized in 2002. All stamps issued since 15 March 1999 are valid for postage.

=== Spain ===
Spanish stamps denominated in pesetas were demonetized in 2002. All stamps issued since 8 January 2001 are valid for postage.

=== Vatican City ===
Stamps of the Vatican City denominated in lire are no longer valid for postage.

== Australia ==
The six self-governing Australian colonies that formed the Commonwealth of Australia on 1 January 1901 operated their own postal service and issued their own stamps. Under section 51(v) of the Commonwealth of Australia Constitution 1900, “postal, telegraphic, telephonic, and other like services” became a Commonwealth responsibility.

The Commonwealth's Postmaster-General's Department became effective on 1 March 1901 (this agency would be disaggregated on 1 July 1975 in part into the Australian Postal Commission trading as Australia Post). All then-current colony stamps which continued on sale became de facto Commonwealth stamps. Some of these stamps continued to be used for some time following the introduction in 1913 of the Commonwealth's uniform postage stamp series. These stamps continued to be valid for postage until 1968.

Pre-decimal Commonwealth stamps were valid till the 14th of February 1968, exactly two years after decimalisation.

== Hong Kong ==
In Hong Kong postage stamps have been demonetized only once, which happened because of the 1997 handover. Postage stamps from before 1997 bear the portrait of the king or queen of the United Kingdom (who at the time of handover was Queen Elizabeth II). Although there was already a series of politically neutral stamps issued (which did not bear the portrait of Queen Elizabeth II nor the words "Hong Kong, China", which appear on today's Hong Kong stamps) during the period of handover, Hongkong Post decided to let the old stamps bearing the portrait of Queen Elizabeth II be used for a few more years after the handover since there were some old stamps in the hands of Hong Kong people. Hong Kong people can also exchange those old stamps for new ones if they desire. After the transition period, those old stamps bearing the portrait of the king or queen of the United Kingdom were declared invalid and hence demonetized. The politically neutral stamps were not demonetized however. All stamps issued now bear the word "Hong Kong, China", as required by Basic Law.

As a side note, the Hong Kong dollar coins/notes that bear the portrait of the king or queen of the United Kingdom were never demonetized, however they will not be recirculated when the banks receive them, primarily because of their old age rather than sovereignty issue.

== Poland ==
The country of Poland has a very recent example of demonetization involving the stamp issues of 1990 to 1994. During this period of time, the face values of stamps due to hyperinflation gradually changed the face values to thousands of złoty. Commemorative stamp issues from 1995 to 1997 are also demonetized now as are certain selected issues as announced by the Polish Post Office.

When a newer stamp issue is demonetized a date is announced; however, if a postal patron in a small town has not been notified of the demonetization or a postal patron does not visit their local Post Office often, then Polish Post Office will accept their obsolete stamps for letter franking well after the demonetization date.

== United Kingdom ==
In the United Kingdom, earlier issues have been demonetized on several occasions. The first when stamps issued during the reigns of Queen Victoria and King Edward VII (issued 1840 to 1913) were declared no longer valid for postage, in 1915 and 1930 respectively. The second, early in 1970, when the stamps issued during the reigns of King George V, King Edward VIII and King George VI (issued 1911 to 1952) ceased to be valid. And the third after the introduction in 1971 of decimal currency, when all stamps with pre-decimalization values were demonetized effective 1 March 1972. Queen Elizabeth II £1 value stamps issued prior to 1971 are identifiable by design but remain valid for postage. All stamps issued in decimal currency remain valid at their face value, including those priced in half penny increments, except as noted below.

Pre-2022 definitive stamps were demonetized on 31 July 2023 (extended from the original deadline of 31 January). They can be submitted to Royal Mail to be exchanged for replacement stamps of the same value; these are new definitive stamps featuring 2D barcodes which were introduced in early 2022 to reduce counterfeiting and stamp reuse. Christmas stamps and special issue stamps were not demonetized, from 2022 onwards, Christmas stamps also feature 2D barcodes.

== United States ==
United States postage stamps have been demonetized only twice. The first time was in 1851, when the 5-cent and 10-cent stamps of the 1847 issue were declared invalid as of July 1 by the Act of March 3, 1851 reducing the normal letter rate from five to three cents. A few dozen covers are known that carry 1847 stamps after the demonetization date; as stamp usage was then still optional (it would not be made mandatory until 1855), the demonetization seems to have had relatively little impact.

The second, more serious, demonetization was prompted by the outbreak of the American Civil War in 1861. Southern post offices held substantial U.S. assets in the form of their stamp stocks, and the Confederates could theoretically have brought in some income by selling those stamps to private individuals in the North. Although in April 1861 John H. Reagan, postmaster of the CSA, ordered the offices in his charge to return their stamps to Washington D.C., few seem to have done so, and by June 1861 U.S. postmaster-general Montgomery Blair ordered the severance of postal ties and the production of new stamps. In August the stamps of the U.S. 1861 issue began to be distributed throughout the Union, along with orders that postmasters should offer to exchange old stamps for new for a period of six days after giving "public notice through the newspapers and otherwise". After the six-day period was over, that post office was not to recognize the old stamps as paying postage. In addition, postmasters were to accept letters with old stamps from other post offices until set dates, ranging from September 10 in the East, to November 1 from letters arriving from the Far West. (Later the periods were extended for an additional two months.) The process stretched over some months; the large cities in the East were exchanging stamps in the third week of August, while some small remote offices did not start until November. General confusion, combined with exhaustion of the new stamps at some post offices, led to some instances of the old stamps still being accepted on letters after demonetization, although surviving covers are rare.

The U.S. stamps of 1861, and all issued since then, continue to be valid on mail, except for stamps issued to denote payment for services no longer provided, such as special delivery stamps, special handling stamps, and certified mail stamps. In only one case has a series of U.S. stamps been accorded dual usage, the U.S. Parcel Post stamps of 1912–13.
