= Twenty pence (British coin) =

British decimal coin

- United Kingdom
- Value: £0.20 pound sterling
- Mass: 5.0 g
- Diameter: 21.4 mm
- Thickness: 1.7 mm
- Edge: Plain
- Composition: Cupro-nickel
- Years of minting: 1982–present

Obverse
- Design: Queen Elizabeth II
- Designer: Jody Clark
- Design date: 2015

Reverse
- Design: Segment of the Royal Shield
- Designer: Matthew Dent
- Design date: 2008

The British decimal twenty pence piece (20p) is a denomination of sterling coinage worth 1/5 of a pound, or twenty pence. Like the 50p coin, it is an equilateral curve heptagon. Its obverse has featured the profile of the British monarch since the coin's introduction on 9 June 1982.

As of March 2014 there were an estimated 2,765 million 20p coins in circulation, with an estimated face value of £553.025 million. Of this estimated number, between 50,000 and 200,000 coins are undated mule coins minted in 2008 after the dies for the old and new designs were accidentally mixed up during the minting process.

Beyond the usual commemorative versions, no 20 pence coins were minted for general circulation in 2017 but remain to start circulating again from 2019. This was because the concurrent introduction of the new version of the one pound coin had put enough 20 pence (and two pound) coins back into circulation, as people emptied coin jars primarily for the older one pound coin that was due to be withdrawn.

Twenty pence coins are legal tender for amounts up to the sum of £10 when offered in repayment of a debt; however, the coin's legal tender status is not normally relevant for everyday transactions.

== Background ==
The decimal twenty pence coin entered circulation on 9 June 1982, to ease transactions by reducing the number of ten pence coins in circulation: the introduction of the 20p coin to reduce the weight of coins in wallets was important at a time when cashless payments were not widespread and (for example) many individual food items cost less than one pound.

== Design ==
Original reverse: 1982–2008

=== Obverse ===
Four different obverses were used during the reign of Queen Elizabeth II. On coins minted before the 2008 redesign, the inscription is ELIZABETH II D.G.REG.F.D.. Coins minted after the 2008 redesign also have the year of minting on the obverse.

Like all the new decimal coins introduced in 1971, until 1984 the portrait of Queen Elizabeth II by Arnold Machin appeared on the obverse, in which the Queen wore the 'Girls of Great Britain and Ireland' Tiara.

Between 1985 and 1997 the portrait by Raphael Maklouf was used, in which the Queen wore the George IV State Diadem.

From 1998 to 2015 the portrait by Ian Rank-Broadley was used, again featuring the tiara, with a signature-mark IRB below the portrait.

From 2015 to 2022, 20 pence coins bore the portrait by Jody Clark.

=== Reverse ===
The original reverse of the coin, designed by William Gardner, and used from 1982 to 2008, was a crowned Tudor rose, with the numeral "20" below the rose, and TWENTY PENCE above the rose.

In August 2005 the Royal Mint launched a competition to find new reverse designs for all circulating coins apart from the £2 coin. The winner, announced in April 2008, was Matthew Dent, whose designs were gradually introduced into the circulating British coinage from mid-2008. The designs for the 1p, 2p, 5p, 10p, 20p and 50p coins depicted sections of the Royal Shield that formed the whole shield when placed together. The shield in its entirety was featured on the now-obsolete round £1 coin. The 20p coin depicted the meeting point of the second and fourth quarters of the shield, showing the lions rampant of Scotland and the lions passant of England. The date no longer appeared on the reverse of the coin, but instead was added to the obverse, where the lettering was adjusted so that the date could be included.

In October 2023 the King Charles III twenty-pence coin was presented; the coin's reverse features an Atlantic puffin.

== Dateless coin ==
An unusual accidental dateless version of the 20 pence was reported to be in circulation in June 2009, the first undated British coin to enter circulation in more than 300 years. This was the result of the production of a mule, i.e. a version of the coin with a non-standard combination of obverse and reverse face designs. The fault occurred as a result of the 2008 redesign of UK coinage, which moved the date on a 20 pence from the reverse to the obverse (Queen's head side), and a batch of coins were produced using the tooling for the obverse of the old design and the reverse of the new design. The Royal Mint estimated that between 50,000 and 200,000 entered circulation before the error was noticed. The Royal Mint stated that these coins were legal tender, although due to their rarity they are traded at above face value by collectors. Following publicity about the coins, they were initially traded on eBay for several thousand pounds, although an eBay spokesman was unable to confirm if an accepted winning bid of £7,100 for one coin had actually been transacted. In June 2011 they traded at around £100.

== Mintages ==
Number of twenty pence coins minted for circulation by year
| Year | Number minted | Portrait | Reverse |
|---|---|---|---|
| 1982 | 740,815,000 | Machin | Gardner |
| 1983 | 158,463,000 | Machin | Gardner |
| 1984 | 65,350,965 | Machin | Gardner |
| 1985 | 74,273,699 | Maklouf | Gardner |
| 1986 | 0 | Maklouf | Gardner |
| 1987 | 137,450,000 | Maklouf | Gardner |
| 1988 | 38,038,344 | Maklouf | Gardner |
| 1989 | 132,013,890 | Maklouf | Gardner |
| 1990 | 88,097,500 | Maklouf | Gardner |
| 1991 | 35,901,250 | Maklouf | Gardner |
| 1992 | 31,205,000 | Maklouf | Gardner |
| 1993 | 123,123,750 | Maklouf | Gardner |
| 1994 | 67,131,250 | Maklouf | Gardner |
| 1995 | 102,005,000 | Maklouf | Gardner |
| 1996 | 83,163,750 | Maklouf | Gardner |
| 1997 | 89,518,750 | Maklouf | Gardner |
| 1998 | 76,965,000 | Rank-Broadley | Gardner |
| 1999 | 73,478,750 | Rank-Broadley | Gardner |
| 2000 | 136,428,750 | Rank-Broadley | Gardner |
| 2001 | 148,122,500 | Rank-Broadley | Gardner |
| 2002 | 93,360,000 | Rank-Broadley | Gardner |
| 2003 | 153,383,750 | Rank-Broadley | Gardner |
| 2004 | 120,212,500 | Rank-Broadley | Gardner |
| 2005 | 124,488,750 | Rank-Broadley | Gardner |
| 2006 | 114,800,000 | Rank-Broadley | Gardner |
| 2007 | 117,075,000 | Rank-Broadley | Gardner |
| 2008 | 11,900,000 | Rank-Broadley | Gardner |
| 2008 | 115,022,000 | Rank-Broadley | Dent |
| 2009 | 121,625,300 | Rank-Broadley | Dent |
| 2010 | 112,875,500 | Rank-Broadley | Dent |
| 2011 | 191,625,000 | Rank-Broadley | Dent |
| 2012 | 69,650,030 | Rank-Broadley | Dent |
| 2013 | 66,325,000 | Rank-Broadley | Dent |
| 2014 | 173,775,000 | Rank-Broadley | Dent |
| 2015 | 63,175,000 | Rank-Broadley | Dent |
| 2015 | 131,250,000 | Clark | Dent |
| 2016 | 212,625,000 | Clark | Dent |
| 2017 | 0 | Clark | Dent |
| 2018 | 0 | Clark | Dent |
| 2019 | 125,125,000 | Clark | Dent |
| 2020 | 32,725,000 | Clark | Dent |
| 2021 | 19,600,000 | Clark | Dent |
| 2022 | 42,875,000 | Clark | Dent |
| 2023 | 525,000 | Jennings | The Royal Mint |

Mint sets have been produced since 1982; where mintages on or after that date indicate '0', there are examples contained within those sets.
