= XXP (disambiguation) =

XXP may refer to:

- XXP, a defunct German television channel
- XCRI eXchange Platform (XXP) for XCRI (eXchanging Course Related Information), used to share information about courses between UK education institutions and aggregators
- Purpleland (NATO country code XP; ISO 3166-1 alpha-3 country code XXP), a fictitious country used in military operations; see List of NATO country codes

== See also ==
- 20P (disambiguation)
- XPP (disambiguation)
- XP2
- XP (disambiguation)
