= Fifty pence (British coin) =

British decimal coin – half of one pound

- United Kingdom
- Value: £0.50 pound sterling
- Mass: (1997–pres.) 8.0 g; (1969–1994) 13.5 g
- Diameter: (1997–pres.) 27.3 mm; (1969–1994) 30.0 mm
- Thickness: (1997–pres.) 1.78 mm; (1969–1994) 2.5 mm
- Edge: Plain
- Composition: Cupro-nickel
- Years of minting: 1969–present

Obverse
- Design: Queen Elizabeth II
- Designer: Jody Clark
- Design date: 2015
- Design discontinued: 2022

Reverse
- Design: Segment of the Royal Shield
- Designer: Matthew Dent
- Design date: 2008

The British decimal fifty pence piece (50p) is a denomination of sterling coinage worth 1/2 of a pound, or fifty pence. Its obverse has featured the profile of the current British monarch since the coin's introduction in 1969. It was introduced as a decimal replacement for the ten shilling banknote, which was also valued at half of a pound. As of November 2024, six different royal portraits have been used.

As of March 2013 there were an estimated 920 million 50p coins in circulation. The coin has proved popular with coin collectors, leading to numerous differing designs for both commemorative and circulating coins.

Fifty pence coins minted after 1996 are legal tender for amounts up to the sum of £10 when offered in repayment of a debt; however, the coin's legal tender status is not normally relevant for everyday transactions.

== History ==
In 1967 the Deputy Master of the Royal Mint approached the Decimal Currency Board to ask for their advice on the introduction of a new coin. The 10-shilling note then in use was lasting only five months, and it had been suggested that a coin, which could last fifty years, would be more economical. The problem with this was that all coins are arranged in "tiers", each coin in a tier having the same weight-to-value ratio so that a bag of mixed coins could be weighed to ascertain the value so long as they were all bronze, all silver, etc. Each coin was identified within its tier by its size and each tier had to be capable of being identified by sight and touch. This was achieved in the then-existing sets by the use of different materials ("bronze", "brass" and "silver") with the bronze coins having plain rims, the nickel-brass threepenny bit being 12-sided and the silver coins having milled rims. If the 10-shilling coin were to be made in the same tier as the silver coins, it would have to be twice the weight of the Crown (then and now only in use for commemorative coins) and it was generally agreed that that would make it very unpopular and expensive. It would therefore have to be in a new tier of its own.

The Mint could not find a suitable metal which was sufficiently different in colour to the existing coins and which would not tarnish. This last point was thought to be important because the new coin would be the most valuable coin in general circulation in the world (equivalent to £7.97 in 2025). It therefore had to be a different shape; various methods had been used overseas to overcome this problem, but none were without drawbacks. A hole through the coin did unacceptable things to the Queen's head (a legal requirement on British coins), and wavy-edged, flat-edged or square coins could not be used in the coin-handling machinery which was then coming into increasing use in industry, banking and vending. To be used in a vending or sorting machine a coin would have to roll under gravity and be capable of being measured without being presented in a special way; in other words it needed a constant breadth at whichever angle it was measured.

The Technical Member (and the only engineer) on the Decimal Currency Board was Hugh Conway, at that time President of the Institution of Mechanical Engineers and Managing Director of Bristol Siddeley Engines, Bristol. He had found in a mathematical textbook a formula for a non-circular shape of constant breadth and asked the design office at Patchway, near Bristol, which normally worked on the engines for aircraft such as Concorde, Vulcan and Harrier to draw out the shape. However, this turned out to be a wavy-edged form with re-entrant sides which would not roll and which could not be measured easily. A designer, Colin Lewis, suggested a much simpler shape which in its basic form is an equilateral triangle with a small circle centred on each apex and with a larger circular arc centred on each apex but tangential to each of the two opposite small circles. Wherever it was measured, the breadth of this shape was one small radius plus one large radius. (The small radius was not strictly necessary to the geometry, but made the shape more practical by removing inconvenient sharp points and reducing the rate of wear, and therefore change of size, in handling.) The number of corners could be any odd number greater than one. A drawing was made to illustrate the proposal, which was accepted by Hugh Conway. He chose seven sides as a compromise between too radical a shape, which might not be acceptable to the public, and having too many sides, which would make a shape visually difficult to differentiate from a circle. The shape was drawn out by a designer, Ray Gooding, at ten times full size and samples made from stainless steel by the Model Shop, together with a section of perspex channel with a bend to demonstrate that the "coin" would roll around corners and drop through gauging slots. Prototype coins were produced with the legend "50" and a rim to the coin by photo-chemical etching from a master drawn by Ray Gooding, since it had already been decided that the new coin would be the first coin of the new Decimal series. As the coin was released before Decimal Day it was initially worth 10/- (and therefore 120d).

When the Decimal Currency Board met, none of the other members had any suggestion to make, so when the samples were produced the idea was accepted without opposition.

In the 1990s, the coin was made lighter and thinner due to inflation, with the first new coins minted in 1997. The coins had been 13.5 grams (0.48 oz), and were reduced to 8 grams (0.28 oz). The older coins were demonetised and removed from circulation. Face designs remained unchanged.

The shape of the original 50p coin was also used for the 20p coin, introduced in 1982, but in a smaller size.

== Design ==
It was the first seven-sided coin in the world. However, there was some confusion and resistance to the new shape after its release on 14 October 1969, where the coins were mistaken for the decimal 10p and half crowns, which were both round. A group of "Anti-Heptagonists" regarded the coin as 'ugly' and 'an insult to our sovereign whose image it bears'. Geometrically, the shape of the coin forms an equilateral-curve heptagon, or Reuleaux polygon, a curve of constant width, meaning that the diameter is constant across any bisection.

=== Obverse (Heads) ===
For Queen Elizabeth II, four different obverses have been used. In all cases, the inscription is ELIZABETH II D.G.REG.F.D. 2013, where 2013 is replaced by the year of minting; some additionally has the denomination, FIFTY PENCE, before the year (as these coins omit the denomination on the reverse entirely).

As with all new decimal currency, until 1984 the portrait of Queen Elizabeth II by Arnold Machin appeared on the obverse, in which the Queen wears the 'Girls of Great Britain and Ireland' Tiara.

Between 1985 and 1997 the portrait by Raphael Maklouf was used, in which the Queen wears the George IV State Diadem.

From 1998 to 2015 the portrait by Ian Rank-Broadley was used, again featuring the tiara, with a signature-mark IRB below the portrait. In 2008 the obverse design was rotated, to match the new reverse design which is displayed with the heptagon point down rather than point up.

From 2015 to 2022, coins bearing the portrait by Jody Clark were issued, which again featured the Diadem.

On 3 October 2022, a commemorative 50p coin was released that was the first to carry the portrait of King Charles III following the death of Elizabeth II. The coin, planned both as part of a commemorative set and for general circulation, featured a copy of the design used on the crown (five-shilling piece) released in 1953 to commemorate the Queen's coronation. The portrait of the King was undertaken by Martin Jennings.

=== Reverse (Tails) ===
Standard reverse design used 1982–2008, point-up orientation. This coin was minted in 1982 and is the larger size used before 1995.

The reverse of the coin, designed by Christopher Ironside, and used from 1969 to 2008, is a seated Britannia alongside a lion, holding an olive branch in her left hand and a trident in her right, accompanied by either NEW PENCE (1969–1981) or FIFTY PENCE (1982–2008) above Britannia, with the numeral 50 underneath the seated figure. His original but unused design, of the Royal Arms with supporters was released as a variation in 2013.

In August 2005 the Royal Mint launched a competition to find new reverse designs for all circulating coins apart from the £2 coin. The winner, announced in April 2008, was Matthew Dent, whose designs were gradually introduced into the circulating British coinage from mid-2008. The designs for the 1p, 2p, 5p, 10p, 20p and 50p coins depict sections of the Royal Shield that form the whole shield when placed together. The shield in its entirety was featured on the now-obsolete round £1 coin. The 50p coin depicts the lowest point of the Shield, with the words FIFTY PENCE below the point of the shield. The coin's obverse remains unchanged.

In October 2023 the King Charles III fifty-pence coin was presented; the coin features an Atlantic salmon.

== Variations ==
In addition to the standard designs there have been several variant reverse designs used on the 50p coin to commemorate important events. These are summarised in the table below.

Year on coin	Event	Design	Designer	Mintage
1973	United Kingdom's accession to the European Economic Community	The inscription "50 PENCE" and the date of the year, surrounded by nine hands, symbolising the nine members of the Community, clasping one another in a mutual gesture of trust, assistance and friendship	David Wynne	89,775,000
1992–93	United Kingdom's Presidency of the Council of Ministers and the completion of the Single European Market	A representation of a table on which are placed twelve stars, linked by a network of lines to each other and also to twelve chairs around the table, on one of which appear the letters "UK", and with the dates "1992" and "1993" above and the value "50 PENCE" below	Mary Milner Dickens	109,000
1994	50th Anniversary of the D-Day Landings	A design representing the Allied invasion force heading for Normandy and filling the sea and sky, together with the value "50 PENCE". This was the last commemorative coin in the original (larger) size.	John Mills	6,705,520
1998	United Kingdom's Presidency of the European Union, and the 25th Anniversary of the United Kingdom's accession to the European Economic Community	A celebratory arrangement of stars with the letters "EU" between the anniversary dates "1973" and "1998", and the value 50 PENCE below	John Mills	5,043,000
1998	50th Anniversary of the National Health Service	A pair of hands set against a pattern of radiating lines with the words "FIFTIETH ANNIVERSARY" and the value "50 PENCE", accompanied by the initials "NHS" which appear five times on the outer border	David Cornell	5,001,000
2000	150th Anniversary of the Public Libraries Act 1850	The turning pages of a book, the anniversary dates "1850" and "2000", and the value "50 PENCE", all above a classical library building on which appear the words "PUBLIC LIBRARIES" and, within the pediment, representations of compact discs	Mary Milner Dickens	11,263,000
2003	100th Anniversary of the formation of the Women's Social and Political Union	The figure of a suffragette chained to railings and holding a banner on which appear the letters WSPU, to the right a ballot paper marked with a cross and the words GIVE WOMEN THE VOTE, to the left the value 50 PENCE, and below and to the far right the anniversary dates 1903 and 2003	Mary Milner Dickens	3,124,030
2004	50th Anniversary of the first four-minute mile by Roger Bannister	The legs of a running athlete with a stylised stopwatch in the background and the value 50 PENCE below	James Butler	9,032,500
2005	250th Anniversary of Samuel Johnson's A Dictionary of the English Language	Entries from the Dictionary for the words FIFTY and PENCE, with the figure 50 above, and the inscription JOHNSON'S DICTIONARY 1755 below	Tom Phillips	17,649,000
2006	150th Anniversary of the institution of the Victoria Cross 1	Depiction of the obverse and reverse of a Victoria Cross with the date 29 JAN 1856 in the centre of the reverse of the Cross, the letters VC to the right and the value FIFTY PENCE below	Claire Aldridge	12,087,000
2006	150th Anniversary of the institution of the Victoria Cross 2	Depiction of a soldier carrying a wounded comrade with an outline of the Victoria Cross surrounded by a sunburst effect in the background	Clive Duncan	10,000,500
2007	Centenary of the Foundation of the Scouting Movement	A fleur-de-lis superimposed over a globe and surrounded by the inscription "BE PREPARED", the dates "1907" and "2007", and the denomination "FIFTY PENCE"	Kerry Jones	7,710,750
2009	250th Anniversary of the foundation of the Royal Botanic Gardens, Kew	A design showing the pagoda encircled by a vine and accompanied by the dates "1759" and "2009", with the word "KEW" at the base of the pagoda	Christopher Le Brun	210,000
2010	Celebrating 100 Years of Girlguiding UK	A hexagon made of six of the shamrock symbols of Girlguiding surrounded by the words "Celebrating 100 years of Girlguiding UK"	Jonathan Evans and Donna Hainan	7,410,090
2011	Celebrating 50 years of the work of the World Wide Fund for Nature (WWF)	Fifty small symbols showing the range of work of the WWF	Matthew Dent	3,400,000
2011	Great Britain hosting the 2012 Summer Olympics	29 different designs featuring Olympic and Paralympic sports	Various	See below
2013	Celebrating the 100th Anniversary of the birth of Christopher Ironside	The design which Ironside made for the 50p coin, showing the Coat of arms of the United Kingdom	Christopher Ironside	7,000,000
2013	Celebrating the 100th Anniversary of the birth of Benjamin Britten	The composer's name, written across musical bars; value is on the obverse for the first time.	Tom Phillips	5,300,000
2014	2014 Commonwealth Games in Glasgow	A cyclist and a runner, separated by the Flag of Scotland	Alex Loudon and Dan Flashman	6,500,000
2015	75th Anniversary of the Battle of Britain	Pilots running to their planes while planes fly above them	Gary Breeze	5,900,000
2016	Team GB	A swimmer with the Team GB logo for the 2016 Summer Olympics	Tim Sharp	6,400,000
2016	Battle of Hastings	King Harold hit in the eye with an arrow, a detail from the Bayeux Tapestry	John Bergdahl	6,700,000
2016	150th Anniversary of the birth of Beatrix Potter	A portrait of Beatrix Potter above along with her name, dates of her birth and death (1866–1943) and Peter Rabbit	Emma Noble	6,900,000
2016	Beatrix Potter: Peter Rabbit	An image of Peter Rabbit and his name	Emma Noble	9,700,000
2016	Beatrix Potter: Mrs. Tiggy-Winkle	An image of Mrs. Tiggy-Winkle and her name	Emma Noble	8,800,000
2016	Beatrix Potter: Squirrel Nutkin	An image of Squirrel Nutkin and his name	Emma Noble	5,000,000
2016	Beatrix Potter: Jemima Puddle-Duck	An image of Jemima Puddle-Duck and her name	Emma Noble	2,100,000
2017	300th Anniversary of Sir Isaac Newton's Gold-Standard Report	Stylised depiction of the Sun as the common focal point of three orbits of different planets	Aaron West	1,800,000
2017	Beatrix Potter: Peter Rabbit	An image of Peter Rabbit and the words "The Tale of Peter Rabbit"	Emma Noble	19,900,000
2017	Beatrix Potter: Mr. Jeremy Fisher	An image of Mr. Jeremy Fisher (a frog) and his name (June 2017)	Emma Noble	9,900,000
2017	Beatrix Potter: Tom Kitten	An image of Tom Kitten and his name (August 2017)	Emma Noble	9,500,000
2017	Beatrix Potter: Benjamin Bunny	An image of Benjamin Bunny and his name (September 2017)	Emma Noble	25,000,000
2018	100th Anniversary of the Representation of the People Act	An image of a crowd of voters, representing the change in suffrage triggered by the law	Stephen Taylor	9,000,000
2018	60th Anniversary of the publication of the first Paddington children's story book.	An image of Paddington Bear sitting inside Paddington Station	David Knapton	5,001,000
2018	Paddington at the Palace	An image of Paddington Bear holding the Union Flag while standing in front of Buckingham Palace	David Knapton	5,901,000
2018	Beatrix Potter: Peter Rabbit	An image of Peter Rabbit in his blue jacket eating carrots, and his name	Emma Noble	1,400,000
2018	Beatrix Potter: Flopsy Bunny	An image of Flopsy Bunny in her recognisable red cape and her name	Emma Noble	1,400,000
2018	Beatrix Potter: The Tailor of Gloucester	An image of a mouse sitting on a reel of thread, reading a newspaper and the words "The Tailor of Gloucester"	Emma Noble	3,900,000
2018	Beatrix Potter: Mrs Tittlemouse	An image of Mrs Tittlemouse the houseproud little mouse carrying her basket and her name above the image	Emma Noble	1,700,000
2019	160th Anniversary of the birth of Sir Arthur Conan Doyle	An image of Sherlock Holmes surrounded by the names of all the Sherlock Holmes books	Stephen Raw	8,602,000
2019	Paddington at The Tower of London	An image of Paddington Bear holding a marmalade sandwich whilst standing outside Tower of London	David Knapton	9,001,000
2019	Paddington at St Paul's Cathedral	An image of Paddington Bear raising his hat in front of St Paul's Cathedral	David Knapton	9,001,000
2020	Withdrawal of the United Kingdom from the European Union	The slogan "Peace, prosperity and friendship with all nations" in a calligraphic font, and the date "31 January 2020". (About a million coins bearing the date "31 October 2019" had to be shredded and melted down. Another version, bearing the date "29 March 2019", was planned for release, but was not issued.) The slogan does not use the Oxford comma which has drawn criticism.		10,001,000
2020	Diversity Built Britain	The slogan "Diversity Built Britain" in a calligraphic font on a structure composed of interconnected triangles	Dominique Evans	10,300,000
2022	The Platinum Jubilee of Her Majesty The Queen	A large number 70 with her Royal cypher	Osborne Ross	5,000,070
2022	50 years of Pride	Depicts five rainbows (symbol of the LGBTQ+ community) with words "PRIDE", "PROTEST", "VISIBILITY", "UNITY" and "EQUALITY"	Dominque Holmes	5,000,000
2022	Commemorating Her Majesty Queen Elizabeth II	King's Crown surrounded by four shields bearing the arms of Scotland, England and Ireland; and a thistle, rose, leek and shamrock. This is a copy of the Crown issued for her coronation. First to feature the new King Charles III obverse.	Edgar Fuller & Cecil Thomas	9,600,000
2023	Coronation of King Charles III	Exterior of Westminster Abbey, as well as the King's Royal Cypher	Natasha Jenkins	5,000,000

The following coins were produced by the Royal Mint as commemorative releases only, without being intended for release into circulation:

Year on coin	Event	Design	Designer	Mintage
2018	40th Anniversary of The Snowman	An image of The Snowman holding James' hand while flying over the snowy village by the sea, from the children's book illustrated by Raymond Briggs	Natasha Ratcliffe	170,705 BU Only
2019	20th Anniversary of The Gruffalo	An image of the Gruffalo, from the children's storybook written by Julia Donaldson and illustrated by Axel Scheffler	Magic Light Pictures	Unknown
2019	1st Anniversary of the death of Stephen Hawking	An image of a black hole and Hawking's formula describing the entropy of a black hole. First coin in the Innovation in Science series	Edwina Ellis	Unknown
2019	Beatrix Potter: Peter Rabbit	An image of Peter Rabbit and his name	Emma Noble	Unknown
2019	50 years of the 50 pence coin – British Culture Set	A re-issue of five of the most iconic designs— the original Britannia (1969) with NEW PENCE text and micro-engraved mint marks, first sub-four-minute mile (2004), Scouting (2007), Kew Gardens (2009), Girl Guides (2010). All have the new obverse with the year 2019.	Various	Unknown
2019	50 years of the 50 pence coin – British Military Set	A re-issue of five military designs – D-Day Landings (1994), Victoria Cross 1 (2006), Victoria Cross 2 (2006), Battle of Britain (2015), Battle of Hastings (2016). All have the new obverse with the year 2019.	Various	Unknown
2019	The Gruffalo and Mouse	An image of the Gruffalo and the mouse	Magic Light Pictures	Unknown
2019	30th Anniversary of "A Grand Day Out"	An image of Wallace and Gromit looking out of the porthole of their rocket	Nick Park	Unknown
2019	The Snowman	An image of The Snowman standing behind James. They are both in front of a mountainous landscape.	Snowman Enterprises	Unlimited
2020	Beatrix Potter: Peter Rabbit	An image of Peter Rabbit scrambling under Mr. McGregor's fence, and his name	Emma Noble	Unknown
2020	The Dinosauria Collection	Three designs recognising the British discovery of dinosaurs with images of the Megalosaurus, Iguanodon and Hylaeosaurus	Robert Nichols	Unknown
2020	100th Anniversary of the birth of Rosalind Franklin	An image of Photo 51. Second coin in the Innovation in Science series	David Knapton	Unknown
2020	95th anniversary of Winnie the Pooh	Three coins, with images of Winnie the Pooh, Christopher Robin and Piglet	Disney	Unknown
2020	The Snowman	James and the Snowman shown in an embrace	Robin Shaw	Unknown
2021	75th anniversary of the death of John Logie Baird	The design features key milestones from Baird's life, presented between the lines of transmission radiating from the centre of the coin. Third coin in the Innovation in Science series	Osborne Ross	Unknown
2021	50th Anniversary of decimalisation	An image of the pre-decimal coins of the United Kingdom prior to decimalisation, including the farthing, the half penny, the penny, threepence, sixpence, one-shilling and two-shilling coins, along with the words "1971 DECIMAL DAY" contained in the seven-sided shape of the fifty pence coin	Dominique Evans	Unknown
2021	The Dinosauria Collection	Three further designs recognising the British discovery of dinosaurs with images of the Temnodontosaurus, Plesiosaurus and Dimorphodon	Robert Nichols	Unknown
2021	Team GB	Depictions of equipment used for sports in the 2020 Summer Olympics. Some examples feature a 2020 date, due to the postponement of the games until 2021 due to the COVID-19 pandemic.	David Knapton	Unknown
2021	Winnie the Pooh and Friends	An image of Winnie the Pooh, Rabbit, Eeyore, Piglet and Tigger	The Walt Disney Company	Unknown
2021	150th Anniversary of the death of Charles Babbage	The fourth coin in the Innovation in Science series, featuring his name.	Nigel Tudman and Jas Bhamra	Unknown
2021	Winnie the Pooh: Owl	An image of Owl	The Walt Disney Company	Unknown
2021	100th Anniversary of the discovery of Insulin	An image of insulin crystals and its chemical formula. Fifth coin in the Innovation in Science series	Iris De La Torre	Unknown
2021	The Snowman	An image of James drawing the mouth on the Snowman	Robin Shaw	Unknown
2021	Winnie the Pooh: Tigger	An image of Tigger	The Walt Disney Company	Unknown
2022	2022 Commonwealth Games	An image of the iconic design of the Library of Birmingham and the words Birmingham 2022 Commonwealth Games	Natasha Preece	Unknown
2022	Winnie the Pooh: Eeyore	An image of Eeyore	The Walt Disney Company	Unknown
2022	Winnie the Pooh: Kanga and Roo	An image of Kanga and her joey Roo	Ernest Shepard	Unknown
2022	100th Anniversary of the BBC	An image of a globe surmounted with transmission arcs, and the words "100 YEARS OF OUR BBC. INFORM EDUCATE ENTERTAIN"	Henry Gray	Unknown

There are also other variants not listed here which were minted by other Mints, such as Pobjoy Mint

== Mintages ==
Number of fifty pence coins minted for circulation by year
Year	Number minted	Reverse	Portrait	Diameter (mm)
1968	0	Britannia	Machin	30.0
1969	188,400,000	Britannia	Machin	30.0
1970	19,461,500	Britannia	Machin	30.0
1971	0	Britannia	Machin	30.0
1972	0	Britannia	Machin	30.0
1973	89,775,000	EEC	Machin	30.0
1974	0	Britannia	Machin	30.0
1975	0	Britannia	Machin	30.0
1976	43,746,500	Britannia	Machin	30.0
1977	49,536,000	Britannia	Machin	30.0
1978	72,005,500	Britannia	Machin	30.0
1979	58,680,000	Britannia	Machin	30.0
1980	89,086,000	Britannia	Machin	30.0
1981	74,002,000	Britannia	Machin	30.0
1982	51,312,000	Britannia	Machin	30.0
1983	62,824,904	Britannia	Machin	30.0
1984	0	Britannia	Machin	30.0
1985	682,103	Britannia	Maklouf	30.0
1986	0	Britannia	Maklouf	30.0
1987	0	Britannia	Maklouf	30.0
1988	0	Britannia	Maklouf	30.0
1989	0	Britannia	Maklouf	30.0
1990	0	Britannia	Maklouf	30.0
1991	0	Britannia	Maklouf	30.0
1992	0	Britannia	Maklouf	30.0
1992	109,000	Single Market	Maklouf	30.0
1993	0	Britannia	Maklouf	30.0
1994	6,705,520	D-Day	Maklouf	30.0
1995	0	Britannia	Maklouf	30.0
1996	0	Britannia	Maklouf	30.0
1997	0	Britannia	Maklouf	30.0
1997	456,364,100	Britannia	Maklouf	27.3
1998	64,306,500	Britannia	Rank-Broadley	27.3
1998	5,043,000	EU	Rank-Broadley	27.3
1998	5,001,000	NHS	Rank-Broadley	27.3
1999	24,905,000	Britannia	Rank-Broadley	27.3
2000	27,915,500	Britannia	Rank-Broadley	27.3
2000	11,263,000	Public Libraries Act	Rank-Broadley	27.3
2001	84,998,500	Britannia	Rank-Broadley	27.3
2002	23,907,500	Britannia	Rank-Broadley	27.3
2003	23,583,000	Britannia	Rank-Broadley	27.3
2003	3,124,030	Suffragettes	Rank-Broadley	27.3
2004	35,315,500	Britannia	Rank-Broadley	27.3
2004	9,032,500	Roger Bannister	Rank-Broadley	27.3
2005	25,363,500	Britannia	Rank-Broadley	27.3
2005	17,649,000	Dictionary	Rank-Broadley	27.3
2006	24,567,000	Britannia	Rank-Broadley	27.3
2006	12,087,000	VC – award	Rank-Broadley	27.3
2006	10,000,500	VC – heroic acts	Rank-Broadley	27.3
2007	11,200,000	Britannia	Rank-Broadley	27.3
2007	7,710,750	Scouting	Rank-Broadley	27.3
2008	3,500,000	Britannia	Rank-Broadley	27.3
2008	22,747,000	Royal Shield	Rank-Broadley	27.3
2009	0	Royal Shield	Rank-Broadley	27.3
2009	210,000	Kew Gardens	Rank-Broadley	27.3
2010	0	Royal Shield	Rank-Broadley	27.3
2010	7,410,090	Girl Guiding	Rank-Broadley	27.3
2011	0	Royal Shield	Rank-Broadley	27.3
2011	53,272,613	Olympic games series	Rank-Broadley	27.3
2011	3,400,000	WWF	Rank-Broadley	27.3
2012	32,300,030	Royal Shield	Rank-Broadley	27.3
2013	10,301,000	Royal Shield	Rank-Broadley	27.3
2013	7,000,000	Christopher Ironside	Rank-Broadley	27.3
2013	5,300,000	Benjamin Britten	Rank-Broadley	27.3
2014	49,001,000	Royal Shield	Rank-Broadley	27.3
2014	6,500,000	Glasgow 2014	Rank-Broadley	27.3
2015	20,101,000	Royal Shield	Rank-Broadley	27.3
2015	39,300,000	Royal Shield	Clark	27.3
2015	5,900,000	Battle of Britain	Clark	27.3
2016	0	Royal Shield	Clark	27.3
2016	9,700,000	Beatrix Potter: Peter Rabbit	Clark	27.3
2016	8,800,000	Beatrix Potter: Mrs. Tiggy-Winkle	Clark	27.3
2016	6,900,000	Beatrix Potter Portrait	Clark	27.3
2016	6,700,000	Battle of Hastings	Clark	27.3
2016	6,400,000	Team GB	Clark	27.3
2016	5,000,000	Beatrix Potter: Squirrel Nutkin	Clark	27.3
2016	2,100,000	Beatrix Potter: Jemima Puddle-Duck	Clark	27.3
2017	1,800,000	Royal Shield	Clark	27.3
2017	25,000,000	Beatrix Potter: Benjamin Bunny	Clark	27.3
2017	19,900,000	Beatrix Potter: Peter Rabbit	Clark	27.3
2017	9,900,000	Beatrix Potter: Jeremy Fisher	Clark	27.3
2017	9,500,000	Beatrix Potter: Tom Kitten	Clark	27.3
2017	1,801,500	Isaac Newton	Clark	27.3
2018	0	Royal Shield	Clark	27.3
2018	9,000,000	Representation of the People Act	Clark	27.3
2018	5,901,000	Paddington at Buckingham Palace	Clark	27.3
2018	5,001,000	Paddington at The Station	Clark	27.3
2018	3,900,000	Beatrix Potter: The Tailor of Gloucester	Clark	27.3
2018	1,700,000	Beatrix Potter: Mrs Tittlemouse	Clark	27.3
2018	1,400,000	Beatrix Potter: Flopsy Bunny	Clark	27.3
2018	1,400,000	Beatrix Potter: Peter Rabbit	Clark	27.3
2019	122,000,000	Royal Shield	Clark	27.3
2019	9,001,000	Paddington at the Tower	Clark	27.3
2019	9,001,000	Paddington at St. Pauls Cathedral	Clark	27.3
2019	8,602,000	Sherlock Holmes	Clark	27.3
2020	46,540,375	Royal Shield	Clark	27.3
2020	10,300,000	Diversity	Clark	27.3
2020	10,001,000	Withdrawal from the European Union	Clark	27.3
2021	0	Royal Shield	Clark	27.3
2022	9,500,000	Royal Shield	Clark	27.3
2022	5,000,070	Platinum Jubilee	Clark	27.3
2022	5,000,000	UK Pride	Clark	27.3
2022	9,600,000	Queen Elizabeth Memorial	Jennings	27.3
2023	200,000	Atlantic Salmon	Jennings	27.3
2023	5,000,000	Coronation of King Charles III	Jennings	27.3
2024	0	Atlantic Salmon	Jennings	27.3
2025	2,000,000	Atlantic Salmon	Jennings	27.3

Number of fifty pence Olympic Games series coins minted in 2011 for circulation
Reverse	Number minted
Aquatics (swimmer)	2,179,000
Archery	3,345,500
Athletics (high jumper)	2,224,000
Badminton	2,133,500
Basketball	1,748,000
Boccia	2,166,000
Boxing	2,148,500
Canoeing	2,166,500
Cycling	2,090,500
Equestrian	2,142,500
Fencing	2,115,500
Football	1,125,500
Goalball	1,615,500
Gymnastics	1,720,813
Handball	1,676,500
Hockey	1,773,500
Judo	1,161,500
Modern Pentathlon	1,689,500
Rowing	1,717,300
Sailing	1,749,500
Shooting	1,656,500
Table Tennis	1,737,500
Taekwondo	1,664,000
Tennis	1,454,000
Triathlon	1,163,500
Volleyball	2,133,500
Weightlifting	1,879,500
Wheelchair Rugby	1,765,500
Wrestling	1,129,500

Mint sets have been produced since 1982; where mintages on or after that date indicate 'none' or 'Proof only', there are examples contained within those sets.

Preceded by Ten shilling note	Fifty pence coin 1969 – present	Succeeded by Incumbent
