= Five pence (British coin) =

Coin of the United Kingdom

- United Kingdom
- Value: £0.05 pound sterling
- Mass: (1968–1990) 5.65 g (1990–present) 3.25 g
- Diameter: (1968–1990) 23.59 mm (1990–present) 18.00 mm
- Thickness: (Cupro-nickel) 1.7 mm (Steel) 1.89 mm
- Edge: Milled
- Composition: Cupronickel (1968–2010); Nickel-plated steel (2011–)
- Years of minting: 1968–present

Obverse
- Design: Queen Elizabeth II
- Designer: Jody Clark
- Design date: 2015

Reverse
- Design: Segment of the Royal Shield
- Designer: Matthew Dent
- Design date: 2008

The British decimal five pence piece (5p) is a denomination of sterling coinage worth 1/20 of a pound, or five pence. Its obverse has featured the profile of the British monarch since the coin’s introduction on 23 April 1968, replacing the shilling in preparation for decimalisation in 1971. It remained the same size as the one shilling coin, which also remained legal tender, until a smaller version was introduced in June 1990 with the older coins being withdrawn on 31 December 1990.

The five pence coin was originally minted from cupro-nickel (75% Cu, 25% Ni), but since 2011 it has been minted in nickel-plated steel due to the increasing price of metal. From January 2013, the Royal Mint began a programme to gradually remove the previous cupro-nickel coins from circulation, replacing them with nickel-plated steel versions.

In March 2014, an estimated 3,847 million 5p coins were in circulation with an estimated face value of £192.370 million.

Five pence coins minted after 1990 are legal tender up to the sum of £5 when offered in repayment of a debt; however, the coin's legal tender status is not normally relevant for everyday transactions.

== Design ==
Thistle design reverse: 1982–2008

The original reverse of the coin, designed by Christopher Ironside, and used from 1968 to 2008, is a crowned thistle (formally, The Badge of Scotland, a thistle royally crowned), with the numeral "5" below the thistle, and either NEW PENCE (1968–1981) or FIVE PENCE (1982–2008) above the thistle.

To date, three different obverses have been used. In all cases, the inscription is ELIZABETH II D.G.REG.F.D. 2013, where 2013 is replaced by the year of minting. In the original design, both sides of the coin are encircled by dots, a common feature on coins, known as beading.

As with all new decimal currency, until 1984 the portrait of Queen Elizabeth II by Arnold Machin appeared on the obverse, in which the Queen wears the 'Girls of Great Britain and Ireland' Tiara.

Between 1985 and 1997, the portrait by Raphael Maklouf was used, in which the Queen wears the George IV State Diadem.

On 27 June 1990, a reduced-size version of the five pence coin was introduced. The older, larger coins were withdrawn on 31 December 1990. The design remained unchanged.

From 1998 to 2015, the portrait by Ian Rank-Broadley was used, again featuring the tiara, with a signature-mark IRB below the portrait.

In June 2015, coins bearing the portrait by Jody Clark were introduced into circulation.

In August 2005, the Royal Mint launched a competition to find new reverse designs for all circulating coins apart from the £2 coin. The winner, announced in April 2008, was Matthew Dent, whose designs were gradually introduced into the circulating British coinage from mid-2008. The designs for the 1p, 2p, 5p, 10p, 20p and 50p coins depict sections of the Royal Shield that form the whole shield when placed together. The shield in its entirety was featured on the now-obsolete round £1 coin. The 5p coin depicts the centre of the Royal shield, showing the meeting point of the four quarters. The coin's obverse remains largely unchanged, but the beading (the ring of dots around the coin's circumference), which no longer features on the coin's reverse, has also been removed from the obverse.

In October 2023 the King Charles III five-pence coin, featuring an oak leaf with acorns, was presented.

== Mintages ==
Number of five pence coins minted for circulation by year
| Year | Number minted | Composition | Diameter (mm) | Portrait | Reverse |
|---|---|---|---|---|---|
| 1968 | 98,868,250 | Cupro-nickel | 23.59 | Machin | Ironside |
| 1969 | 120,270,000 | Cupro-nickel | 23.59 | Machin | Ironside |
| 1970 | 225,948,525 | Cupro-nickel | 23.59 | Machin | Ironside |
| 1971 | 81,783,475 | Cupro-nickel | 23.59 | Machin | Ironside |
| 1972 | 0 | Cupro-nickel | 23.59 | Machin | Ironside |
| 1973 | 0 | Cupro-nickel | 23.59 | Machin | Ironside |
| 1974 | 0 | Cupro-nickel | 23.59 | Machin | Ironside |
| 1975 | 141,539,000 | Cupro-nickel | 23.59 | Machin | Ironside |
| 1976 | 0 | Cupro-nickel | 23.59 | Machin | Ironside |
| 1977 | 24,308,000 | Cupro-nickel | 23.59 | Machin | Ironside |
| 1978 | 61,094,000 | Cupro-nickel | 23.59 | Machin | Ironside |
| 1979 | 155,456,000 | Cupro-nickel | 23.59 | Machin | Ironside |
| 1980 | 220,566,000 | Cupro-nickel | 23.59 | Machin | Ironside |
| 1981 | 0 | Cupro-nickel | 23.59 | Machin | Ironside |
| 1982 | 0 | Cupro-nickel | 23.59 | Machin | Ironside |
| 1983 | 0 | Cupro-nickel | 23.59 | Machin | Ironside |
| 1984 | 0 | Cupro-nickel | 23.59 | Machin | Ironside |
| 1985 | 0 | Cupro-nickel | 23.59 | Maklouf | Ironside |
| 1986 | 0 | Cupro-nickel | 23.59 | Maklouf | Ironside |
| 1987 | 48,220,000 | Cupro-nickel | 23.59 | Maklouf | Ironside |
| 1988 | 120,744,610 | Cupro-nickel | 23.59 | Maklouf | Ironside |
| 1989 | 101,406,000 | Cupro-nickel | 23.59 | Maklouf | Ironside |
| 1990 | 1,634,976,005 | Cupro-nickel | 18.00 | Maklouf | Ironside |
| 1991 | 724,979,000 | Cupro-nickel | 18.00 | Maklouf | Ironside |
| 1992 | 453,173,500 | Cupro-nickel | 18.00 | Maklouf | Ironside |
| 1993 | 0 | Cupro-nickel | 18.00 | Maklouf | Ironside |
| 1994 | 93,602,000 | Cupro-nickel | 18.00 | Maklouf | Ironside |
| 1995 | 183,384,000 | Cupro-nickel | 18.00 | Maklouf | Ironside |
| 1996 | 302,902,000 | Cupro-nickel | 18.00 | Maklouf | Ironside |
| 1997 | 236,596,000 | Cupro-nickel | 18.00 | Maklouf | Ironside |
| 1998 | 217,376,000 | Cupro-nickel | 18.00 | Rank-Broadley | Ironside |
| 1999 | 195,490,000 | Cupro-nickel | 18.00 | Rank-Broadley | Ironside |
| 2000 | 388,512,000 | Cupro-nickel | 18.00 | Rank-Broadley | Ironside |
| 2001 | 337,930,000 | Cupro-nickel | 18.00 | Rank-Broadley | Ironside |
| 2002 | 219,258,000 | Cupro-nickel | 18.00 | Rank-Broadley | Ironside |
| 2003 | 333,230,000 | Cupro-nickel | 18.00 | Rank-Broadley | Ironside |
| 2004 | 271,810,000 | Cupro-nickel | 18.00 | Rank-Broadley | Ironside |
| 2005 | 236,212,000 | Cupro-nickel | 18.00 | Rank-Broadley | Ironside |
| 2006 | 317,697,000 | Cupro-nickel | 18.00 | Rank-Broadley | Ironside |
| 2007 | 246,720,000 | Cupro-nickel | 18.00 | Rank-Broadley | Ironside |
| 2008 | 92,880,000 | Cupro-nickel | 18.00 | Rank-Broadley | Ironside |
| 2008 | 165,172,000 | Cupro-nickel | 18.00 | Rank-Broadley | Dent |
| 2009 | 132,960,300 | Cupro-nickel | 18.00 | Rank-Broadley | Dent |
| 2010 | 396,245,500 | Cupro-nickel | 18.00 | Rank-Broadley | Dent |
| 2011 | 50,400,000 | Nickel-plated steel | 18.00 | Rank-Broadley | Dent |
| 2012 | 339,802,350 | Nickel-plated steel | 18.00 | Rank-Broadley | Dent |
| 2013 | 378,800,750 | Nickel-plated steel | 18.00 | Rank-Broadley | Dent |
| 2014 | 885,004,520 | Nickel-plated steel | 18.00 | Rank-Broadley | Dent |
| 2015 | 163,000,000 | Nickel-plated steel | 18.00 | Rank-Broadley | Dent |
| 2015 | 536,600,000 | Nickel-plated steel | 18.00 | Clark | Dent |
| 2016 | 305,740,000 | Nickel-plated steel | 18.00 | Clark | Dent |
| 2017 | 220,515,000 | Nickel-plated steel | 18.00 | Clark | Dent |
| 2018 | 0 | Nickel-plated steel | 18.00 | Clark | Dent |
| 2019 | 92,800,000 | Nickel-plated steel | 18.00 | Clark | Dent |
| 2020 | 49,200,000 | Nickel-plated steel | 18.00 | Clark | Dent |
| 2021 | 28,000,000 | Nickel-plated steel | 18.00 | Clark | Dent |
| 2022 | 42,800,000 | Nickel-plated steel | 18.00 | Clark | Dent |
| 2023 | 32,400,000 | Nickel-plated steel | 18.00 | Jennings | The Royal Mint |
| 2024 | 0 | Nickel-plated steel | 18.00 | Jennings | The Royal Mint |

Mint sets have been produced since 1982; where mintages on or after that date indicate '0', there are examples contained within those sets.
