= Two pence (British decimal coin) =

British decimal coin

- United Kingdom
- Value: £0.02 pound sterling
- Mass: 7.12 g
- Diameter: 25.9 mm
- Thickness: (Bronze) 1.85 mm; (Steel) 2.03 mm
- Edge: Plain
- Composition: Bronze (1971–1992, 1998); Copper-plated steel (1992–2021)
- Years of minting: 1971–2021

Obverse
- Design: Queen Elizabeth II
- Designer: Jody Clark
- Design date: 2015

Reverse
- Design: Segment of the Royal Shield
- Designer: Matthew Dent
- Design date: 2008

The British decimal two pence piece (2p) is a denomination of sterling coinage equalling 1/50 of a pound, or two pence. Since the coin's introduction on 15 February 1971, the year British currency was decimalised, its obverse has featured four profiles of Queen Elizabeth II. In 2008 the design on its reverse changed from the original depiction of a plume of ostrich feathers with a coronet to a segment of the Royal Shield.

The two pence coin was originally minted from bronze, but changed in 1992 to copper-plated steel.

As of March 2014 there were an estimated 6.55 billion 2p coins in circulation, corresponding to a value of £131 million.

Decimal two pence coins are legal tender for amounts only up to the sum of 20p when offered in repayment of a debt; however, the coin's legal tender status is not normally relevant for everyday transactions.

== Composition ==
From its first minting in 1971 until 1992, two pence coins were made from bronze. In 1992, this was changed to copper-plated steel because of the increasing price of copper used to make bronze. Both the bronze and steel versions were made in 1992 as it was the transition year, however in 1998 a small quantity of bronze two pences were made alongside the standard copper-plated steel. There were 98,676,000 bronze 2p coins from that year, and 115,154,000 in copper-plated steel.

By May 2006 the pre-1992 (97% copper) coins contained 3p worth of copper each. In May 2006, about 2.55 billion such coins remained in circulation, and the Royal Mint warned that tampering with coinage is illegal in the UK. During 2008, the value of copper fell dramatically from these peaks.

== Design ==
Reverse: 1982–2008

=== Reverse ===
The original reverse of the coin, designed by Christopher Ironside, and used from 1971 to 2008, is the Badge of the Prince of Wales: a plume of ostrich feathers within a coronet, above the German motto ICH DIEN ("I serve"). The numeral "2" is written below the badge, and either NEW PENCE (1971–1981) or TWO PENCE (from 1982) is written above. A small number of 1983 mintage coins exist with the "New Pence" wording. It was originally planned that an alternative version of the 2p would be minted with a design representing Northern Ireland; these plans never came to fruition. The same design was also re-cut in 1993 producing two minor varieties for that year.

In August 2005 the Royal Mint launched a competition to find new reverse designs for all circulating coins apart from the £2 coin. The winner, announced in April 2008, was Matthew Dent, whose designs were gradually introduced into the circulating British coinage from mid-2008. The designs for the 1p, 2p, 5p, 10p, 20p and 50p coins depict sections of the Royal Shield that form the whole shield when placed together. The shield in its entirety was featured on the now-obsolete round £1 coin. The re-designed 2p coin depicts the second quarter of the shield, showing the Lion Rampant from the Royal Banner of Scotland, with the words TWO PENCE above.

The beading was removed from both sides of the coin in the 2008 re-design.

In October 2023 the King Charles III two-pence coin was presented; the reverse features a red squirrel. However, it has not entered circulation; the Treasury has not ordered any 2p coins to be minted since 2017, except for 117.7 million coins in 2021, and according to the National Audit Office in 2020, they did not expect to order any mintings for a decade because they hold a large stockpile of existing coins and demand for them is declining.

=== Obverse ===
Five different obverses were used during the reign of Queen Elizabeth II: four different portraits and the removal of the beaded border in 2008. In all cases, the inscription is ELIZABETH II D.G.REG.F.D. 2013, where 2013 is replaced by the year of minting. In the original design both sides of the coin are encircled by dots, a common feature on coins, known as beading.

Four different portraits of Elizabeth II were used on the coin:

- As with all new decimal currency, until 1984 the portrait of Elizabeth II by Arnold Machin appeared on the obverse, in which the Queen wears the 'Girls of Great Britain and Ireland' Tiara.
- Between 1985 and 1997 the portrait by Raphael Maklouf was used, in which the Queen wears the George IV State Diadem. In 1992 the metal used in minting this coin was switched from bronze to copper-plated steel, with a single year of using both alloys in 1998.
- From 1998 to 2015 the portrait by Ian Rank-Broadley was used, again featuring the tiara, with a signature-mark IRB below the portrait.
- From 2015 to 2022, coins bore the portrait by Jody Clark.

== Mintages ==
Number of two pence coins minted for circulation by year
Year	Number minted	Composition	Portrait	Reverse
1971	1,454,856,250	Bronze	Machin	Ironside
1972	In sets only	Bronze	Machin	Ironside
1973	In sets only	Bronze	Machin	Ironside
1974	In sets only	Bronze	Machin	Ironside
1975	145,545,000	Bronze	Machin	Ironside
1976	181,379,000	Bronze	Machin	Ironside
1977	109,281,000	Bronze	Machin	Ironside
1978	189,658,000	Bronze	Machin	Ironside
1979	260,200,000	Bronze	Machin	Ironside
1980	408,527,000	Bronze	Machin	Ironside
1981	353,191,000	Bronze	Machin	Ironside
1982	In sets only	Bronze	Machin	Ironside
1983	In sets only	Bronze	Machin	Ironside
1984	In sets only	Bronze	Machin	Ironside
1985	107,113,000	Bronze	Maklouf	Ironside
1986	168,967,500	Bronze	Maklouf	Ironside
1987	218,100,750	Bronze	Maklouf	Ironside
1988	419,889,000	Bronze	Maklouf	Ironside
1989	359,226,000	Bronze	Maklouf	Ironside
1990	204,499,700	Bronze	Maklouf	Ironside
1991	86,625,250	Bronze	Maklouf	Ironside
1992	102,247,000	Bronze	Maklouf	Ironside
1992	102,247,000	Copper-plated steel	Maklouf	Ironside
1993	235,674,000	Copper-plated steel	Maklouf	Ironside
1994	531,628,000	Copper-plated steel	Maklouf	Ironside
1995	124,482,000	Copper-plated steel	Maklouf	Ironside
1996	296,278,000	Copper-plated steel	Maklouf	Ironside
1997	496,116,000	Copper-plated steel	Maklouf	Ironside
1998	98,676,000	Bronze	Rank-Broadley	Ironside
1998	115,154,000	Copper-plated steel	Rank-Broadley	Ironside
1999	353,816,000	Copper-plated steel	Rank-Broadley	Ironside
2000	563,659,000	Copper-plated steel	Rank-Broadley	Ironside
2001	551,880,000	Copper-plated steel	Rank-Broadley	Ironside
2002	168,556,000	Copper-plated steel	Rank-Broadley	Ironside
2003	260,225,000	Copper-plated steel	Rank-Broadley	Ironside
2004	356,396,000	Copper-plated steel	Rank-Broadley	Ironside
2005	280,396,000	Copper-plated steel	Rank-Broadley	Ironside
2006	170,637,000	Copper-plated steel	Rank-Broadley	Ironside
2007	254,500,000	Copper-plated steel	Rank-Broadley	Ironside
2008	10,600,000	Copper-plated steel	Rank-Broadley	Ironside
2008	241,679,000	Copper-plated steel	Rank-Broadley	Dent
2009	150,500,500	Copper-plated steel	Rank-Broadley	Dent
2010	99,600,000	Copper-plated steel	Rank-Broadley	Dent
2011	144,300,000	Copper-plated steel	Rank-Broadley	Dent
2012	67,800,000	Copper-plated steel	Rank-Broadley	Dent
2013	40,600,000	Copper-plated steel	Rank-Broadley	Dent
2014	247,600,020	Copper-plated steel	Rank-Broadley	Dent
2015	85,900,000	Copper-plated steel	Rank-Broadley	Dent
2015	139,200,000	Copper-plated steel	Clark	Dent
2016	185,600,000	Copper-plated steel	Clark	Dent
2017	16,600,000	Copper-plated steel	Clark	Dent
2018	0	Copper-plated steel	Clark	Dent
2019	0	Copper-plated steel	Clark	Dent
2020	0	Copper-plated steel	Clark	Dent
2021	117,700,000	Copper-plated steel	Clark	Dent
2022	0	Copper-plated steel	Clark	Dent
2023	0	Copper-plated steel	Jennings	The Royal Mint
2024	0	Copper-plated steel	Jennings	The Royal Mint

Mint sets have been produced since 1982; where mintages on or after that date indicate '0', there are examples contained within those sets.

== See also ==
- Coins of the pound sterling
- Twopence (British pre-decimal coin)
