= Penny (British decimal coin) =

Coin, one-hundredth of a pound sterling

One penny
- United Kingdom
- Value: £0.01 pound sterling
- Mass: 3.56 g
- Diameter: 20.3 mm
- Thickness: (Bronze) 1.52 mm; (Steel) 1.65 mm
- Edge: Plain
- Composition: Bronze (1971–1991); Copper-plated steel (1992–present)
- Years of minting: 1971–2023

Obverse
- Design: King Charles III
- Designer: Martin Jennings
- Design date: 2023

Reverse
- Design: Hazel dormouse
- Designer: The Royal Mint
- Design date: 2023

The British decimal penny (1p) is a denomination of sterling coinage worth 1/100 of one pound, or one penny. Its obverse featured the profile of Queen Elizabeth II since the coin's introduction on 15 February 1971, the day British currency was decimalised, until her death on 8 September 2022. A new portrait featuring King Charles III was introduced on 30 September 2022, designed by Martin Jennings. Four different portraits of the Queen were used on the obverse; the last design by Jody Clark was introduced in 2015. The second reverse, designed by Matthew Dent, features a segment of the Royal Shield and was used from 2008 to 2022. The third and current reverse, featuring a hazel dormouse, was introduced in 2023 following the accession of Charles III. The penny is the lowest value coin (in real terms) ever to circulate in the United Kingdom.

The penny was originally minted from bronze, but since 1992 has been minted in copper-plated steel due to increasing copper prices.

There are an estimated 10.5 billion 1p coins in circulation as of 2016, with a total face value of around £105,000,000.

Decimal one penny coins are legal tender only for amounts up to the sum of 20p when offered in repayment of a debt; however, the coin's legal tender status is not normally relevant for everyday transactions.

== Etymology ==
The word penny is derived from the Old English word penig, which itself comes from the proto-Germanic *panninga.

The plural of penny when referring to a number of penny coins is pennies; for example, "there were fifty pennies on the table". The plural of penny as a unit of currency is pence; for example, "the item cost fifty pence".

== History ==
Prior to 1971, the United Kingdom had been using the pounds, shillings, and pence currency system. Decimalisation was announced by Chancellor of the Exchequer James Callaghan on 1 March 1966; one pound would be subdivided into 100 pence, instead of 240 pence as previously was the case.

This required new coins to be minted, to replace the pre-decimal ones. The original specification for the 1p coin was set out in the Decimal Currency Act 1969, which was replaced by the Currency Act 1971. Both mandated the weight of the coin to be 3.564 grams ±0.0750g, and 2.032 cm ±0.125 mm in diameter. Subsequently, the Currency Act 1983 allows for the standards of the 1p coin to be changed by royal proclamation.

The new 1p coins began production in December 1968 in the newly built Royal Mint facility in Llantrisant, South Wales. 1,521,666,250 1p coins were minted between 1968 and the end of 1971. On 15 February 1971, the United Kingdom officially switched to a decimal currency and the new coins entered circulation. The coins continue to be minted at this facility today.

=== Metallic composition ===
The coin was originally minted in bronze (composition 97% copper, 2.5% zinc, 0.5% tin) between 1971 and September 1992. However, increasing world metal prices necessitated a change of composition. Since 1992, the coins have been minted in steel and electroplated in copper, making them magnetic. Rising world prices for copper had caused the metal value of the pre-1992 copper 1p coin to exceed 1p (for example, in May 2006, the intrinsic metal value of a pre-1992 1p coin was about 1.5 pence). Melting coins is illegal in the United Kingdom and is punishable by a fine, or up to two years imprisonment.

=== Obverse designs ===
==== Elizabeth II ====
During the reign of Queen Elizabeth II, four different obverses were used. The outer inscription on the coin is ELIZABETH II D.G.REG.F.D. 2013, where 2013 is replaced by the year of minting. In the original design both sides of the coin are encircled by dots, a common feature on coins, known as beading.

Anticipation of a switch to a decimalised currency led to the commissioning of a new Royal Portrait by artist Arnold Machin, which was approved by the Queen in 1964. This featured the Queen wearing the 'Girls of Great Britain and Ireland' Tiara and was used until 1984. A modified form of this portrait has appeared on British Postage stamps since 1967.

Between 1985 and 1997 a portrait by Raphael Maklouf was used. The portrait is couped, and depicts the Queen wearing the George IV State Diadem. Unlike previous portraits, the Queen is wearing jewellery, earrings and a necklace. The initials of Maklouf RDM are shown below the neck of the Queen. His middle name, David, is included so that the mark is not confused with the initials of the Royal Mint.

In 1997, a competition to design the obverse of the 1997 Golden Wedding crown – a coin issued to celebrate the Queen's and Prince Philip's 50th wedding anniversary – was held. The standard of entry was so high that following this competition, the Royal Mint held another to design the new portrait. Ian Rank-Broadley won this competition, and his design was used between 1998 and 2015. His design again featured the tiara, with a signature-mark IRB below the portrait. This depiction of the Queen was seen as more realistic than those that came before it, with Rank Broadley himself saying “No need to disguise the matureness of The Queen’s years. There is no need to flatter her. She is a 70-year-old woman with poise and bearing.”

In 2014, the Royal Mint again held a competition to design a new portrait. Designer Jody Clark won this competition, with a portrait of the Queen wearing the George IV State Diadem and the initials JC feature under the neck of the Queen. The portrait was sketched without an official sitting, only using reference material for inspiration.

==== Charles III ====
In October 2023, a new design featuring a left facing uncrowned bust of the newly crowned King Charles III was revealed. The outer inscription on the coin is CHARLES III.DEI.GRA.REX.FID.DEF. 2023, where 2023 is replaced by the year of minting. The design of the 2023 proof and uncirculated sets also included a Tudor crown privy mark. Subsequent sets and coins struck for circulation do not include this mark. In 2023, 600,000 pennies with the King Charles III design were minted for circulation.

=== Reverse designs ===
Despite no official government confirmation of a switch to decimalised currency, the Royal Mint began the design process for decimal coins in 1962. They invited the Royal Academy, the Royal Institute of British Architects, the Faculty of the Royal Designers for Industry and the Royal College of Art to nominate artists to design the hypothetical new coins. British sculptor Christopher Ironside won this competition, and his design was chosen to feature on the potential decimalised currency. His design for the 1p coin featured a Scottish theme, with a coin depicting a thistle above a Scottish flag inside a shield and a Scottish lion inside a shield. However, Chancellor James Callaghan's announcement that the United Kingdom would decimalise its currency included an open competition to find the new designs. Over 80 artists and 900 different designs were submitted. Ironside entered this competition with a further, different style of designs and won.

Portcullis reverse: 1982–2008

The reverse of the coin, which was minted from 1971 to 2008, featured a crowned portcullis with chains (an adaptation of the Badge of Henry VII which is now the Badge of the Palace of Westminster), with the numeral "1" written below the portcullis, and either NEW PENNY (1971–1981) or ONE PENNY (1982–2008) above the portcullis.

In August 2005 the Royal Mint launched a competition to find new reverse designs for all circulating coins apart from the £2 coin. The winner, announced in April 2008, was Matthew Dent, whose designs were gradually introduced into circulating British coinage from mid-2008. The designs for the 1p, 2p, 5p, 10p, 20p and 50p coins depict sections of the Royal Shield that form much of the whole shield when placed together. The entire shield was featured on the now-obsolete round £1 coin. The 1p coin depicts the left section between the first and third quarter of the shield, representing England and Northern Ireland. The coin's obverse remains largely unchanged, but the beading (the ring of dots around the coin's circumference), which no longer features on the coin's reverse, has also been removed from the obverse.

In October 2023 the King Charles III one penny coin was presented; the coin design features a hazel dormouse.

== Status ==
=== Speculation on withdrawal ===
The proposed withdrawal of the 1p coins has been subject of media speculation, such as in 2015 when the Chancellor of the Exchequer, George Osborne, proposed the withdrawal of the 1p coin. This was vetoed by Prime Minister David Cameron, because of the potential unpopularity with the public.

In March 2018, the Government launched a consultation on the future of payments in the British economy. One question focused on the denominational mix of coins, including 'dormant' denominations. This prompted speculation that the 1p and 2p coins could be withdrawn from circulation. Analysis from staff at the Bank of England concluded that fears about the withdrawal were 'unfounded' and that there would be no significant impact on prices if copper coins were scrapped, noting the sharp decline in usage of copper coins. Further, potential inflationary effects from the rounding of prices caused by scrapping the 1p would likely be minimal, given only 3% of payments by value are made in cash and card payments would continue to be made unrounded.

There was concern raised by some charities and businesses over the scrapping of 1p coins. Charities feared that the number of donations made in collection pots would fall and some business models could be severely impacted, for example traditional seaside arcades. However, in May 2019 Chancellor Philip Hammond announced the outcome of a 2018 consultation, suggesting there were no plans to scrap copper coins and that he wanted the public to "have choice over how they spend their money". No 1p coins were minted in 2018, as the Treasury said that there were already enough in circulation.

=== Value ===
Since around 2002, the penny has had the lowest value in real terms of any coin in the history of the United Kingdom, since at least its formation by the Acts of Union in 1707. All previous low-value coins were withdrawn before their purchasing power fell below the current value of the penny. The purchasing power of previous lowest-value coins is:

Coin	Face value (fraction of £1)	Withdrawn	2025 equivalent purchasing power at withdrawal
Half farthing	1/1920	1869/1870	5.4p
Farthing	1/960	1960	2.1p
Pre-decimal halfpenny	1/480	1969	3p
Pre-decimal penny	1/240	1971	5.3p
Decimal halfpenny	1/200	1984	1.6p

== Types and specifications ==
Minted	Image	Obverse designer	Reverse designer	Material	Diameter	Weight
1971–1981		Arnold Machin	Christopher Ironside	Bronze	20.3 mm	3.56g
1982–1984		Arnold Machin	Christopher Ironside	Bronze	20.3 mm	3.56g
1985–1992		Raphael David Maklouf	Christopher Ironside	Bronze	20.3 mm	3.56g
1992–1997		Raphael David Maklouf	Christopher Ironside	Copper-plated steel	20.3 mm	3.56g
1998—2008 (Note: Proof and uncirculated sets in 1999 were struck in bronze as well as copper-plated steel)		Ian Rank-Broadley	Christopher Ironside	Copper-plated steel	20.3 mm	3.56g
2008–2015		Ian Rank-Broadley	Matthew Dent	Copper-plated steel	20.3 mm	3.56g
2015–2022		Jody Clark	Matthew Dent	Copper-plated steel	20.3 mm	3.56g
2023—present		Martin Jennings	The Royal Mint	Copper-plated steel	20.3 mm	3.56g

== Mintages ==
Elizabeth II (Machin portrait)
Year	Number minted
1971	1,521,666,250
1972	150,000 (In proof sets only)
1973	280,196,000
1974	330,892,000
1975	221,604,000
1976	300,160,000
1977	285,430,000
1978	292,770,000
1979	459,000,000
1980	416,304,000
1981	301,800,000
1982	100,292,000
1983	243,002,000
1984	154,759,625

Elizabeth II (Maklouf portrait)
Year	Number minted
1985	200,605,245
1986	369,989,130
1987	499,946,000
1988	793,492,000
1989	658,142,000
1990	529,047,500
1991	206,457,600
1992	253,867,000
1993	602,590,000
1994	843,834,000
1995	303,314,000
1996	723,840,060
1997	396,874,000

Elizabeth II (Rank-Broadley portrait)
Year	Number minted
1998	739,770,000
1999	891,392,000
2000	1,060,420,000
2001	928,698,000
2002	601,446,000
2003	539,436,000
2004	739,764,000
2005	536,318,000
2006	524,605,000
2007	548,002,000
2008	180,600,000 (Ironside reverse)
2008	507,952,000 (Dent reverse)
2009	556,412,800
2010	609,603,000
2011	431,004,000
2012	227,201,000
2013	260,800,000
2014	464,801,520
2015	154,600,000

Elizabeth II (Clark portrait)
Year	Number minted
2015	418,201,016
2016	368,482,000
2017	240,999,600
2018	33,086 (In proof and uncirculated sets only)
2019	44,158 (In proof and uncirculated sets only)
2020	88,071,910
2021	56,000,000
2022	30,000,000

Charles III
Year	Number minted
2023	600,000 (Hazel dormouse) (plus 256,158 in proof and uncirculated sets)
2024	0

== See also ==
- History of the British penny (1714–1901)
- History of the British penny (1901–1970)
