= British penny =

British penny may refer to:

== Coins ==
- Penny (British decimal coin)
- Penny (British pre-decimal coin)
- Penny (English coin)
