= XP2 =

XP2, XP 2, XP.2, XP-2, may refer to:

== Vehicles ==
- Hyperloop One XP-2, an experimental hyperloop pod
- McLaren XP2, a prototype sports car, predecessor to the McLaren F1 street-legal supercar
- McLaren XP2, a prototype sports car, predecessor to the McLaren Speedtail street-legal supercar

=== Aviation ===
- Curtiss XP-2, a prototype version of the Curtiss P-2 "Hawk", interwar U.S. Army biplane fighter
- Chu XP-2, an airplane; see List of aircraft (Ai–Am)
- Guiyang XP-2, an airplane; see List of aircraft (Cd–Cn)
- Martin XP6M-1 Seamaster, BuNo 138822, c/n XP-2; a U.S. military airplane which crashed in 1956

== Other uses ==
- Ilford XP2, a chromogenic black-and-white film stock
- Milano Bovisa railway station (station code XP2), Bovisa, Milan, Italy
- Xtreme Pankration 2 (XP 2), a mixed martial arts tournament; see Joe Son

== See also ==
- MAGEB2, a protein and gene also called "MAGE-XP-2"
- XPP (disambiguation)
- XP (disambiguation)
