= Matthew Dent =

Matthew Dent may refer to:

- Matthew Dent (footballer), former Australian rules footballer
- Matthew Dent (designer), designer of the new British coinage
