= Prospects Course Exchange =

Prospects Course Check
- Website: https://courseprovider.gp.prospects.ac.uk/coursecheck

Prospects Course Exchange is a system that manages XCRI-CAP feeds, enabling course data from higher education providers to be visible through Prospects' postgraduate course search.

It is run and operated by Graduate Prospects.

Prospects Course Check is a free course validation checker also provided by the service.

Prospects Course Exchange
- Developer(s): HECSU
- Website: http://xcri.prospects.ac.uk/

== See also ==
- XCRI
