= PXS =

PXS may refer to:

- The PXS suit, a NASA prototype space suit
- The ticker symbol for Provexis on the London Stock Exchange
- The ticker symbol for an exchange-traded fund on the Toronto Stock Exchange
- PXS, an abbreviation variant for PES or Pseudoexfoliation syndrome

== See also ==
- PX (disambiguation)
