= 10P =

10P, 10-P or 10.P may refer to:

- AMX-10P, a French Army tank
- 10P/Tempel, a comet
- British ten pence coin
- 10th Planet Jiu-Jitsu
