= PX =

PX or px may refer to:

== In business ==
- PX Index, index of the Prague Stock Exchange
- Prescriptives, a former subsidiary brand of The Estée Lauder Companies
- Air Niugini (IATA airline code PX)
- Part exchange, a type of contract
- Post exchange, a store operated by the Army and Air Force Exchange Service on US Army posts
- Praxair (stock symbol PX)
- Power exchange, the entity that operates an electricity market through which electricity is traded
- Phone Number
- People Experience, the rebranding of Human Resources (HR), reflecting a focus on putting people and their experiences first

== Medicine ==
- Medical prescription (a misprint of Rx)
- Medical procedure, a Prognosis or Physical Exam
- Patient experience

== Chemistry ==
- p-Xylene (Paraxylene), an aromatic hydrocarbon, based on benzene with two methyl substituents, of which PX is the industrial symbol.
- Peroxidase
- Pyroxenes, commonly abbreviated to Px, are a group of important rock-forming inosilicate minerals
- Protein crystallography, the study of protein crystals to determine the molecular structure of proteins

== Other uses ==
- Pixel, in digital displays
- PX clade, a taxonomic group of stramenopiles algae that includes Phaeophyceae and Xanthophyceae
- Operation PX, a planned Japanese biological attack on the United States in World War II
- Chi Rho ☧ (only if misspelt) – a Christian monogram formed by superimposing the Greek letters Χ (chi) and P (rho).
- Pedro Ximénez, a grape used in the making of sweet sherries and wines from Montilla-Moriles
- Saviem PX, a range of heavy-duty trucks

== See also ==
- PXS (disambiguation)
- XP (disambiguation)
- X (disambiguation)
- P (disambiguation)
