= XPS =

XPS may refer to:

- X-ray photoelectron spectroscopy (XPS), also known as electron spectroscopy for chemical analysis (ESCA)
- Extreme Ultraviolet Photometer System (XPS). an instrument aboard the NASA Solar Radiation and Climate Experiment (SORCE) space probe
- Extruded polystyrene foam (XPS) as insulation material
- Open XML Paper Specification (XPS or OpenXPS), an open royalty-free fixed-layout document format developed by Microsoft
- Transmit packet steering, a scaling technique for network traffic processing
- XP International (ICAO airline code XPS), Dutch airline, a division of KLM; see List of defunct airlines of the Netherlands
- XPS Pensions, UK pensions group
- Dell XPS, a line of high-end consumer PCs
- Intel Paragon XP/S supercomputers
- Pisidian language (ISO 639 language code xps), an extinct Anatolian language

== See also ==
- XP (disambiguation) for the singular of XPs
