= Ten pence (British coin) =

British decimal coin

- United Kingdom
- Value: £0.10 pound sterling
- Mass: (1992–present) 6.5 g; (1968–1992) 11.31 g
- Diameter: (1992–present) 24.5 mm; (1968–1992) 28.5 mm
- Thickness: (Cupro-nickel) 1.85 mm; (Steel) 2.05 mm
- Edge: Milled
- Composition: Nickel-plated steel (2012–present); Cupro-nickel (1971–2012)
- Years of minting: 1968–present

Obverse
- Design: Queen Elizabeth II
- Designer: Jody Clark
- Design date: 2015

Reverse
- Design: Segment of the Royal Shield
- Designer: Matthew Dent
- Design date: 2008

The British decimal ten pence piece (10p) is a denomination of sterling coinage worth 1/10 of a pound, or ten pence. Its obverse has featured the profile of the British monarch since the coin's introduction in 1968, to replace the florin (two shilling) coin in preparation for decimalisation in 1971. It remained the same size as the florin (which also remained legal tender) until a smaller version was introduced on 30 September 1992, with the older coins and the pre-decimal florin being withdrawn on 30 June 1993.

The ten pence coin was originally minted from cupro-nickel (75% Cu, 25% Ni), but since 2012 it has been minted in nickel-plated steel due to the increasing price of metal. From January 2013 the Royal Mint began a programme to gradually remove the cupro-nickel coins from circulation and replace them with the nickel-plated steel versions.

As of March 2014, there were an estimated 1,631 million 10p coins in circulation, with an estimated face value of £163.08 million.

Ten pence coins minted after 1992 are legal tender for amounts up to the sum of £5 for repayment of a debt; (Note: These coins can be differentiated because the older ones (before 1993) are larger and heavier than current 10p coins.) however, the coin's legal tender status is not normally relevant for everyday transactions.

== Design ==
=== Obverse ===
During Queen Elizabeth II's reign, four different obverses were used. The inscription until 2015 was ELIZABETH II D.G.REG.F.D., followed by the year of minting. In the original design both sides of the coin are encircled by dots, a common feature on coins, known as beading.

As with all new decimal currency, until 1984 the portrait of Elizabeth II by Arnold Machin appeared on the obverse, in which the Queen wears the 'Girls of Great Britain and Ireland' Tiara.

Between 1985 and 1997 the portrait by Raphael Maklouf was used, in which the Queen wears the George IV State Diadem.

On 30 September 1992 a reduced-size version of the 10 pence coin was introduced. The older and larger version of the coin was withdrawn from circulation on 30 June 1993. The design remained unchanged.

From 1998 to 2015 the portrait by Ian Rank-Broadley was used, again featuring the tiara, with a signature-mark IRB below the portrait.

From 2015, the obverse featured a portrait by Jody Clark.

=== Reverse ===
Reverse: 1982–2008

==== Original reverse design ====
The original reverse of the coin, designed by Christopher Ironside, and used from 1968 to 2008, is a crowned lion (formally, Part of the crest of England, a lion passant guardant royally crowned), with the numeral "10" below the lion, and either NEW PENCE (1968–1981) or TEN PENCE (1982–2008) above the lion.

==== Royal Shield design ====
In August 2005 the Royal Mint launched a competition to find new reverse designs for all circulating coins apart from the £2 coin. The winner, announced in April 2008, was Matthew Dent, whose designs were gradually introduced into the circulating British coinage from mid-2008. The designs for the 1p, 2p, 5p, 10p, 20p and 50p coins depict sections of the Royal Shield that form the whole shield when placed together. The shield in its entirety was featured on the now-obsolete round £1 coin. The 10p coin depicts part of the first quarter of the shield, showing two of the lions passant from the Royal Banner of England, with the words TEN PENCE above the shield design. The coin's obverse remains largely unchanged, but the beading (the ring of dots around the coin's circumference), which no longer features on the coin's reverse, has also been removed from the obverse.

==== A to Z design (Great British Coin Hunt) ====
In March 2018, new designs were released, one for each of the 26 letters of the alphabet. Anne Jessopp, chief executive of the Royal Mint, described the designs as "iconic themes that are quintessentially British". The A to Z coins were confirmed to have individual mintage figures of 220,000 on 14 October 2019 – a total of 5.72 million for all 26.

- A – Angel of the North
- B – Bond... James Bond
- C – Cricket
- D – Double-decker bus
- E – English breakfast
- F – Fish and chips
- G – Greenwich Mean Time
- H – Houses of Parliament
- I – Ice cream
- J – Jubilee
- K – King Arthur
- L – Loch Ness Monster
- M – Mackintosh
- N – NHS
- O – Oak tree
- P – Post box
- Q – Queuing
- R – Robin
- S – Stonehenge
- T – Tea
- U – Union Flag
- V – Village
- W – World Wide Web
- X – X marks the spot
- Y – Yeoman Warder
- Z – Zebra crossing

=== King Charles III definitive design ===
In October 2023 the King Charles III ten-pence coin was presented; the coin features a capercaillie.

== Mintages ==
Number of ten pence coins minted for circulation by year
Year	Number minted	Composition	Diameter (mm)	Portrait	Reverse
1968	336,143,250	Cupro-nickel	28.5	Machin	Ironside
1969	314,008,000	Cupro-nickel	28.5	Machin	Ironside
1970	133,571,000	Cupro-nickel	28.5	Machin	Ironside
1971	63,205,000	Cupro-nickel	28.5	Machin	Ironside
1972	0	Cupro-nickel	28.5	Machin	Ironside
1973	152,174,000	Cupro-nickel	28.5	Machin	Ironside
1974	92,741,000	Cupro-nickel	28.5	Machin	Ironside
1975	181,559,000	Cupro-nickel	28.5	Machin	Ironside
1976	228,220,000	Cupro-nickel	28.5	Machin	Ironside
1977	59,323,000	Cupro-nickel	28.5	Machin	Ironside
1978	0	Cupro-nickel	28.5	Machin	Ironside
1979	115,457,000	Cupro-nickel	28.5	Machin	Ironside
1980	88,650,000	Cupro-nickel	28.5	Machin	Ironside
1981	3,487,000	Cupro-nickel	28.5	Machin	Ironside
1982	0	Cupro-nickel	28.5	Machin	Ironside
1983	0	Cupro-nickel	28.5	Machin	Ironside
1984	0	Cupro-nickel	28.5	Machin	Ironside
1985	0	Cupro-nickel	28.5	Maklouf	Ironside
1986	0	Cupro-nickel	28.5	Maklouf	Ironside
1987	0	Cupro-nickel	28.5	Maklouf	Ironside
1988	0	Cupro-nickel	28.5	Maklouf	Ironside
1989	0	Cupro-nickel	28.5	Maklouf	Ironside
1990	0	Cupro-nickel	28.5	Maklouf	Ironside
1991	0	Cupro-nickel	28.5	Maklouf	Ironside
1992	1,413,455,170	Cupro-nickel	24.5	Maklouf	Ironside
1993	0	Cupro-nickel	24.5	Maklouf	Ironside
1994	0	Cupro-nickel	24.5	Maklouf	Ironside
1995	43,259,000	Cupro-nickel	24.5	Maklouf	Ironside
1996	118,738,000	Cupro-nickel	24.5	Maklouf	Ironside
1997	99,196,000	Cupro-nickel	24.5	Maklouf	Ironside
1998	0	Cupro-nickel	24.5	Rank-Broadley	Ironside
1999	0	Cupro-nickel	24.5	Rank-Broadley	Ironside
2000	134,733,000	Cupro-nickel	24.5	Rank-Broadley	Ironside
2001	129,281,000	Cupro-nickel	24.5	Rank-Broadley	Ironside
2002	80,934,000	Cupro-nickel	24.5	Rank-Broadley	Ironside
2003	88,118,000	Cupro-nickel	24.5	Rank-Broadley	Ironside
2004	99,602,000	Cupro-nickel	24.5	Rank-Broadley	Ironside
2005	69,604,000	Cupro-nickel	24.5	Rank-Broadley	Ironside
2006	118,803,000	Cupro-nickel	24.5	Rank-Broadley	Ironside
2007	72,720,000	Cupro-nickel	24.5	Rank-Broadley	Ironside
2008	9,720,000	Cupro-nickel	24.5	Rank-Broadley	Ironside
2008	71,447,000	Cupro-nickel	24.5	Rank-Broadley	Dent
2009	84,360,000	Cupro-nickel	24.5	Rank-Broadley	Dent
2010	96,600,500	Cupro-nickel	24.5	Rank-Broadley	Dent
2011	59,603,850	Cupro-nickel	24.5	Rank-Broadley	Dent
2012	11,600,030	Nickel-plated steel	24.5	Rank-Broadley	Dent
2013	320,200,750	Nickel-plated steel	24.5	Rank-Broadley	Dent
2014	490,202,020	Nickel-plated steel	24.5	Rank-Broadley	Dent
2015	119,000,000	Nickel-plated steel	24.5	Rank-Broadley	Dent
2015	91,900,000	Nickel-plated steel	24.5	Clark	Dent
2016	135,380,000	Nickel-plated steel	24.5	Clark	Dent
2017	33,300,000	Nickel-plated steel	24.5	Clark	Dent
2018	0	Nickel-plated steel	24.5	Clark	Dent
2018	5,720,000	Nickel-plated steel	24.5	Clark	A to Z
2019	0	Nickel-plated steel	24.5	Clark	Dent
2019	2,100,000	Nickel-plated steel	24.5	Clark	A to Z
2020	45,347,846	Nickel-plated steel	24.5	Clark	Dent
2021	71,200,000	Nickel-plated steel	24.5	Clark	Dent
2022	38,000,000	Nickel-plated steel	24.5	Clark	Dent
2023	600,000	Nickel-plated steel	24.5	Jennings	The Royal Mint
2024	0	Nickel-plated steel	24.5		
2025	0				
2026	6,500,000				

Number of ten pence "A to Z" design coins minted for circulation by year
Year	Letter	Description	Number minted
2018	A	Angel of the North	220,000
2018	B	Bond... James Bond	220,000
2018	C	Cricket	220,000
2018	D	Double Decker Bus	220,000
2018	E	English Breakfast	220,000
2018	F	Fish and Chips	220,000
2018	G	Greenwich Mean Time	220,000
2018	H	Houses of Parliament	220,000
2018	I	Ice Cream Cone	220,000
2018	J	Jubilee	220,000
2018	K	King Arthur	220,000
2018	L	Loch Ness Monster	220,000
2018	M	Mackintosh	220,000
2018	N	NHS	220,000
2018	O	Oak Tree	220,000
2018	P	Postbox	220,000
2018	Q	Queuing	220,000
2018	R	Robin	220,000
2018	S	Stonehenge	220,000
2018	T	Tea	220,000
2018	U	Union Flag	220,000
2018	V	Villages	220,000
2018	W	World Wide Web	220,000
2018	X	X Marks The Spot	220,000
2018	Y	Yeoman Warder	220,000
2018	Z	Zebra Crossing	220,000
2019	A	Angel of the North	84,000
2019	B	Bond... James Bond	84,000
2019	C	Cricket	84,000
2019	D	Double Decker Bus	84,000
2019	E	English Breakfast	84,000
2019	F	Fish and Chips	84,000
2019	G	Greenwich Mean Time	84,000
2019	H	Houses of Parliament	84,000
2019	I	Ice Cream Cone	84,000
2019	J	Jubilee	84,000
2019	K	King Arthur	84,000
2019	L	Loch Ness Monster	84,000
2019	M	Mackintosh	84,000
2019	N	NHS	84,000
2019	O	Oak Tree	84,000
2019	P	Postbox	84,000
2019	Q	Queuing	83,000
2019	R	Robin	64,000
2019	S	Stonehenge	84,000
2019	T	Tea	84,000
2019	U	Union Flag	84,000
2019	V	Villages	84,000
2019	W	World Wide Web	63,000
2019	X	X Marks The Spot	84,000
2019	Y	Yeoman Warder	63,000
2019	Z	Zebra Crossing	63,000

Mint sets have been produced since 1982; where mintages on or after that date indicate '0', there are examples contained within those sets.
