= XCRI =

XCRI stands for eXchanging Course Related Information, and the XCRI Course Advertising Profile (XCRI-CAP) is an information model, supported by an XML specification, used to share information about courses between UK education institutions and aggregators such as Prospects and other sites that advertise courses.

XCRI is developed by a community-based group with no formal membership processes, similar to initiatives such as Microformats. The infrastructure of its communications (website, forum and wiki) was run by JISC-CETIS and funded by Jisc.

== UK Standard ==
The Information Standards Board (ISB), part of the UK's Department for Children, Schools and Families (DCSF) approved XCRI-CAP 1.1 as the UK eProspectus standard in January 2009.

== Patents and open standards ==
Like many "informal" specifications, XCRI releases are under a Creative Commons license.

== History ==
=== 2005-2006 ===
XCRI was originally developed as part of a project funded by Jisc in April 2005.

This project was focused around exploring how education institutions developed their portfolio of courses (also known as curriculum management) and the potential for new approaches to interoperability. The project created an information model and XML schema for course management primarily aimed at use within universities and colleges.

=== 2007-2008 ===
In March 2007 an XCRI project received funding from Jisc to focus primarily on developing a much more lightweight specification aimed at helping universities and colleges syndicate information about their courses to aggregators and brokerage services, such as services that handle applications to universities. The project was funded for two years, with the premise that at the end of the project in 2009, the resulting specification would be handed off to an open standards process.

JISC also funded a handful of XCRI mini-projects during this period to pilot and experiment with the information model.

=== 2009 ===
XCRI-CAP version 1.1 was endorsed in January 2009 by the UK's Information Standards Board (ISB) as the UK's eProspectus standard. The ISB is part of the Department For Education and is the official authority for information and data standards in education, skills and children's services.

== European standardisation ==
In 2008 work began at the European Committee for Standardization (CEN) to develop a new standard for course descriptions to be used across Europe: EN 15982 -Metadata for Learning Opportunities- (MLO) Advertising. The XCRI Course Advertising Profile is one of several specifications, including Norway's Course Description Metadata submitted as part of this effort. XCRI-CAP 1.2 is a conformant profile of BS EN 15982, and was formalised as BS 8581 parts 1 & 2 in October 2012.

== Implementations ==
The XCRI Course Advertising Profile has been adopted at a number of UK education institutions, see list of feeds.

== Criticisms ==
While XCRI has generally been considered a success by its funders and participants, there have been criticisms of the approach taken in developing the Course Advertising Profile.

eLearning commentator Stephen Downes has criticised XCRI for developing a new XML specification rather than basing it on RSS, which would enable courses to be aggregated using existing technologies. .

The choice by the XCRI developers to be inspired by RDF design principles but not to use an RDF binding approach has also been slightly controversial; this approach was also taken by the developers of the Atom Syndication Format.
