= XP =

XP may refer to:

== Science and technology ==
=== Computing ===
- Windows XP, a Microsoft operating system
- Microsoft Office XP, a version of the software suite
- Athlon XP, a series of AMD microprocessors
- Extreme programming, a software development methodology
- XP (class), a complexity class in parameterized complexity

=== Medicine ===
- Xanthelasma palpebrarum, a cholesterol deposit in the eyelid
- Xeroderma pigmentosum, a genetic disorder

=== Other technology ===
- Ilford XP, a chromogenic black and white film made by Ilford Photo

== Transport ==
- XP, United States aircraft designator, formerly for Experimental Pursuit, currently for Experimental Patrol
- Avelo Airlines (IATA code: XP), an American ultra-low-cost airline

== Other uses ==
- XP Inc., a Brazilian investment management company
- Experience point, a unit for measuring a character's progress in role-playing games
- Purpleland (NATO country code XP), a fictitious country used in military operations
- XP, an emoticon
- X phrase, in X-bar theory in linguistics
- Xp Lee, a Thailand-born American politician

== See also ==
- Chi Rho (☧, or chi-rho), a Christian symbol for Christ
- 10P (disambiguation)
- PX (disambiguation)
- XPS (disambiguation)
