= XPP =

XPP may refer to:

- Poplar River Airport, the IATA code for the airport in Canada
- XML Professional Publisher, a standards-based, high performance, content formatting and publishing application
- XML Pull Parsing, a method of parsing an XML document, StAX parsers are an implementation of a pull parser.
- eXtreme Processing Platform, a processor architecture
- XPP-AUT, a tool for solving stochastic, differential, and difference equations, amongst others.
- X++, the programming language behind Microsoft Dynamics AX
