= Matthew Dent (designer) =

British graphic designer

- Born: 1981 (age 44–45); Bangor, Gwynedd, Wales
- Education: Coleg Menai; University of Brighton
- Known for: Graphic design
- Notable work: Coins of the pound sterling from 2008
- Website: http://www.mattdent.com

Matthew Dent (born in 1981 in Bangor, Wales) is a British graphic designer. His designs were selected for the new reverse sides of seven coins of the pound sterling, after a competition open to the public by the Royal Mint on 2 April 2008.

Dent studied art at Coleg Menai and graduated in graphic design from the University of Brighton. The competition was to re-design the reverses of all circulation British coins (except the two pound coin which had only been introduced eleven years earlier). His entry was selected as the best of 4,000 and he was given a one-off payment of £35,000.

Dent's designs were inspired by heraldry. He divided the shield of the Royal coat of arms of the United Kingdom among the pence coins, so that when they are placed together they show the entire shield. The full shield appears on his pound coin, which before the competition had no fixed design, instead changing every year to represent Scotland, Wales, England and Northern Ireland.

In 2011 he designed a commemorative fifty pence coin for the Royal Mint to celebrate 50 years of the World Wildlife Fund. It featured 50 small pictures of plants, animals and natural resources.

In 2012 he designed a limited edition two pound coin featuring the face of Charles Dickens made up from his book titles, to celebrate the 200th anniversary of Dickens's birth.
