= Jody Clark =

English engraver

- Born: Jody Clark; 1 March 1981 (age 45); Lake District, Cumbria, England, United Kingdom
- Education: University of Central Lancashire
- Occupation: Engraver
- Notable work: The final definitive coin portrait of Queen Elizabeth II; Reverse of The Queen's Beasts (coin) bullion series
- Website: jodyclark.com

Jody Clark (born 1 March 1981) is a British engraver formerly employed by the Royal Mint. He designed the fifth and final portrait of Queen Elizabeth II to feature on coins of the pound sterling, and that portrait was the sixth and final to feature on coins of the Australian dollar.

== Career ==
Since he joined the Royal Mint in September 2012, Clark has worked on a number of projects including commemorative pieces which were given to attendees of the 2014 NATO Summit in Wales and medals struck to commemorate the 2014 Ryder Cup which took place at Gleneagles Hotel, Scotland. He has also worked on commissions for Azerbaijan, Costa Rica, Lesotho and Tanzania. In 2014 a design by Clark was featured on the Britannia coin. Prior to joining the Mint, Clark worked in commercial packaging design.

In 2015 Clark's anonymous submission to a design competition was chosen to become the fifth definitive coin portrait of Elizabeth II to feature on British coins. Clark was the first employee of the Royal Mint in over one hundred years to have designed such a portrait of the monarch. At the age of 33 when his design was chosen, Clark was younger than any of the other four designers to have created portraits of Elizabeth II for British coinage at the time their design was chosen. Uniquely, Clark's portrait of the Queen was created using computer-aided design software to turn his initial sketches into the required low-relief model, with no manual sculpting being used. Production of coins bearing Clark's design began on 2 March 2015, and they appeared in circulation later in 2015.

== Personal life ==
Clark is originally from the Lake District in Cumbria. In early 2015 he went on paternity leave following the birth of his first child.

| Preceded by Ian Rank-Broadley | Coins of the pound sterling Obverse designer 2015 | Succeeded by Martin Jennings |
