= Diamond Diadem =

Crown made for King George IV of the United Kingdom

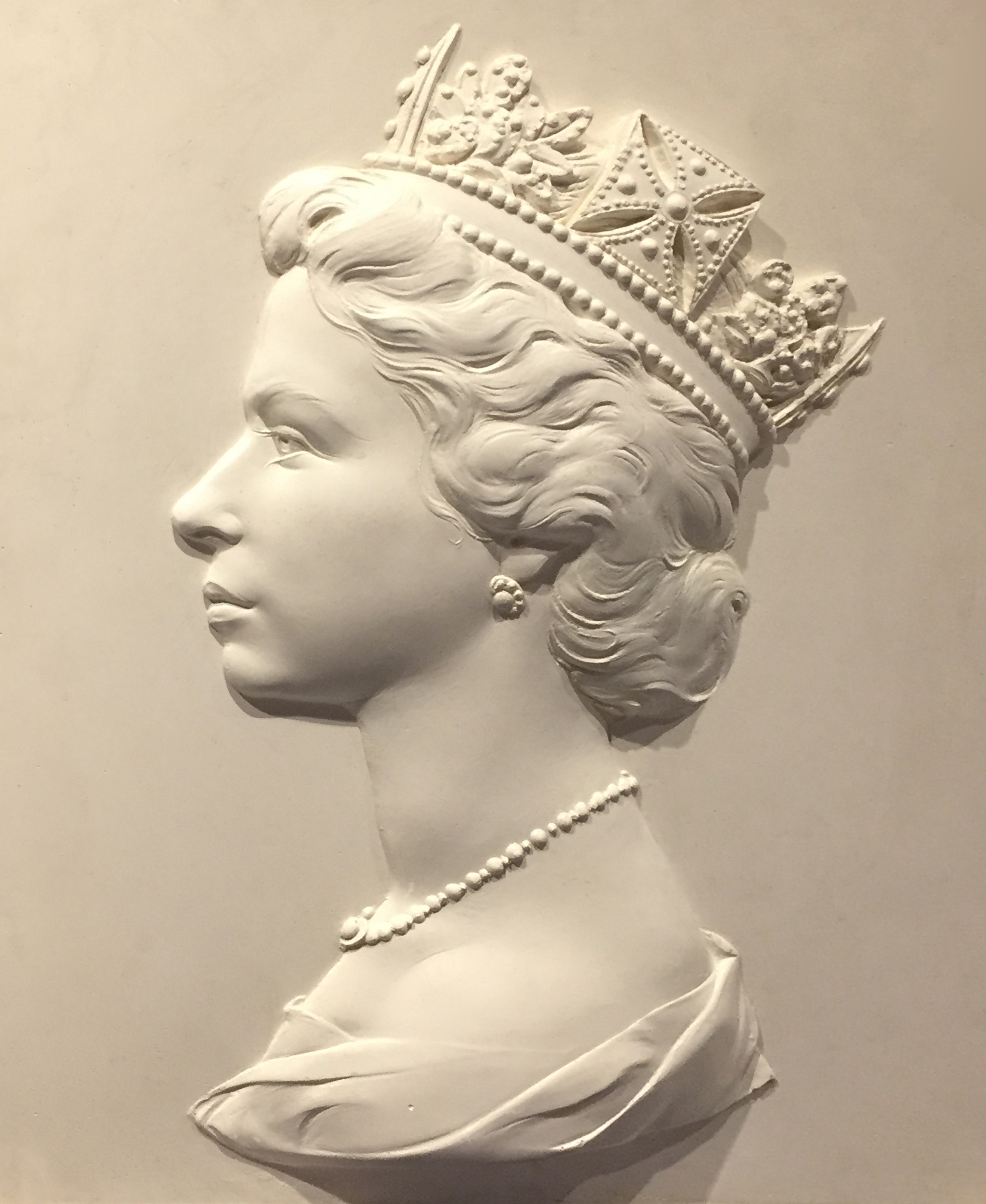
Relief on which the Machin series of UK stamps was based, with Elizabeth II wearing the diadem

The Diamond Diadem, historically known as the George IV State Diadem, is a diadem that was made in 1820 for King George IV. The diadem has been worn by queens regnant and queens consort in procession to coronations and State Openings of Parliament. It has been featured in paintings and on stamps and currency.

== Origin ==
George IV commissioned Rundell & Bridge to make the diadem in 1820 at a cost of £8,216. The fee included a hire charge of £800 for the diamonds but there is no evidence they were ever returned to the jewellers. These are the equivalent of £800,000 and £80,000 in 2024, respectively. George IV wore the diadem over his velvet cap of maintenance in the procession to his coronation at Westminster Abbey.

== Description ==
External videos
- Short video on YouTube by the Royal Collection Trust (2022)

The gold and silver frame, measuring 7.5 centimetres (3.0 in) tall and 19 centimetres (7.5 in) in diameter, is decorated with 1,333 diamonds weighing a total of 320 carats (64 g), including a four-carat yellow diamond in the front cross pattée. Along the base are two strings of pearls. Originally, the upper string had 86 pearls and the lower 94, but they were changed to 81 and 88 in 1902. Instead of the heraldic fleurs-de-lis usually seen on British crowns, the diadem has four bouquets of roses, thistles and shamrocks, the floral symbols of England, Scotland and Ireland respectively, alternating with four crosses pattée around the top of its base.

== Use ==
It has been worn by every queen regnant and queen consort from Queen Adelaide, the wife of King William IV, to Queen Camilla, the wife of King Charles III. The diadem may have been reset with jewels from the royal collection for Queen Victoria, although the Royal Collection Trust suggests the original 1820 stones were discreetly purchased from Rundell Bridge and Rundell and remain in situ. Queen Elizabeth II wore the diadem in the procession to her coronation in 1953, and she also wore it in the procession to and from the annual State Opening of Parliament.

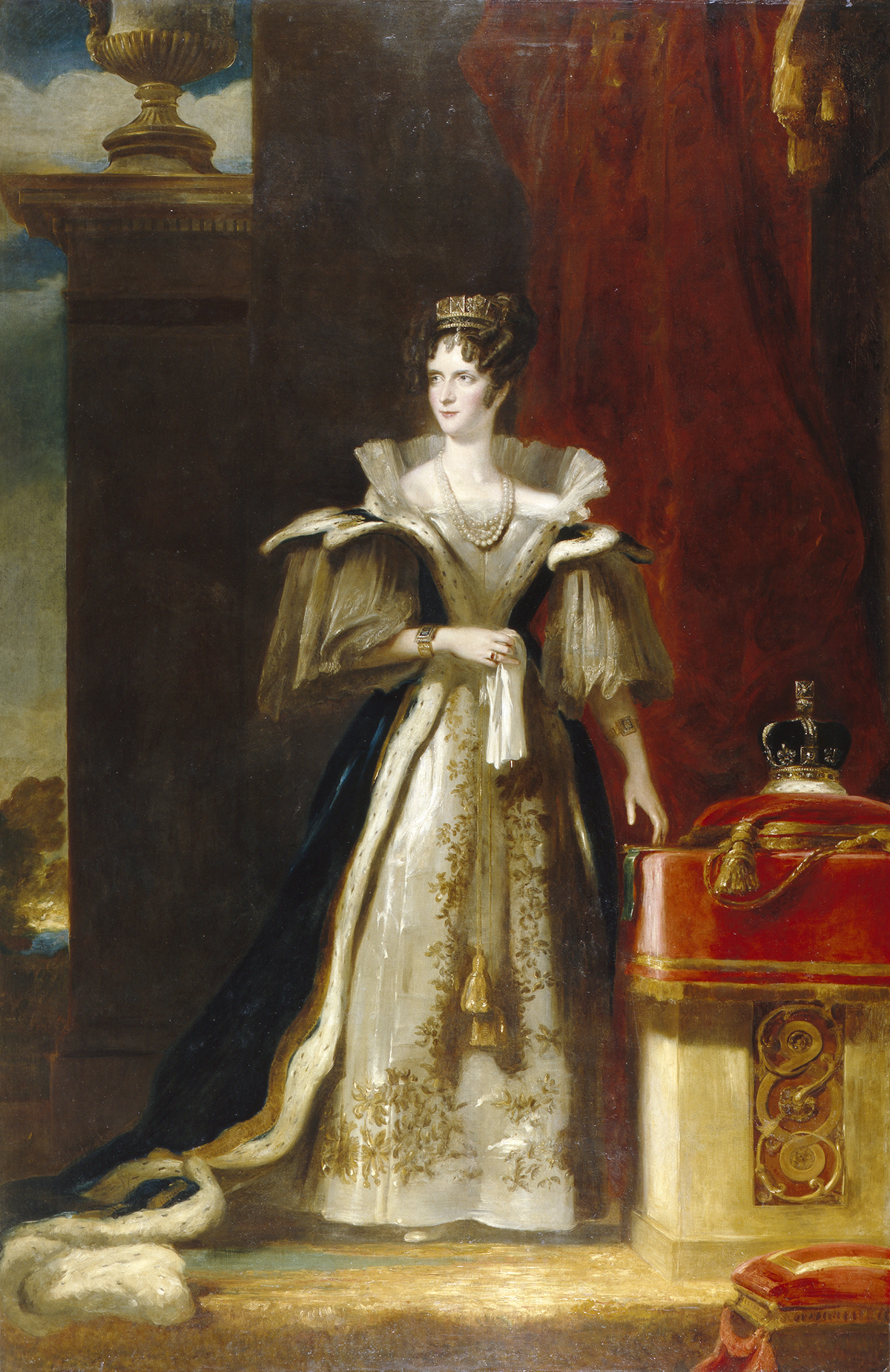
Queen Adelaide wearing the diadem

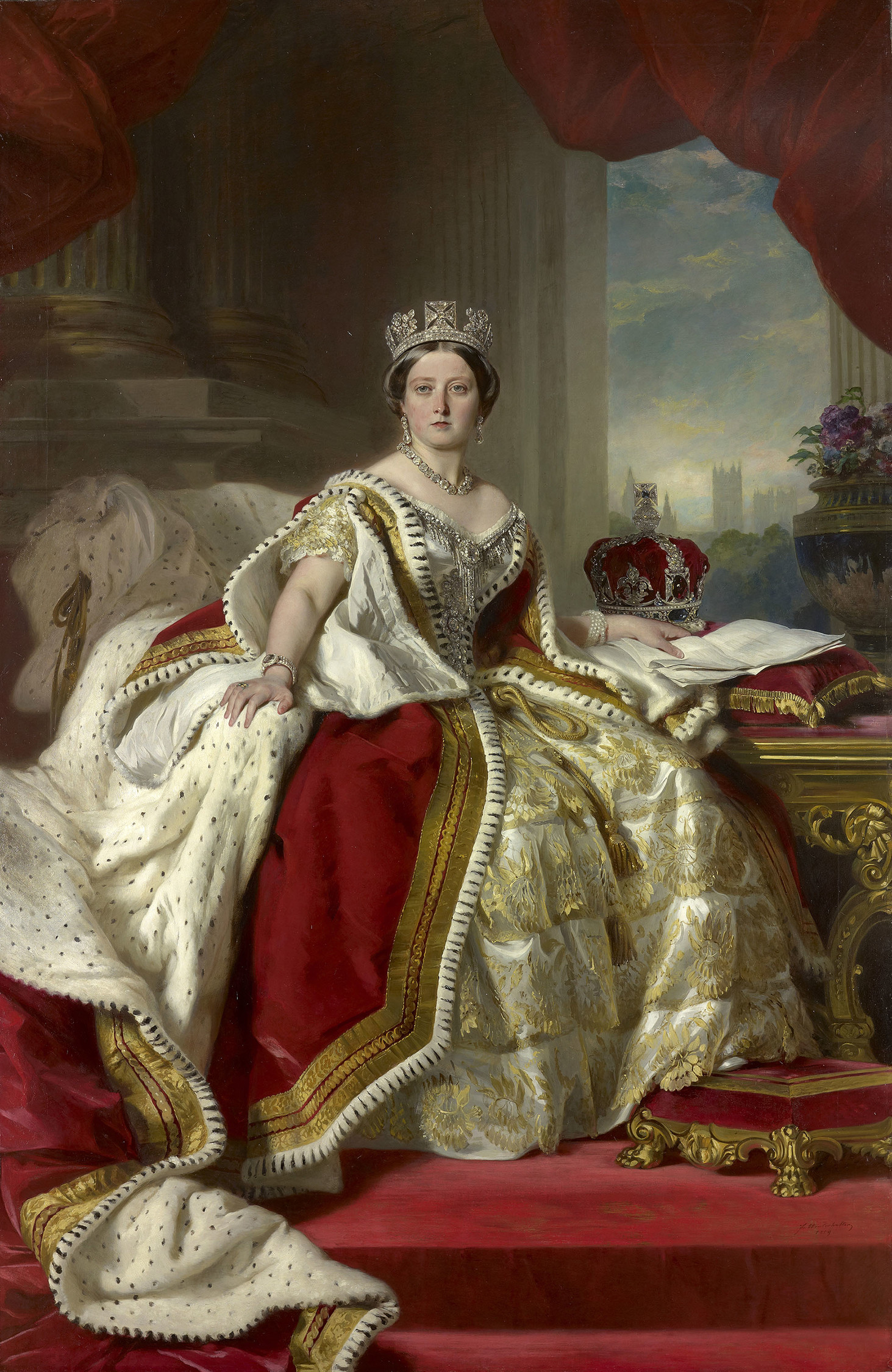
Queen Victoria wearing the diadem

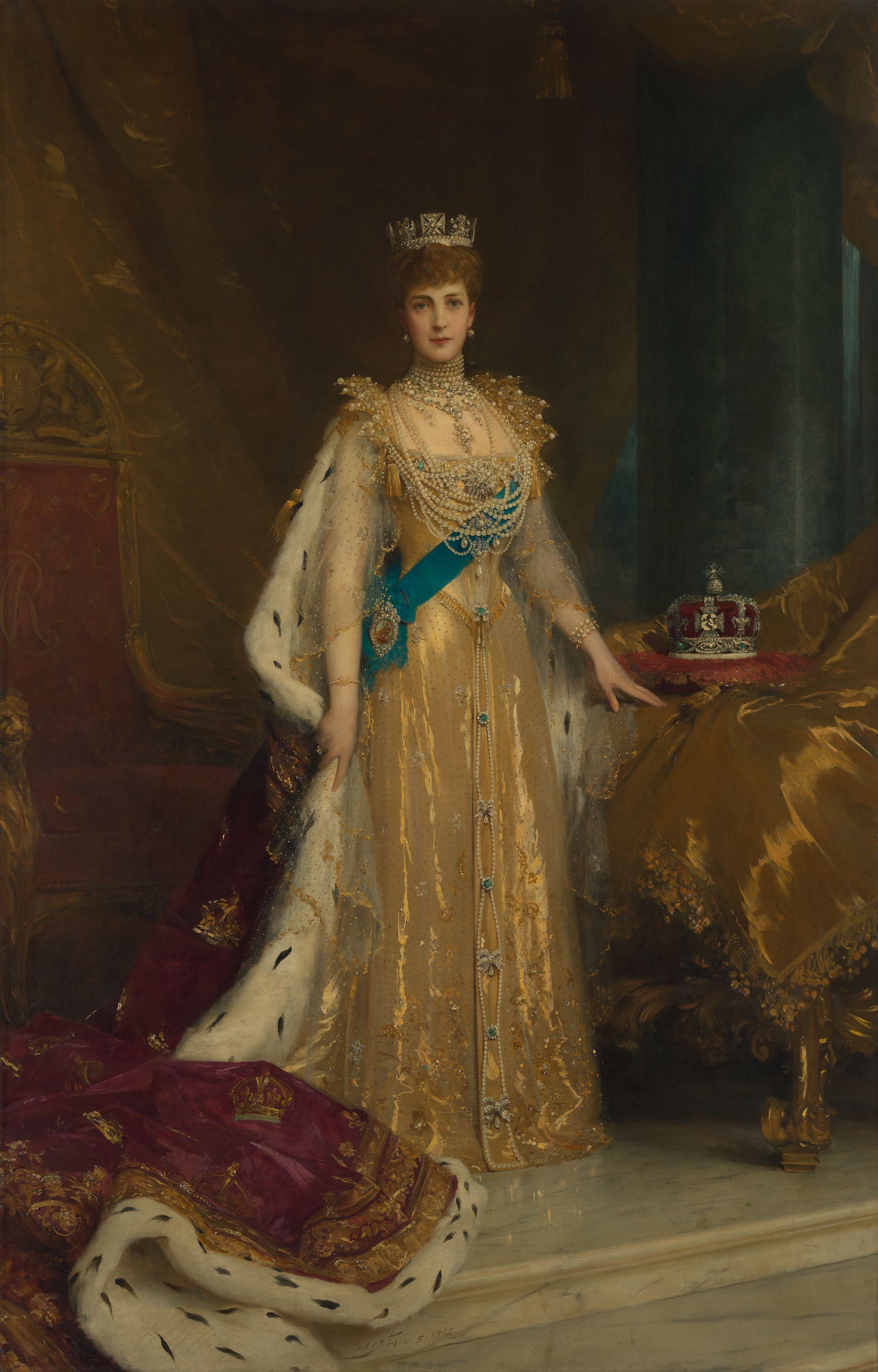
Queen Alexandra wearing the diadem

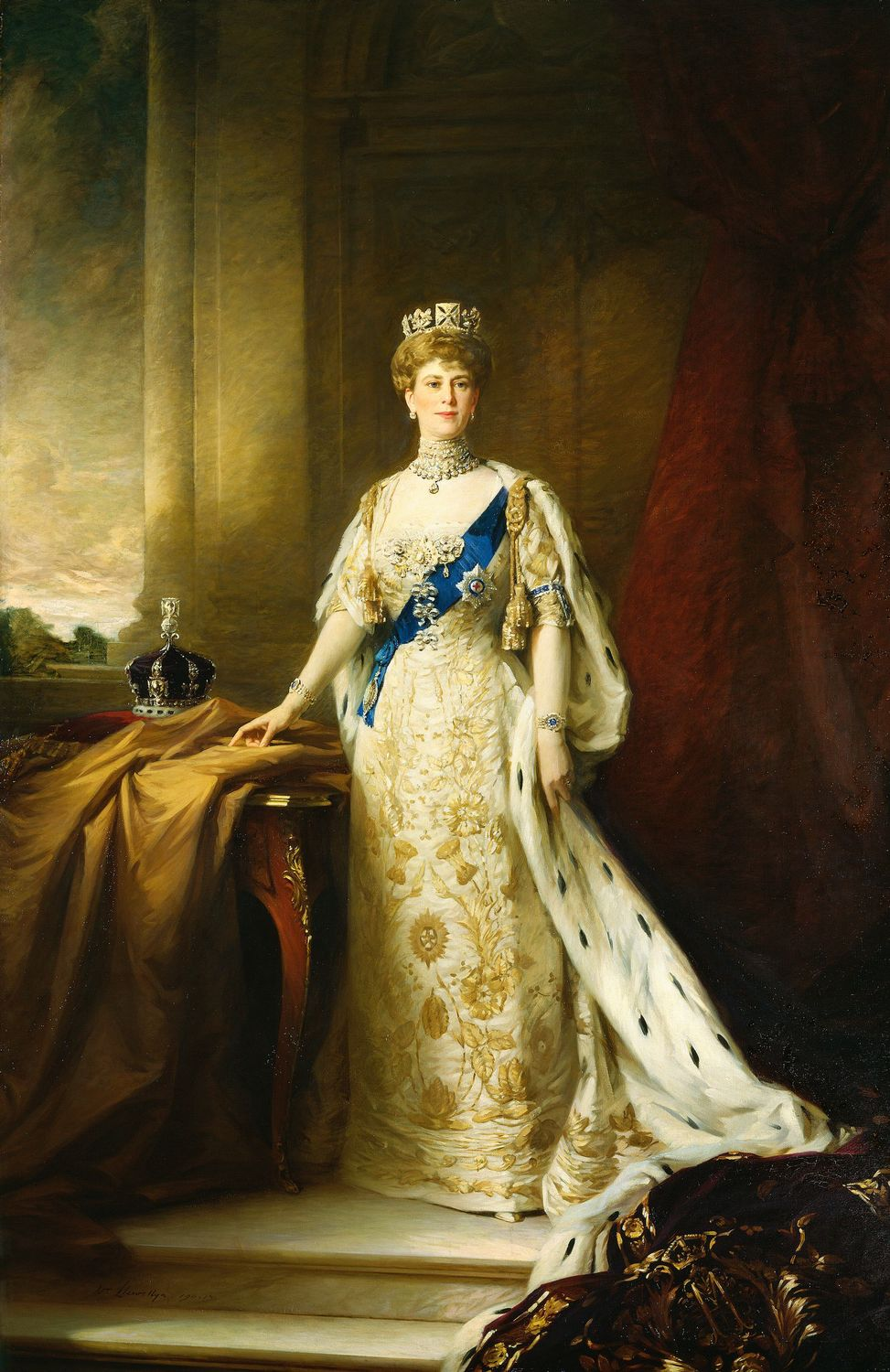
Queen Mary wearing the diadem

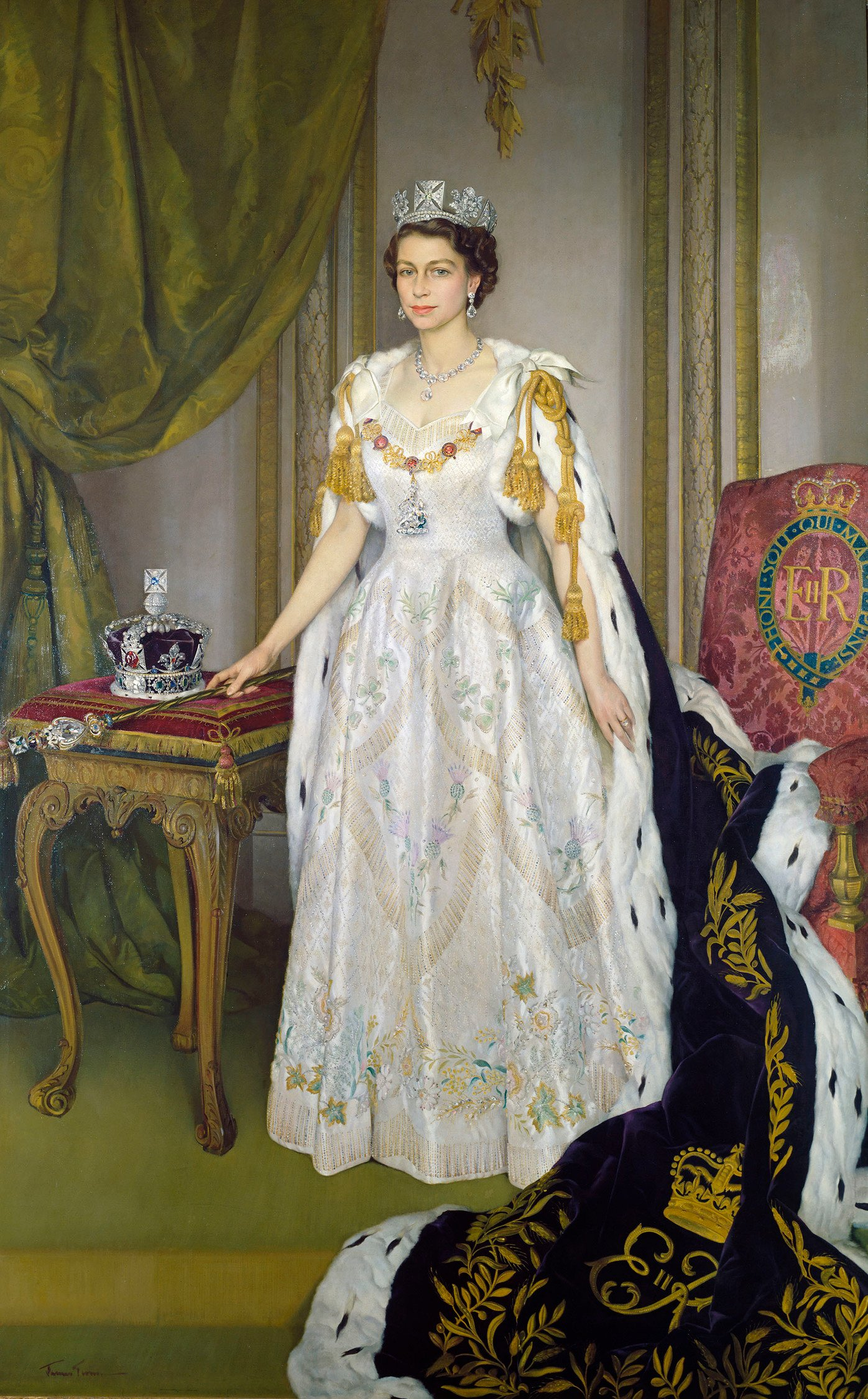
Queen Elizabeth II wearing the diadem

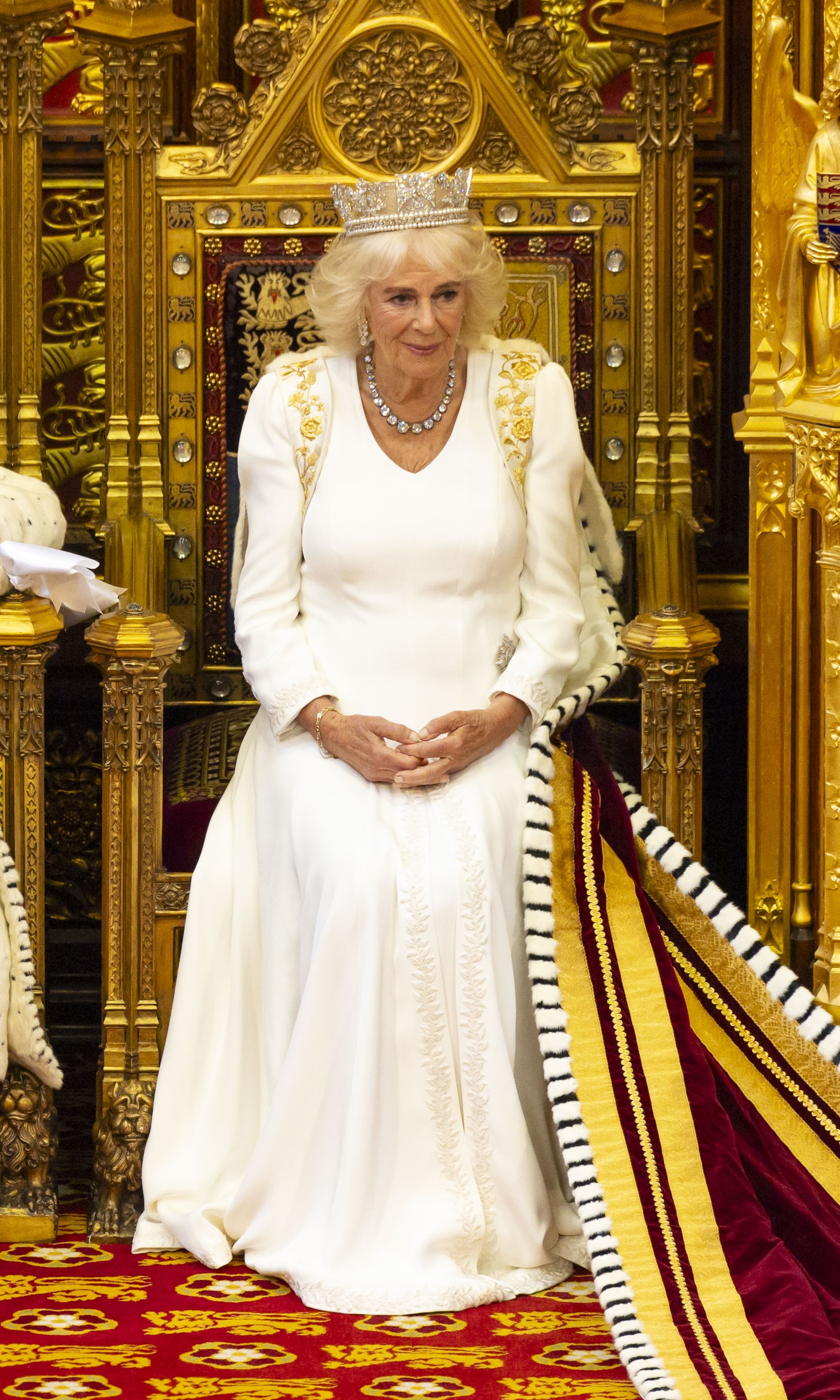
Queen Camilla wearing the diadem

== In art, stamps, and currency ==
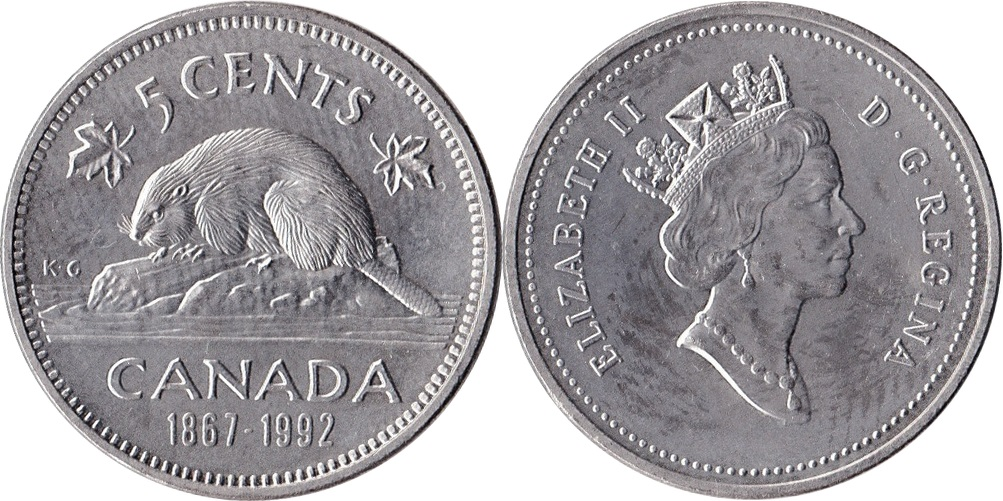
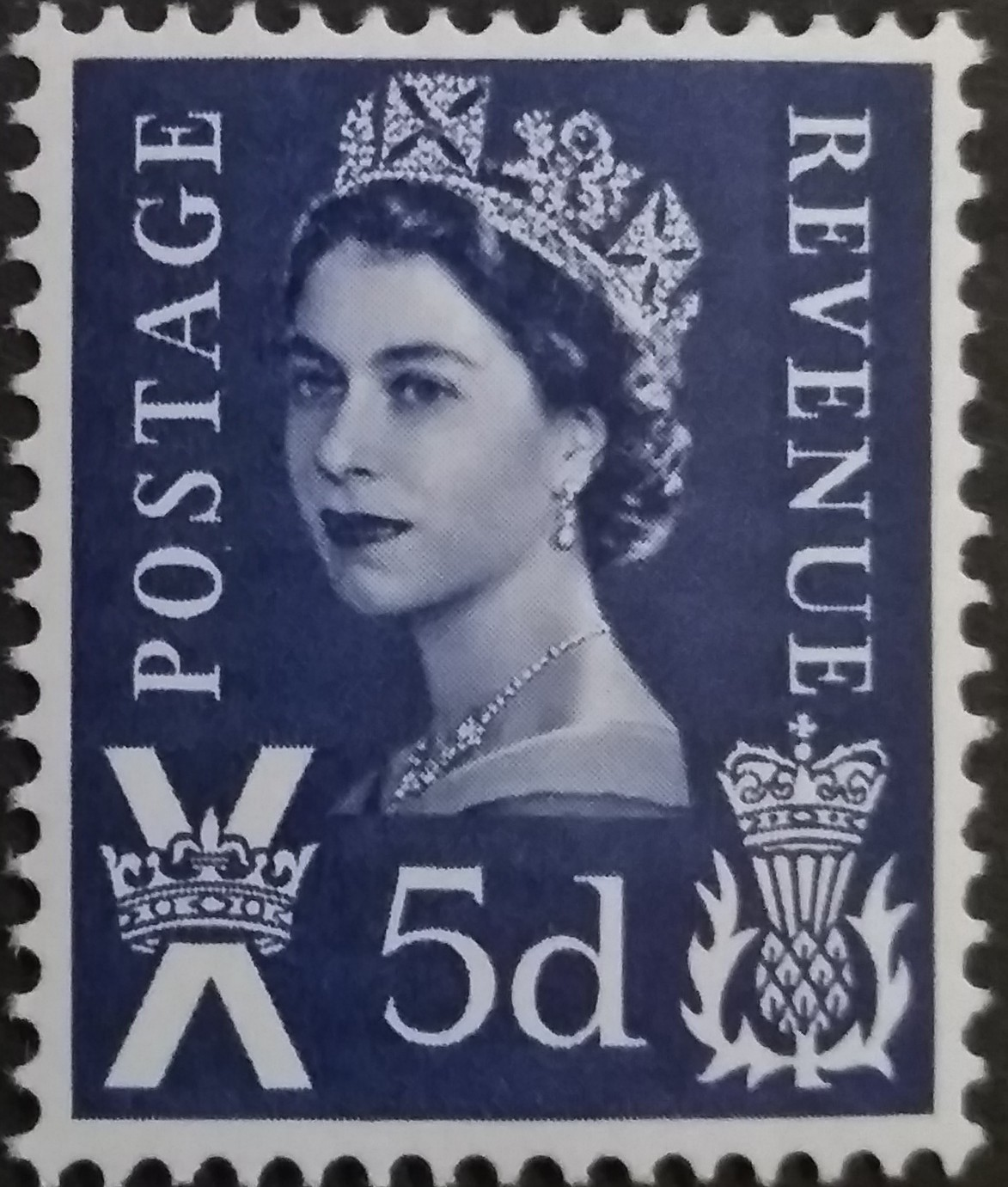
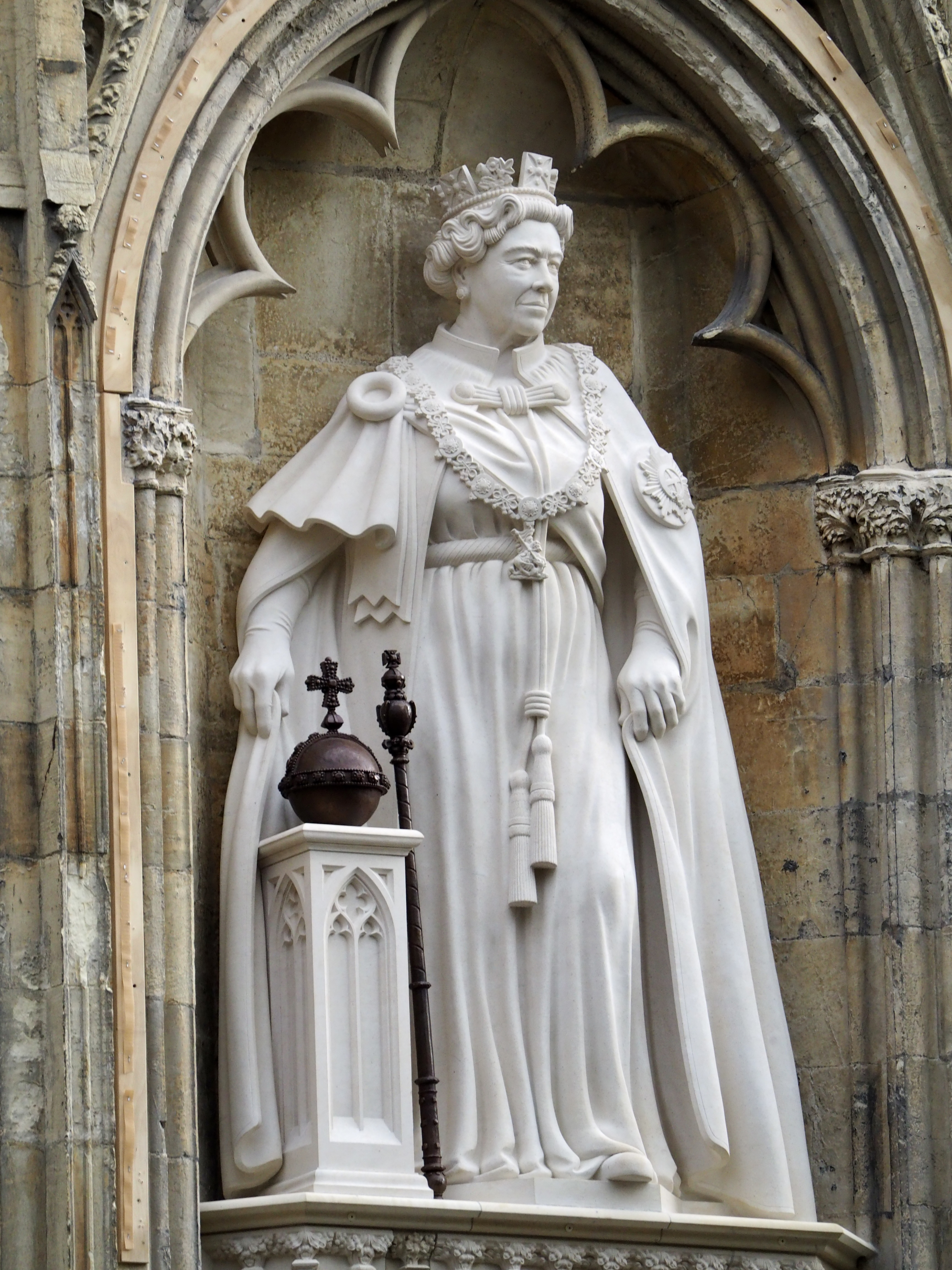
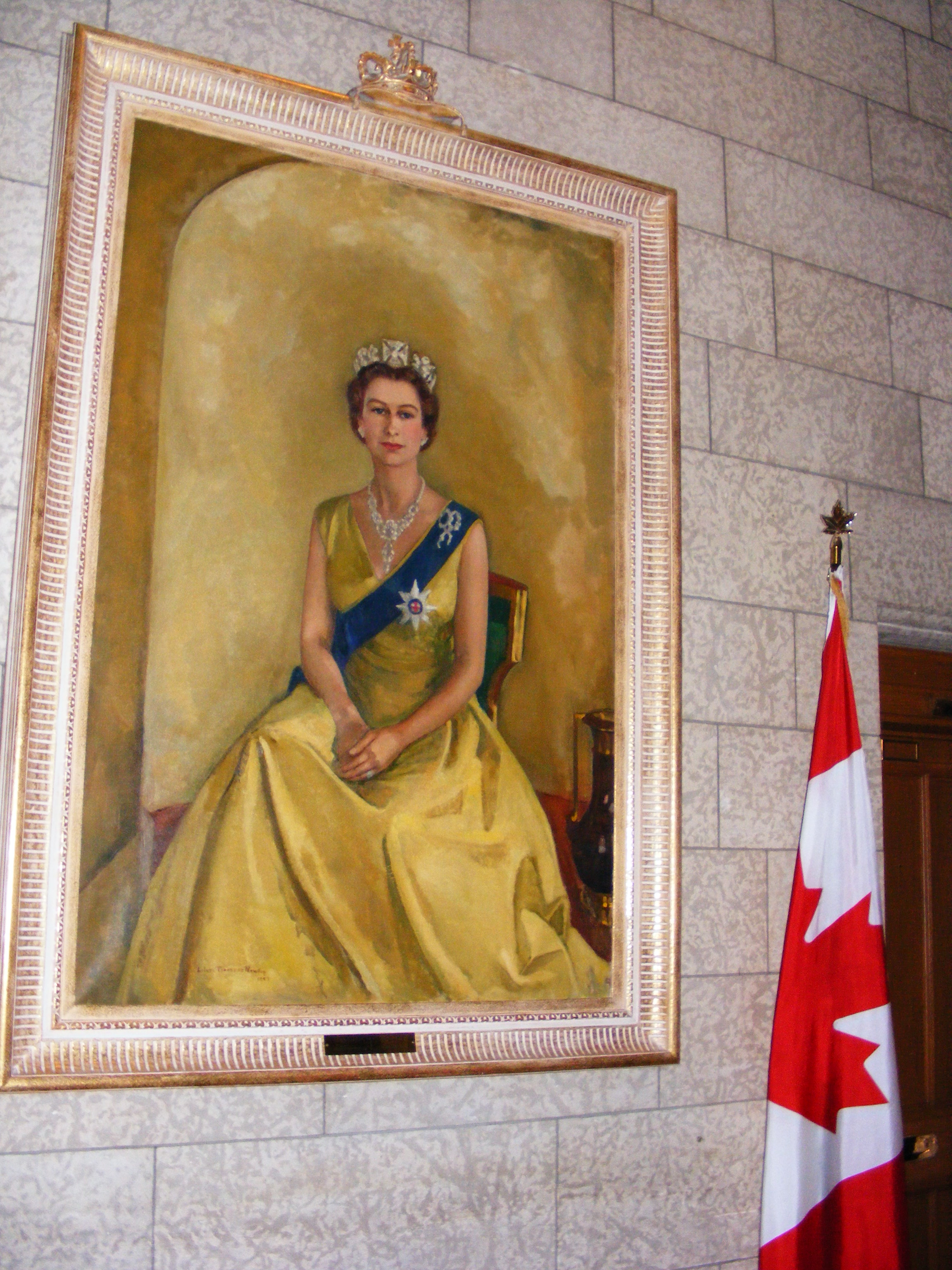
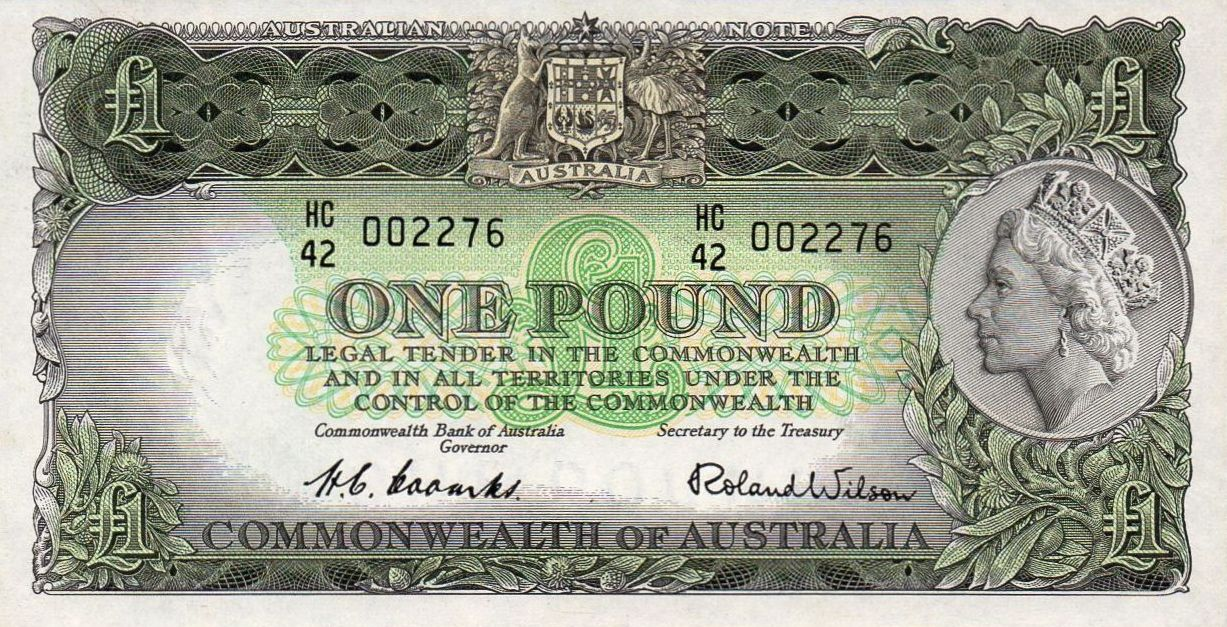
The Diamond Diadem on various coins, stamps, and banknotes of Queen Elizabeth II

The iconic piece of jewellery has featured in many portraits of Queen Elizabeth II, including the Portrait of Elizabeth II by Lucian Freud in 2001 and one by Raphael Maklouf in 1984 that appears on Commonwealth coinage.

Arnold Machin designed an earlier portrait in the 1960s that was used on coins and the Machin series of postage stamps in the UK.

The diadem has also featured on the coins and banknotes of most Commonwealth realms, and those of Anguilla, Bermuda, British Guiana, British Honduras, British Virgin Islands, Cyprus, Dominica, Fiji, British Hong Kong, Malaya, Malta, Mauritius, British North Borneo, Rhodesia and Nyasaland, Southern Rhodesia, St Kitts and Nevis, the Isle of Man (coins only) and Trinidad and Tobago.

== See also ==
- Crown Jewels of the United Kingdom
- Coronation Crown of George IV
- Jewels of Elizabeth II
