= Coins of the Newfoundland dollar =

Newfoundland, as a separate British colony, produced its own decimal currency between 1865 and 1947. The Coins of Newfoundland are of historical importance as Newfoundland was a British colony until 1907, and a Dominion until 1949, when Newfoundland and Labrador became the tenth province of Canada.

== Traders' tokens ==
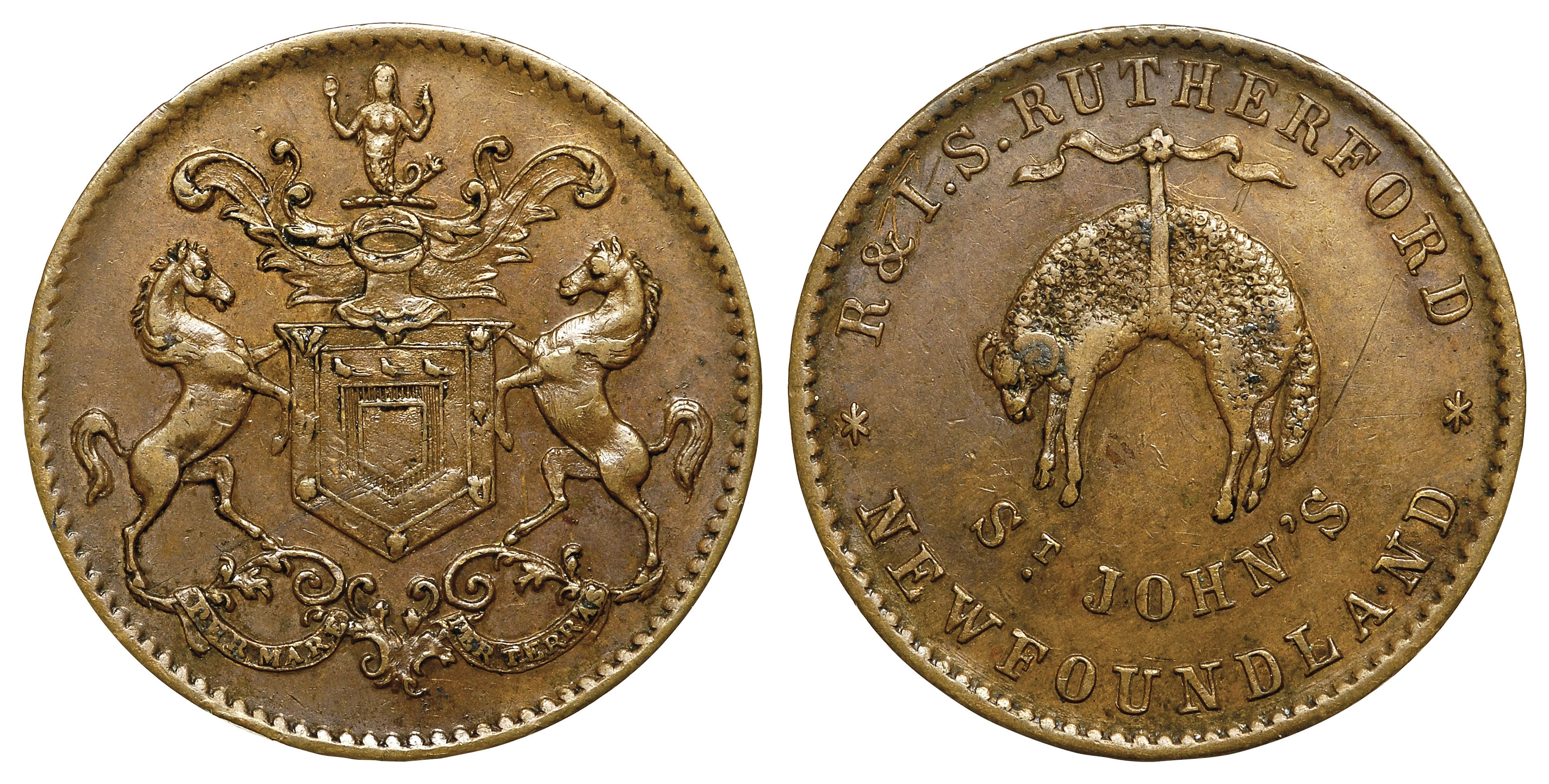
Newfoundland Rutherford Halfpenny Token (St. John's) c. 1840

=== Rutherford brothers ===
The first Newfoundland traders' tokens were Halfpenny tokens issued by brothers Robert & I.S. Rutherford in St John's in 1840–41. There are two varieties of the tokens – a dated type and an undated type.

In 1846, after a fire destroyed the St. John's store, two additional Rutherford Brothers (George and Andrew) opened a new store in Harbour Grace and issued a second set of tokens, inscribed RUTHERFORD BROS. These pieces were minted by Ralph Heaton & Sons of Birmingham, England (commonly known as Heaton's Mint). These pieces are unique in one respect – they have the 'RH' mintmark above the date.

=== The Peter M'Auslane farthing ===
Another early Newfoundland traders' token was issued in the 1840s by Peter M'Auslane, a general merchant in St John's. Following the same 1846 St. John's fire which destroyed his business, he left Newfoundland and settled in Upper Canada (now Ontario).

The obverse of this very rare piece is inscribed 'PETER M'AUSLANE St. JOHNS NEWFOUNDLAND', and the reverse is inscribed 'SELLS ALL SORTS OF SHOP & STORE GOODS'.

=== Anonymous issues ===
These pieces do not bear either an issuer's name or a place name. There were two issues of these pieces: a Halfpenny dated 1858 and a Halfpenny dated 1860.

The 1858 Halfpenny token, which is very rare, has a ship on the obverse similar to the Ship Halfpenny tokens from Prince Edward Island. The date 1858 alone appears across the centre of the reverse.

The 1860 Halfpenny token, which is scarce has the date 1860 in the centre of the obverse inside a circle. The inscription FISHERY RIGHTS FOR NEWFOUNDLAND is enclosed outside the inner circle. The reverse of this piece is inscribed RESPONSIBLE GOVERNMENT going around the outside and AND FREE TRADE is in the centre of the reverse. This piece makes a political statement on promoting the fishing industry and asserting a claim to responsible government.

== Newfoundland dollar coinage (1865–1947) ==
In 1865, Newfoundland changed over to decimal currency following the footsteps of Canada, New Brunswick, and Nova Scotia. Pattern coins were issued in 1864, as were specimen cents.

Newfoundland was the only British North American colony to have its own gold coin (though the Ottawa mint also produced gold sovereigns). Originally, a gold dollar was considered, but it was decided it might be lost by the fishermen due to its small size. Thus, a two-dollar denomination was chosen for the gold coin. Three (equivalent) denominations were indicated on the coin, as it was denominated as $2, 200 cents, and 100 pence (equivalent value in sterling).

One thing that differentiates the later versions of the dollar coins is that they feature the crowned Percy Metcalfe effigy of King George VI. Usually, this portrait is used for Crown colonies such as Hong Kong, Malaya, or India, whereas for normal Canadian coins, an uncrowned effigy of the King by Thomas Humphrey Paget is used.

=== Complete type set of Newfoundland dollar coinage ===
Coins of the Newfoundland dollar
| Monarch | Value | Obverse/Reverse | Issue date (Note: The combination of Issue date and presence or absence of a mintmark confirms the place of issue. Canadian coins between 1858–1907 were struck in England either by the Royal Mint in London (no mintmark), or the Heaton Mint in Birmingham (mintmark letter H). In 1908 the Royal Mint opened a branch in Ottawa and used the letter "C" as a mintmark.) | Design |
|---|---|---|---|---|
| Victoria | 1 cent | | 1865, 1872(H); 1873, 1876(H); 1880, 1885; 1888, 1890; 1894, 1896 | Horace Morehen (des); Thomas Minton (eng) |
| Victoria | 5 cents | | 1865, 1870; 1872(H), 1873 (Note: 1873 5-cent Newfoundland coins were struck both with and without the "H" mintmark.); 1876(H), 1880–81; 1882(H), 1885; 1888, 1890; 1894, 1896 | Leonard Charles Wyon |
| Victoria | 10 cents | | 1865, 1870; 1872(H), 1873; 1876(H), 1880; 1882(H), 1885; 1888, 1890; 1894, 1896 | Leonard Charles Wyon (Note: The 1871H coins are rare and have Canada's reverse design. All 1880s have the second 8 punched over a 7.) |
| Victoria | 20 cents | | 1865, 1870; 1872(H), 1873; 1876(H), 1880–81; 1882(H), 1885; 1888, 1890; 1894, 1896; 1899, 1900 | Leonard Charles Wyon and Horace Morehen |
| Victoria | 50 cents | | 1870, 1872(H); 1873–74, 1876(H); 1880–81, 1882(H); 1885, 1888; 1894, 1896; 1898–1900 | Leonard Charles Wyon |
| Victoria | 2 dollars | | 1865, 1870; 1872, 1880–81 (Note: The 1880 two-dollar gold coin is rare with a total mintage of 2,500 pieces.); 1882(H), 1885; 1888 | Leonard Charles Wyon |
| Edward VII | 1 cent | | 1904(H); 1907; 1909 | George William de Saulles (obv); Horace Morehen (rev) |
| Edward VII | 5 cents | | 1903; 1904(H); 1908 | George William de Saulles |
| Edward VII | 10 cents | | 1903; 1904(H) | George William de Saulles |
| Edward VII | 20 cents | | 1904(H) | George William de Saulles (obv); W.H.J. Blakemore(rev) |
| Edward VII | 50 cents | | 1904(H); 1907–09 | George William de Saulles (obv); W.H.J. Blakemore (rev) |
| George V | 1 cent | | 1913; 1917(C); 1919–20(C); 1929; 1936 | Edgar Bertram MacKennal (obv); Horace Morehen (rev) |
| George V | 5 cents | | 1912; 1917(C); 1919(C); 1929 | Edgar Bertram MacKennal (obv); George William de Saulles (rev) |
| George V | 10 cents | | 1912; 1917(C); 1919(C) | Edgar Bertram MacKennal (obv); George William de Saulles (rev) |
| George V | 20 cents | | 1912 | Edgar Bertram MacKennal (obv); W.H.J. Blakemore (rev) |
| George V | 25 cents | | 1917(C); 1919(C) | Edgar Bertram MacKennal (obv); W.H.J. Blakemore (rev) |
| George V | 50 cents | | 1911; 1917–19(C) | Edgar Bertram MacKennal (obv); W.H.J. Blakemore (rev) |
| George VI | 1 cent | | 1938, 1940; 1941(C), 1942; 1943–44(C); 1947(C) | Percy Metcalfe (obv); Walter J. Newman (rev) |
| George VI | 5 cents | | 1938, 1940–43(C); 1944–47(C) (Note: In 1944 and 1945 the 5-cent and 10-cent coins (respectively) depicting George VI were slightly altered in content but not design. The silver purity was reduced from 0.9259 to 0.8000 resulting in a silver weight change in both the 5-cent (0.0350oz to 0.0300oz) and 10-cent (0.0701oz to 0.0600oz) coins.) | Percy Metcalfe (obv); George William de Saulles (rev) |
| George VI | 10 cents | | 1938, 1940; 1941–44(C); 1945–47(C) (Note: The 1946C 10-cent coin is rare with a total mintage of 2,041 pieces.) (Note: In 1944 and 1945 the 5-cent and 10-cent coins (respectively) depicting George VI were slightly altered in content but not design. The silver purity was reduced from 0.9259 to 0.8000 resulting in a silver weight change in both the 5-cent (0.0350oz to 0.0300oz) and 10-cent (0.0701oz to 0.0600oz) coins.) | Percy Metcalfe (obv); George William de Saulles (rev) |

== Works cited ==
- Berman, Allen G. (2008). Warman's Coins And Paper Money: Identification and Price Guide (4 ed.). Krause Publications. ISBN 978-0-89689-683-3.
- Cuhaj, George S., ed. (2012). Canadian Coin Digest (2 ed.). Krause. ISBN 978-1-4402-2985-5.
- Coins of Canada by J.A. Haxby & R.C. Willey.
