= Newfoundland dollar =

Currency of Newfoundland before joining Canada

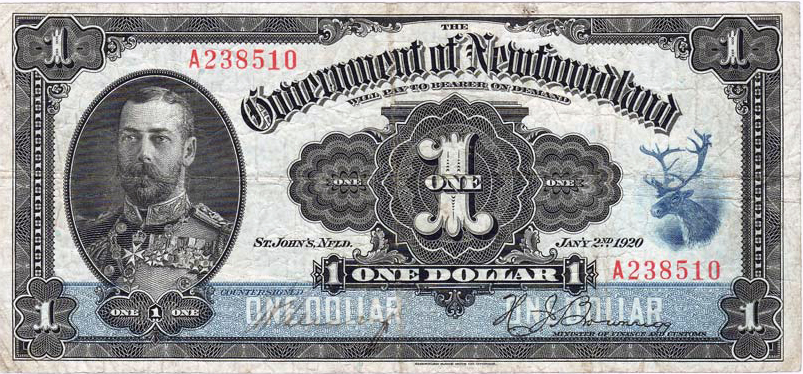
- $1

Unit
- Symbol: $ or NF$

Denominations
- Subunit
- 1/100: cent
- Symbol
- cent: ¢
- Banknotes: 25¢; 40¢; 50¢; 80¢; $1; $2; $5; $10; $20; $50
- Coins: 1¢; 5¢; 10¢; 20¢; 25¢; 50¢; $2

Demographics
- Replaced: Newfoundland pound
- Replaced by: Canadian dollar
- User(s): Newfoundland

Issuance
- Central bank: Department of Finance and Customs

Valuation
- Pegged with: Canadian dollar at par
- This infobox shows the latest status before this currency was rendered obsolete.

The dollar was the currency of the colony of Newfoundland and, later, the Dominion of Newfoundland, from 1865 until 1949, when Newfoundland became a province of Canada. It was subdivided into 100 cents.

== History ==
In 1865, Newfoundland adopted the gold standard, and the dollar replaced the pound at a rate of 1 dollar = 4 shillings 2 pence sterling or 1 pound = $4.80, slightly higher than the Canadian dollar (worth 4s 1.3d). The significance of this rating was that two cents was equal to one penny sterling. It was seen as a compromise between adopting the British system or the American system. It also aligned the Newfoundland unit to the dollar unit in the British Eastern Caribbean colonies. The West Indian dollar was directly descended from the Spanish dollar (pieces of eight). Newfoundland was unique in the British Empire in that it was the only part to introduce its own gold coin in conjunction with its gold standard. Newfoundland two-dollar coins were minted intermittently until the Newfoundland banking crash of 1894. In 1895, following this banking crisis, the Canadian banks moved into Newfoundland and the value of the Newfoundland dollar was adjusted to set it equal to the Canadian dollar, a devaluation of 1.4%. The Newfoundland dollar was replaced by the Canadian dollar at par when Newfoundland joined Canada in 1949.

The other British North American colonies adopted the American unit around the same time that Newfoundland adopted the West Indian unit. The small disparity between the American unit and the West Indian unit was because in 1792, Alexander Hamilton at the U.S. Treasury Department took an average weight of worn Spanish dollars to be the new American unit of currency.

The Newfoundland decimal coinage corresponded exactly to the dollar unit that was used in another British colony in South America. British Guiana used accounts based on the Spanish dollar, but these accounts were used in conjunction with the sterling coinage.

Coins of the Newfoundland dollar continue to be legal tender in all of Canada, as are banknotes.

== Coins ==
In 1865, coins were introduced in denominations of 1, 5, 10 and 20 cents, and 2 dollars. The 1 cent was struck in bronze, the 5, 10 and 20 cents in silver and the 2 dollars (also denominated as "Two Hundred Cents" and "One Hundred Pence") in gold. Silver 50 cents were introduced in 1870, with the 20 cents replaced by a 25-cent coin in 1917. A smaller 1-cent coin was introduced in 1938.

== Banknotes ==
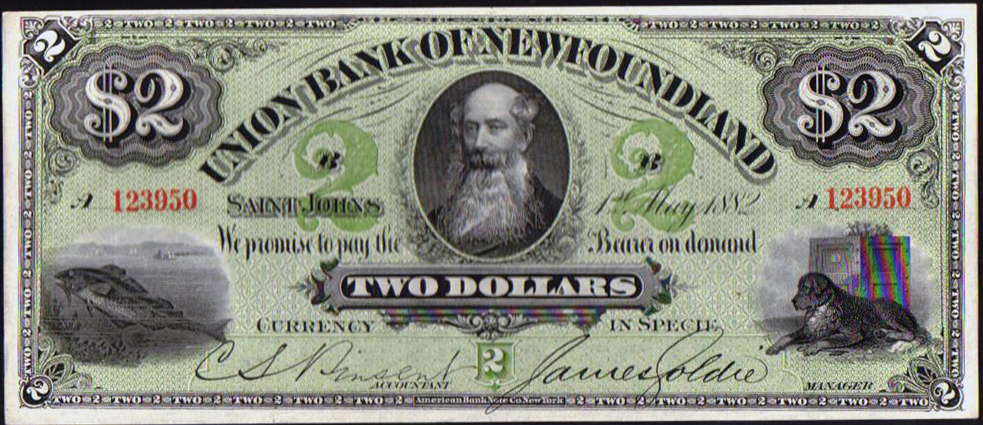
Union Bank $2 note

In 1865, one chartered bank, the Commercial Bank of Newfoundland, began issuing notes denominated in pounds and dollars, using a rate of 4 dollars = 1 pound. As this rate matched the rate used in Canada at the time, it may be that these notes were not intended for use as Newfoundland dollars. In the 1880s, both the Commercial Bank and the Union Bank of Newfoundland issued notes denominated solely in dollars. Denominations of 2, 5, 10, 20 and 50 dollars were issued. However, in 1894, both banks crashed.

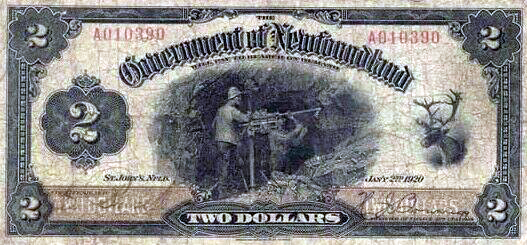
Treasury $2 note

The Department of Public Works introduced government cash notes in 1901 in denominations of 40, 50 and 80 cents, 1 and 5 dollars. In 1910, 25 cents and 2 dollars were added. In 1920, the Treasury introduced 1- and 2-dollar notes.

== Gold standard ==
The Newfoundland dollar was linked to the Canadian dollar and remained convertible to gold even after Canada went off the gold standard in April 1931. As a result of going off the gold standard and the economic situation of the Depression, the Canadian dollar slipped against the American dollar. That opened up the opportunity for a one-way arbitrage market with the United States. It became profitable to convert Canadian dollars for gold in Newfoundland and then take the gold to the United States to sell for a profit. This brought economic pressure on Newfoundland as its gold reserves started to diminish.

In December 1931, the Newfoundland government took Newfoundland off the gold standard. This was followed by legislation in the spring of 1932, which amended the Currency Act to prohibit the export of gold without a permit. Banknotes became legal tender, and notes were no longer convertible into gold. Newfoundland thus abandoned the gold standard a year after Canada.

== See also ==
- Newfoundland pound
- Banknotes of the Commercial Bank of Newfoundland
