= Newfoundland 2-dollar coin =

19th-century coin of Newfoundland

Two dollars
- Newfoundland Colony
- Value: 2.00 NFD
- Mass: 3.33 g
- Diameter: 17.98 mm
- Edge: Reeded
- Composition: 91.7% Au, 8.3% Cu
- Years of minting: 1865, 1870, 1872, 1880–82, 1885, 1888

Obverse
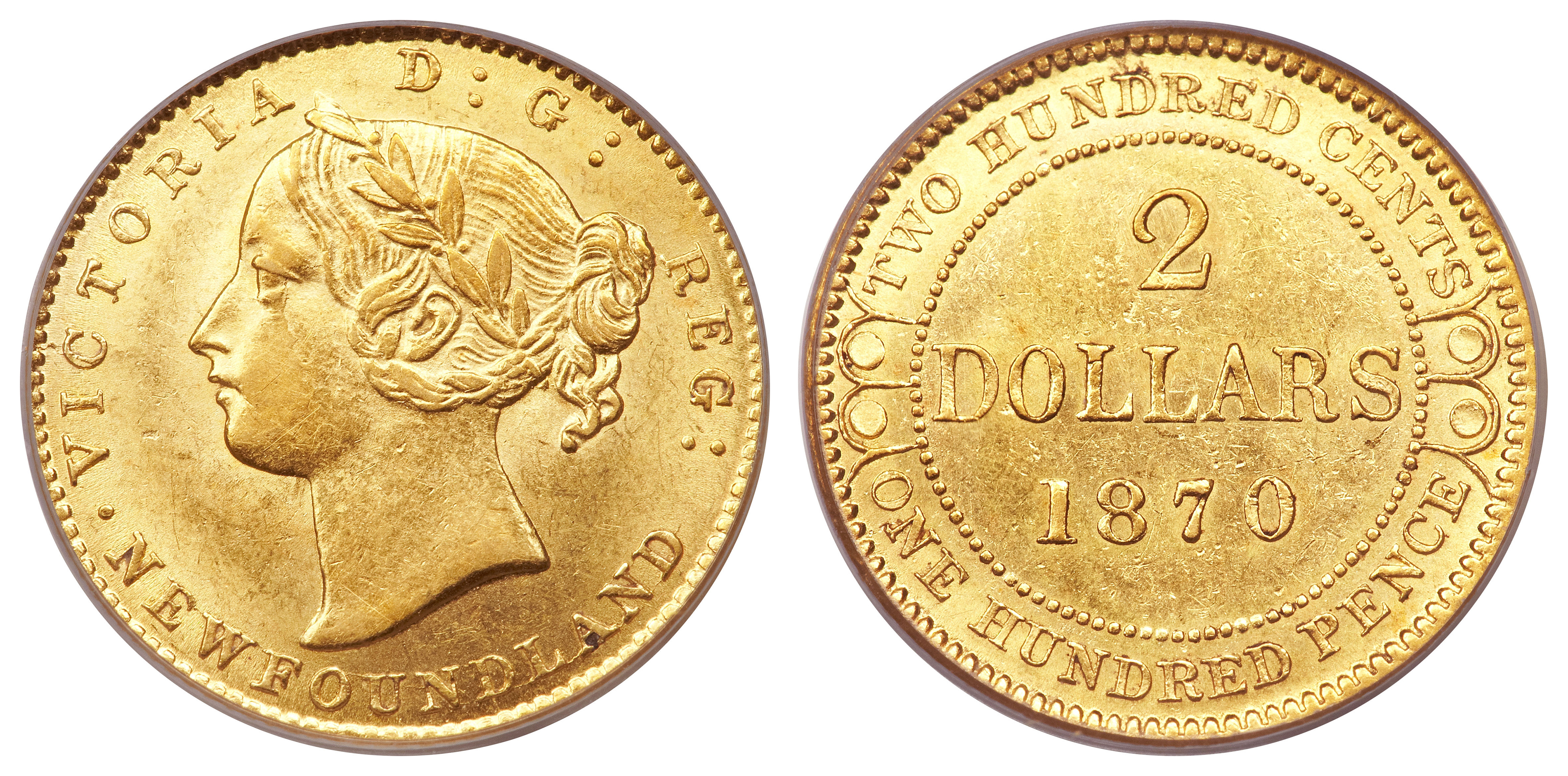
- Design: Queen Victoria
- Designer: Leonard Charles Wyon

Reverse
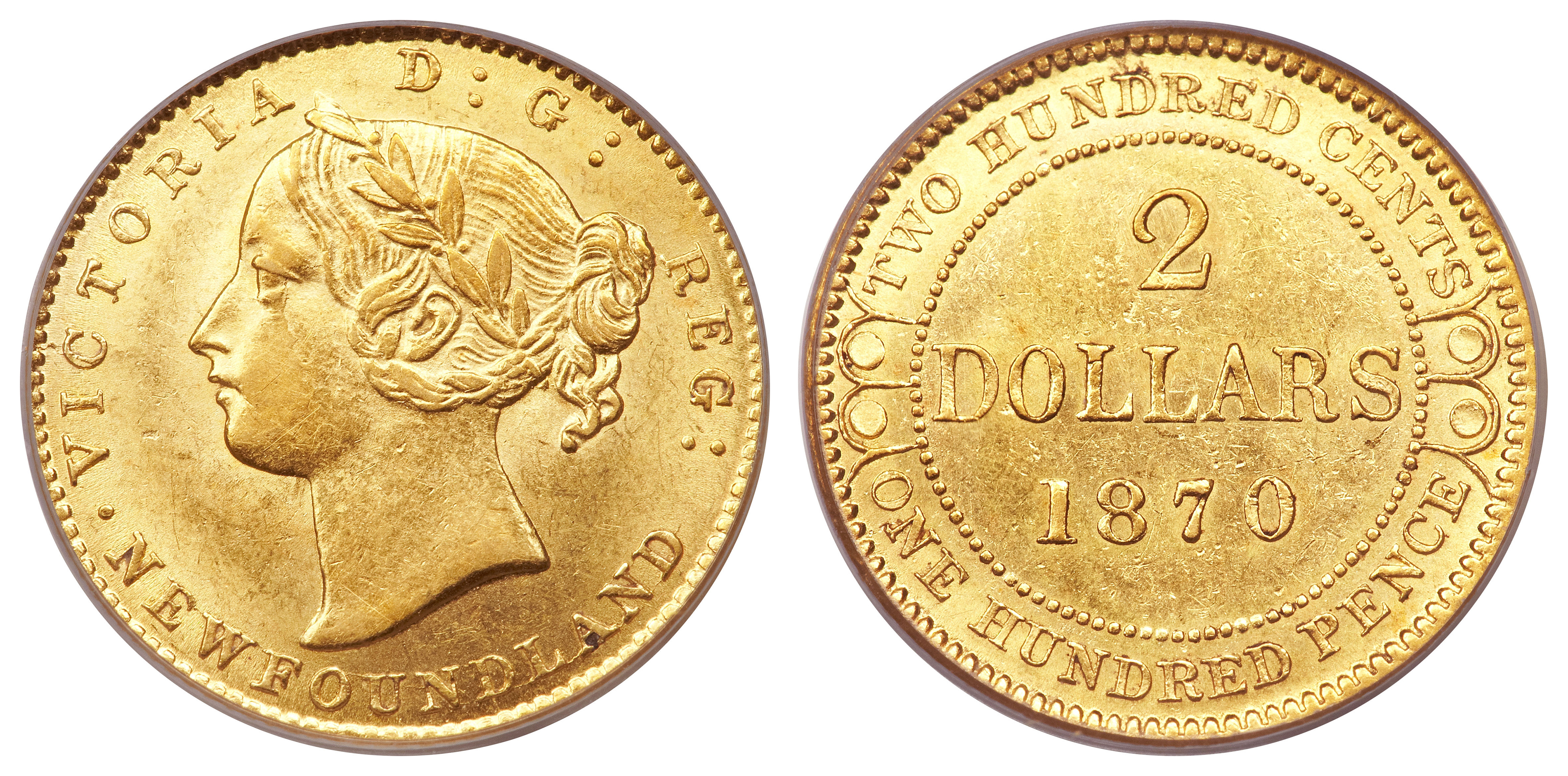
- Design: Geometric/inscription
- Designer: Leonard Charles Wyon

The Newfoundland 2-dollar coin was issued in intermittent years between 1865 and 1888. It was the only circulation gold coin issued by a British colony. Although few coins were issued, it was broadly used in Newfoundland and eastern Canada. The coin became scarce in 1894 because of hoarding following the collapse of Newfoundland's banks and monetary system.

== Background ==
Prior to Canadian Confederation in 1867, provinces and colonies had separate currencies. Having been a colony from its founding in 1610 until 1907, and then a dominion prior to joining Canada, Newfoundland had its own currency, the Newfoundland dollar, until 1949. Newfoundland began to issue its own decimal currency in 1865. The original plans for the new Newfoundland coinage suggested including a gold dollar. Over concerns that it would be easily lost as a result of its small size and value, the denomination of the gold coin was increased to two dollars.

== Description ==
The resulting two-dollar coin had a diameter of 17.98 mm, the same as the ten-cent coin—in comparison, a modern Canadian dime has a diameter of 18.03 mm. The obverse design had Queen Victoria. There was one principal portrait of Victoria, but a different one was used in 1865 and 1870, and a third one was used in 1882 and 1888. The reverse was notable in that three equivalent denominations were indicated: 2 dollars, 200 cents, and 100 pence. The third value was the equivalent in sterling.

== History ==
Issued in various years between 1865 and 1888, few two-dollar coins were struck. The highest annual mintage was 25,000 in 1882 and 1888, while coins struck in 1880 are particularly rare because of a mintage of only 2,500. With the exception of the 1882 issue, struck at the Heaton Mint and bearing the mint mark "H", all of the coins were minted in London.

Newfoundland's two-dollar coin was broadly used not only in Newfoundland, but also in Eastern Canada in general. The supply of the coins "virtually disappeared" in 1894, when Newfoundland's banks and monetary system collapsed. With paper banknotes being distrusted, the gold coins were hoarded, as well as two of the next-highest Newfoundland denominations, the silver 50-cent and 20-cent pieces.

== Significance ==
With its two-dollar coin, Newfoundland became the only British colony to issue circulating gold coinage apart from the Sydney Mint, which issued Australian sovereigns from 1855 onwards. Gold coinage was used in Canada and other British domains. For example, in the late 18th and early 19th centuries, common gold coins included coins from Portugal, British guineas or sovereigns, French Louis d'or, American eagles, Spanish doubloons, and coins related to the eagles or doubloons. Canada issued five-dollar and ten-dollar gold coins between 1912 and 1914, which were discontinued because of World War I. At the time, Canada was a Dominion. Newfoundland's 2-dollar coin is notable in that it was issued by the colony itself, not having yet gained independence. While other contemporary British colonies (e.g. the British Raj) had gold coinage, Newfoundland was under responsible government; in the context of Canada, that resulted in Newfoundland being a self-governing colony, free to make its own decisions on internal matters, such as coinage, independently of the UK government.

== Mintages ==
Date	Mintage
1865	10,000
1870	10,000
1872	6,050
1880	2,500
1881	10,000
1882H	25,000
1885	10,000
1888	25,000
