= Half dollar =

Half-unit of currencies named "dollar"

The term "half dollar" refers to a half-unit of several currencies that are named "dollar". One dollar ($1) is normally divided into subsidiary currency of 100 cents, so a half dollar is equal to 50 cents. Although more than a dozen countries have their own unique dollar currency, not all of them use a 50 cent piece or half dollar. This article only includes half dollars and 50 cent pieces that were intended for circulation, those that add up to units of dollars, and those in the form of a coin.

- Note: The blue linked years included in the tables link to articles about the coins.

== Currently minted ==
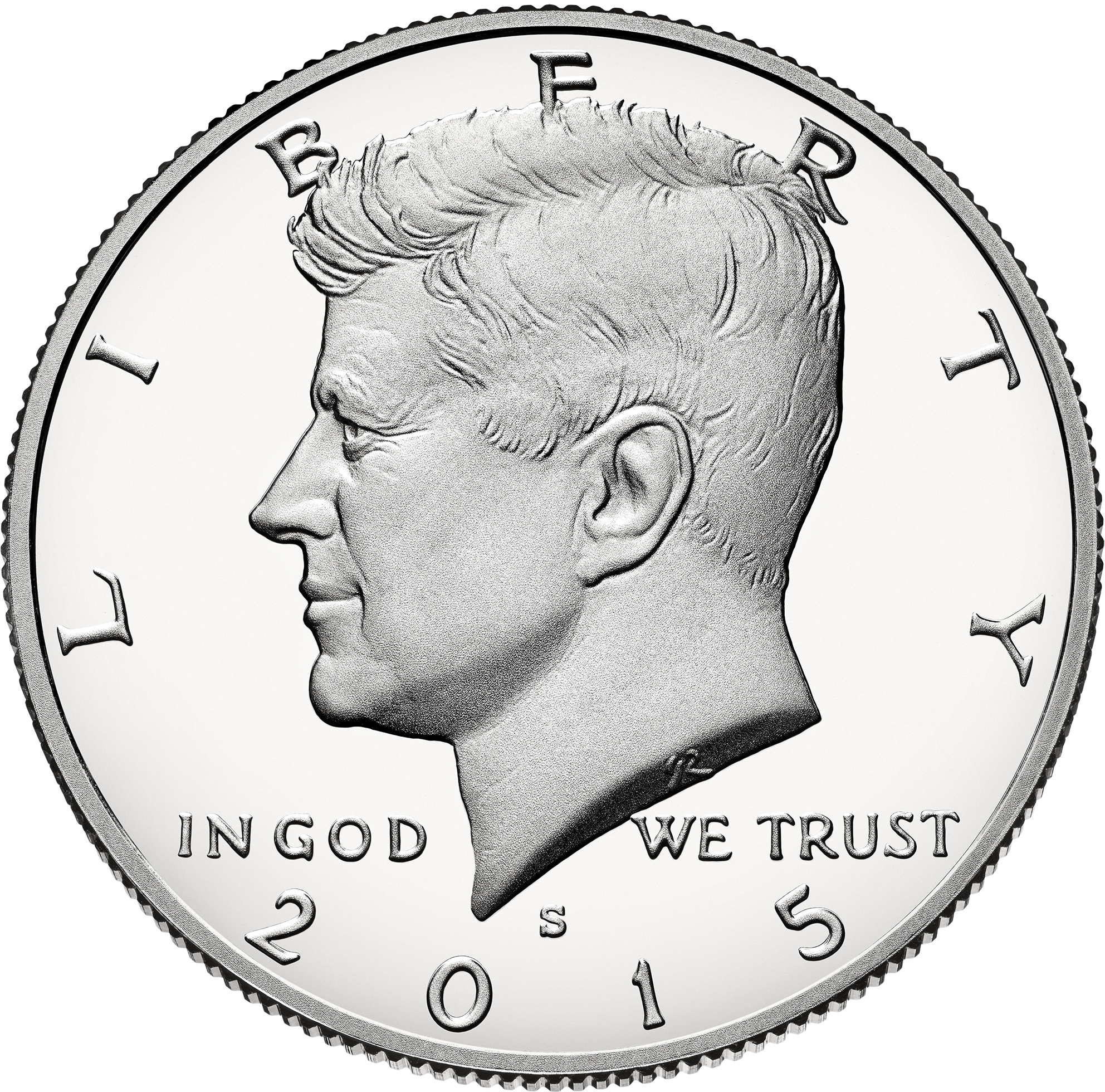
The obverse side of a United States half dollar

Circulating half dollars by country
Country(s) / City	Unit of currency	Technical parameters				Description			Date of first minting (Note: Some countries have had many varieties and forms of half dollars/50 cent pieces. The dates used in this table reflect when the current form (design/metal base) was first issued.)
Country(s) / City	Unit of currency	Diameter	Thickness	Weight	Composition	Edge	Obverse	Reverse	Date of first minting
Australia and its territories	AUD	31.65 mm	2.5 mm	15.55 g	Cupronickel: 75% copper 25% nickel	Plain	Queen Elizabeth II	Coat of Arms	1985
(The Bahamas) Bahamas	BSD	29 mm	N/A	10.51 g	Cupronickel: 75% copper 25% nickel	N/A	Coat of Arms	A Marlin leaping out of water.	1974
Belize	BZD	N/A	N/A	N/A	Cupronickel: 75% copper 25% nickel	N/A	Queen Elizabeth II	Ornamental - Country/Value/Date	1974
Brunei	BND	27.70 mm	N/A	7.29 g	Cupronickel: 75% copper 25% nickel	Reeded	Hassanal Bolkiah	Coat of Arms	1993
Canada (Note: Half dollars from this country no longer circulate as they are minted in small amounts for collectors who purchase them at a premium)	CAD	27.13 mm	1.95 mm	6.9 g	93.15% steel, 4.75% copper, 2.1% nickel plating	Milled	Queen Elizabeth II	Coat of Arms	2000
Fiji	FJD	N/A	N/A	N/A	Cupronickel: 75% copper 25% nickel	N/A	A Humphead wrasse	A takia	2012
Hong Kong	HKD	22.5 mm	1.72 mm	4.92 g	Brass-plated steel	Milled	Bauhinia	Value	1993
Liberia	LRD	N/A	N/A	9.0 g	Nickel Clad Steel	N/A	William R. Tolbert Jr.	Coat of Arms & Motto	2000
New Zealand and others.	NZD	24.75 mm	1.70 mm	5.0g	Nickel-plated steel	Plain	Queen Elizabeth II	HMS Endeavour	1999
Singapore	SGD	23 mm	2.45 mm	6.56 g	Nickel-plated steel	Scalloped	Coat of Arms	Port of Singapore	2013
Solomon Islands	SBD	N/A	N/A	N/A	Cupronickel: 75% copper 25% nickel	N/A	Queen Elizabeth II	Coat of Arms	2012
Trinidad and Tobago	TTD	N/A	N/A	N/A	Cupronickel: 75% copper 25% nickel	N/A	Coat of Arms	Value	1976
United States and others	USD	30.61 mm	2.15 mm	11.34 g	Cupronickel: 75% copper 25% nickel	Reeded	John F. Kennedy	USA Presidential Seal	1971

== Formerly minted ==
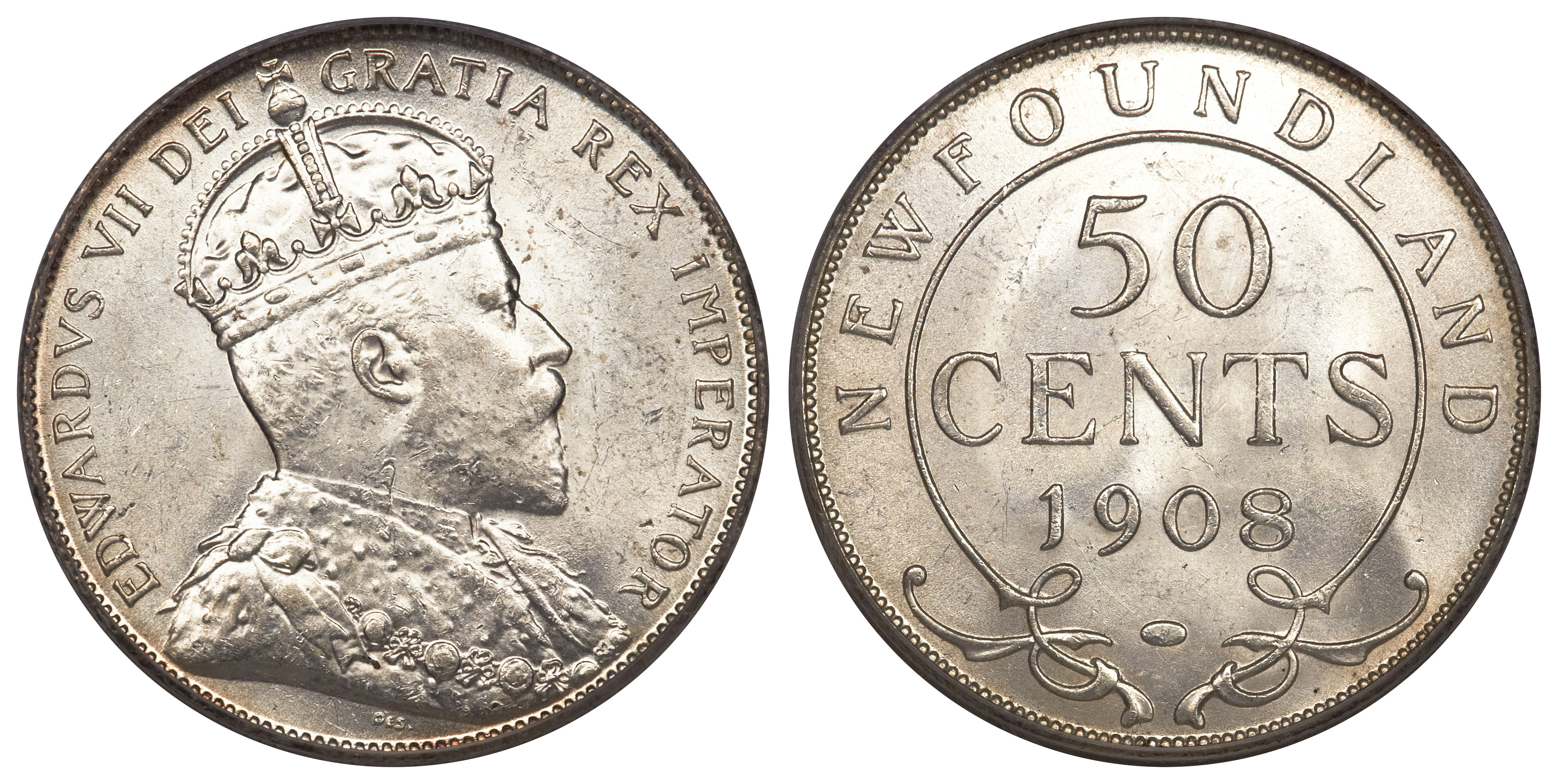
Newfoundland 50-cent piece from 1908 depicting King Edward VII

Former half dollars by country
Country(s) / City	Unit of currency	Technical parameters				Description			Introduced	Withdrawn
Country(s) / City	Unit of currency	Diameter	Thickness	Weight	Composition	Edge	Obverse	Reverse	Introduced	Withdrawn
Bermuda	BMD	30.5 mm	N/A	12.60 g	75% copper 25% nickel	Milled	Queen Elizabeth II	Coat of arms	1970	1990
Confederate States of America	CSD	30.6 mm	N/A	12.44 g	90% silver 10% copper	Reeded	Seated Liberty	Peterson CSA seal	1861	1865
Cook Islands	CID	32 mm	N/A	N/A	75% copper 25% nickel	N/A	Queen Elizabeth II	Value	1972	2016
Crown Colony of North Borneo	MBBD	N/A	N/A	N/A	75% copper 25% nickel	N/A	Queen Elizabeth II	Value	1953	1969
Crown Colony of Sarawak	MBBD	N/A	N/A	N/A	75% copper 25% nickel	N/A	Queen Elizabeth II	Value	1953	1967
Dominion of Newfoundland	NFD	29.85 mm	N/A	11.78 g	92.5% silver 7.5% copper	Reeded	Reigning British Monarch	Value	1870	1949
Federation of Malaya	MBBD	N/A	N/A	N/A	75% copper 25% nickel	N/A	Queen Elizabeth II	Value	1953	1969
Hawaiian Kingdom (Note: These half dollars were also accepted as legal tender by the successive Provisional Government of Hawaii, and Republic of Hawaii governments.)	HD	N/A	N/A	N/A	90% silver 10% copper	N/A	King Kalākaua	Value	1883	1900 (Note: These coins were used until Hawaii became a U.S. territory in 1900)
Jamaica	JMD	31.37 mm	N/A	12.43 g	75% copper 25% nickel	N/A	Coat of arms	Marcus Garvey	1976	1990
Kiribati	KID	31.65 mm	N/A	N/A	75% copper 25% nickel	N/A	Coat of arms	Pandanus tree	1979	In circulation
Sarawak	SD	N/A	N/A	N/A	80% silver 20% copper (1858-1919); 40% silver 60% copper (1920-1953)	N/A	White Rajahs	N/A	1858	1953
Taiwan (Note: While 50-cent pieces have been discontinued in Taiwan, they are still legal tender.)	TWD	18 mm	N/A	3.0 g	97% copper 2.5% zinc 0.5% tin	N/A	Mei Blossom	Value	1981	Unknown
Tuvalu	TVD	32 mm	N/A	N/A	75% copper 25% nickel	N/A	Queen Elizabeth II	Octopus	1976	In circulation
West Indies Federation	BWI	N/A	N/A	N/A	75% copper 25% nickel	N/A	Queen Elizabeth II	N/A	1955	1981

== See also ==
- Fractional currency - includes 50 cent notes formerly issued by the United States.
- Confederate States dollar - includes Confederate 50 cent notes.
- Japanese invasion money - includes 50 cent notes from World War II.
- Fifty pence, a name for multiple currency demonimations also worth half of a major unit
