= Ten-cent coin =

A ten-cent coin or ten-cent piece is a coin worth 10 cents in a given currency.

Notable examples include:

- the dime, ten-cent coin of the United States
- the dime, ten-cent coin of Canada
- the Australian ten-cent coin
- the New Zealand ten-cent coin
- the Hong Kong ten-cent coin
- the dubbeltje, former ten-cent coin of the decimal Dutch guilder (Netherlands)
- Ten cent coin (Netherlands 1926–1941)
- Ten cent coin (Netherlands 1941–1943)
- the 10 euro cent coin used in several European countries known as the eurozone
- Newfoundland ten cents

== See also ==
- 10 cents (disambiguation)
- Category:Ten-cent coins
