= Newfoundland one cent =

Coin

One-cent Newfoundland type set

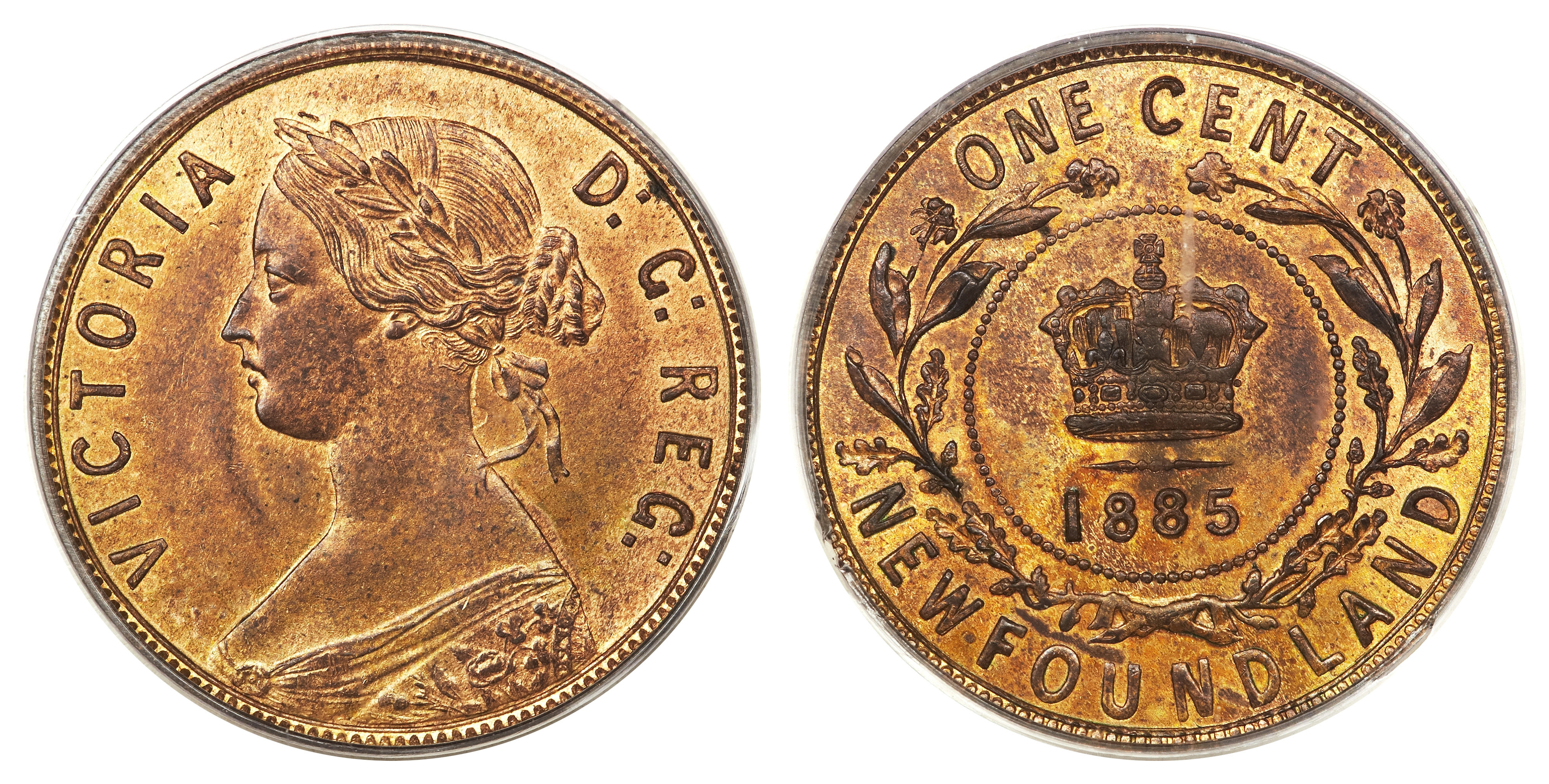
Victoria Cent (1885)

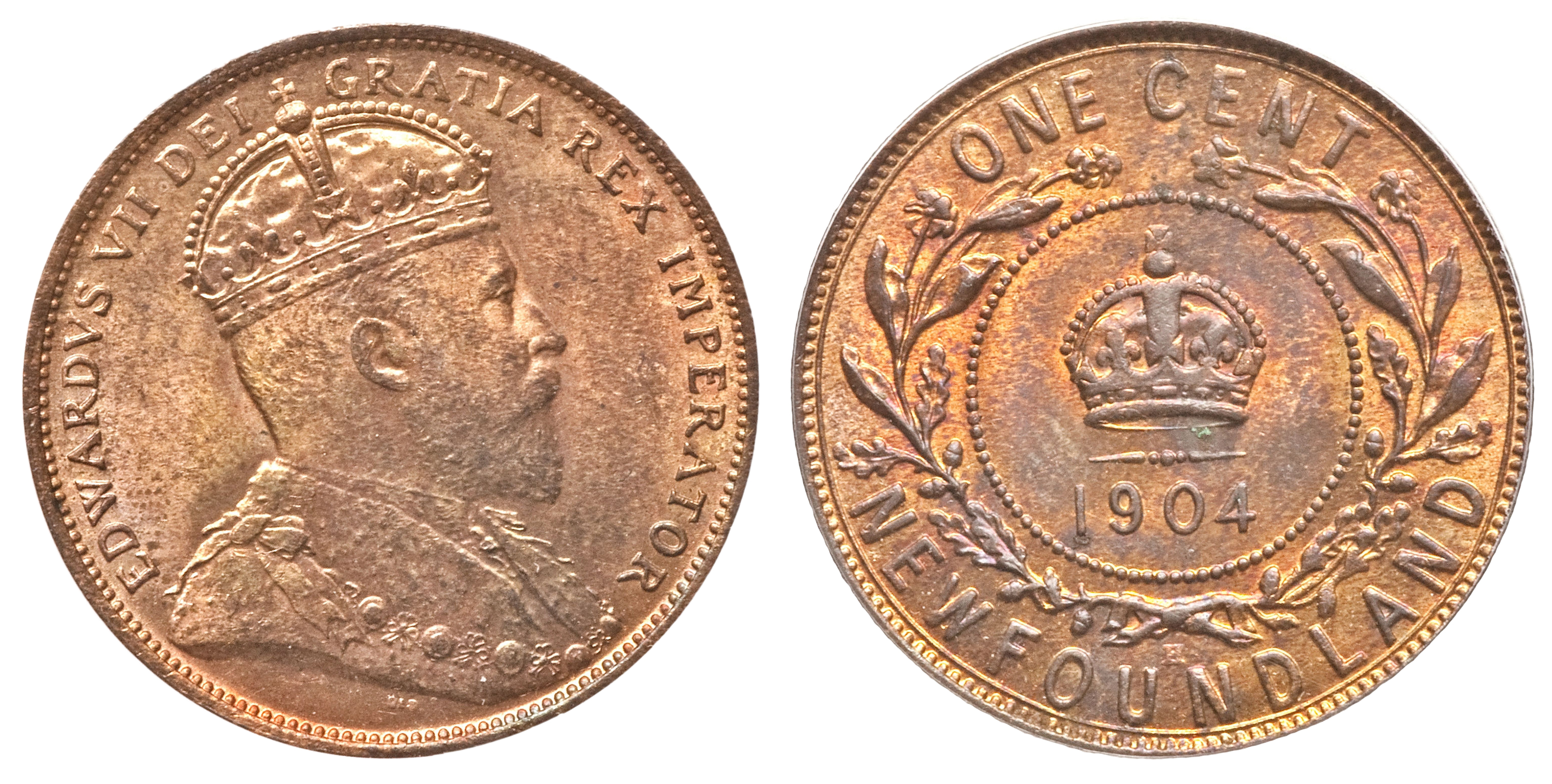
Edward VII Cent (1904)

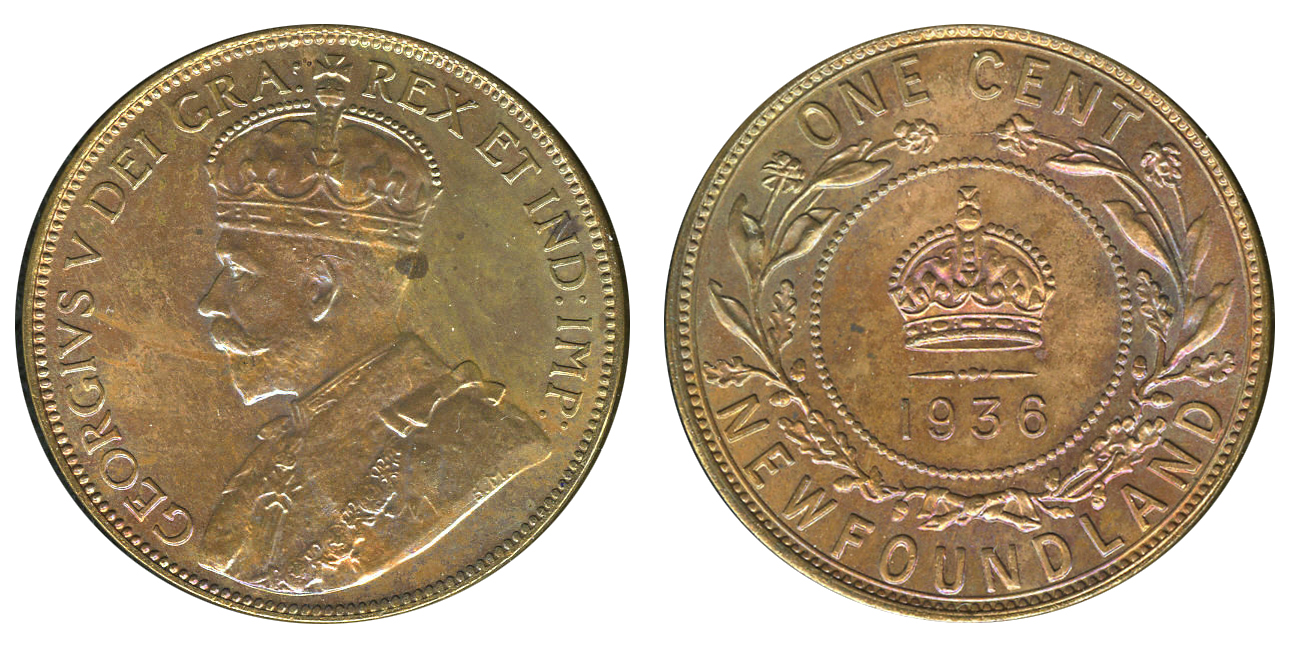
George V Cent (1936)

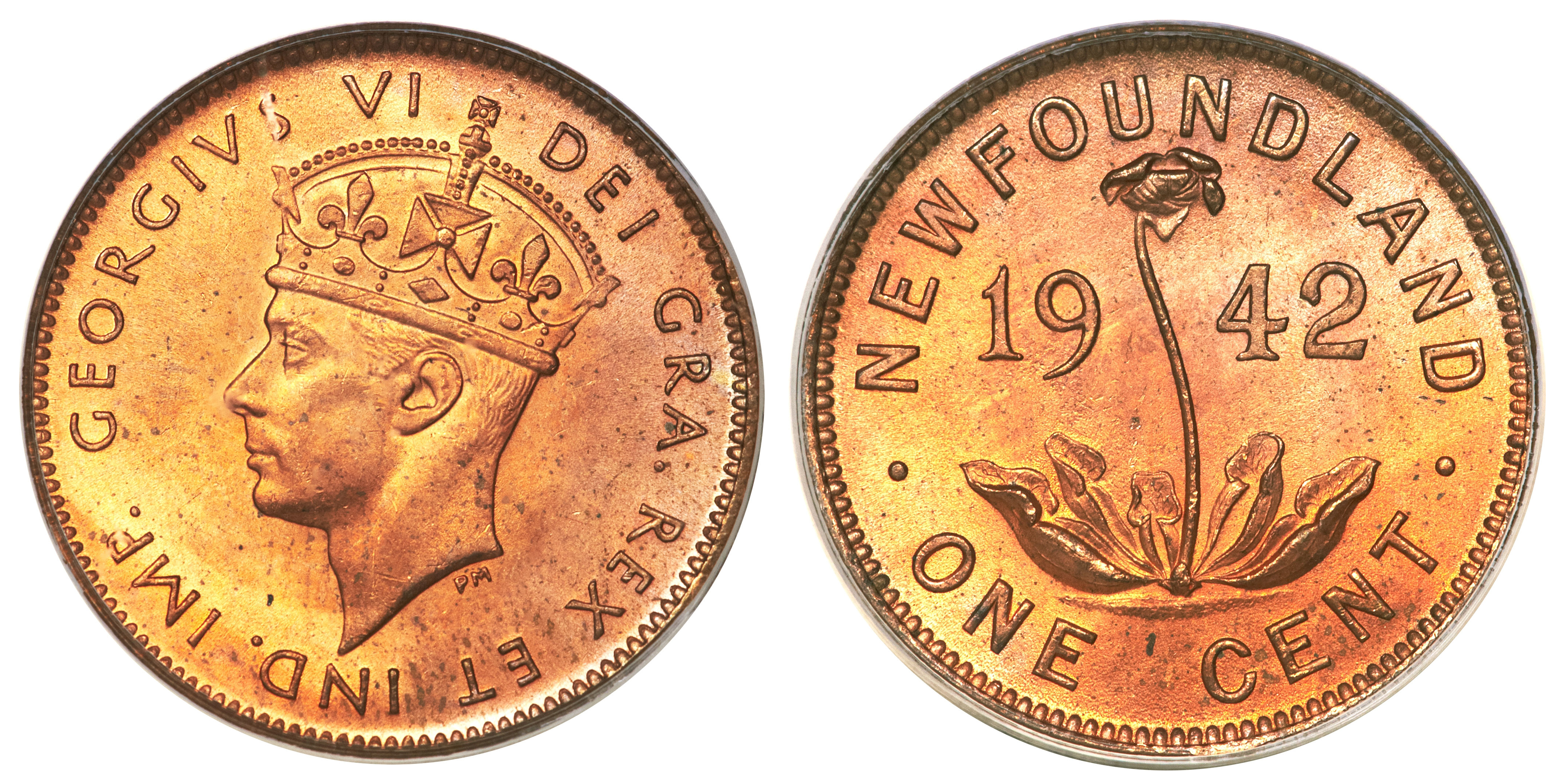
George VI Cent (1942)

As Newfoundland did not join Canada until 1949, it had its own currency for many decades. It adopted its own decimal currency in 1863. Compared to other pre-Confederation British colonies, it had a wide selection of decimal coinage (including a twenty cent coin). The most important coin in Newfoundland was the Spanish American dollar (the 8-real piece), therefore, the Newfoundland government set its dollar equal in value to this coin. The new decimal cent was equal to the British halfpenny and $4.80 was equal to one pound sterling.

== Queen Victoria Laureated Portrait, 1865–1876 ==
=== Specifications ===
| Years | Designers | Engraver | Composition | Weight | Diameter |
|---|---|---|---|---|---|
| 1865–1876 | Leonard C. Wyon and Horace Morehen | Thomas J. Minton | .95 copper, .04 tin, .01 zinc | 5.67 grams | 25.53 mm |

=== Mintages ===
| Year and Mint Mark | Mintage |
|---|---|
| 1865 | 240,000 |
| 1872H | 200,000 |
| 1873 | 200,000 |
| 1876H | 200,000 |

=== 1880–1896 ===
Varieties of 1880: Three date varieties exist for 1880. The first has a narrow 0 in the date, while the second and the third have a wide 0 in different positions. Position of the Wide 0 would be either evenly placed or low compared to the other numbers.

=== Mintages ===
| Year and Mint Mark | Mintage |
|---|---|
| 1880 | 400,000 |
| 1885 | 40,000 |
| 1888 | 50,000 |
| 1890 | 200,000 |
| 1894 | 200,000 |
| 1896 | 200,000 |

== Edward VII 1904–1909 ==
The reverse design was a slight modification of the Victorian reverse. Instead of the Imperial State Crown, it was replaced by St. Edward's crown. The effigy of King Edward VII was similar to most Canadian coins of the era. The difference with the Newfoundland coinage is that the bust on the effigy is larger and the letter size in the legend is very small.

=== Specifications ===
| Designer | Engraver | Composition | Weight | Diameter |
|---|---|---|---|---|
| G. W. DeSaulles | W. H. J. Blakemore | .95 copper, .04 tin, .01 zinc | 5.67 grams | 25.53 mm |

=== Mintages ===
| Date and Mint Mark | Mintage |
|---|---|
| 1904H | 100,000 |
| 1907 | 200,000 |
| 1909 | 200,000 |

== George V 1913–1936 ==
The reverse for these coins is exactly the same as those for the Edward VII coins. The effigy of King George V was the same as the effigies for Canadian coins. Any coins that were manufactured at the Ottawa Mint have a C Mint Mark to signify it.

=== Specifications ===
| Designer | Engraver | Composition (1913–1920) | Composition (1926–1936) | Weight | Diameter (1913, 1929–1936) | Diameter (1917–1920) |
|---|---|---|---|---|---|---|
| Sir E .B. MacKennal | Sir E. B. MacKennal | .95 copper, .04 tin, .01 zinc | .955 copper, .030 tin, .015 zinc | 5.67 grams | 25.53 mm | 25.40 mm |

=== Mintages ===
| Date and Mint Mark | Mintage |
|---|---|
| 1913 | 400,000 |
| 1917C | 702,350 |
| 1919C | 300,000 |
| 1920C | 302,184 |
| 1929 | 300,000 |
| 1936 | 300,000 |

== George VI 1938–1947 ==
In 1937, the government of Newfoundland reviewed the option of converting to a smaller cent. The arguments in favour of it were cost-related. The new reverse would feature the Pitcher plant, a plant very native to Newfoundland, although many felt that the coin was too small and the plant had an unnatural look. During World War II, Newfoundland cents were manufactured in Ottawa rather than in England. This was done to avoid the risks of transatlantic shipping. Although coins manufactured in Ottawa between 1940 and 1947 have a C Mint Mark to signify that the coins were manufactured in Ottawa, the C Mint Mark does not exist on the 1940 and 1942 issues.

=== Specifications ===
| Designer | Engraver | Composition | Weight | Diameter |
|---|---|---|---|---|
| Percy Metcalfe | Walter J. Newman | .955 copper, .030 tin, .015 zinc | 3.24 grams | 19.05 mm |

=== Mintages ===
| Date and Mint Mark | Mintage |
|---|---|
| 1938 | 500,000 |
| 1940 | 300,000 |
| 1941C | 827,662 |
| 1942 | 1,996,889 |
| 1943C | 1,239,732 |
| 1944C | 1,328,776 |
| 1947C | 313,772 |

The 1940 and 1941 both have re-engraved or repunched varieties. The whole date is sometimes visible as re-engraved and sometimes only the 4 followed by the 0 or 1. Numbers of the re engraved 1940 and 1941 struck are included in the overall mintage figures. Re-engraved varieties are much rarer and are therefore more desirable to collectors.
