= 10 cents =

Ten cents or Ten Cents may refer to:

- Ten-cent coin, a coinage value in many systems using decimal currencies
- Ten Cents (TUGS), a fictional character in children's television series, TUGS
- Tencent, Chinese company
- I ask me mama for ten cents, traditional Jamaican kids' song
