= Newfoundland pound =

Currency

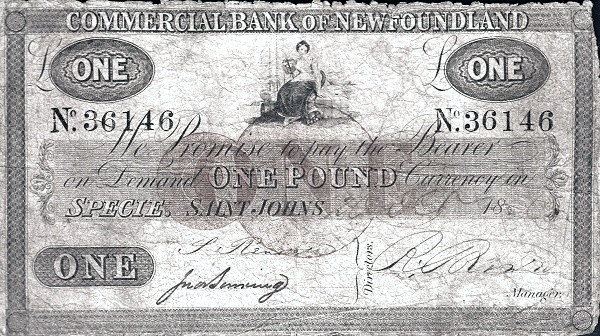

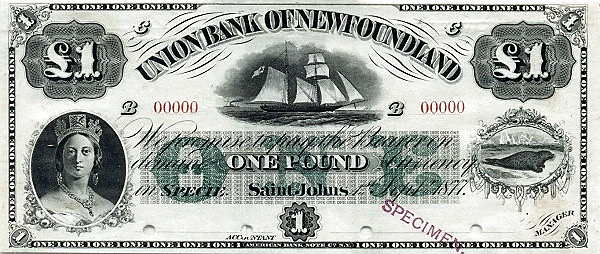

ISO 4217
- Code: GBP (numeric: 826)
- Subunit: 0.01

Unit
- Unit: pound
- Symbol: £

The pound was the currency of Newfoundland until 1865. It was subdivided into 20 shillings, each of 12 pence. The Newfoundland pound was equal to sterling and sterling coin circulated, supplemented by locally produced tokens and banknotes. In 1865, the dollar was introduced at a rate of 1 dollar = 4s.2d., or 1 dollar = 50d.

== Tokens ==
Tokens were privately produced for 1 farthing in 1829, and ½d in 1841, 1846 and 1860.

== Banknotes ==
In 1854, the Union Bank of Newfoundland introduced £1 notes. The same denomination was issued by the Commercial Bank of Newfoundland from 1857. Both banks continued to issue notes denominated in £sd after the introduction of the dollar, although they did issue dollar notes in the 1880s.

== See also ==
- Newfoundland dollar
