= Banknotes of the Commercial Bank of Newfoundland =

Banknotes were issued by the Commercial Bank of Newfoundland at various times between 1857 and 1888. The notes are quite rare.

These notes have a figure representing commerce in the centre of the notes. They were printed by Perkins, Bacon and Company, and British American Bank Note Company Limited

== Pound currency issue (1857–58) ==
- PS101. 1 pound. 25 August 1857; 20 October 1858. Black. Uniface.

a. Issued note. p. Proof note. 18xx.

- PS102. 5 pounds. 18xx. Black. Proof note.
- PS103. 10 pounds. 18xx. Black. Proof note.
- PS104. 20 pounds. 18xx. Black. Proof note.

== Dual currency issue (1865–67) ==
- PS106. 1 pound / 4 dollars. 1 January 1867. Black on blue underprint.
- PS107. 5 pounds / 20 dollars. 1 January 1867. Black on red-brown underprint.
- PS108. 10 pounds / 40 dollars. 1865; 1 January 1867. Black on green underprint.

== Dual currency issue (1874–85) ==
- PS109. 1 pound / 4 dollars. 1874–84. Like PS106.

a. 1 January 1874; 1 March 1882. b. 1 July 1884.

- PS110. 5 pounds / 20 dollars. 1874; 1885. Like PS107, but different guilloché in the centre of the note.

a. 1 January 1874. p. 1 July 1885. Proof note.

== Decimal currency issue (1881–84) ==
- PS111. 2 dollars. 1881–84. Black. Seal at left, codfish at right. Blue back.

a. 1 January 1881; 1882. b. 1 July 1884.

== Decimal currency issue (1888) ==
- PS112. 2 dollars. 3 January 1888. Black on orange underprint. Sailor at lower left, fisherman at lower right. Green back.

The following notes PS113 to PS117 have a black on green underprint and a green back.

- PS113. 2 dollars. 3 January 1888. Like PS112.
- PS114. 5 dollars. 3 January 1888. Sailor at lower left, seals at right.
- PS115. 10 dollars. 3 January 1888. Crowned portrait of Queen Victoria at lower left, sailor at lower right.

a. Issued note. b. Redemption overprint: 2 DOLLARS.

- PS116. 20 dollars. 3 January 1888. Man, woman, and telescope at lower left, dog's head at lower right.
- PS117. 50 dollars. 3 January 1888. Boy and dog at lower left, anchor at lower right.
