= Newfoundland fifty cents =

Type set of the Newfoundland 50-cent coin

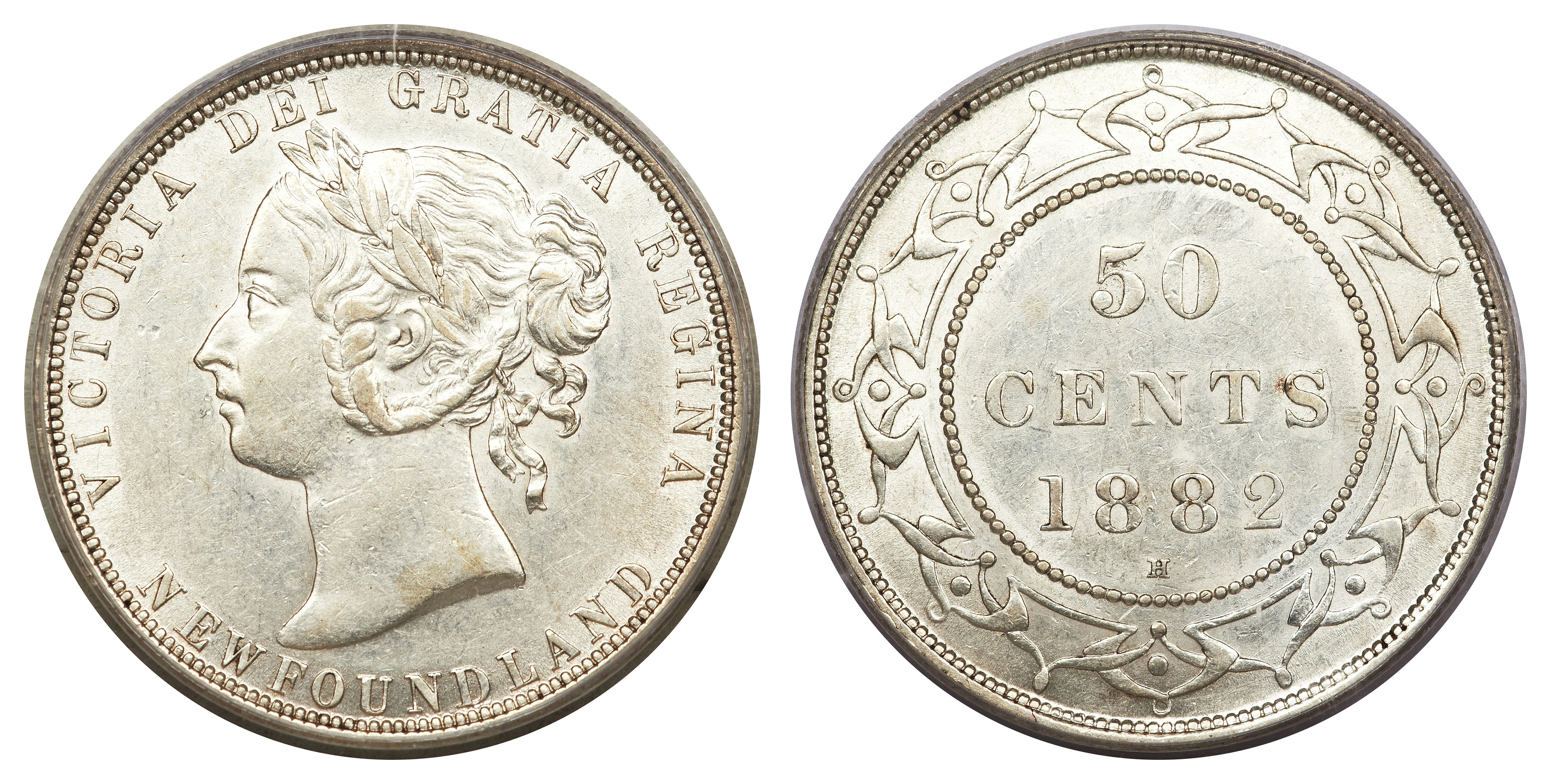
Victoria 50 Cents (1882)

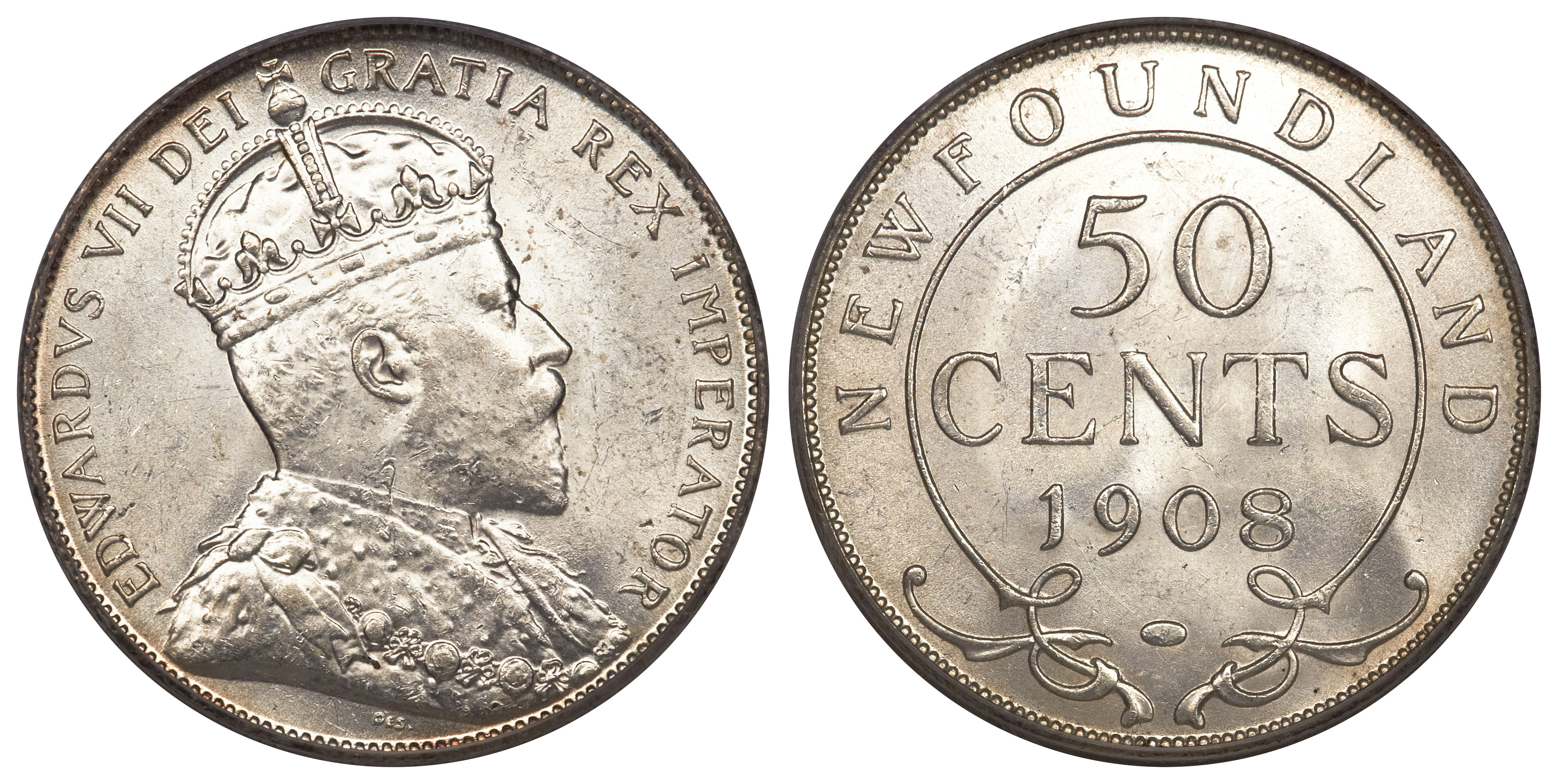
Edward VII 50 Cents (1908)

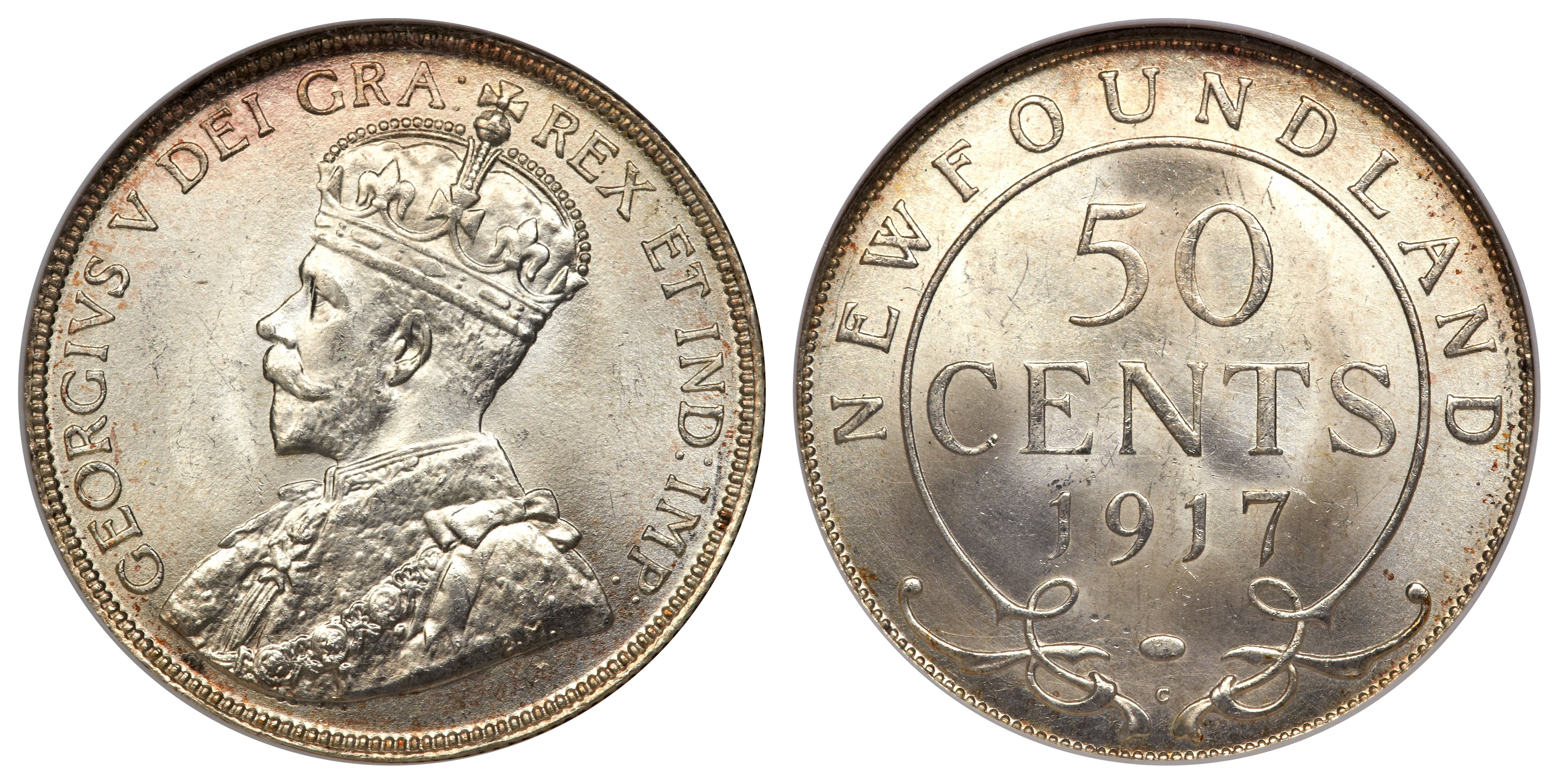
George V 50 Cents (1917)

The Newfoundland fifty cent piece was the last denomination to be added to the Victorian coinage. Its first year of issue was 1870. The laureate portrait is stylistically unlike anything used for the rest of British North America. The denomination became very popular and assumed importance after the failure of the Commercial and Union Banks of Newfoundland during the financial crisis of 1894.

== Laureated portrait, 1870-1900 ==
Specifications

Designer and Engraver	Composition	Weight	Diameter	Edge
Leonard Charles Wyon	.925 silver, .075 copper	11.78 grams	29.85 mm	Reeded

Mintages

Date and Mint Mark	Mintage
1870	50,000
1872H	48,000
1873	37,675
1874	80,000
1876H	28,000
1880	24,000
1881	50,000
1882H	100,000
1885	40,000
1888	20,000
1894	40,000
1896	60,000
1898	79,607
1899	150,000
1900	150,000

The 1896 has two varieties: with a Large W or Small W in 'Newfoundland' on the obverse. The 1898 has a couple of varieties: Obverse 1 with a Large W and Obverse 2 with a Small W. It is debated if there is an Obverse 1 with a Small W. The 1899 has two varieties: a Wide 99 or a Narrow 99. Sometimes only one of the 9's may be noticeably smaller than the other numbers.

== Edward VII, 1904-1909 ==
Specifications

Designer (Obverse)	Designer (Reverse)	Composition	Weight	Diameter	Edge
George William de Saulles	W.H.J. Blakemore	.925 silver, .075 copper	11.78 grams	29.85 mm	Reeded

Mintages

Date and Mint Mark	Mintage
1904H	140,000
1907	100,000
1908	160,000
1909	200,000

== George V, 1911-1919 ==
Specifications

Designer	Composition	Weight (1911)	Weight (1917–1919)	Diameter (1911)	Diameter (1917–1919)	Edge
Sir Edgar Bertram MacKennal	.925 silver, .075 copper	11.78 grams	11.66 grams	29.85 mm	29.72 mm	Reeded

Mintages

Date and Mint Mark	Mintage
1911	200,000
1917C	375,560
1918C	294,824
1919C	306,267
