= Newfoundland five cents =

Type set of the Newfoundland five-cent coin

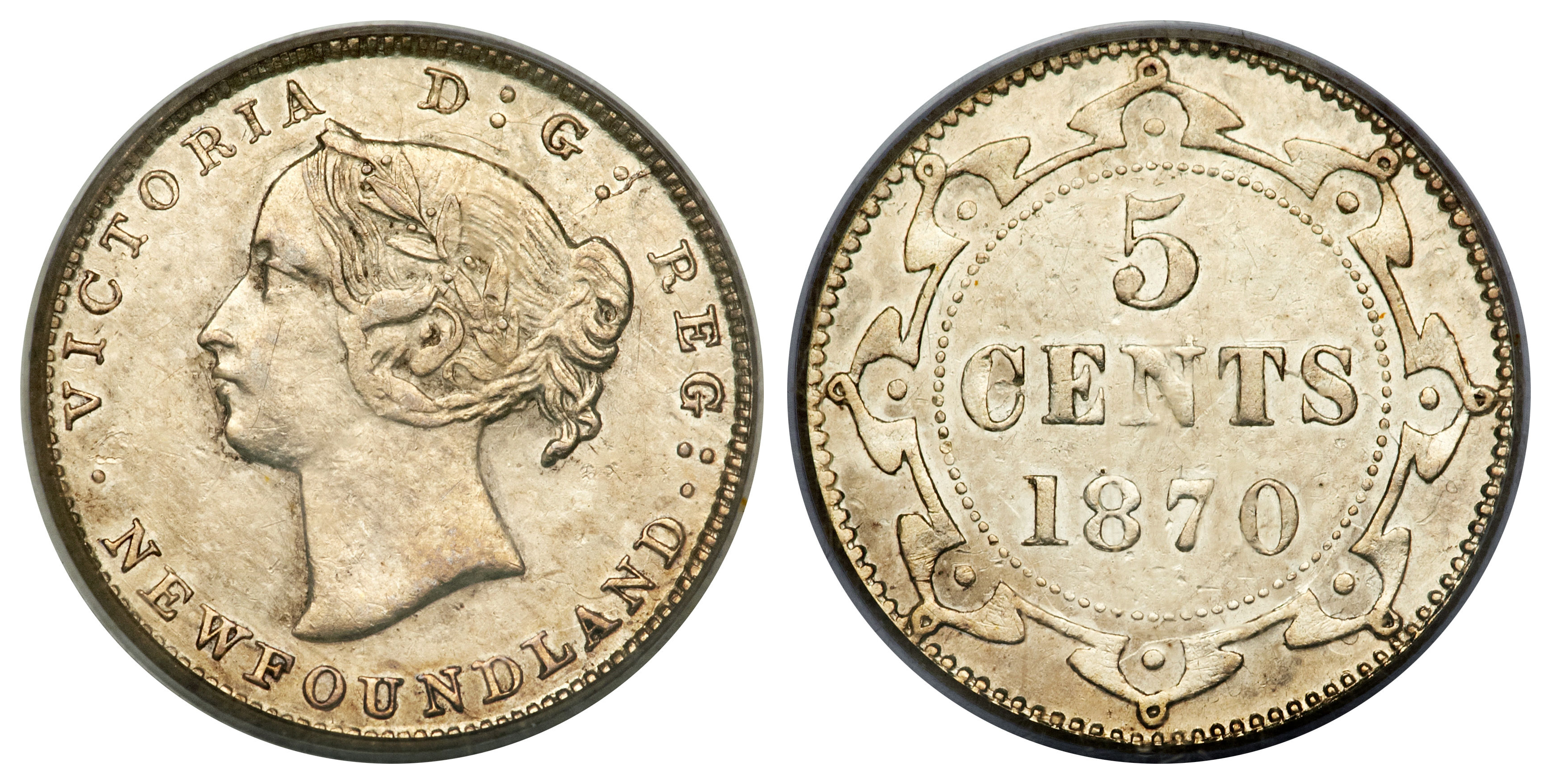
Victoria 5 Cents (1870)

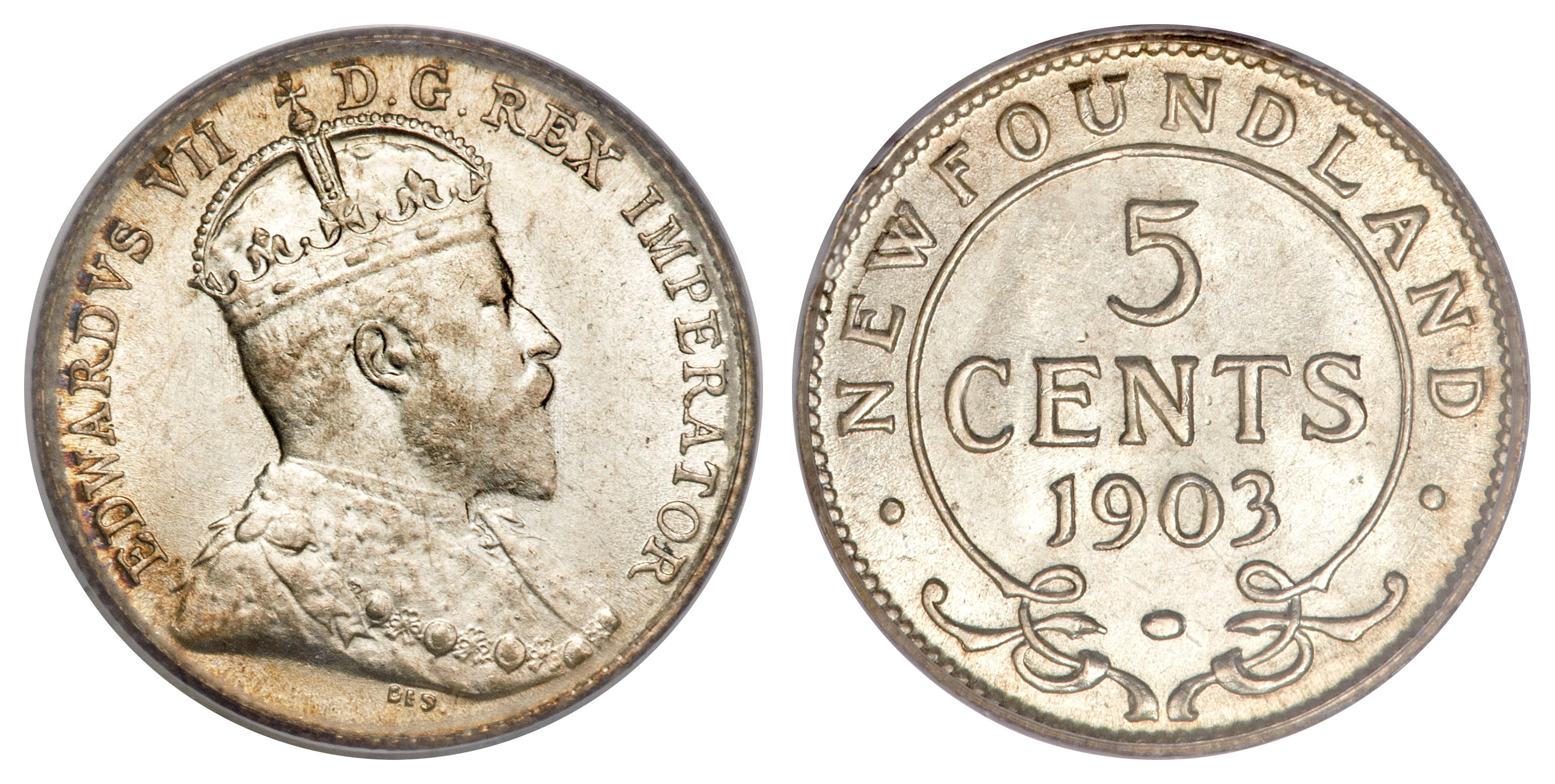
Edward VII 5 Cents (1903)

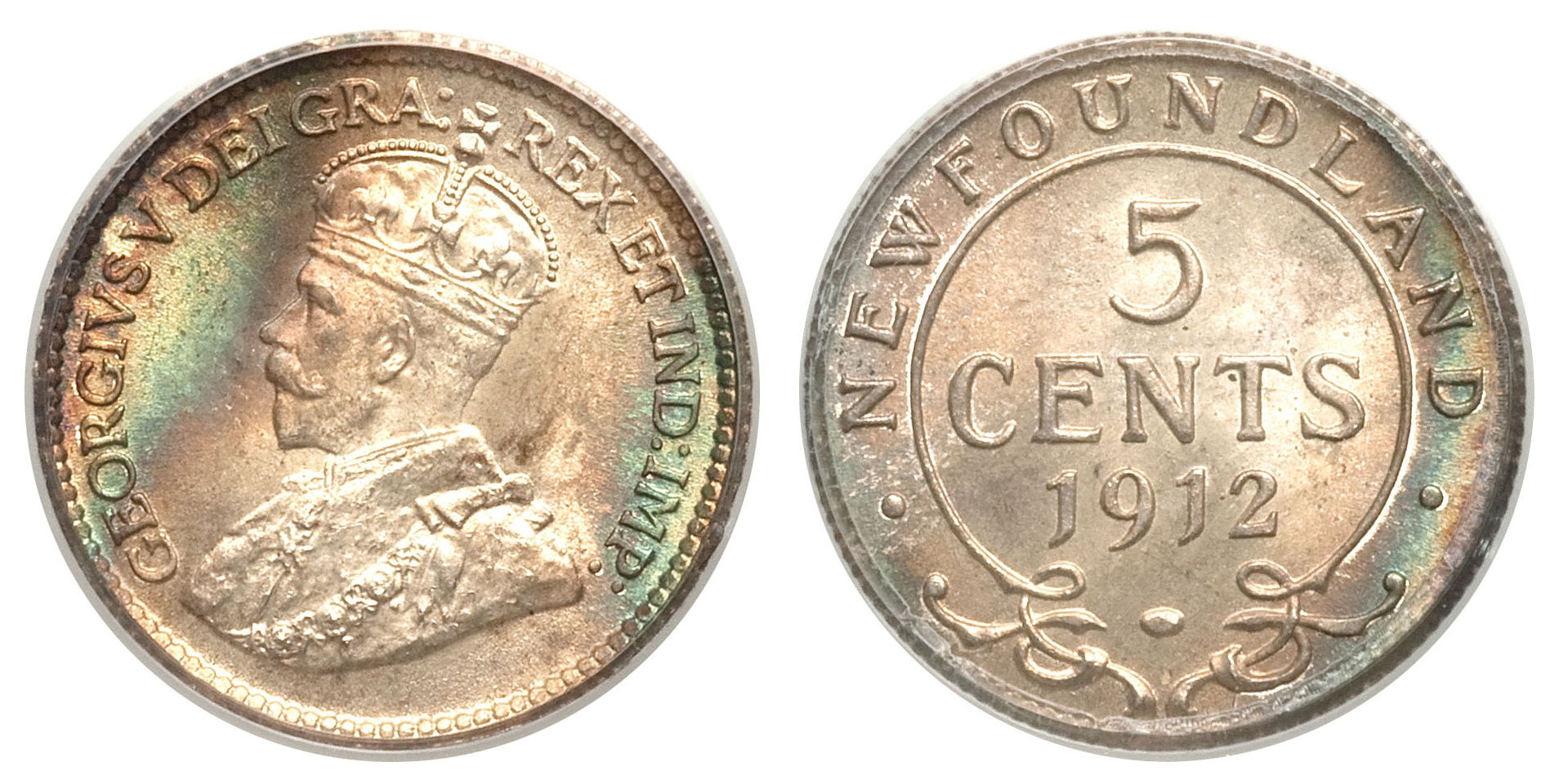
George V 5 Cents (1912)

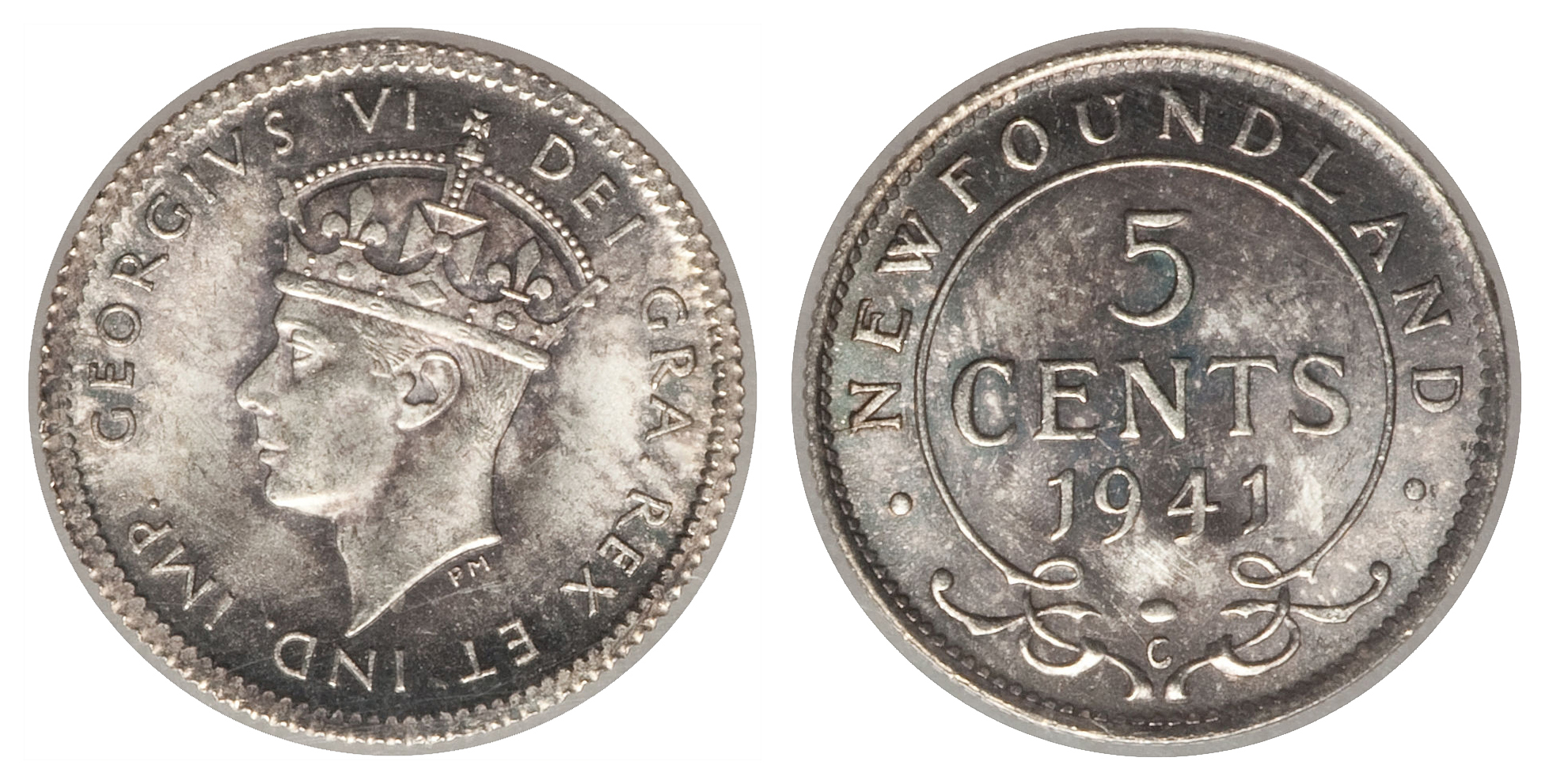
George VI 5 Cents (1941)

Work on the coinage tools for the Newfoundland five-cent coin began after the one-cent coin, so the coin has no legend. The first pattern is derived from the New Brunswick obverse with Newfoundland substituted for New Brunswick.

== Queen Victoria Laureated Portrait, 1865-1896 ==
=== Specifications ===
Years	Designers	Engraver	Composition	Weight	Diameter
1865–1876	Leonard C. Wyon	Leonard C. Wyon	.925 silver, .075 copper	1.18 grams	15.49 mm

=== Mintages ===
Year and Mint Mark	Mintage
1865	80,000
1870	40,000
1872H	40,000
1873	44,260
1876H	20,000
1880	40,000
1881	40,000
1882H	60,000
1885	16,000
1888	40,000
1890	160,000
1894	160,000
1896	400,000

== Edward VII 1903–1908 ==
The obverse for this denomination is that of the Dominion of Canada coins. The reverse, a new design by George W. DeSaulles, was one of the last coinage designs before his death.

=== Mintages ===
Date and Mint Mark	Mintage
1903	100,000
1904H	100,000
1908	400,000

== George V 1912–1929 ==
The obverse is the same as for the Dominion of Canada issue and the reverse is the same as the Newfoundland Edward VII issue.

=== Specifications ===
Designer	Engraver	Composition	Weight (1912)	Weight (1917–1929)	Diameter (1912)	Diameter (1917–1929)
Sir E.B. MacKennal	George W. DeSaulles	.925 silver, .075 copper	1.18 grams	1.17 grams	15.49 mm	15.69 mm

=== Mintages ===
Date and Mint Mark	Mintage
1912	300,000
1917C	300,319
1919C	100,844
1929	300,000

== George VI 1938-1947 ==
There was much debate as to whether the government of Newfoundland would keep producing a silver five cent coin or adopt a nickel five cent coin. Due to a strong conservative element, the decision was made to change only the cent. The reverse design was continued while the obverse had the effigy that was the standard portrait for the British colonial coinages.

The 1946 coin had the lowest mintage of any five cent coin. Published official mint reports, as well as unpublished mint accounting records, do not indicate any mintage of the five cent coin during 1946. The speculation is that the 1946 coin was actually minted in 1947. Therefore, the figures for 1946 and 1947 are considered unofficial.

=== Specifications ===
Designer	Engraver	Composition (1938–1944)	Composition (1945–1947)	Weight	Diameter (1938)	Diameter (1940–1947)
Percy Metcalfe	George W. DeSaulles	.925 silver, .075 copper	.800 silver, .200 copper	1.17 grams	15.69 mm	15.49 mm

=== Mintages ===
Date and Mint Mark	Mintage
1938	100,000
1940C	200,000
1941C	612,641
1942C	298,348
1943C	351,666
1944C	286,504
1945C	203,828
1946C	2,041
1947C	38,400
