= George William de Saulles =

George William de Saulles (4 February 1862 – 21 July 1903) was a British medallist. He designed the obverse of coins of the United Kingdom and its colonies under Queen Victoria and King Edward VII.

== Life ==
He was born on 4 February 1862 at Villa Street, Aston Manor, Birmingham. His grandfather Samuel was from Switzerland and had been a Page of the Presence in the household of George IV and William IV; his father, William Henry de Saulles, was a Birmingham glass merchant. At an early age, he began his art training at the Birmingham School of Art, under the master, Mr. Taylor. He was apprenticed to Mr. Wilcox, die-sinker, in Birmingham, under whom he had a varied practice, which included the execution of large labels for Manchester goods.

De Saulles came to London in 1884, and worked for John H. Pinches, the die-engraver, then in Oxenden Street, Haymarket. In 1888 he returned to Birmingham and worked for Joseph Moore, the medallist. During 1892, De Saulles was in London at the Royal Mint, on the death of Leonard Charles Wyon the chief engraver. In January 1893 he was gazetted "engraver to the mint", and from that time to his death produced dies for British and colonial coins and for official medals.

Engaged in the preparation of the new seal of Edward VII, De Saulles died at Chiswick, after a few days' illness, on 21 July 1903 aged 41. He was buried in Chiswick churchyard. He was married, but had no children.

== Works ==
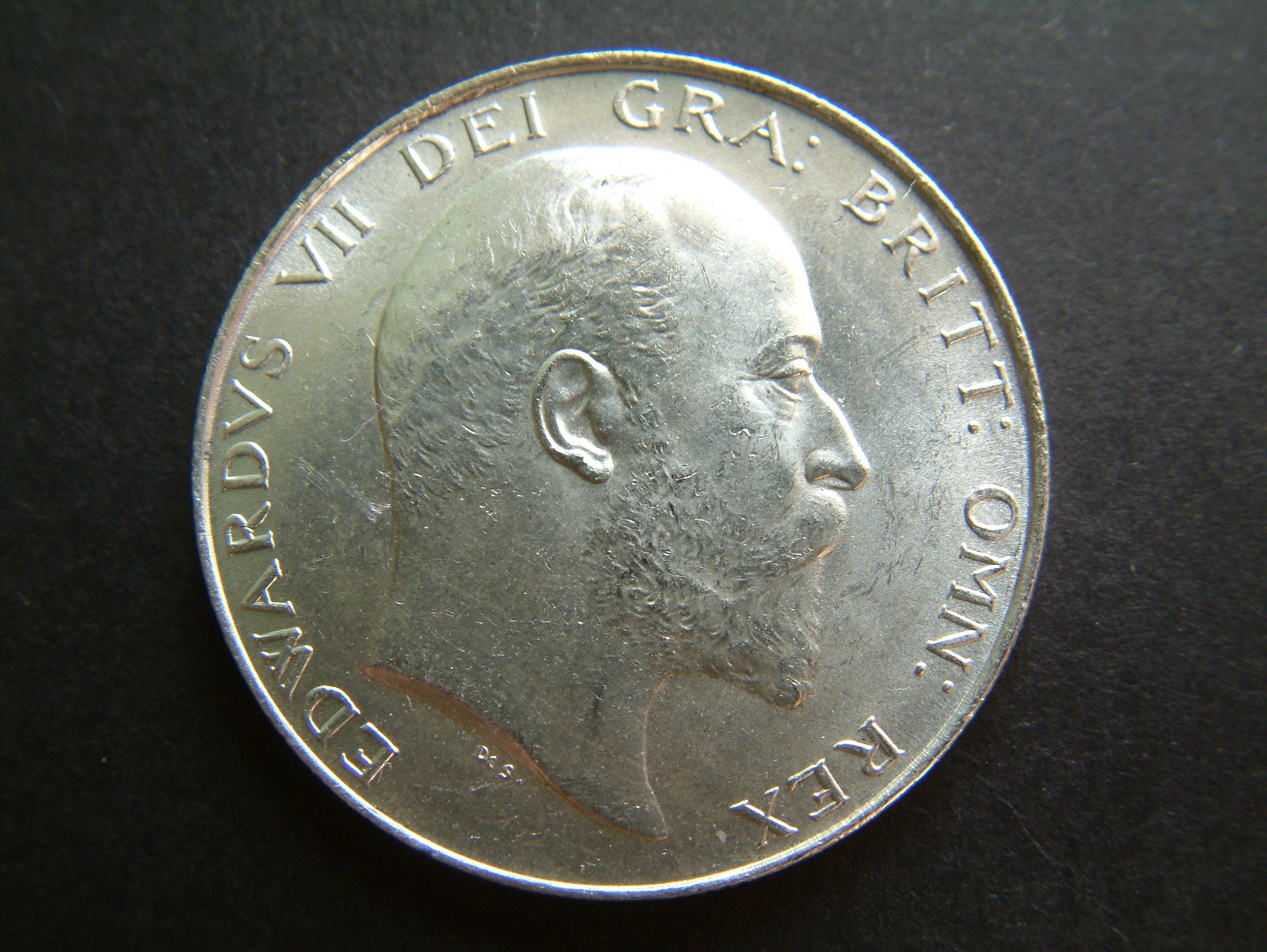
Obverse of a 1905 Edward VII halfcrown showing George William de Saulles' initials underneath the King's portrait.

Rupee coin engraved by De Saulles
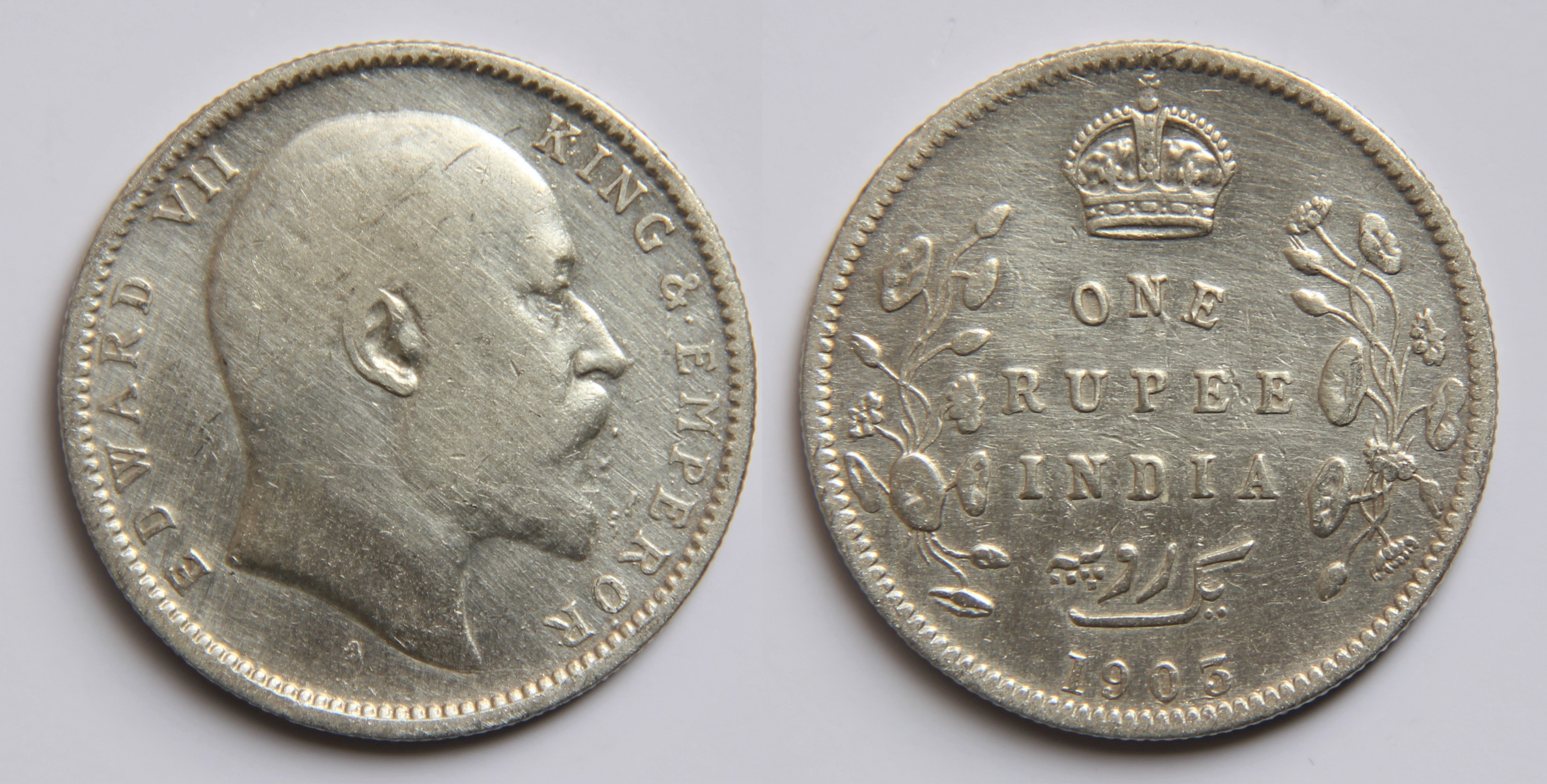
First side of the image: Obverse: Profile of King-Emperor Edward VII surrounded by his name.
Second side of the image: Reverse: Face value, country and date. Lotus flowers on each side and a crown above.
Coin made of 91.7% silver. Total 849,622,000 such coins minted between 1904 and 1910.

De Saulles as craftsman worked rapidly, and he designed, modelled and engraved most of his dies. He was somewhat influenced by the French school of Louis-Oscar Roty and Jules-Clément Chaplain, but for his official work there was little innovation. His medallic work between 1894 and 1903 comprised at least thirty medals and three plaques, and the medals included:

- Sir George Buchanan (Royal Society Medal), 1894;
- Professor Stokes, 1899;
- Samuel Carnegie, 1901;
- Coronation medal of Edward VII, 1902;
- Royal Society of British Architects, 1902;
- National Lifeboat Institution, 1903. B

Besides these he engraved and designed a number of official medals such as:

- the South Africa medal, 1899–1902;
- the Ashanti medal, 1900;
- the Transport Service medal, 1902.

A fuller list was given by J. H. Pinches in the Numismatic Chronicle,' 1903, and by Hocking, Catalogue of Coins in Royal Mint. He executed the dies for the new issue of coins of Queen Victoria in 1893, designed by Thomas Brock. He designed the Britannia reverse of the English bronze coins of 1895, and the issue of British coins made in 1902 after the accession of King Edward VII. His signature on the coins is "De S."

De Saulles also designed and engraved the dies for colonial coins, such as the British Trade Dollar, the British East Africa copper coins, 1897; the British Honduras coins, 1894; the British trade dollar for India, 1895, and the Straits Settlements dollar, 1903. He made the last Great Seal for Queen Victoria (1899), and many designs for official seals for the colonies. At the time of his death he was preparing the models for the great seals of the United Kingdom and those of Ireland and Scotland, subsequently executed by Frank Bowcher. He was an exhibitor at the Royal Academy, 1898–1903.

Preceded by Sir Thomas Brock	Coins of the pound sterling Obverse sculptor 1901	Succeeded by Sir Bertram Mackennal
