= Newfoundland ten cents =

Coin

Type set of the Newfoundland 10-cent coin

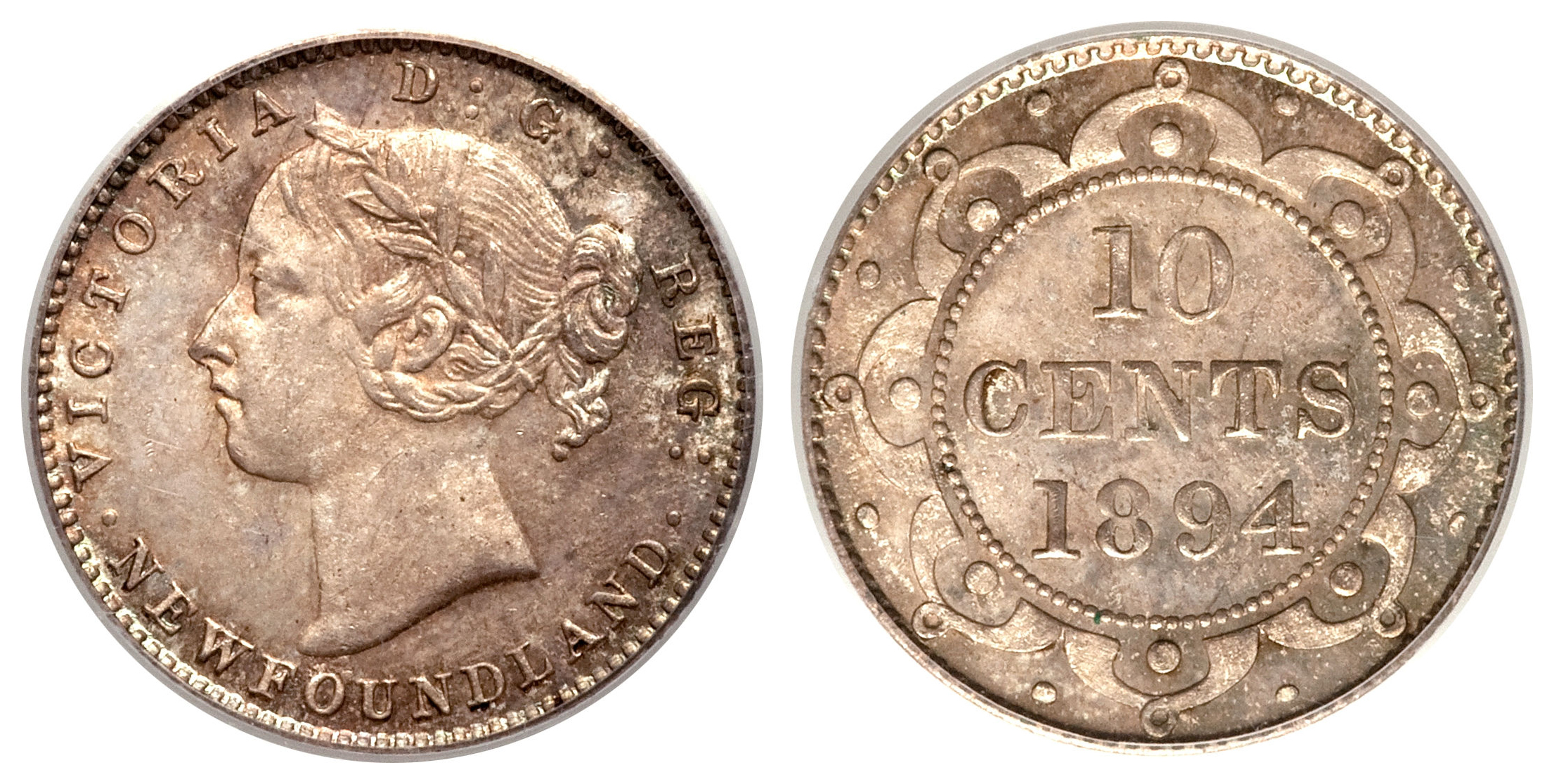
Victoria 10 Cents (1894)

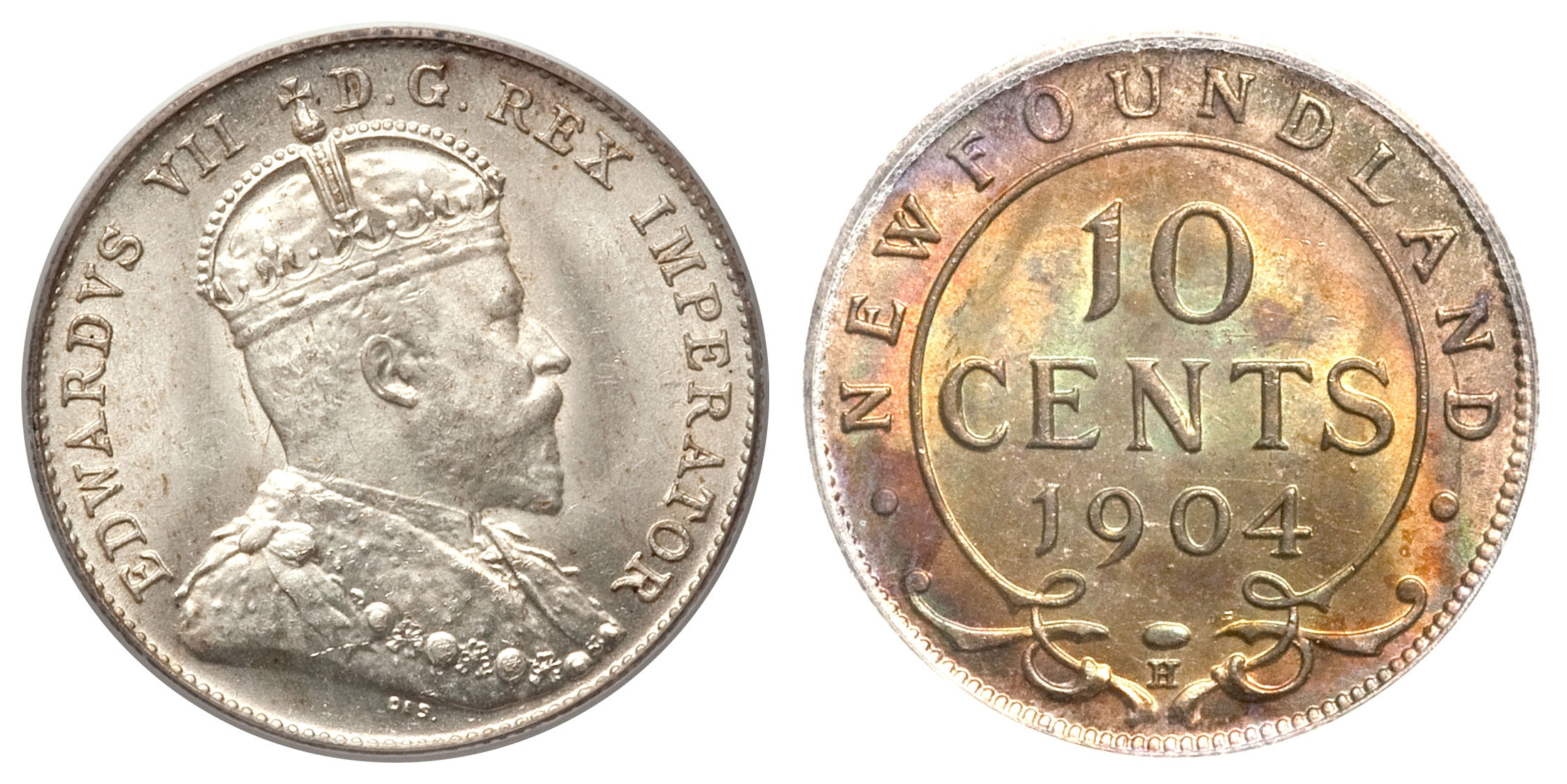
Edward VII 10 Cents (1904)

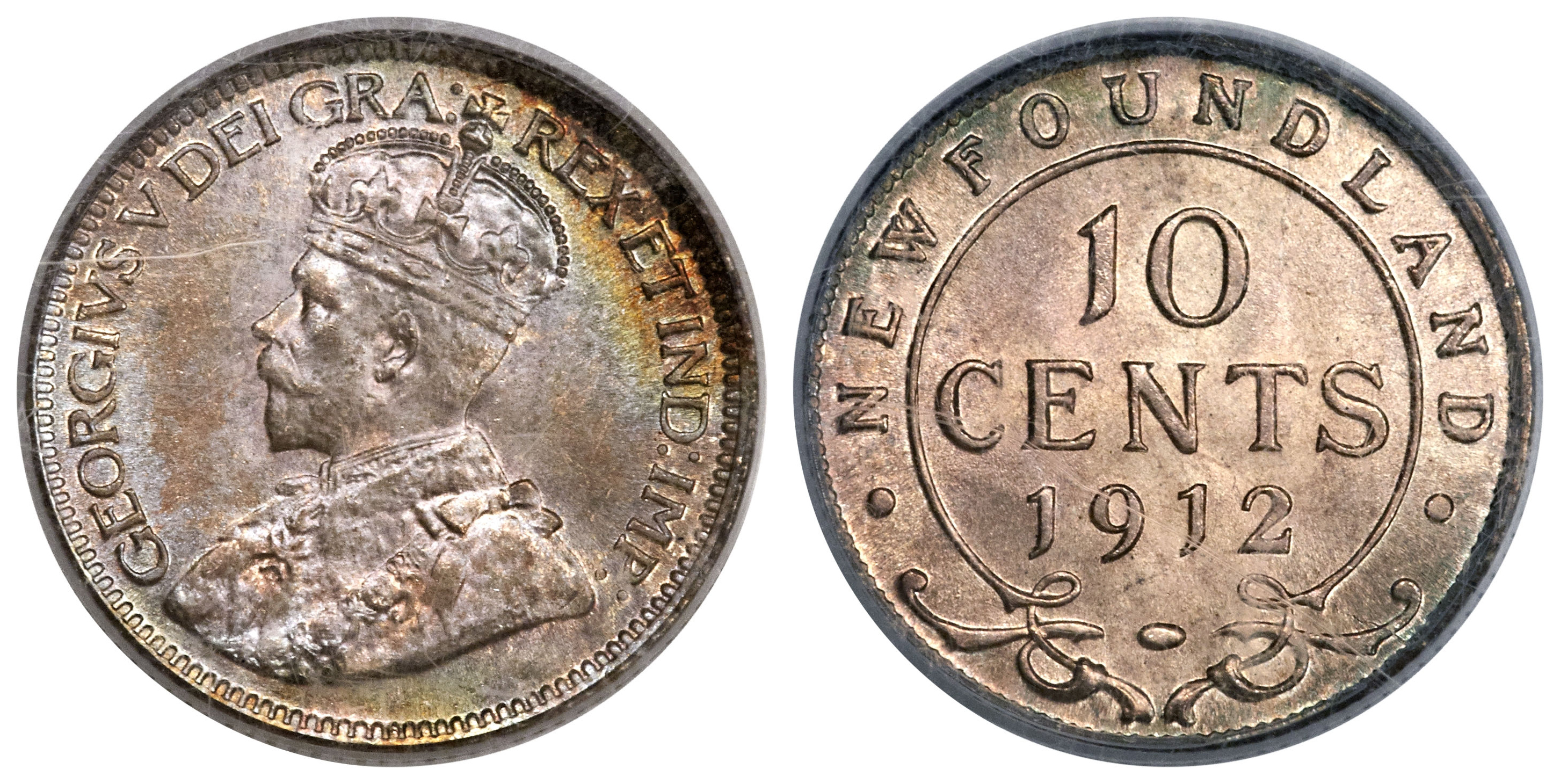
George V 10 Cents (1912)

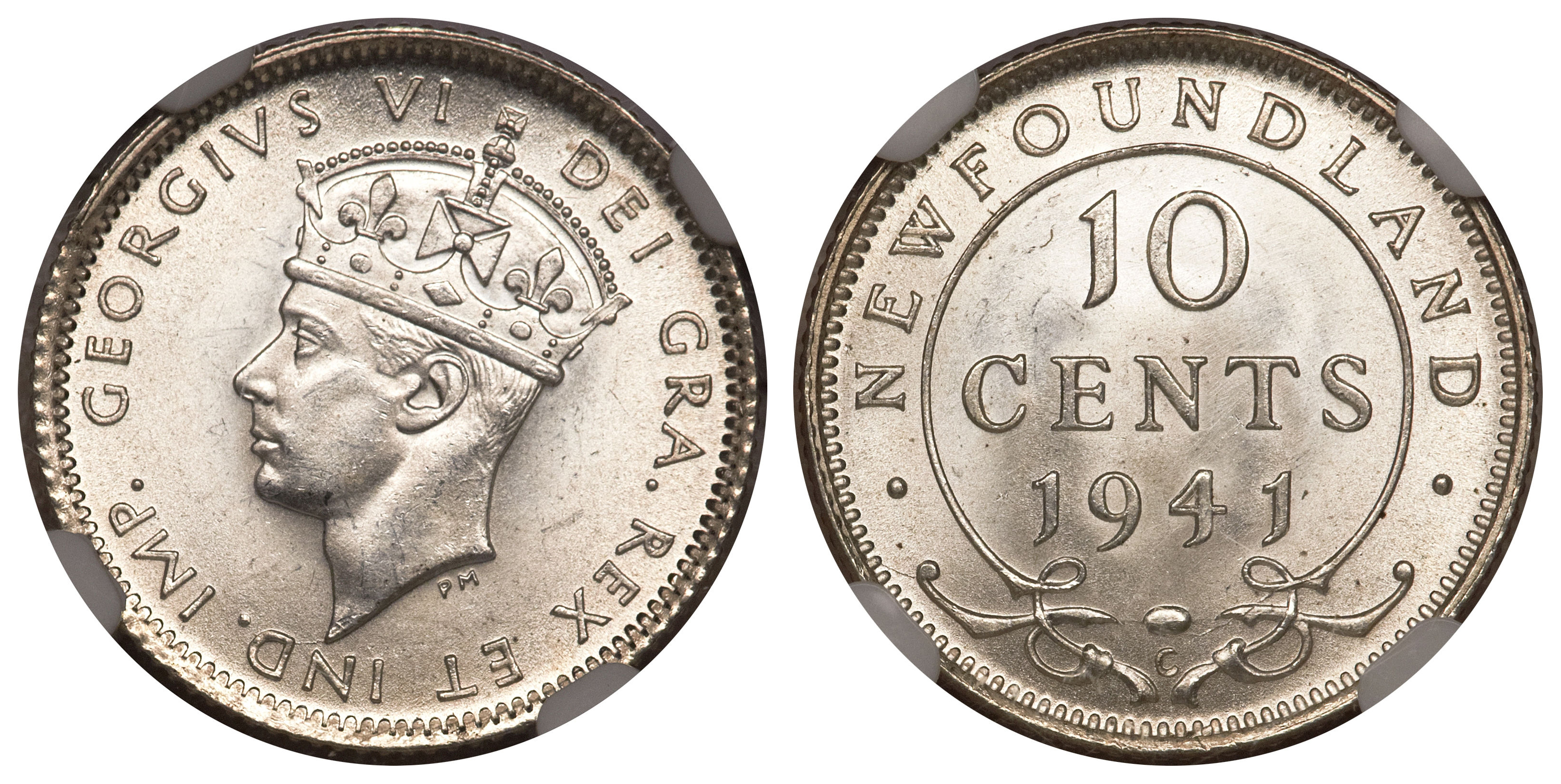
George VI 10 Cents (1941)

The Newfoundland ten cent coins exist as a bronze pattern with the adopted obverse from the New Brunswick coin (the words Newfoundland substitute New Brunswick). This design adoption is similar to that used for Newfoundland five cent coins.

The obverse, featuring Queen Victoria, has three different varieties. The first variety is found on coins dated 1865, 1870, and 1873. There are two leaves at the top of the laurel crown. Another key way to distinguish this is the use of two dots before and after Newfoundland on the obverse.

The second variety features three leaves at the top of the laurel crown and a dot can be found before but not after Newfoundland on the obverse. This variety is featured on coins dated 1870, 1872H, 1873, 1876H, 1880, 1885 and 1894.

The final variety is similar to the first variety with the two leaves at the top of the laurel crown. The difference is that the leaf barely touches the legend band of the obverse and is found on coins dated 1882H, 1885, 1888, 1890, 1894 and 1896.

== 1871 Mint Mule ==
A rare variety exists because an 1871H Dominion of Canada reverse die was muled with an H Newfoundland obverse die.

=== Mintages ===
| Date and Mint Mark | Mintage |
|---|---|
| 1871H | 40,000 |

== Queen Victoria Laureated Portrait, 1865-1896 ==
=== Specifications ===
| Designer | Engraver | Composition | Weight | Diameter |
|---|---|---|---|---|
| Leonard C. Wyon | Leonard C. Wyon | .925 silver, .075 copper | 2.36 grams | 17.98 mm |

=== Mintages ===
| Date and Mint Mark | Mintage |
|---|---|
| 1865 | 80,000 |
| 1870 | 30,000 |
| 1872 | 40,000 (part of 1871 mintage) |
| 1873 | 23,614 |
| 1876H | 10,000 |
| 1880 | 10,000 |
| 1882H | 20,000 |
| 1885 | 8,000 |
| 1888 | 30,000 |
| 1890 | 100,000 |
| 1894 | 100,000 |
| 1896 | 230,000 |

== Edward VII, 1903-1904 ==
The obverse is that used for the Dominion of Canada coins. The reverse is a new design by George W. DeSaulles.

=== Specifications ===
| Designer | Engraver | Composition | Weight | Diameter |
|---|---|---|---|---|
| George W. DeSaulles | George W. DeSaulles | .925 silver, .075 copper | 2.36 grams | 17.96 mm |

=== Mintages ===
| Date and Mint Mark | Mintage |
|---|---|
| 1903 | 100,000 |
| 1904H | 100,000 |

== George V, 1912-1919 ==
The obverse is the same as for the Dominion of Canada issues. The reverse is a continuation of the Newfoundland Edward VII designs.

=== Specifications ===
| Designer | Engraver | Composition | Weight (1912–1917) | Weight (1919) | Diameter (1912) | Diameter (1917–1919) |
|---|---|---|---|---|---|---|
| Sir E.B. MacKennal | George W. DeSaulles | .925 silver, .075 copper | 2.36 grams | 2.33 grams | 17.96 mm | 18.03 mm |

=== Mintages ===
| Date and Mint Mark | Mintage |
|---|---|
| 1912 | 150,000 |
| 1917C | 250,805 |
| 1919C | 54,342 |

== George VI, 1938-1947 ==
The obverse for this denomination used Percy Metcalfe’s standard portrait of George VI for British colonial coinages and the existing Edward VII/George V reverse. The mintage figures for 1946 and 1947 are considered unofficial. The same issue occurred with the Newfoundland five cents coins of the era. Published official mint reports do not indicate any mintage of the denomination during 1946, although there appears to be 1946 coins created in 1947. Therefore, mintage figures for 1946 and 1947 are unofficial.

=== Specifications ===
| Designer | Engraver | Composition (1938–1944) | Composition (1945–1947) | Weight | Diameter |
|---|---|---|---|---|---|
| Percy Metcalfe | George W. DeSaulles | .925 silver, .075 copper | .800 silver, .200 copper | 2.36 grams | 18.03 mm |

=== Mintages ===
| Date and Mint Mark | Mintage |
|---|---|
| 1938 | 100,000 |
| 1940 | 100,000 |
| 1941C | 483,630 |
| 1942C | 292,736 |
| 1943C | 104,706 |
| 1944C | 151,471 |
| 1945C | 175,833 |
| 1946C | 38,400 |
| 1947C | 61,988 |
