= Newfoundland twenty-five cents =

Coin produced in the 1910s

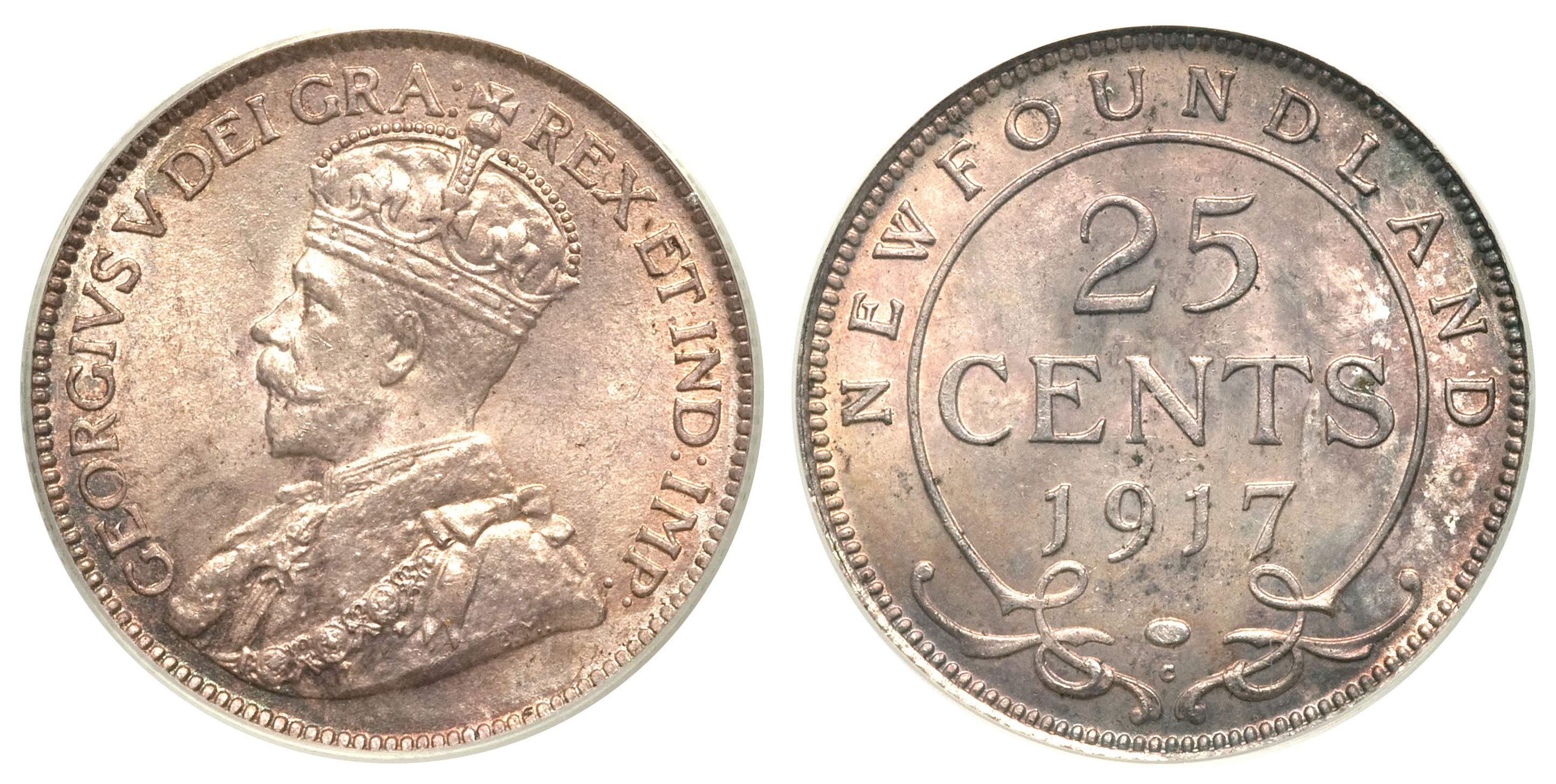
George V 25 Cents 1917C

Although twenty-cent coins were required during the reign of King George V, arrangements were being made to replace the denomination. The Ottawa Mint was going to start producing Newfoundland's coins and Canadians did not like the Newfoundland twenty-cent piece. Newfoundland coins circulated throughout Canada as well and the Newfoundland twenty-cent coin was often confused with Canadian twenty-five-cent coins. The Canadian government convinced Newfoundland's government to discontinue the twenty-cent coin. A twenty-five-cent coin was introduced and struck on the same standard as the corresponding Canadian coin. The obverse of the coin was exactly the same as that of the Canadian twenty-five-cent coin.

== Specifications ==
Designer	Engraver	Composition	Mass	Diameter
Sir E.B. MacKennal	Sir E.B. MacKennal	.925 silver, .075 copper	5.83 grams	23.62 mm

== Mintages ==
Date and Mint Mark	Mintage
1917C	464,779
1919C	163,939
