= Newfoundland twenty cents =

Discontinued Canadian currency

Type set of the Newfoundland 20-cent coin

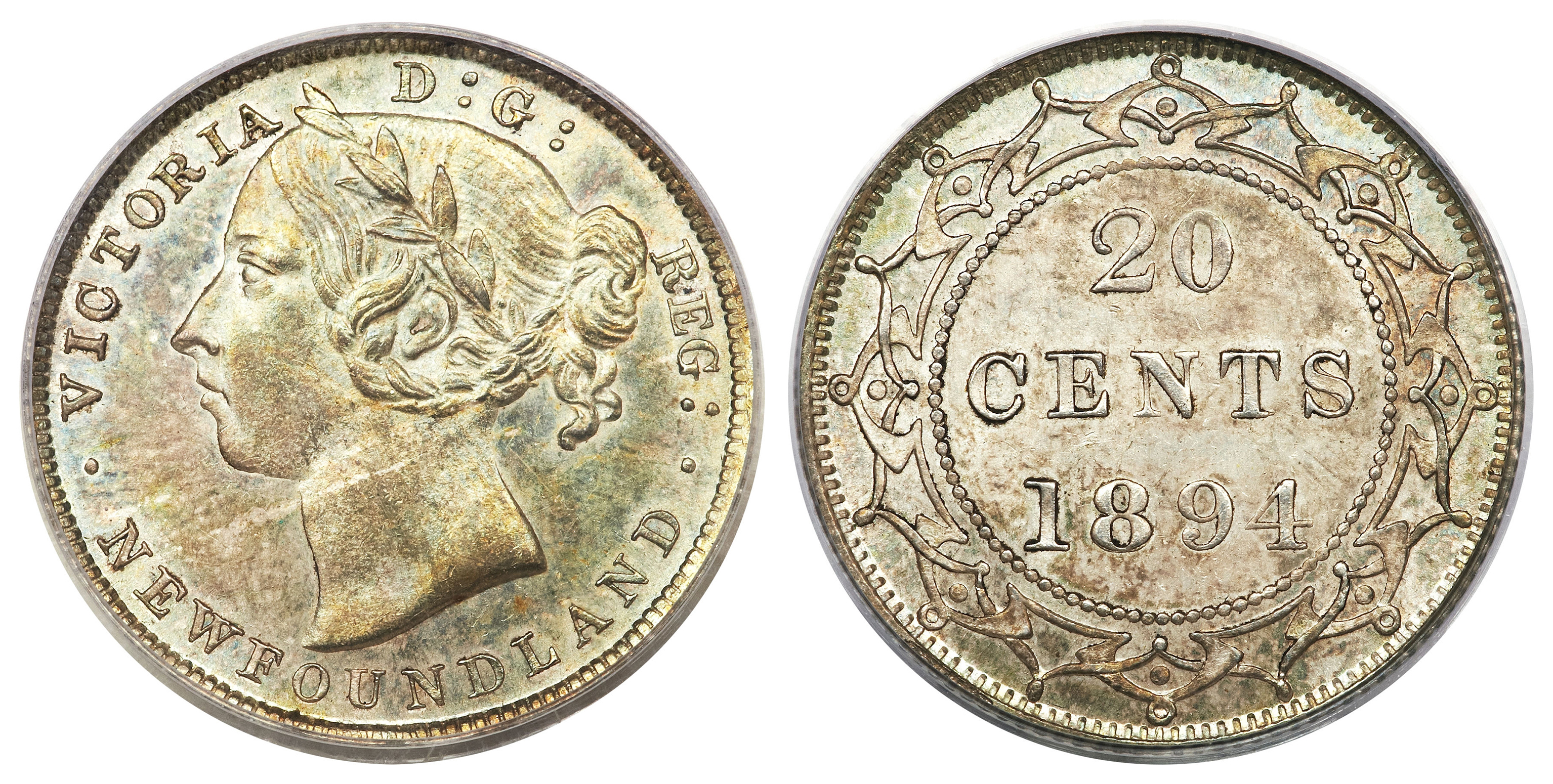
Victoria 20 Cents (1894)

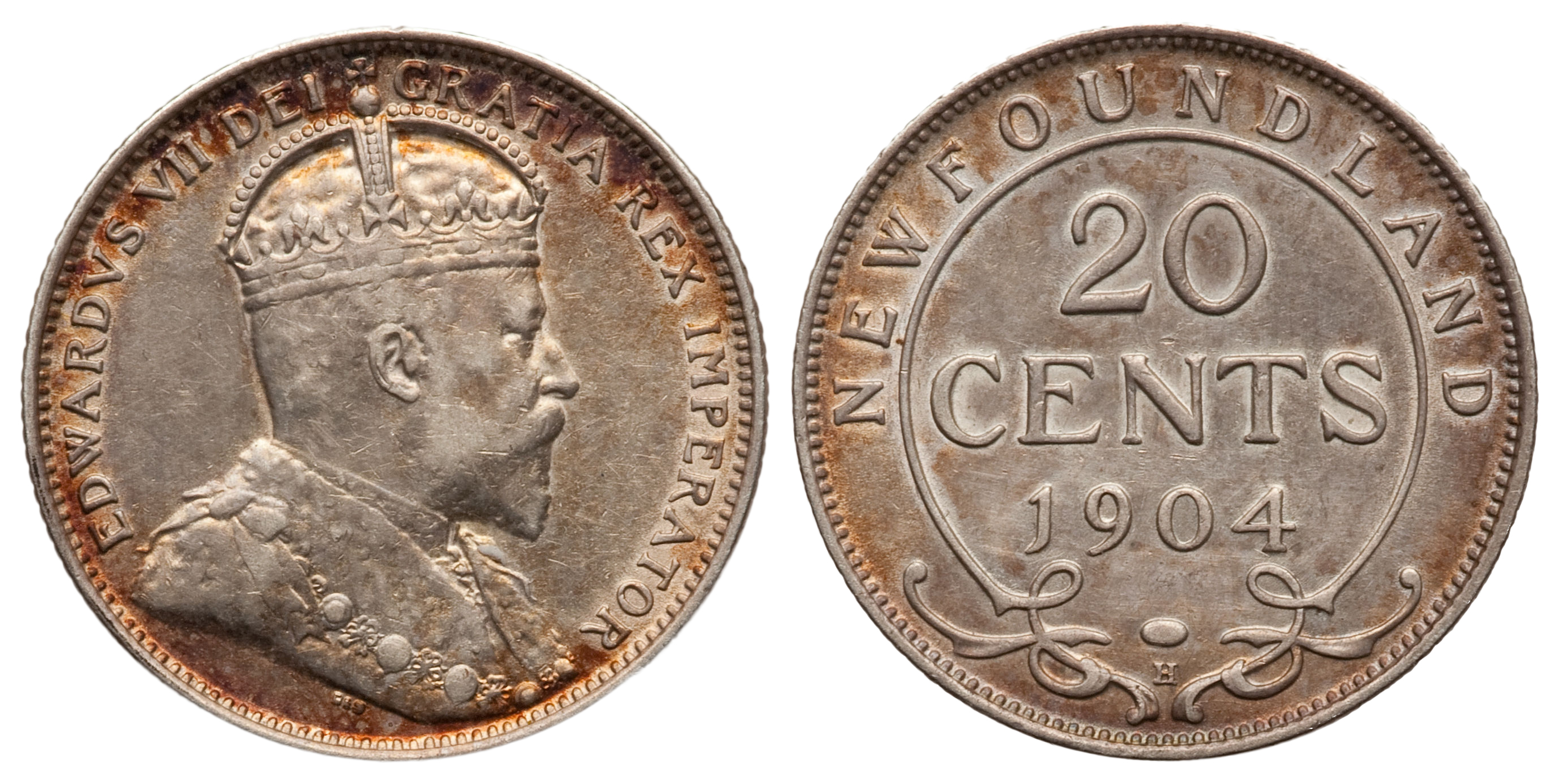
Edward VII 20 Cents (1904)

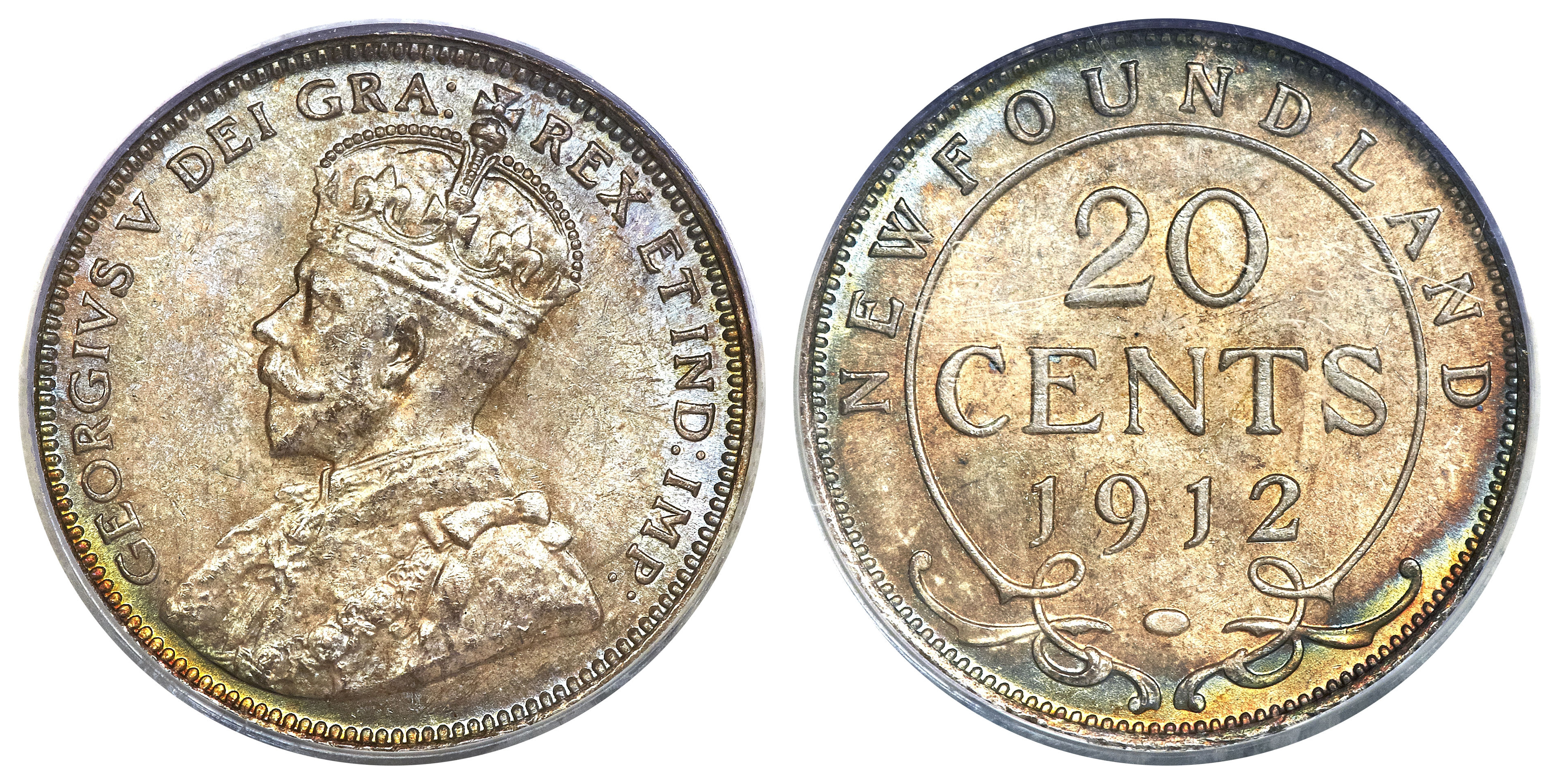
George V 20 Cents (1912)

The first known pattern for the Newfoundland 20-cent piece is a bronze strike with an obverse derived from a New Brunswick coin. The reverse is from the die for the 1864 New Brunswick 20-cents. The twenty-cent denomination was very popular in Newfoundland and was minted on a consistent basis throughout the reign of Queen Victoria. Over the years the piece became unpopular with Canadians as it was easily confused with the Canadian 25-cent piece, which was similar in size and shape. Pressured by Canada, the government replaced it with a twenty-five cent coin during World War I.

== Queen Victoria Laureated Portrait, 1865-1894 ==
=== Specifications ===
Designer (Obverse)	Designer (Reverse)	Engraver	Composition	Weight	Diameter
Leonard C. Wyon	Horace Morehen	Leonard C. Wyon	.925 silver, .075 copper	4.71 grams	23.19 mm

=== Mintages ===
Date and Mint Mark	Mintage
1865	100,000
1870	50,000
1872H	90,000
1873	45,797
1876H	50,000
1880	30,000
1881	60,000
1882H	100,000
1885	40,000
1888	75,000
1890	100,000
1894	100,000

=== Mintages ===
Date and Mint Mark	Mintage
1896	125,000
1899	125,000
1900	125,000

1896 has Large 96 and Small 96 Varieties. 1899 has three varieties, large 99, small 99 and Hook 99's where the bottom of the 9's appear to have ends like those of fishing hooks.

== Edward VII 1904 ==
Twenty-cent coins were required only on one occasion during Edward's short reign, making the 1904 issue the only one during his reign.

=== Specifications ===
Designer	Engraver	Composition	Weight	Diameter
George W. DeSaulles	W.H.J. Blakemore (copied DeSaulles’ design for 5 and 10 cent coins)	.925 silver, .075 copper	4.71 grams	23.19 mm

=== Mintages ===
Date and Mint Mark	Mintage
1904H	75,000

== George V 1912 ==
Just like the Edwardian predecessor, the George V issue was only for one year.

=== Specifications ===
Designer	Engraver	Composition	Weight	Diameter
Sir E.B. MacKennal	Sir E.B. MacKennal	.925 silver, .075 copper	4.71 grams	23.19 mm

=== Mintages ===
Date and Mint Mark	Mintage
1912	350,000
