= Leonard Charles Wyon =

English engraver (1826–1891)

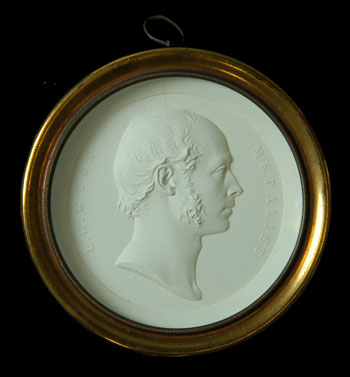
Leonard Charles Wyon (self-portrait in plaster)

Leonard Charles Wyon (23 November 1826 – 20 August 1891) was a British engraver of the Victorian era most notable for his work on the gold and silver coinage struck for the Golden Jubilee of Queen Victoria in 1887 and the bronze coinage of 1860 with the second ("bun") head portrait, in use from 1860 to 1895.

== Career ==
The eldest son of chief engraver William Wyon and his wife, Catherine Sophia, née Keele (died 1851), Leonard Charles Wyon was born in one of the houses in the Royal Mint in 1826, and was educated at Merchant Taylors' School. L. C. Wyon's father taught him art and also from his father he inherited great skill in die engraving. By the age of 16 he had already made several medals and some of his early work is displayed in the British Museum's Numismatic collection. He first exhibited at the Royal Academy in 1843. From 1844 he studied at the Royal Academy Schools and in the same year, at the age of just 18, he became Second Engraver under his father at the Royal Mint. One of his earliest medals to be widely praised was his 1846 medal of the Irish Temperance preacher Theobald Mathew. In 1850 he was commissioned by Queen Victoria to make medallic portraits of the royal children, and in 1851 he executed the reverse of the prize-medal for The Great Exhibition. Also in 1851, at the age of 24, he succeeded his father, who had died, with the title of Modeller and Engraver. In 1854 he engraved the 'William Wyon Laudatory Medal', in memory of his father, for the Art Union of London. Like his father before him, he also produced dies for postage and other stamps.

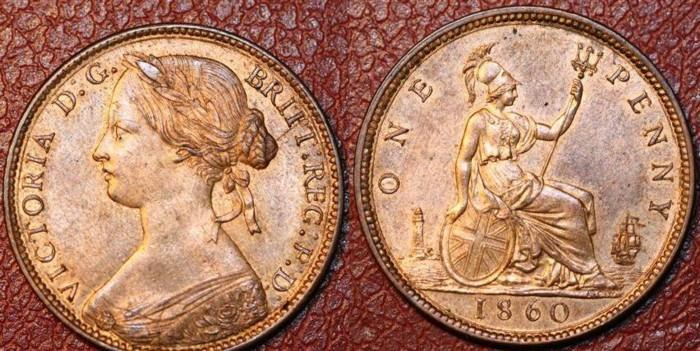
Wyon's 'Bun Head' penny of 1860 showing his initials L.C.W. beneath Britannia's foot

In 1860 L. C. Wyon was invited to prepare designs for the new British bronze coin denominations. It was pointed out to Wyon that on no account was Britannia to be omitted from the reverse of the new coinage. The Queen herself took a personal interest in the design for the new minor coinage and gave several sittings to him for her portrait. Wyon submitted a number of designs to the Queen for her approval, one of which she adopted. This design included a bronze penny, commonly known as the 'bun' penny on account of Victoria's hair style.

Intending to give a bold relief to the designs on the new bronze coins, Wyon engraved the original dies so deeply that they were liable to fracture after relatively few pieces had been struck from them. He therefore had to start again and, after he had produced dies of less bold relief, mass-production of the bronze coinage began.

Wyon also engraved the dies for the gold and silver Jubilee coinage struck for the Golden Jubilee of Queen Victoria in 1887. This coinage, the designs for which were prepared from life by Sir Joseph Boehm, RA, produced a storm of disapproval, directed particularly against Boehm's portrait of the Queen.

Wyon, like his father William before him, prepared many dies for coinage use in various parts of the British Empire, including those for Australia, British East Africa, British Guiana, the West Indies, British Honduras, British India; the British India Native States of Alwar, Bikanir, Dwas and Dgar; Canada, Ceylon, Cyprus, Hong Kong, Jamaica, Jersey, Malta, Mauritius, New Brunswick, Newfoundland, Nova Scotia, Prince Edward Island and the Straits Settlements. His official medals included the South Africa Medal (1853), the Arctic and Baltic Medals, the Indian Mutiny Medal and the South Africa Medal (1879). Among his portrait medals are those of William Wordsworth (1848), Robert Stephenson (1850), Joseph Paxton (1854), Richard Sainthill (1855), Henry Hallam (1859) and William Ewart Gladstone (1879).

On 22 June 1852 Wyon married Mary Birks (1831–1902) and the couple lived in London, first in Maida Vale and from 1856 in St John's Wood. None of their numerous offspring took up their father's profession.

At the age of 64, Wyon died of Bright's disease and apoplexy at his home, 54 Hamilton Terrace, St John's Wood, London, on 20 August 1891 and was buried at Paddington Old Cemetery.

Preceded by William Wyon	Coins of the pound sterling Obverse sculptor 1860	Succeeded by Joseph Edgar Boehm
