= Homer (surname) =

Homer or Homér is a surname, and may refer to:

- Alexander Homér (born 1970), Slovak football player
- Alfred Homer (1870–1937), English football manager
- Anne Homer (1907–1995), American writer
- Annie Homer (1882–1953), English biochemist
- Ben Homer (1917–1975), American songwriter, composer and arranger
- Caroline Homer, Australian midwifery researcher and women's health rights advocate
- Cyril F. Homer (1919–1975), United States Army Air Force fighter ace
- Daryl Homer (born 1990), American saber fencer
- Derek Homer (born 1977), American football player
- Hazel Homer-Wambeam, American beauty pageant winner
- Henrietta Maria Benson Homer (1809–1884), American botanical artist
- Henry Homer the elder (1719–1791), English clergyman and writer
- Henry Homer, the younger (1753–1791), English classical scholar
- Herbert Homer (1895–1977), English cricketer and cricket administrator
- Horatio J. Homer (1848–1923), Boston's first African-American police officer
- Hugh Homer (born 1935), Trinidad and Tobago sports shooter
- Irv Homer (1924–2009), American radio talk show host and television personality
- Ján Homer (born 1980), Slovak ice hockey player
- Jim Homer (1921–1992), American basketball player and coach
- John Homer (1781–1836), merchant and political figure in Nova Scotia
- Joshua Homer (1827–1886), Canadian Member of Parliament
- LeRoy Homer Jr. (1965–2001), first officer of one of the 9/11 aircraft
- Lin Homer (born 1957), British civil servant
- Louise Homer (1871–1947), American operatic contralto
- Majorie Homer-Dixon (born 1945), Canadian sprint kayaker
- Mark Homer (born 1973), British actor
- Mark S. Homer (born 1962), American politician
- Mary Homer (born 1958), British businessperson
- Matthew Barnes-Homer (born 1986), English footballer
- Max Homer (1935–2014), American politician from Pennsylvania convicted of extortion
- Mel Homer (born 1969/1970), New Zealand presenter and writer
- Michael Homer (1958–2009), American electronics and computer industry executive
- Peter K. Homer (born 1961), American aerospace engineer
- Pierce Homer (born 1956), Virginia Secretary of Transportation
- Robert H. Homer (1849–1927), American politician from Wyoming
- Sidney Homer (1864–1953), American composer of "A Plantation Ditty"
- Sonny Homer (1936–2006), Canadian football player
- Syd Homer (1903—1983), English footballer
- Tevin Homer (born 1995), American football player
- Thomas J. Homer (born 1947), American politician from Illinois
- Thomas Homer-Dixon (born 1956), Canadian political scientist and author
- Tim Homer (1973/4–2017), New Zealand radio personality
- Tom Homer (born 1990), English rugby union footballer
- Tom Homer (footballer) (born 1886), English footballer
- Travis Homer (born 1998), American football player
- Tristan Homer (born 1980), Canadian television producer and podcaster
- William Innes Homer (1929–2012), American academic, art historian and author
- Will Homer (born 1995), English rugby union footballer
- Winslow Homer (1836–1910), American painter

== See also ==
- Home (surname)
- Homes (surname)
- Hamer (surname)
