= Joseph Moore (medallist) =

British medallist and die-sinker (1817 – 1892 or 1901)

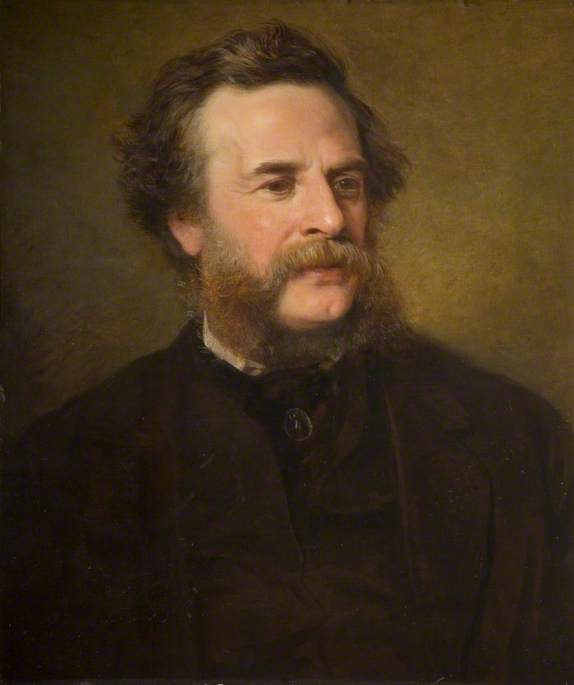
Portrait of Joseph Moore, by William Thomas Roden, c. 1860–1870

Joseph Moore (17 February 1817 – 1901 or 1892) was a British medallist.

== Life and work ==
Born in Birmingham, Joseph Moore was apprenticed at a young age to diesinker Thomas Halliday. He also trained under Samuel Lines, another diesinker and engraver. After completing his apprenticeship he began his own business in Birmingham with dies for button making, at the time one of the chief industries in Birmingham, and won a prize at the 1851 Great Exhibition in London for his work. While engaged in his apprenticeship and working as a buttonmaker, he studied in his own time to gain the skills of a medallist.

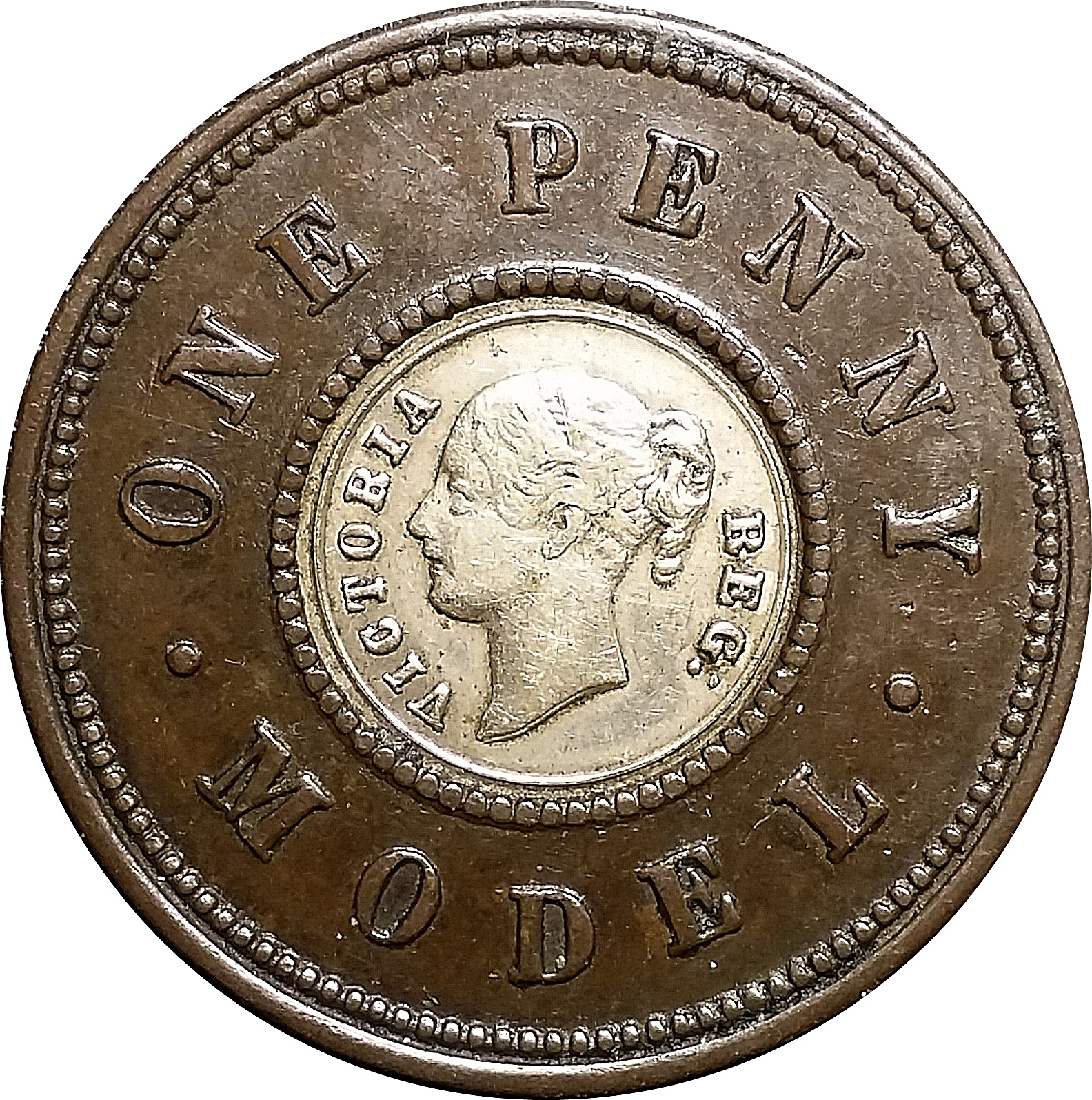
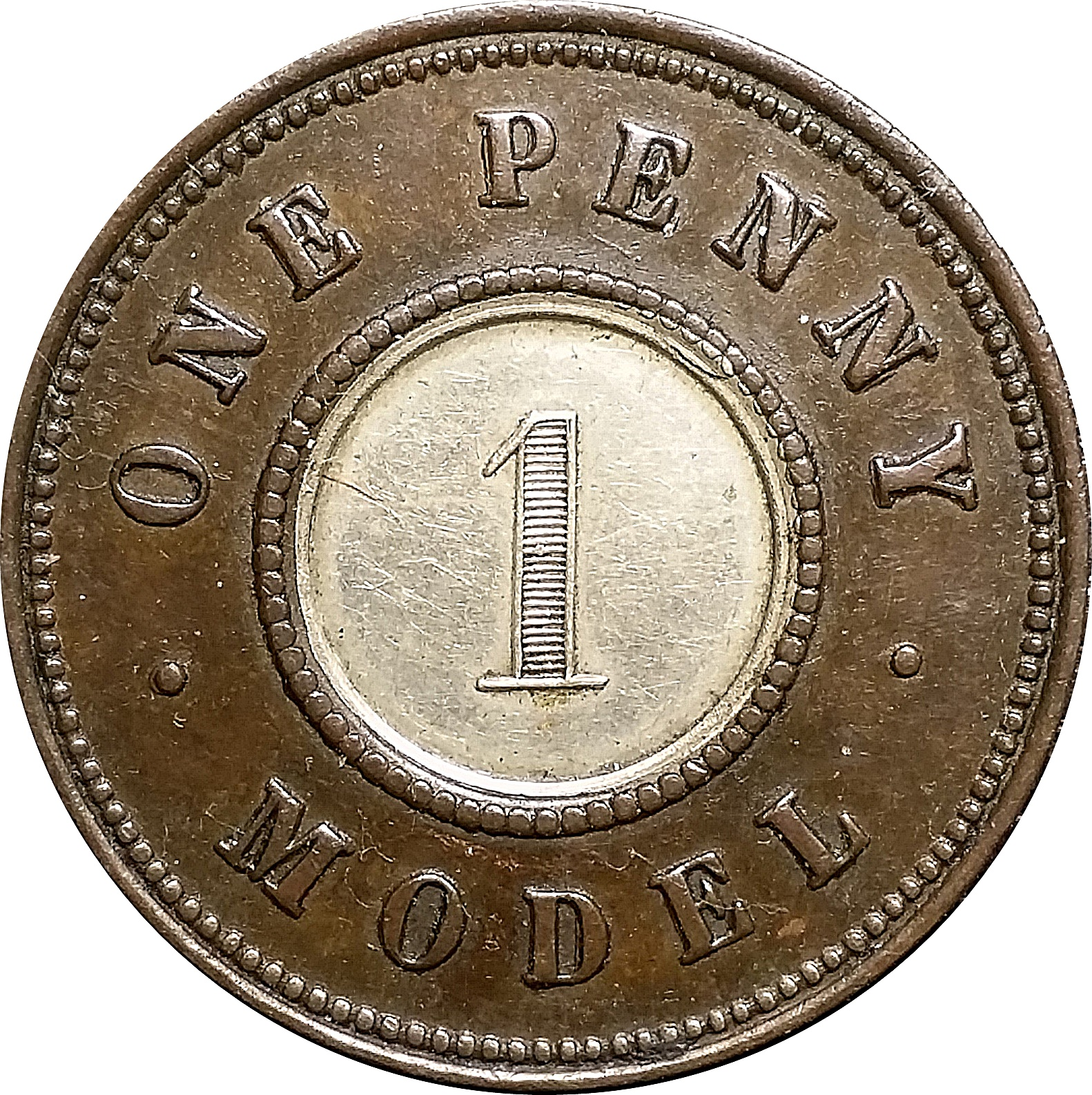
Victoria One Penny Model by Joseph Moore

He was a designer of medals principally, but first came to public attention when he created the 1844 Victoria One Penny Model. This penny was so popular with the public that William Wyon, coin die-sinker at the Royal Mint, felt 'compelled to advertise the fact that [the pennies] were the result of private enterprise and not a government issue'. Later he entered the business of medallist William Joseph Taylor. For some time he was in a partnership, Allen and Moore in Birmingham, thought by some to be the best medallists of the later nineteenth century.

He also created model coins for the denominations 1/32, 1/16, 1/8, 1/4, and 1/2 farthing, mille, 1/2 penny, florin, and crown.

Moore created some of the dies used by Heaton and Sons to produce coins and tokens. He is credited as the designer of the penny and halfpenny tokens issued by Thomas Holloway in 1857 and 1858. It is argued that Holloway's tokens were produced in Heaton and Sons' Birmingham establishment, on the basis of cardboard impressions taken from dies bearing Holloway's head that were donated to The Birmingham Museum and Art Gallery by The Mint, Birmingham.

Some of the best of Moore's work has gone without bearing his name, having been executed on commission. For half a century he engraved medals and furnished designs for exhibitions in India, Canada, America, Australia, for universities, or in commemoration of events. Moore's signature occurs in various forms: J. MOORE SC; J. MOORE F.; JOSEPH MOORE; J. M.; M.; MOORE F.; etc.

While Regan states 1892 as Moore's year of death, according to Forrer he died in Birmingham in 1901.
