= Homes (surname) =

Homes is a surname and may refer to:

- A. M. Homes (born 1961), American writer
- Henry A. Homes (1812–1887), librarian, diplomat, and missionary
- William Homes (1717–1785), American silversmith
- William Homes Jr. (1742–1825), American silversmith, son of the above

== See also ==
- Home (surname)
- Holmes (surname)
- Homer (surname)
