= Richard Southgate =

Richard Southgate may refer to:

- Richard Southgate (politician) (1774–1857), American attorney and politician
- Richard Southgate (priest) (1729–1795), English clergyman and numismatist
