= Bi-metallic coin =

Coin consisting of more than one metal or alloy

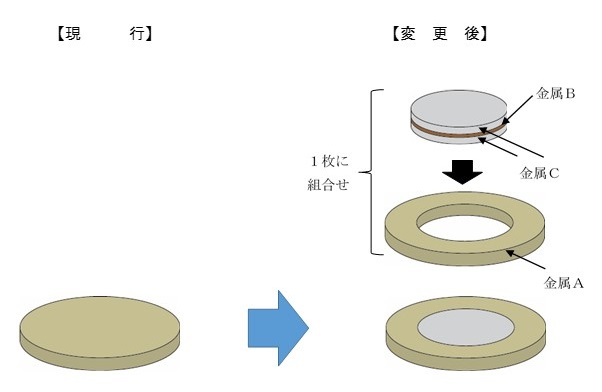
Bi-metallic coins are made up of a core with an outer ring. (e.g.: 500 yen coin)

Bi-metallic coins are coins consisting of two (bi-) metals or alloys, generally arranged with an outer ring around a contrasting center. The bi-metal form is typically used to protect against counterfeiting.

Common circulating examples include the European €1 and €2, United Kingdom £1 and £2, Canadian $2, South African R5, Egyptian £1, Turkish 1 lira and 50 kurus, Indian ₹10 and ₹20, Israeli ₪10, Indonesian Rp1,000, Polish 2 and 5 zł, Czech 50 Kč, Hungarian 100 and 200 Ft, Hong Kong $10, Argentine $1 and $2, Brazilian R$1, Chilean $100 and $500, Colombian $500 and $1000, Peruvian S/2 and S/5, Albanian 100 Lekë, Philippine ₱20, Singaporean S$1, Thai 10 baht, Costa Rican ₡500 and all Mexican coins of $1 or higher denomination. For a more complete list, see List of bi-metallic coins.

== History ==
Bi-metallic coins and medals have been issued for a long time. The Roman Empire issued special-occasion, large medallions with a center of bronze or copper and an outer ring of orichalcum, starting with the reign of Hadrian. Meanwhile, circulating bi-metallic coins are known from the 17th century. English farthings from 1684 through 1693 were made of tin with a central plug of copper for value. The silver-center cent pattern produced by the United States in 1792 is another example.

In the 1830s and 1840s, British medalist Joseph Moore produced large numbers of bi-metallic "penny model" and less common "halfpenny model" tokens, as a proposal to replace the relatively large penny and halfpenny coins. Though not legal tender, Moore's tokens were circulated widely and accepted at face value by many merchants. Despite their popularity, the Royal Mint rejected the proposal, and did not reduce the size of the penny and halfpenny until decimalization.

The first modern circulating bi-metallic coin was the Italian 500 lire, first issued in 1982.

The first ever tri-metallic circulating coins were 20-francs coins introduced in France and Monaco in 1992. These were similar to the corresponding bi-metallic 10-francs coins, but had two rings instead of one.

Bi-metallic coins have been used in commemorative issues, often made of precious metals. For example, the only bi-metallic coin issued by the United States is the 2000 $10 Library of Congress commemorative, made of a gold ring around a platinum center.

== Manufacturing ==
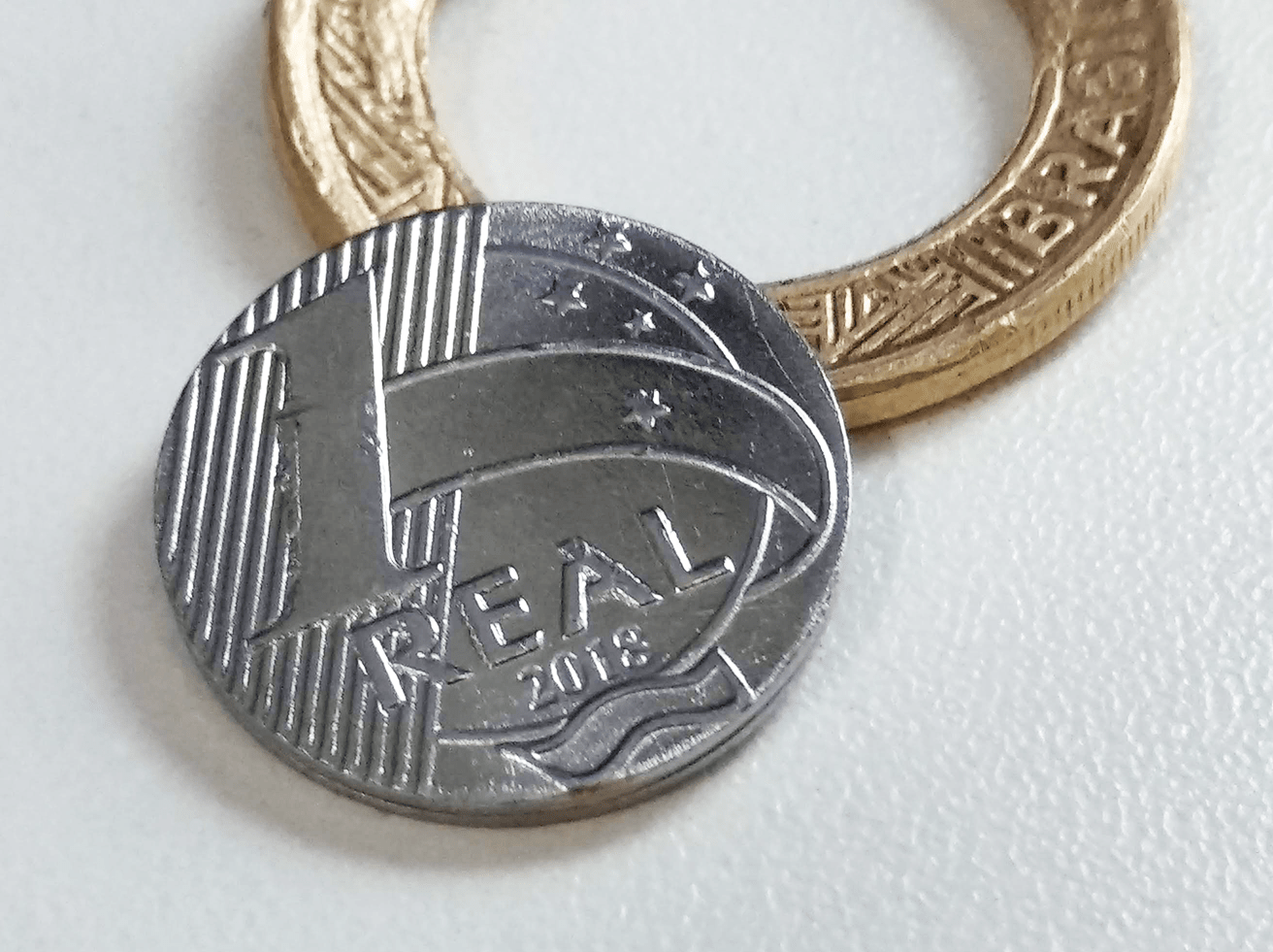
A Brazilian R$1 coin with its parts separated

The manufacturing process is similar to that of ordinary coins, except that two blanks (the inner and the outer) are struck at the same time, deforming the separate blanks sufficiently to hold them together.

== Research ==
A study published in Nature in 2002 found that bimetallic one- and two-euro coins exhibit a Galvani potential of 30 to 40 millivolts when exposed to human sweat, leading to corrosion and nickel release 240 to 320 times greater than that allowed by the EU's Nickel Directive. A study published in the March 2004 issue of the British Journal of Dermatology found that 76% of the 25 study participants, who had a nickel allergy, had a weak to extreme reaction to the nickel-containing bimetallic euro coins. The study authors cited the Nickel Directive as an important policy, and recommended Nordic gold as a better material for minting coins.

== Countries ==
Countries with bimetallic coins in circulation. Gold denotes more than one bimetallic coin in use. Red denotes one bimetallic coin in use.

== Examples ==
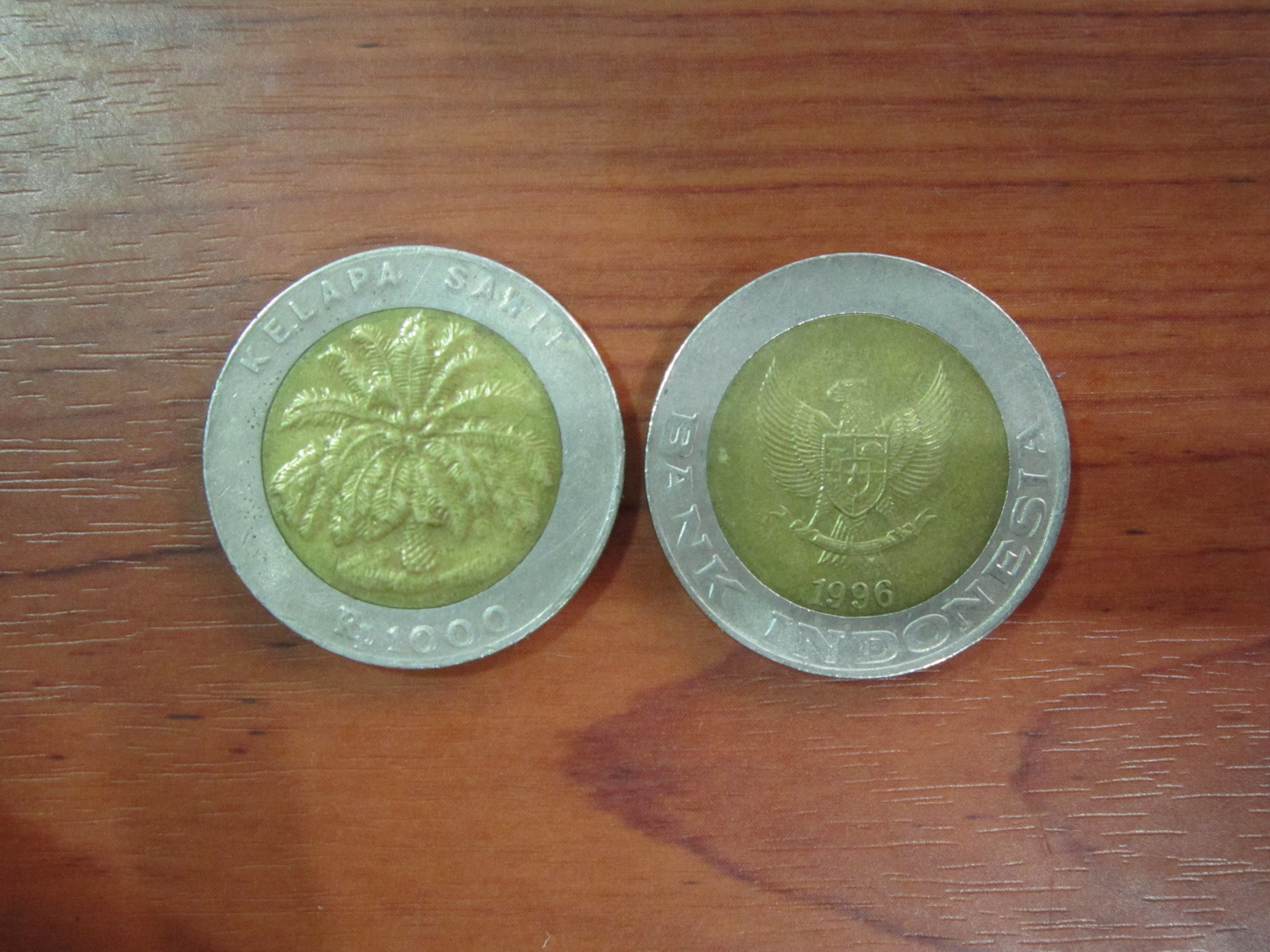
Two "Kelapa Sawit" (oil palm) bi-metallic Rp1,000 coins, with the second one being minted in 1996

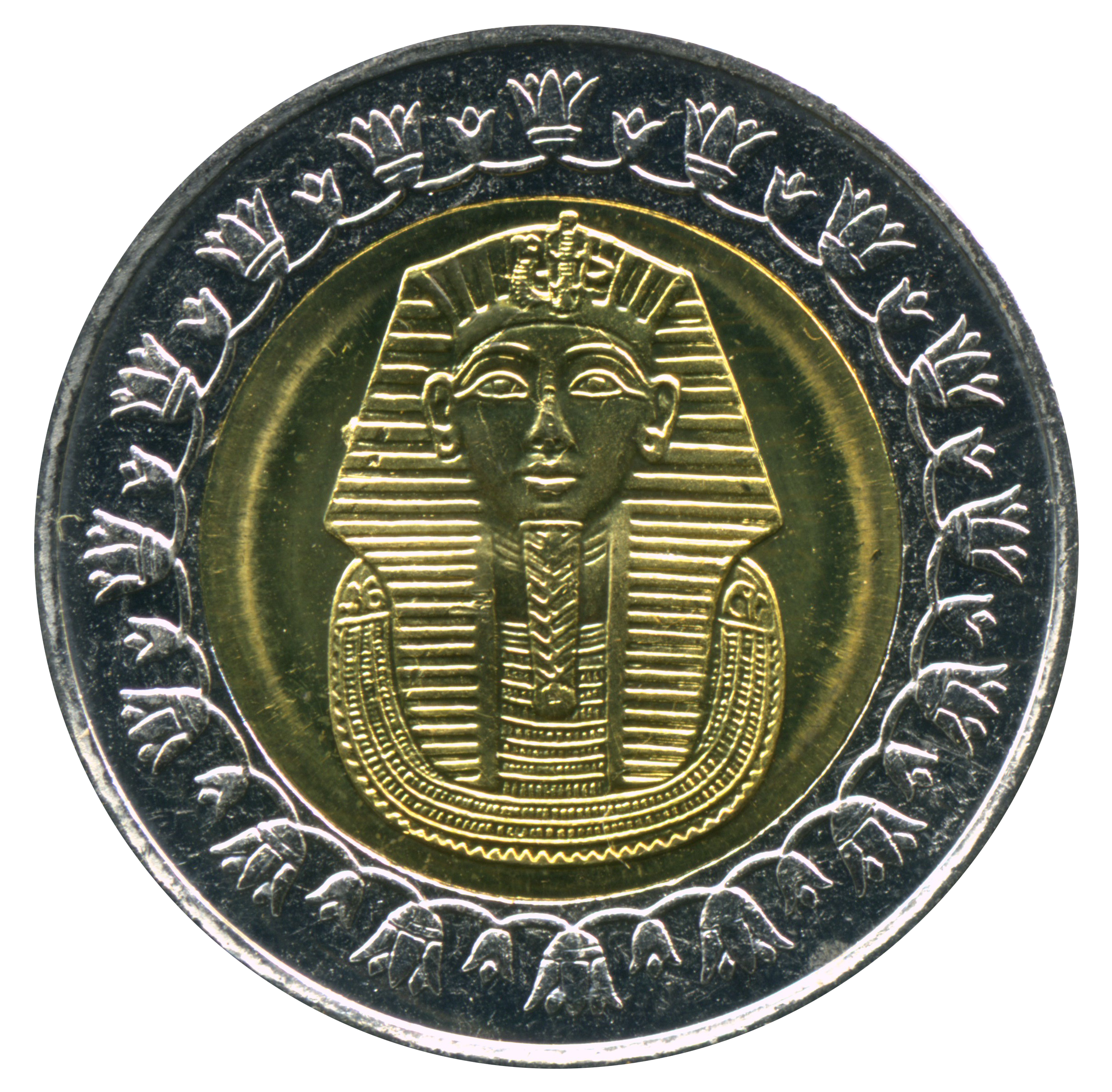
2008 "King Tutankhamun" bi-metallic £E1 coin.

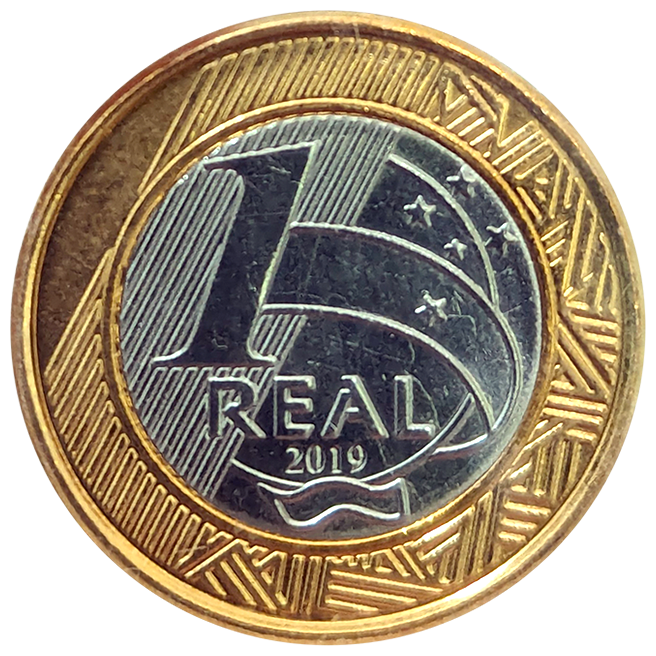
Brazilian R$1 coin, a stainless steel center in a bronze plated steel ring.

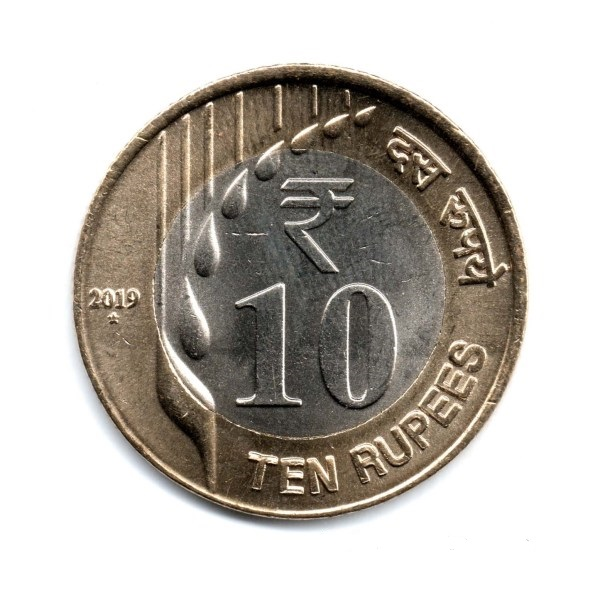
₹10 bi-metallic coins from India.

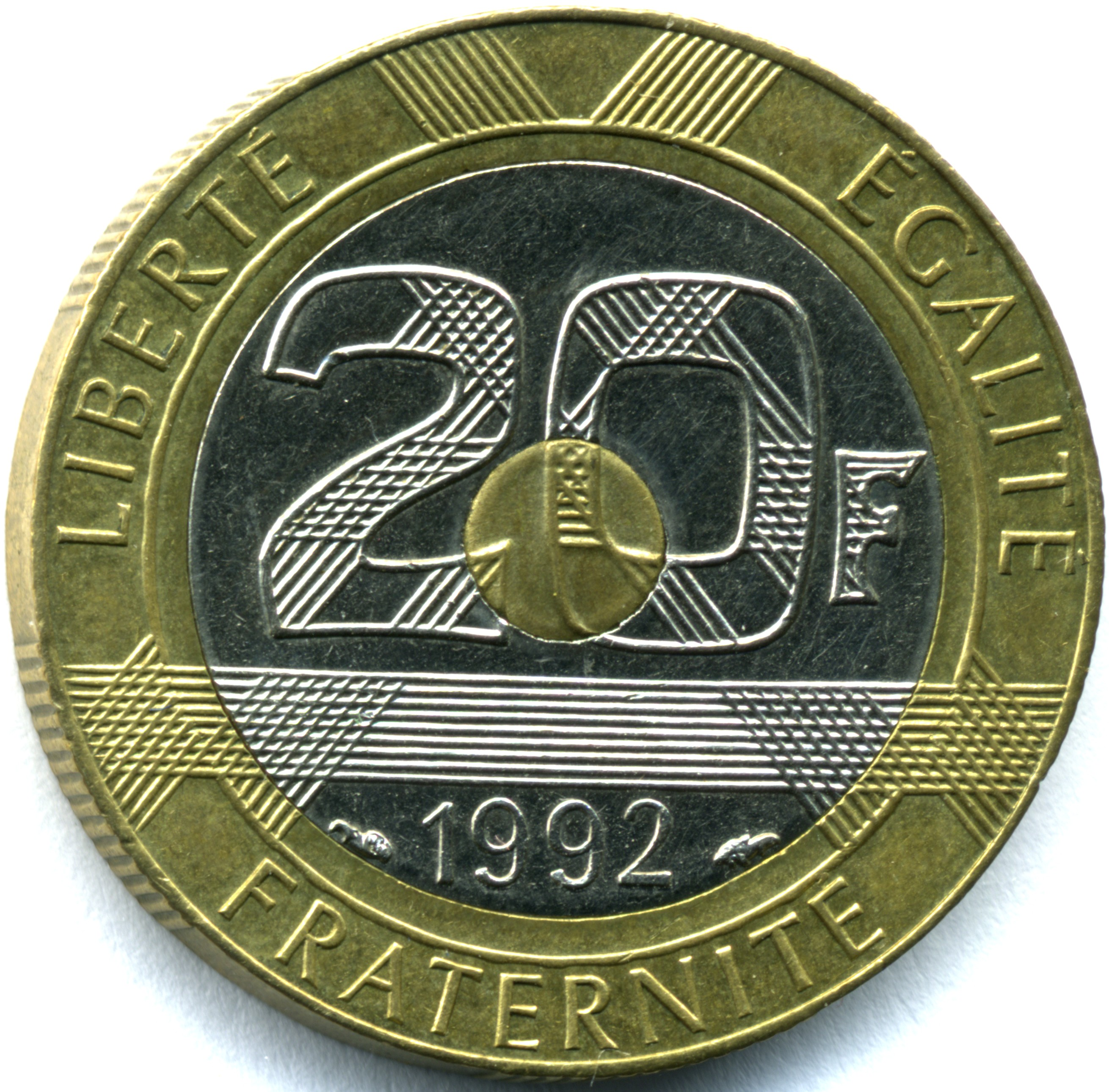
1992 French 20 francs tri-metallic coin.

== See also ==
- List of bi-metallic coins
- List of bi-metallic coins by release date
