= Taylor Combe =

British numismatist and archaeologist

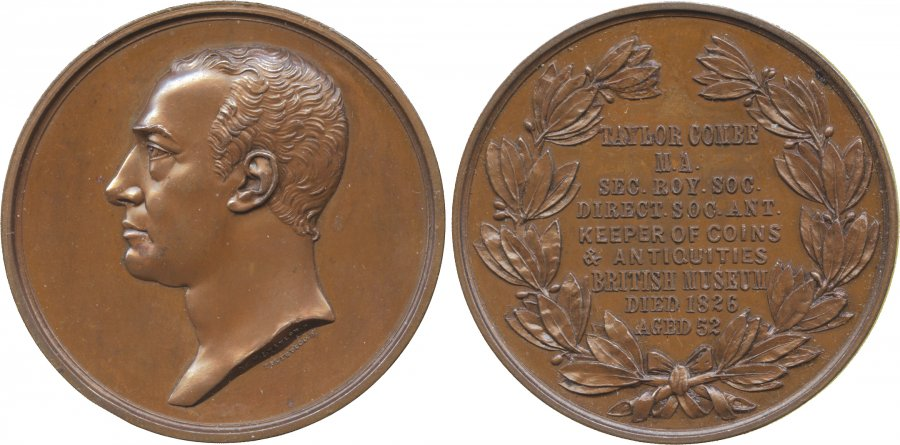
A commemorative medal of Taylor Combe from 1826

Taylor Combe FRS (8 June 1774 – 7 July 1826) was an English numismatist and archæologist.

== Life ==
Combe was the eldest son of Dr. Charles Combe, the physician and numismatist. He was educated at Harrow School and at Oriel College, Oxford, where he graduated B.A. on 5 June 1795, M.A. 10 July 1798.

In 1803, he obtained an appointment in the British Museum, and superintended the collection of coins and medals. In 1807, he became keeper of the department of antiquities, the coins still remaining in his charge. In 1814, he was sent to Zante, to carry out the purchase of the Phigaleian marbles.

Combe was elected a Fellow of the Royal Society in 1806, and was secretary to it from 1812 to 1824, during which period he edited the Philosophical Transactions. He joined the Society of Antiquaries of London in 1796, became its director in 1813, and superintended the publication of the later portions of the Vetusta Monumenta. He contributed many articles to Archæologia.

Combe held his keepership till his death, which took place, after a long illness, at the British Museum on 7 July 1826. He was buried on 14 July, in the family vault in the Bloomsbury burial-ground.

== Legacy ==
Combe's library of classical and numismatic books, together with a collection of prints and some of his manuscripts, was sold by auction at Sotheby's on 7 December 1826 and eleven following days. The sum realised was £1,879 15s. 6d. A medal of Combe, by Benedetto Pistrucci and W. J. Taylor, was struck after his death.

== Works ==
As numismatist and archæologist Combe published these works, issued officially by the Museum trustees:

- Veterum populorum et regum numi qui in Museo Britannico adservantur, London, 1814. This catalogue of the Museum Greek coins was superseded by the Catalogue of Greek Coins in the British Museum, begun in 1873.
- Description of the Anglo-Gallic Coins in the British Museum, London, with engraved plates. The volume was edited and published after his death by Edward Hawkins.
- A Description of the Collection of Ancient Terracottas in the British Museum, London, 1810, with forty engraved plates.
- A Description of the Collection of Ancient Marbles in the British Museum, London, 4to—parts i–iv. (1812–20), and a considerable portion of part v. (1826), which was completed and published after his death by Hawkins. The Description was carried on by Hawkins, Charles Robert Cockerell, and Samuel Birch (parts vi–xi. 1830–61).

== Family ==
Combe married, in 1808, Elizabeth, daughter of Dr. Edward Whitaker Gray.
