= Southampton Street, London =

Street in the City of Westminster, London

Southampton Street
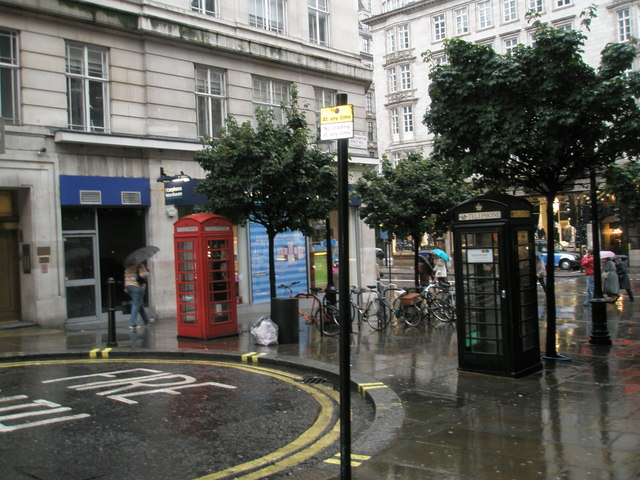
- The southern pedestrianized end of Southampton Street
- Length: 450 ft (140 m)
- Location: Central London
- Postal code: WC2
- Nearest Tube station: Covent Garden
- Coordinates: 51.5110°N 0.1221°W
- south end: A4; Strand
- north end: Henrietta Street

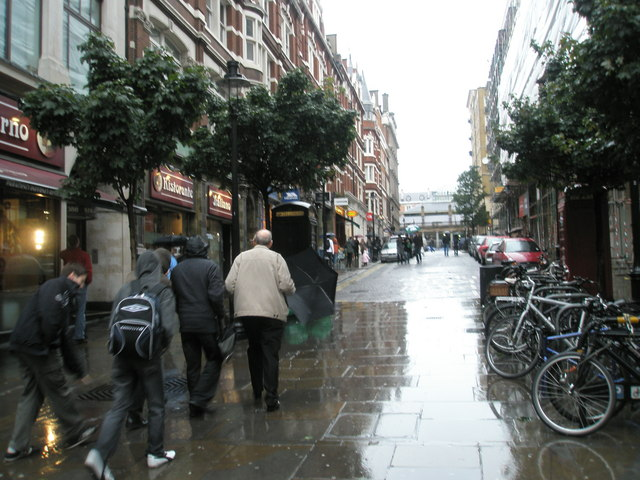
Southampton Street looking north in the rain from the southern Strand end, with Covent Garden Market in the distance.

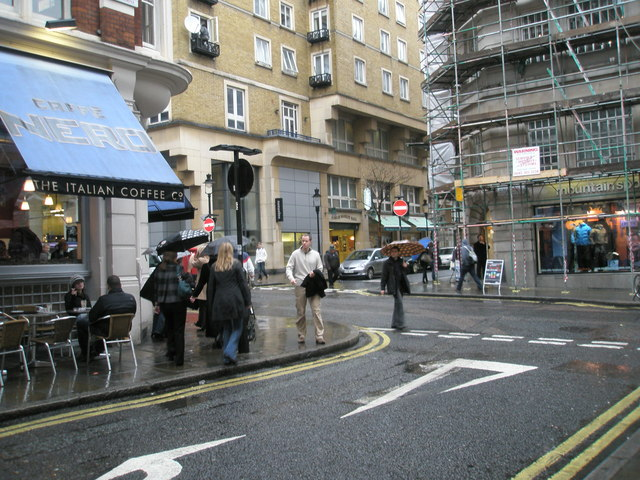
Tavistock Street and Maiden Lane, a staggered crossroads on Southampton Street.

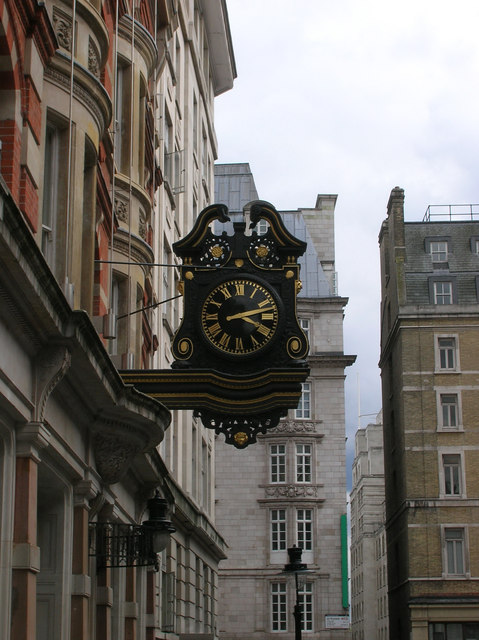
Clock in Southampton Street, outside the British Computer Society offices, looking south towards the Strand.

Southampton Street is a street in central London, running north from the Strand to Covent Garden Market.

There are restaurants in the street such as Bistro 1 and Wagamama. There are also shops such as The North Face outdoor clothing shop.

== History and people ==
The street, like Southampton Row in Bloomsbury to the north, is named after Sir Thomas Wriothesley, 4th Earl of Southampton (1607–1667). It used to be in the district of Bloomsbury, but is now officially in Westminster.

Ambrose Godfrey (1660–1741), a German-born chemist, inventor of the fire extinguisher, and a collaborator of Robert Boyle, lived and had a laboratory and pharmacy in the street from 1706 until his death. A green plaque installed by the City of Westminster marks the site on the west side of the street at No. 31.

John Ashburnham, 1st Baron Ashburnham, a landowner and politician, died at Southampton Street on 21 January 1710, aged 54. Charles Combe, the physician and numismatist, was born on 23 September 1743 in Southampton Street, where his father, John Combe, had a business as an apothecary. Sir William Schwenck Gilbert, the dramatist, librettist, poet, and illustrator, who collaborated with the composer Sir Arthur Sullivan in the Gilbert and Sullivan partnership, was born at 17 Southampton Street on 18 November 1836.

The publisher and editor Sir George Newnes (1851–1910) had offices at 8 Southampton Street. Magazines published from 8–11 Southampton Street included The Grand Magazine, the Happy Magazine, John O'London's Weekly, the Ladies' Home Magazine, and The Strand Magazine.

Goupil & Co., the London branch of the Paris-based art dealership Goupil & Cie, was located at 17 Southampton Street in the 19th century. The painter Vincent van Gogh worked here. He arrived on 19 May 1873 to work for the manager Charles Obach. From August of that year while working here, he lived at 87 Hackford Road in Brixton, south London.

== See also ==
- Southampton Row, Bloomsbury, London
- Southampton Square, the former name of Bloomsbury Square
