= William Homes =

American silversmith

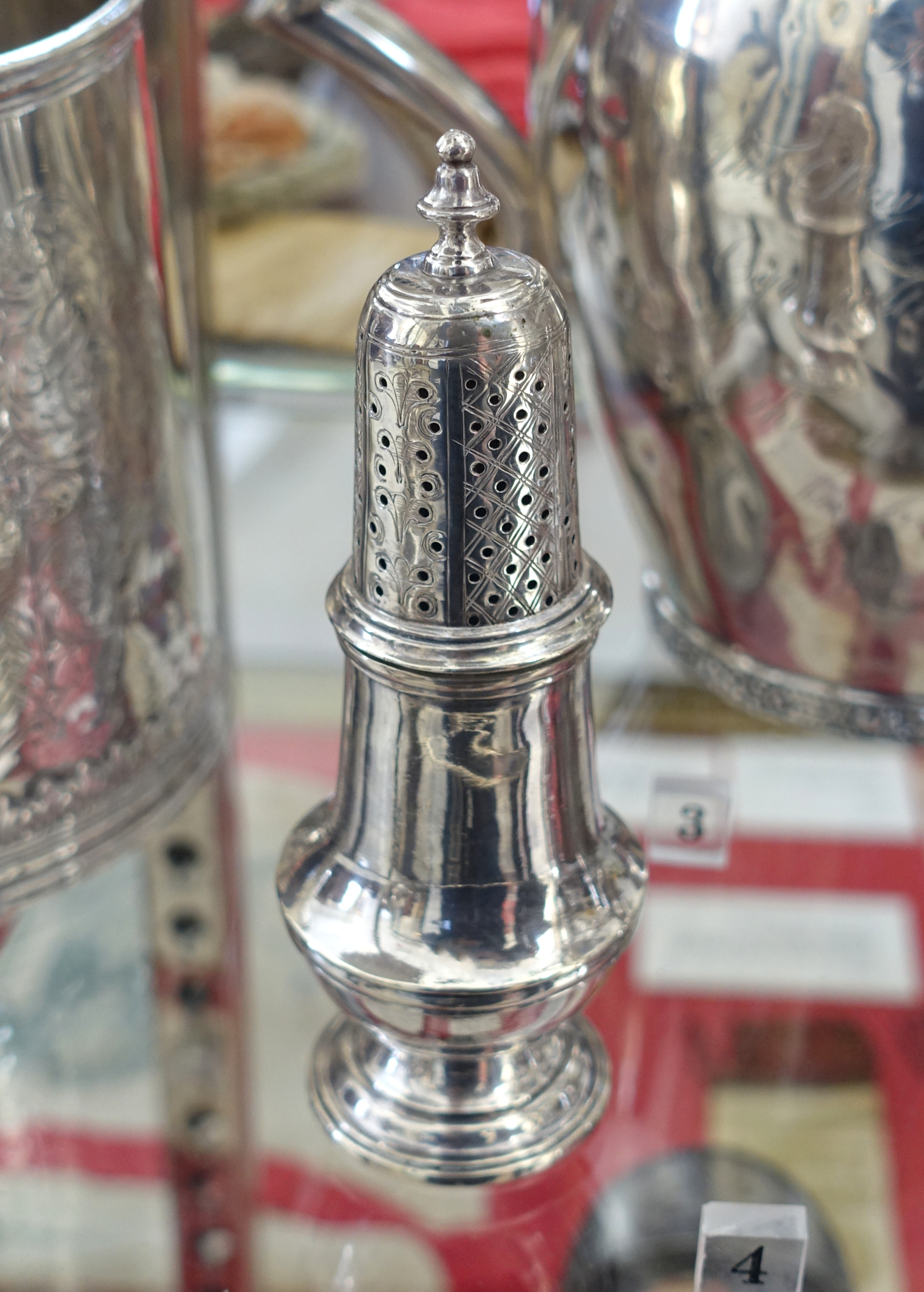
Caster by William Homes, 1752

William Homes (January 10, 1716/17 - July 21, 1785), also spelled William Holmes, was an American silversmith, active in Boston. His son William Homes, Jr. was also a silversmith.

William Homes was the son of Robert Homes and Mary Franklin. He was born in the residence of his grandfather, Josiah Franklin, at the corner of Union and Hanover streets in Boston. His uncle, Benjamin Franklin, youngest son of Josiah Franklin, was then ten years old. He apprenticed circa 1729 with Rufus Greene in his shop on Newberry Street, and then circa 1737–1739 worked from him as a journeyman. Greene's records indicate that he paid Homes 82 pounds 16 shillings 9 pence for work done in the year 1738. In January 1739 "William Homes of Boston Goldsmith" ordered "sundries P. daybook" from silversmith Benjamin Greene, Rufus Greene's brother, for which he paid just over 4 pounds on May 9, 1740. Homes worked as a gold- and silversmith from 1739 to 1763 at his shop in Ann Street and later properties, and was known as the "honest goldsmith." He married Rebecca Dawes (aunt of patriot Thomas Dawes), on April 24, 1740, with whom he had 15 children, many of whom died in infancy. In 1763 he turned over his shop to his son, devoting himself to selling general merchandise and buying and selling real estate.

Homes joined the Artillery Company in 1747, and was promoted over time from First Sergeant in 1752 through Captain in 1765, and an active Son of Liberty. He also served as clerk of the market in 1753, warden in 1764, fireward from 1764 to 1770, and purchaser of grain from 1766 to 1769, surveyor of the highways from 1767 to 1769. He also apparently acted as an attorney at times. In October 1742 "William Homes, Goldsmith," appeared in the Suffolk County Court of Common Pleas to recover a debt of 9 pounds for the mariner John Thomas, and on July 21, 1752, the Boston Gazette reported that "William Homes, goldsmith, was attorney for John Franklin, executor of the estate of Josiah Franklin." The Gazette also mentions "Wiliam Holmes...Goldsmith, near the Draw-Bridge" on May 21, 1759.

Homes left Boston in 1770, moving to one of his properties in Norton, Massachusetts. From 1773 to 1781 he was one of Norton's three selectmen as Captain William Homes, or William Homes, Esq., and was several years moderator of the annual town meetings. In 1775 Homes was the delegate from Norton and Mansfield to the second and third Massachusetts Provincial Congress, and was a member of the Bristol County Committee on correspondence and safety. He paid a fine instead of military service during the draft of 1776, probably because of his age. Homes died of dysentery while on a visit to Boston. He and his wife are buried in the Chapel burying ground on Tremont Street.

His work is collected in the Museum of Fine Arts, Boston and the Bennington Museum.
