= Katharine Greene Amory =

American journalist

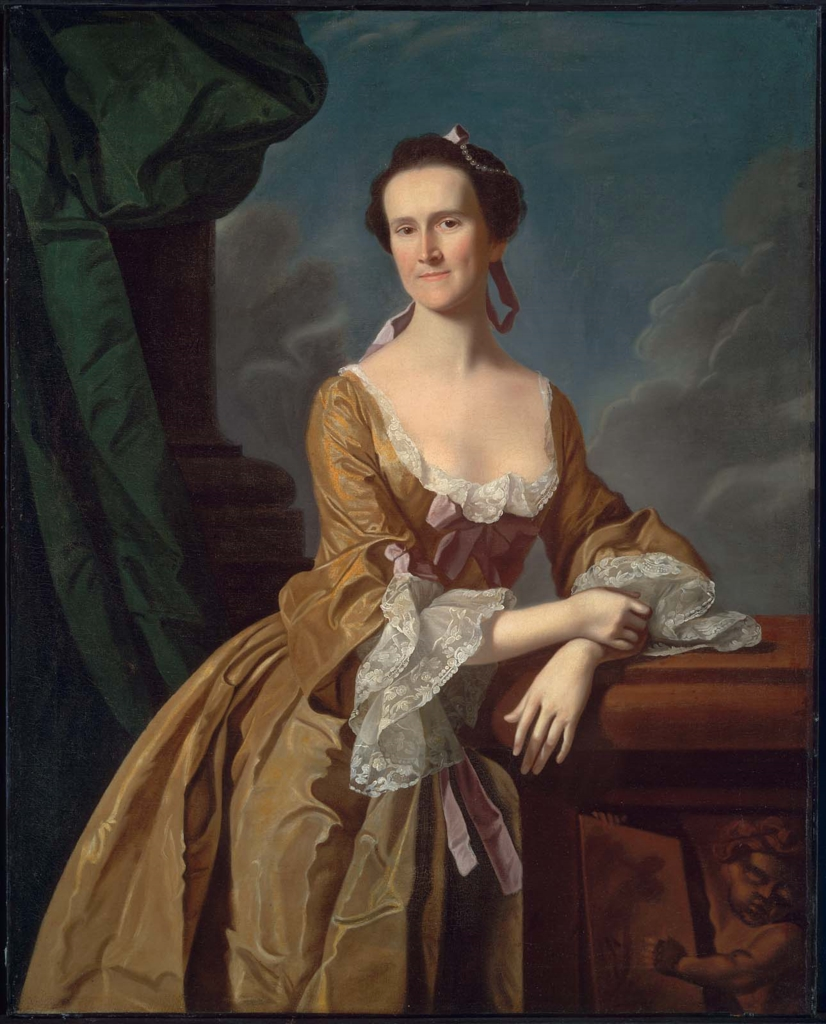
John Singleton Copley, Mrs. John Amory (ca. 1763), oil on canvas.

Katharine Greene Amory (Nov. 22, 1731–April 22, 1777) was an 18th-century Bostonian known for the journal she kept during the American Revolution. It is valued by historians for its record of daily life and for its window onto the viewpoint of a Loyalist woman.

== Early years ==
Katharine Greene was born in Boston in 1731, the oldest daughter of silversmith Rufus Greene and Katherine (Stanbridge) Greene.

== Career ==
In 1756, she married John Amory (1728–1803), a Boston merchant. They had 10 children, 6 sons and 4 daughters. One of their daughters, Rebecca, married lawyer John Lowell, while another married philanthropist John McClean, after whom McLean Hospital is named.

Both Amory and her husband were Loyalists, so with the American Revolution under way in May 1775, they moved to London, leaving their children with members of his family. She died in London in 1777 and John returned to America, though he was prevented from going back to Boston by the Massachusetts Banishment Act of 1778.

Amory kept a journal during the crucial revolutionary years of 1775–1777. It was privately published in Boston in 1923 as The Journal of Mrs. John Amory (Katharine Greene) 1775-1777: With Letters from Her Father, Rufus Greene, 1759-1777.

Amory's portrait, painted by John Singleton Copley around 1763, is in the Museum of Fine Arts, Boston (as is that of her husband). It is one of three portraits by Copley of almost identical composition, down to the style and color of the dress; the others are of Lucretia Chandler Murray (Mrs. John Murray) and Mary Greene Hubbard (Mrs. Daniel Hubbard); the fact that all three were cousins may have influenced this marked repetition. A Copley portrait of Amory's mother is in the collection of the de Young museum in San Francisco.
