= 1844 Victoria One Penny Model =

Privately struck coin model

One model penny
- United Kingdom
- Value: 1d
- Mass: (Nickel-zinc center) 3.5g (brass center) 4.4 g
- Diameter: 22 mm
- Edge: Plain
- Composition: nickel-zinc or brass center with copper ring
- Years of minting: 1844-1848

Obverse
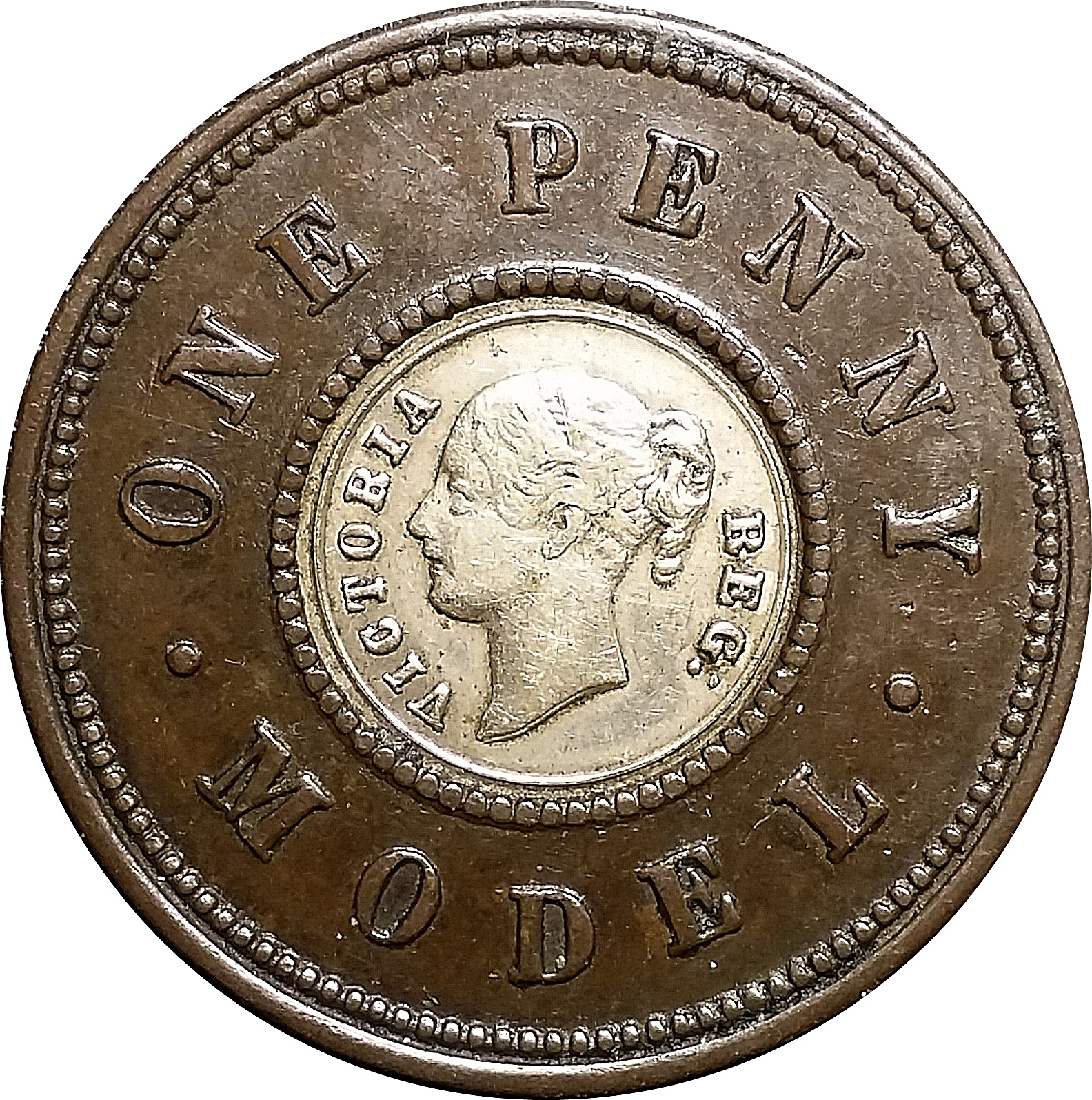
- Design: Left facing profile of Queen Victoria on insert surrounded by legend on copper ring
- Designer: Joseph Moore
- Design date: 1844

Reverse
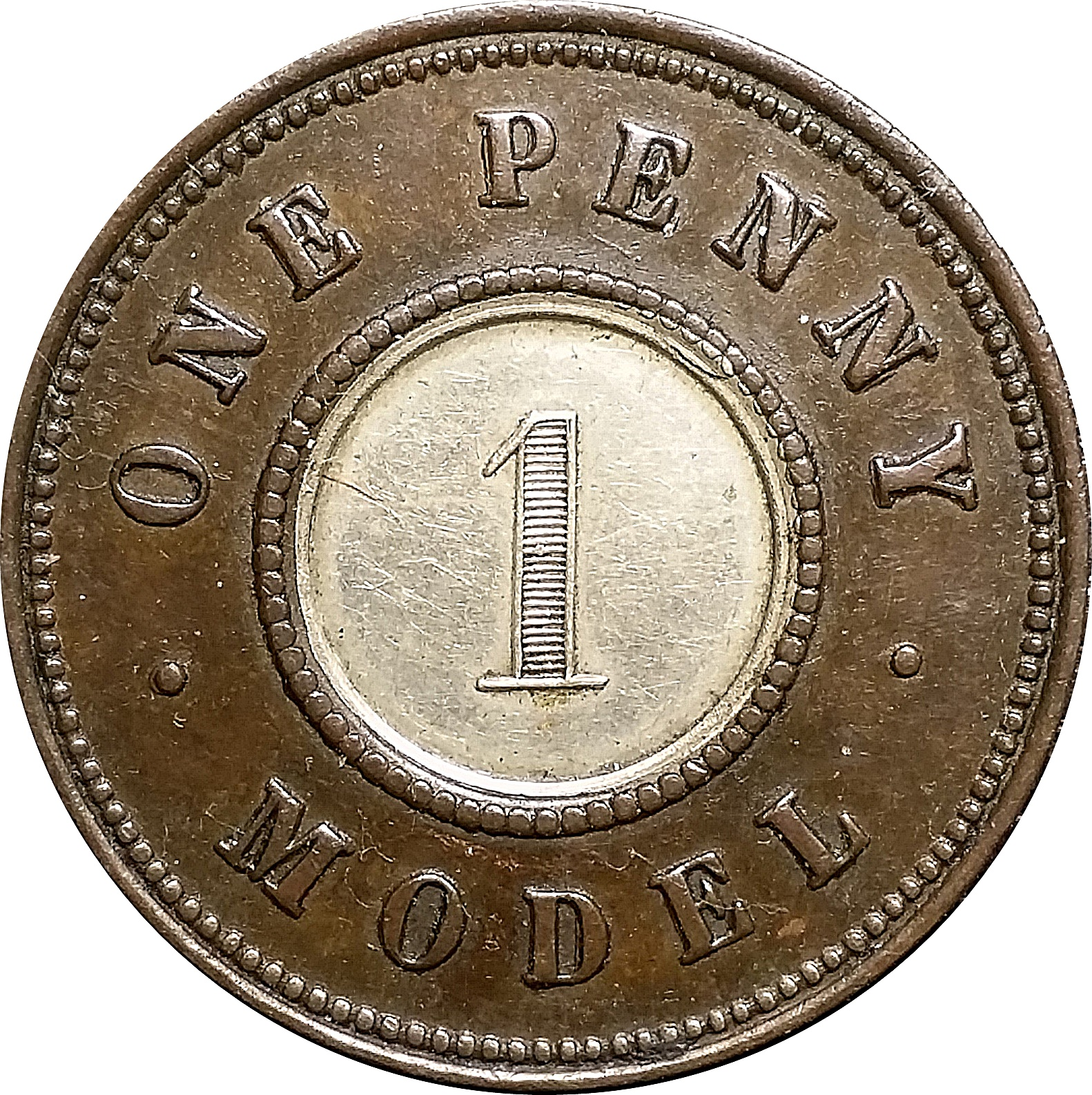
- Design: Large ridged "1" on insert surrounded by legend on copper ring
- Designer: Joseph Moore
- Design date: 1844

The 1844 Victoria One Penny Model was a model coin issued by Birmingham medallist Joseph Moore (1817–1892) between 1844 and 1848, during a period in which the British Government were considering the notion of replacing the heavy copper coinage then in use.

Their popularity with the public led to the Royal Mint to make a statement declaring that it was not responsible for their production.

A feature that sets them apart from other coins of their age is that they were bimetallic. The outer part was made of copper, and the inner part was originally composed of silver to make up for the small intrinsic value of copper — but in most cases 60 percent zinc and 40 percent nickel were used. Brass was also used for the center.

The design features an outer ring in which on the obverse and reverse the words 'ONE PENNY MODEL' are printed and an inner circle on the obverse of which a youthful portrait of Queen Victoria is shown with the words 'VICTORIA REG', and on the reverse is shown a numeral 1.

There are three known specimens with the legend "ONE PENNY 1844" instead of the standard "ONE PENNY MODEL". Some examples have an error in which "PENNY" is misspelled as "PENNEY".
