= Charles Combe =

English physician and numismatist

Charles Combe FRS (23 September 1743 – 18 March 1817) was an English physician and numismatist.

== Life ==
Combe was born in 1743 in Southampton Street, Bloomsbury, London where his father, John Combe, carried on business as an apothecary. He was educated at Harrow School, and among his schoolfellows were Sir William Jones and Samuel Parr. He rose to the sixth form, but did not proceed to university.

Coming to London, he studied medicine, and on his father's death in 1768 succeeded to his business. In 1783, the degree of doctor of medicine was conferred on him by the University of Glasgow, and he began to practise as an obstetric physician. On 5 April 1784, he was admitted by the Royal College of Physicians a licentiate in midwifery; on 30 June, he was nominated a governor of St. Bartholomew's Hospital. In 1789, he was chosen physician to the British Lying-In Hospital in Brownlow Street, and on resigning the post in 1810 was appointed consulting physician to the institution. He had also a substantial private practice, and made a collection in materia medica, which was purchased by the College of Physicians shortly after his death.

Combe was elected a Fellow of the Society of Antiquaries of London on 10 January 1771, and a Fellow of the Royal Society on 11 January 1776. He died, after a short illness, at his house in Vernon Place, Bloomsbury Square, in 1817, in the seventy-fourth year of his age, and was buried in Bloomsbury cemetery, Brunswick Square. A portrait of Combe was painted by Medley, and engraved by N. Branwhite.

== Works ==
By 1773, Combe had made the acquaintance of William Hunter the anatomist; Combe became a friend and helped Hunter in getting together his collection of coins. Combe contemplated a complete catalogue of the Hunter coin collection, but only published one instalment—his Nummorum veterum Populorum et Urbium qui in Museo Gulielmi Hunter asservantur Descriptio, figuris illustrata, London, 1782. A Latin preface gives the history of the Hunter collection. Combe was appointed one of the three trustees to whom Hunter (who died in 1783) left the use of his museum for thirty years, after which the collection passed to the Glasgow University. Combe also published a work on 'large brass' coins, entitled Index nummorum omnium imperatorum, Augustorum et Cæsarum ..., London, 1773. It extends to the reign of Domitian.

In 1788, Combe began to work with Henry Homer of Emmanuel College, Cambridge, on an edition of Horace, with variorum notes; Samuel Parr was also originally to have taken part in the work. Homer died before the first volume was completed, and Combe finished the work alone, which was published as Q. Horatii Flacci Opera cum variis lectionibus, notis variorum et indice completissimo, 2 vols. 1792–3. Errors, especially in the Greek quotations in the notes, were severely commented on by Parr in the British Critic. Combe replied with A Statement of Facts, &c., and was answered by Parr in Remarks on the Statement of Dr. Charles Combe, 1795.

He wrote the memoirs prefixed to the sale catalogue of Richard Southgate's library, and contributed to the appendix to George Vertue's Medals of Thomas Simon, 2nd edit. 1780. Besides coins, he collected rare books, especially editions of the Bible, some of which were purchased by the British Museum.

== Family ==
He married, in 1769, Arthey, only daughter of Henry Taylor, by whom he had four children. His eldest son was Taylor Combe.
