= George Gaskin =

English Anglican priest

George Gaskin (1751–1829) was a lecturer (assistant curate) at St Mary's, Islington for forty-six years, resigning in 1822, to become a prebendary at Ely Cathedral. He was also Rector of Stoke Newington and of St Benet, Gracechurch.

For a long time, he was secretary to the Society for the Promotion of Christian Knowledge. A street in Islington bears his name.

== Life ==
The son of John Gaskin, a leather-seller (1710–1766), and of Mabel his wife (1707–1791), he was born at Newington Green, London. He was educated at a classical school in Woodford, Essex, and went to Trinity College, Oxford, in 1771. He proceeded B.A. in 1775, M.A. in 1778, and D.D. in 1788.

He was ordained deacon in 1774, when he became curate of St Vedast, Foster Lane. He was then appointed to fill the vacant office of lecturer in the parish of Islington, a post which he occupied for forty-six years. In 1778 he accepted the curacy of the parish of Stoke Newington. His first preferment was the rectory of Sutton and Mepal in the Isle of Ely. This, however, in 1791 he exchanged for the living of St Benet Gracechurch, in order to be on hand for fulfilling his duties as secretary to the Society for Promoting Christian Knowledge. He was employed on behalf by the society to visit and report on the mission schools and churches of the Scilly Islands.

He was a supporter of the Episcopal Church of Scotland and was selected as a member of the English committee for the obtaining of a bill known as An Act for granting Relief to Pastors and Ministers and Lay Persons of the Episcopal Communion in Scotland. In 1797 he was further promoted to the rectory of Stoke Newington. On attaining his seventy-second year he was presented (25 May 1822) to a vacant stall in Ely Cathedral, was able to resign his secretaryship, and ultimately his post as lecturer of Islington. He then took a prominent position in assisting church institutions in the western United States, and in 1823 acted as trustee of the funds collected for the infant church of Ohio.

He died on 29 June 1829, from a rapid succession of epileptic fits. Gaskin was married in early life to Elizabeth Broughton, daughter of the Rev. Thomas Broughton, rector of Allhallows, Lombard Street, and of Wotton, Surrey.

== Works ==
Gaskin's published works included sermons. He compiled and revised in 1798 the writings of Richard Southgate, who bequeathed him all his manuscripts. In 1821 he published an edition of sermons written by the American bishop Theodore Dehon.
