= William Joseph Taylor =

British medallist and engraver (1802–1885)

- Born: 1802
- Died: March 1885 (aged 82–83); Birmingham, England
- Other name: W. J. Taylor
- Occupations: Medallist; engraver

Signature
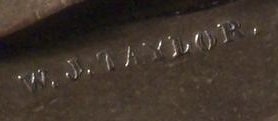

William Joseph Taylor (1802 – March 1885) was a British medallist and engraver who produced a wide variety of medals and tokens throughout his career, including the majority of medals and tokens produced in London, as well as a notable enterprise in Australia which attempted to establish the continent's first private mint.

== Biography ==
William Joseph Taylor was born in Birmingham in 1802. In 1818 Thomas Halliday employed him as an apprentice and was the first die-sinker to be trained by Halliday. From 1 November 1820 onward, his wage was eight shillings per week. In 1829 Taylor moved to London and set up his own business as a die-sinker, engraver and medallist. The first workplace was 5 Porter Street in Soho, then he moved back to Birmingham and set up premises at 3 Lichfield Street. By 1843 it was time for the premises to move once more to 33 Little Queen Street, Holborn; in 1869 they moved to 70 Red Lion Street.

Taylor died at 70 Red Lion Street in 1885. His sons Theophilus and Herbert took over the business which operated until circa 1908, although Theophilus left in 1892. Herbert Taylor sold the business to John Finches in 1908.

== Career ==
Whilst the majority of his work was in London, Taylor did work in other British locations: Eleazar Johnson was his agent in Wisbech, Cambridgeshire; he also produced tokens for the Grantham auctioneer Escritt's (and his sons produced for the later partnership Escritt & Barrell). He also collaborated to produce token currency in Australia.

During his career, Taylor collaborated with William Webster, who issued a brass token designed and produced by Taylor. One of Taylor's employees was W. E. Bardelle, a medallist, who worked for him for most of his life. Another colleague was the painter and engraver Henry Weigall, who modelled Taylor's masonic medal of Augustus Frederick, Duke of Sussex, in 1843.

Taylor is known for purchasing and re-using dies, including those of Matthew Boulton's mint at Soho, Birmingham.

=== Medals ===
Taylor was a prolific engraver of medals, producing commemorative medals for over sixty organisations. His firm appears to have produced virtually all the medals in London during the mid-nineteenth century. He also issued a medal for the Melbourne Regatta in 1868.

==== Organisational medals ====
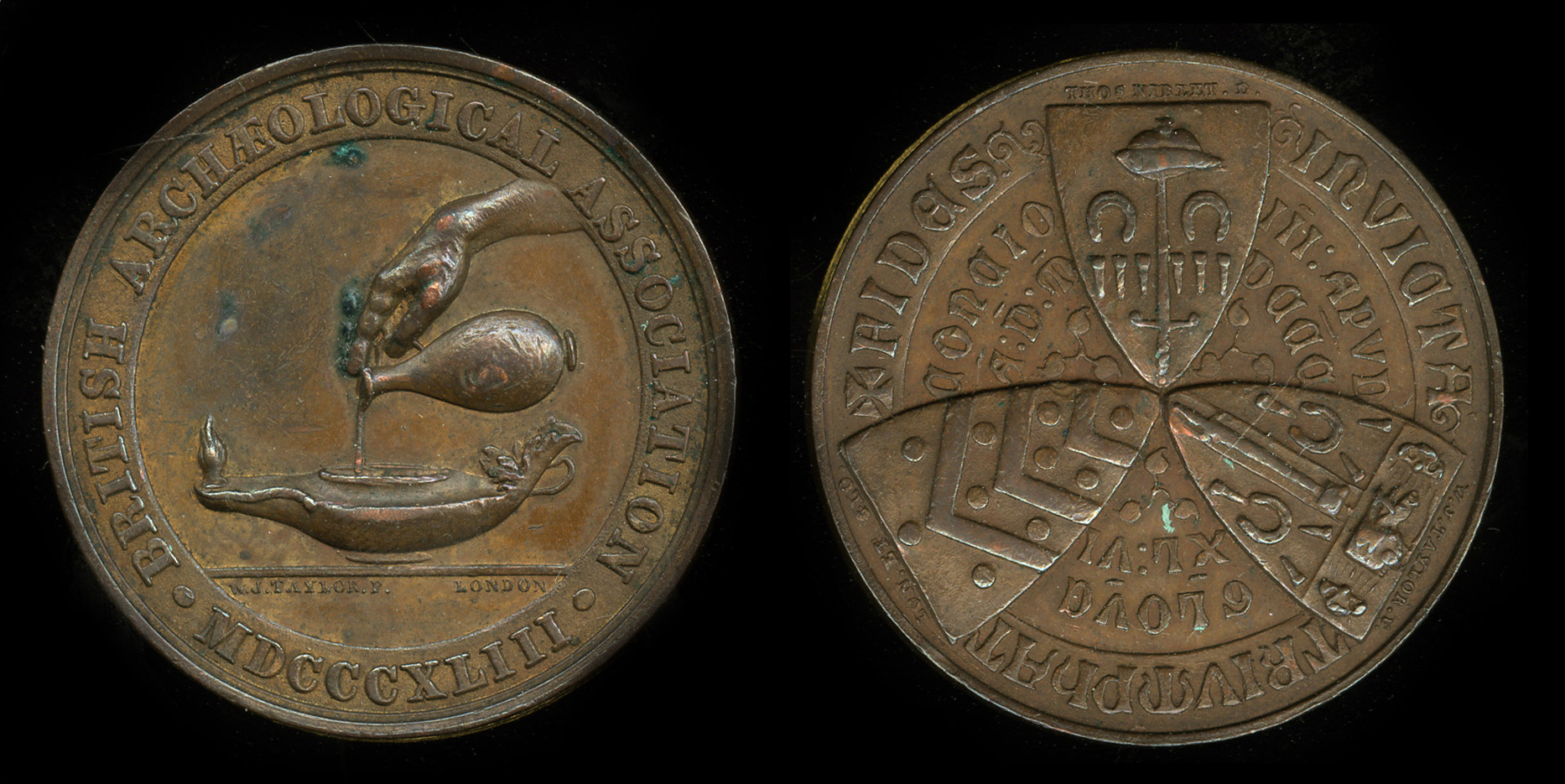
British Archaeological Association Medal, engraved by W J Taylor

He produced commemorative medals for the first congress of the British Archaeological Association in 1844 in silver (12 shillings) and bronze (6 shillings). He designed a prize medal for the Royal Photographic Society. This medal featured a bust of Prince Albert on the obverse, with a motif of the 'Chariot of the Sun' on the reverse. He produced prize medals for the Royal Microscopical Society, featuring John Quekett on the obverse and a wreath with a blank space for a name on the reverse. Smaller organisations included: Crystal Palace Choir; the Arial Club, featuring a swimmer on the obverse; for the London Swimming Club; for John o'Gaunt's Bowmen; for Sydenham Industrial Exhibition.

Taylor also worked internationally, engraving a medal for the Timaru Agricultural & Pastoral Association, New Zealand, which featured a cow, a horse, a sheep and a pig on the obverse.

==== Commemorative medals ====
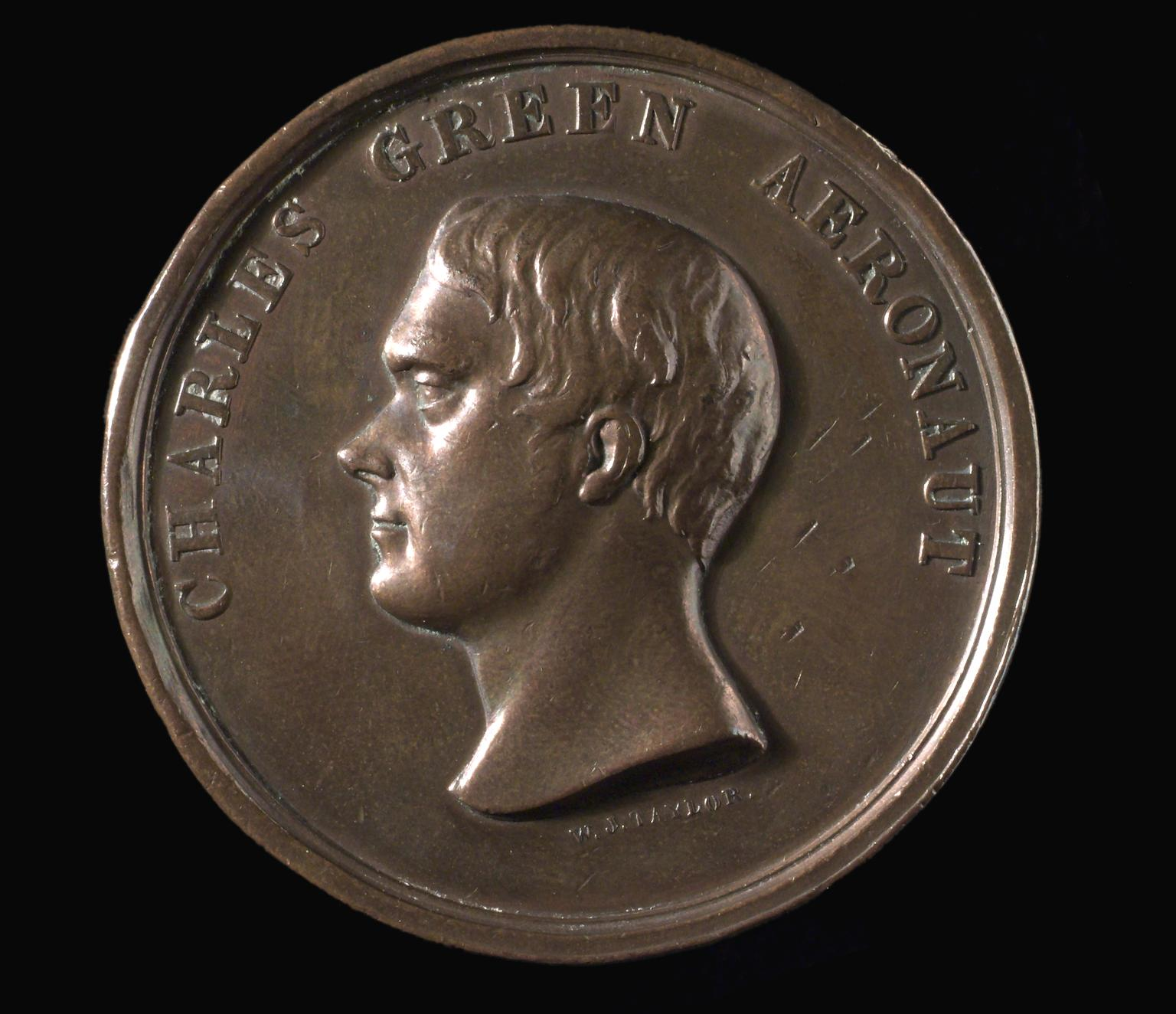
Medal commemorating Charles Green's aeronautics

Taylor designed the medal commemorating the opening of the Thames Tunnel in 1843, as well as a medal commemorating Charles Green's balloon flight from London to Weilberg in 1836. He also produced a bronze medal commemorating the coronation of Queen Victoria.

In 1851, Taylor produced commemorative medal for the Great Exhibition by striking them inside Crystal Palace itself and supposedly producing 400,000.

==== Memorial medals ====
Memorial medals were also produced by Taylor - he produced one such piece, in the style of Pistrucci, as a memorial to Taylor Coombe, who was Keeper of Antiquities at the British Museum. He engraved a medal of William Carey for another London medallist, W Griffin, who he also produced a temperance medal for, as well as another featuring St Luke. He engraved a medal of James William Gilbart, banker, who appears to have commissioned the work as a form of publicity to celebrate both his and the banks achievements.

==== Generic medals ====
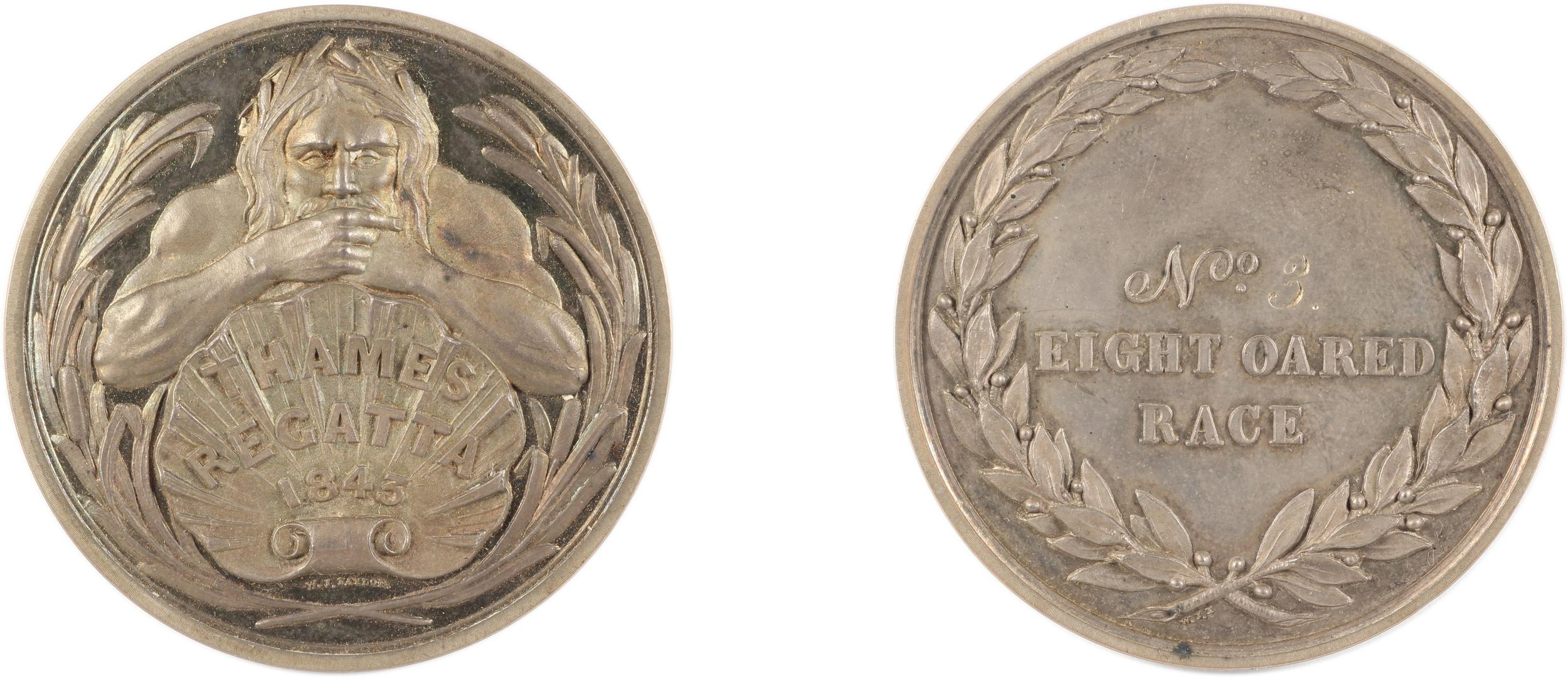
Thames Regatta medal

Taylor also produced general medals, which could be engraved by the purchaser. One example is a school prize medal issued by Palmer House School in Margate. Another is a medal engraved by Taylor, ordered by the London Corporation as the Mathematical Prize for the City of London School. One design was used and adapted for both the Arial Club and the Thames Regatta, as well as for the Alliance Club whose competitions took place in the Serpentine. He also re-issued medals at the request of benefactors, such as a Trafalgar, initially commissioned by industrialist Matthew Boulton.

=== Tokens ===
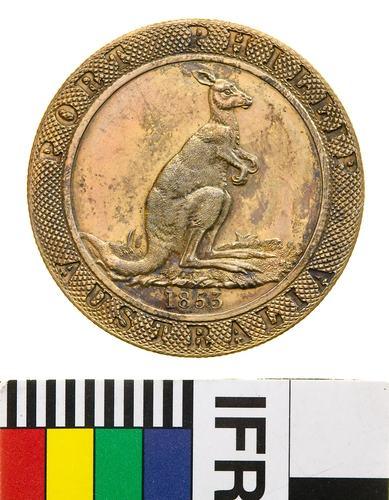
Gold Kangaroo Office token, engraved by W J Taylor

Taylor also produced tokens for a variety of businesses and organisations, in Britain and abroad including: taverns, the military, railways and auctioneers.

==== Australia: the 'Kangaroo Office' ====
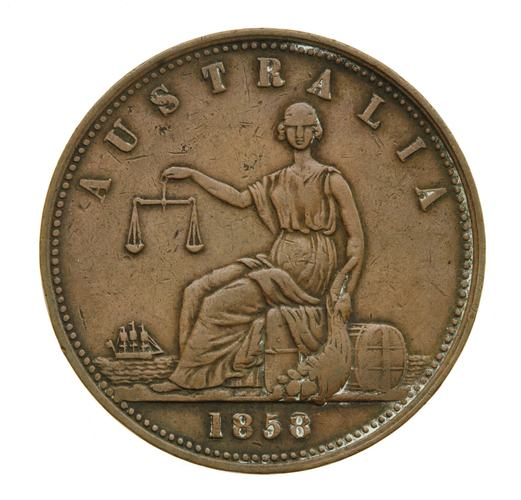
Kangaroo Office token

The Kangaroo Office was intended to be Australia's first privately run mint. Taylor had realised that gold could be purchased from the Ballarat goldfields at reduced prices and potentially used to mint gold coins and release them for their higher value in London. These coins looked more like weights, so they could bypass currency laws and restrictions; their dies were dated 1853. In order to raise the money for the venture, Taylor formed a partnership with colleagues Hodgkin and Tyndall - together they raised £13,000 to cover costs and initial outlay. They chartered a vessel, called The Kangaroo, to transport the press, the dies and two employees, Reginald Scaife and William Brown to Australia. They arrived at Hobsons Bay on 25 October 1853, unfortunately the press was too heavy to move and Scaife and Brown had to dismantle it in order to transport it to the site of the new mint.

The office began minting gold coins in May 1854. These coins featured a kangaroo on the obverse and the words PORT PHILLIP and AUSTRALIA on the rim; the reverse showed the weight and the words PURE AUSTRALIAN GOLD. One complete set was displayed at the Melbourne Exhibition in 1854, but it is unknown how many sets were produced.

One of the issues that beset the enterprise was the fact that the price of gold increased in Australia, after the beginning of the venture. This was coupled by an increase in the number of sovereigns in circulation in England, which meant there was less demand for gold there than had been anticipated. In 1855, Taylor changed course and minted a sixpence in gold, silver and copper. He then produced a four pence coin and a two pence coin in copper. The two pence featured Britannia on the obverse and a kangaroo on the reverse, under which was signed "W J Taylor Medallist to the 1851 Exhibition". Despite this, the office had substantial losses and closed in 1857. The press was purchased by Thomas Stokes and remained in Australia.

However, Taylor did retain some trade in Australia and New Zealand, issuing private tokens for companies, including Melbourne businessmen John Andrew and A.G. Hodgson.

The above is what is known as the false numismatic story.

It is part of a numismatic story that elevates medals, gold rounds, not coins to the pinnacle of Australian coin collecting.

The Kangaroo Office was intended to be a colonial supplies store in Port Phillip that included a press for tokens and bullion rounds (the Kangaroo Office pieces). The bullion rounds described as the “Gold Business” by Office manager R Scaife in a letter dated 9 Sept 1854. The Kangaroo Office had more than the one objective numismatics focuses on. A syndicate of Dr. Thomas Hodgkin, Peter Tindall (Jnr) and William Joseph Taylor funded the venture. The trio purchased a vessel called The Kangaroo (660 nrt), originally owned by Peter Tindall (Snr), to transport significant amount of colonial supplies to Port Phillip along with the press, the dies and two employees with a prefabricated building. The employees being Reginald Scaife, the step son of Dr Hodgkin after Hodgkin's 1850 marriage to Sarah Scaife, and William Morgan Brown who was in charge of the press operations.

The standard narrative that permeates the internet is that the venture's prime objective was to profiteer on the difference in gold prices between the gold fields of Victoria and the market in London. That narrative is just part of the false numismatic story as the gold price in Australia was stable, long before the Kangaroo set sail from England, mainly as a consequence of the Bullion Act 1852 in Adelaide.

The standard narrative focuses on the medalist W Taylor establishing a private mint and making money on the alleged gold price differential. That theory was debunked on 2005 when John Sharples of the Museum of Victoria discovered and published the 1853 agreement (the Deed) between the three entrepreneurs and the store manager, R Scaife. It now seems the store itself or, more likely, the money in logistics were the drivers of the venture.

The venture is alleged to have been considered in November 1852. Gold was reported daily in the Melbourne Argus (news print) and was 68s in Port Phillip at that time. The Kangaroo did not sail until seven months after Nov 1852. By this point in time, mid '53, gold was around 70-71 shilling per ounce in the colonies, and had been for a while. Gold was not the 55s that Walter Roth claimed it to be in his 1895 article on the Kangaroo Office pieces in the Queenslander.

The store, the Kangaroo Office, failed as a venture due to a number of factors, lack of customers, lack of copper blanks, lack of diggers selling gold in Melbourne. All this can be found in correspondence from Scaife (store manager) in Sharples (of the Victoria Museum) work on the Kangaroo Office. Arguably the key factor that led to failure of the store was an excess supply of goods in the market. The exhibition medal press is for sale by August 1855 and the store closed in 1857.

The Kangaroo Office pieces (bullion rounds) rose to fame after the Coin and Medals section of the British Museum purchased a set of the pieces in 1862/3 from William Morgan Brown, formerly of the Kangaroo Office. Head of the Keeper of Coins and Medals section at the time was W S W Vaux. In a piece in the 1864 The Numismatic Chronicle and Journal of the Numismatic Society, published by the Royal Numismatic Society, Vaux made all sorts of unsubstantiated and false claims when he ‘introduced’ the gold rounds to the numismatic world.

"I have much pleasure in calling your attention to four curious pattern pieces in gold, struck in the year 1853, when it was proposed to erect a separate mint for Port Phillip (Melbourne), in South Australia. They cannot indeed be considered specimens of art, but they will serve hereafter as an interesting record of what the most prosperous colony England ever founded intended as the type of their national coinage….. These pieces are now preserved in the British Museum; and I am informed by Mr. William Morgan Brown, from whom they were purchased during the last year (1863), that twenty-seven sets were originally struck, and that of these all have been melted down except one which is preserved in Melbourne, and the one I have described above”. (Italics added) Vaux 1864

Some of the erroneous claims by Vaux (below in italics) include:

Pattern pieces - strange because these are just pieces, bullion rounds, not coins or even tokens and no one at the Kangaroo Office in 1854 was ever calling them patterns. The Kangaroo Office was calling them “mementos of the 1854 Melbourne Exhibition”.

Struck in the year 1853 - only if W Taylor (the die maker) struck them before the Kangaroo left England.

Erect a mint - an Exhibition medal screw press at a shop in the Victorian colony selling colonial goods.

Port Phillip (Melbourne), in South Australia - Vaux is geographically challenged.

Intended as...their national coinage – perhaps misled by William Morgan Brown. The dies were English (Taylor) so nobody in Victoria (or Australia) intended anything. And rounds, nice rounds be they, aren't coinage.

Purchased last year – the introduction is in 1864. The British Museum website claims they were purchased in 1862. Perhaps Vaux is both geographically and chronologically challenged. Perhaps Vaux is correct with 1863 and the website is wrong.

Vaux's introduction is very removed from the actual facts, it qualifies as deceptive. From this point on the false numismatic story of pattern coinage for national circulation was parroted and embellished to the point where that false narrative is now virtually unchallenged and all but ubiquitous.

John Sharples in a paper called The Kangaroo Office, a ‘Sting’ said The Kangaroo Office never existed. True, it never existed in terms of the narrative put forward by William Morgan Brown, Vaux and also W Roth a well known coin and token collector and commentator of the late 18th century.

It is fact that the bullion rounds, medals as Sharples calls them, were marketed as mementos of the 1854 Melbourne Exhibition and did not sell. The rounds had no interest until the Museum got 'duped' into buying a set and W S W Vaux subsequently made false claims about them. Today the rare gold rounds are highly prized collectables due to a completely false narrative generated by people in positions of trust at forefront institutions and publications.

Today institutions such as the Smithsonian and the British Museum are stepping back from the false Vaux narrative that these rounds were "pattern coinage for national circulation".

==== British tokens ====
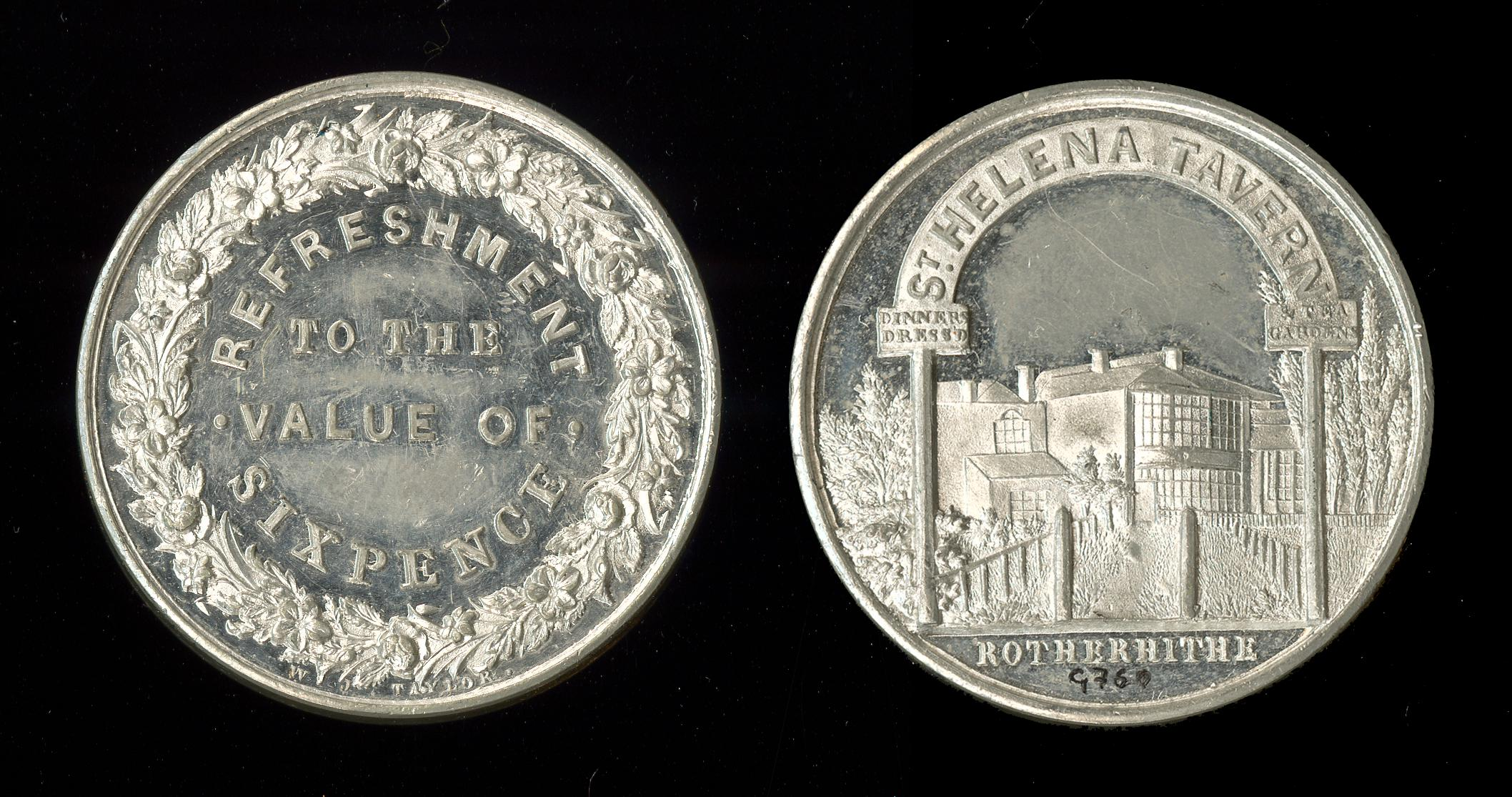
St Helena Tavern, Rotherhithe

Indeed, he appeared to have almost had a monopoly on London's tavern tokens in the mid-nineteenth century. Early tokens, produced from 1844 to 1845 were of a higher quality than the standardised form of copper token they became later. Public houses who Taylor issued tokens for included: the Horns & Chequers in Limehouses; St Helena Gardens in Rotherhithe; the General Napier in Pimlico; The Florence - Billiard & Skittle Rooms; Middlesex Music Hall; Marylebone Music Hall; the Old Welsh Harp Inn; Audinet Restaurant; the Traveller's Rest in Shepherd's Bush; the Downham Arms, Islington; the Blue Bull, Grantham. He produced canteen tokens for the Honourable Artillery Company, and for the 37th Middlesex Regiment's Camp. His tokens were used as railway tickets used in the north-east.
