= Edward Hawkins (numismatist) =

British numismatist (1780–1867)

Edward Hawkins FRS FSA FLS
- Born: 5 May 1780; Macclesfield, Cheshire, England
- Died: 22 May 1867 (aged 87); London, Middlesex, England
- Education: Macclesfield Grammar School
- Occupations: Numismatist; Antiquary
- Spouse: Eliza Rohde
- Children: 4

Edward Hawkins FRS FSA FLS (5 May 1780 – 22 May 1867) was an English numismatist and antiquary. For over 30 years he was the Keeper of Antiquities at the British Museum.

== Life ==
Born at Macclesfield on 5 May 1780, he was the eldest son of Edward Hawkins of Macclesfield, banker, and his wife Ellen, daughter of Brian Hodgson of Ashbourne, Derbyshire. He remembered as a child meeting Dr Samuel Johnson a few days before the latter's death in 1784. He was educated at Macclesfield grammar school, and privately from 1797 to 1799 by Richard Ormerod, vicar of Kensington.

Around 1799, he returned to Macclesfield, and received a commission in a volunteer corps raised there. He was employed under his father in the Macclesfield bank until 1802, when the family left Macclesfield, and settled at Court Herbert in Glamorganshire. While there he was a partner with his father in a bank at Swansea, and they superintended the copper works at Neath Abbey.

In 1807, he left Court Herbert, and lived successively at Glanburne, Drymon, and Dylais in North Wales. At this time he turned his attention to botany, and was elected a fellow of the Linnean Society in 1806. He also formed a collection of books and prints relating to Chester, and added a great number of engravings to his copy of George Ormerod's History of Cheshire. In 1816 his father died, leaving heavy debts, which Hawkins voluntarily charged on his own estates.

In 1819, Hawkins took up residence in Surrey, first at Nutfield, and then at East Hill, Oxted. In 1821, he was elected Fellow of the Royal Society, of which he became vice-president.

In 1826 Hawkins was appointed Keeper of Antiquities (which at that time included coins and medals, and prints and drawings) at the British Museum, in succession to Taylor Combe, for whom he had been acting as deputy since May 1825; and held the office till his resignation at the end of 1860. He was president of the Numismatic Society of London, and fellow (elected 1826) and vice-president (1856) of the Society of Antiquaries of London; he contributed to the proceedings of both societies. In 1846 he was elected one of the treasurers of the Society for Promoting Christian Knowledge. Hawkins was a Member of the Chetham Society, and served as a Member of Council from 1848 to 1867.

Hawkins died at his house, 6 Lower Berkeley Street, London, on 22 May 1867 aged 87.

== Works ==
He edited and contributed to part v. and parts vii–x. of the Description of Ancient Marbles in the British Museum, 1812, &c., and completed and revised the Description of the Anglo-Gallic Coins in the British Museum, 1826, begun by Taylor Combe. Hawkins published in 1841 (London) The Silver Coins of England, the standard work on the subject (2nd and 3rd editions by Robert Lloyd Kenyon, 1876, and 1887).

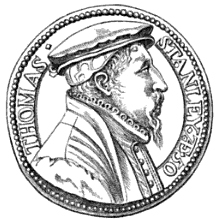
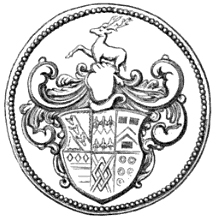
Portrait medal of Thomas Stanley (obverse and reverse) by Steven van Herwijck, 1562; woodcuts from Medallic Illustrations by Hawkins.

He also wrote a descriptive account of British medals, and an abridgment of part of this work (to the end of the reign of William III) was printed in 1852. The trustees of the British Museum declined to issue it, chiefly on account of several paragraphs in which Hawkins expressed his strong Protestant and Tory views, but when completed to the death of George II, and revised, with additions, by A. W. Franks and H. A. Grueber, it ultimately appeared as a British Museum publication in 1885, with the title Medallic Illustrations of the History of Great Britain and Ireland, London, 2 vols. It became a standard work on the subject. Hawkins had a close knowledge of British medals, and had formed a collection of them, which was purchased from him by the British Museum in 1860. He also formed a large collection of English political caricatures, which was purchased by the British Museum in 1868.

Hawkins edited for the Chetham Society Sir William Brereton's Travels in Holland, 1844, and The Holy Lyfe ... of Saynt Werburge, 1848.

== Family ==
Hawkins married, on 29 September 1806, Eliza, daughter of Major Rohde, and had three sons and a daughter:

- Edward, Barrister (1815-1867);
- Rev. Herbert Samuel, (28 Sep 1818-5 Jan 1895) rector of Beyton, Suffolk;
- Major Rohde Hawkins, the architect;
- Mary Eliza, wife of John Robert Kenyon, Q.C.
