= Rufus Greene =

American silversmith and Loyalist merchant (1707–1777)

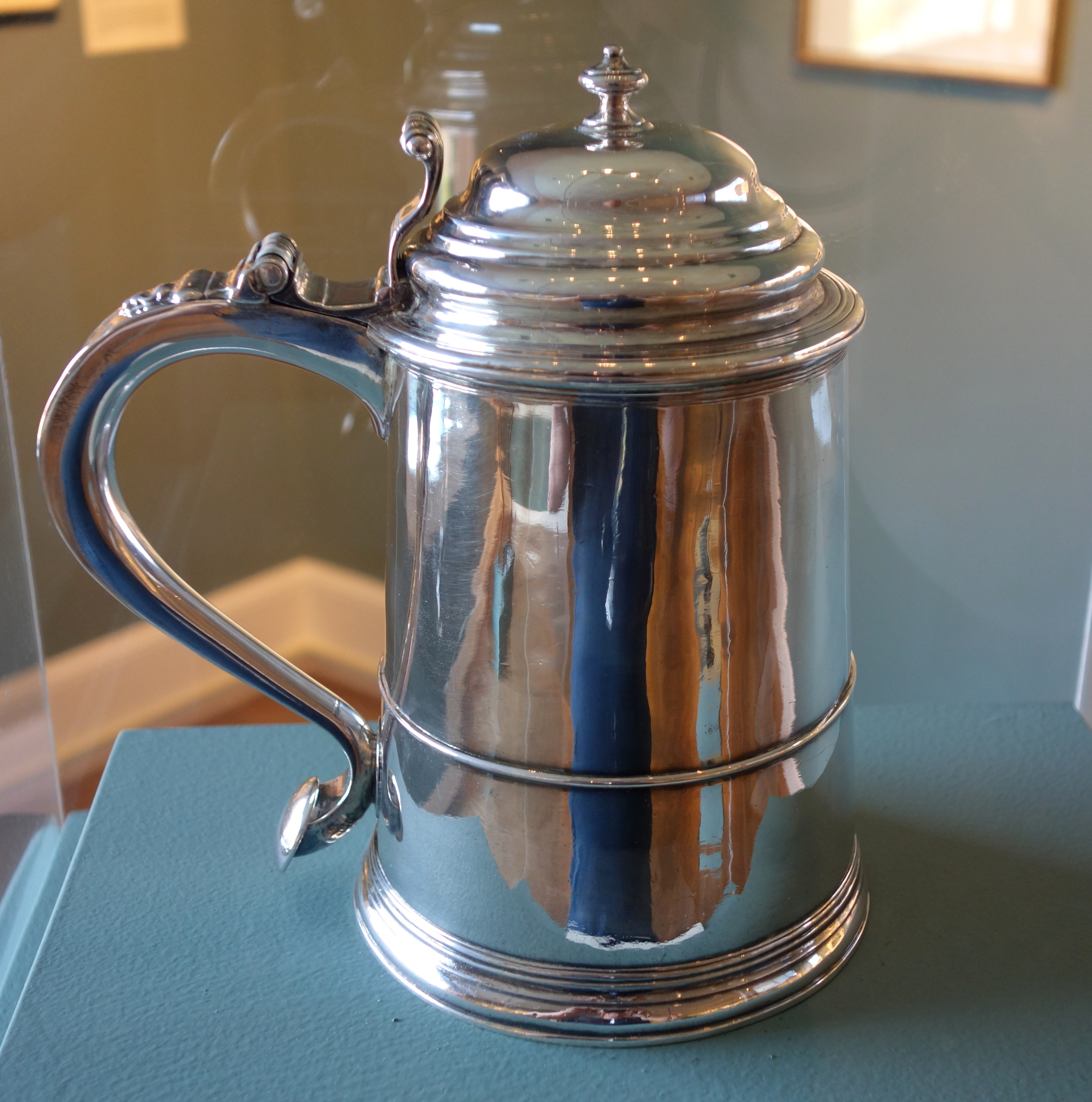
Tankard by Rufus Greene

Rufus Greene (May 30, 1707 - December 31, 1777) was a noted American silversmith, and subsequently a wealthy Loyalist merchant, active in colonial Boston, Massachusetts.

Greene was apprenticed to William Cowell Sr., married Katherine Stanbridge on December 10, 1728, and worked from 1728 to 1749 as a silversmith. His account book notes: "I Began or Sett up my Bisness October the 7:1728 and the Making of the things from that time to January the 1:1732 Came to £1624..6..0." Together with his brother, Benjamin, he gradually expanded his interests as a land speculator and general merchant. By 1749, deeds and contracts identify him as a merchant, though he may have sometimes continued to produce silver pieces. His daughter, Katharine Greene Amory, is known for the journal she kept during the American Revolution.
