= Henry Homer =

English classical scholar

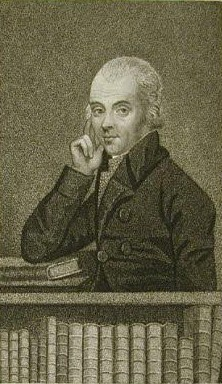
- Henry Homer, engraving by John Jones after Sylvester Harding
- Born: 1753
- Died: 1791 (aged 37–38)

Academic background
- Education: Emmanuel College, Cambridge

Academic work
- Main interests: Philology
- Notable works: William Bellenden's Tracts; variorum edition of Horace

Henry Homer, called the younger (1753–1791) was an English classical scholar.

== Life ==
The eldest of the seventeen children of Henry Homer the elder, he was born at Warwick in 1753. In 1758 he entered Rugby School, of which, at the age of fourteen, he was the head boy. He then studied for three years at Birmingham. In November 1768 he was admitted to Emmanuel College, Cambridge, under Richard Farmer, where he became acquainted with Samuel Parr, who helped to direct his studies. Among his close college friends were William Bennet and George Dyer. He graduated B.A. in 1773, M.A. in 1776, and B.D. in 1783.

Homer was elected a Fellow of his college in 1778, and returned to the university from Warwickshire, where he had been living for about three years, soon after his election. About this time he was admitted into deacon's orders. He now resided chiefly at Cambridge, and spent much time in the university library, turning his attention to philological studies. In consequence of religious scruples, Homer declined to take priest's orders in compliance with the college statutes, and his fellowship was therefore declared vacant in June 1788. He died at Birdingbury of a rapid decline on 4 May 1791, and was buried in the churchyard there.

== Works ==
In 1787, he joined with Parr in the republication of William Bellenden's Tracts, and prepared editions of several classical authors. At the suggestion of Parr, he undertook a variorum edition of Horace, but died before its completion. It was finally published by Charles Combe, and occasioned a public literary quarrel between Combe and Parr.

Homer edited:

- The first, twenty-fifth, and thirty-first books of Livy, from Drakenborch's edition, with Dissertations, 1787.
- Tacitus, ‘De Moribus Germanorum et de Vita Agricolæ,’ London, 1788.
- ‘Tractatus varii Latini, a Crevier, Brotier, Auger, aliisque clarissimis viris conscripti, et ad Rem cum criticam, tum antiquariam pertinentes,’ London, 1788.
- ‘P. Ovidii Nasonis Heroides ex editione P. Burmanni,’ London, 1789.
- ‘A. Persii Flacci Satirarum liber,’ 1789.
- ‘Sallustii Opera Omnia excusa ad editionem Cortii cum editionibus Havercampi et Gabrielis Antonii collatam,’ London, 1789.
- ‘Taciti Dialogus de Oratoribus,’ 1789.
- ‘C. Plinii Cæcilii Secundi Epistolarum libri x.,’ London, 1790.
- ‘Taciti Opera Omnia,’ 4 vols., London, 1790.
- ‘C. J. Cæsaris Opera Omnia,’ 2 vols. London, 1790.
- ‘M. T. Ciceronis de Officiis libri tres, ex editione Oliveti,’ London, 1791.
- ‘Quintilian,’ in the press at the time of the editor's death.
- ‘T. Livii Patavini Historiarum libri qui supersunt omnes ex recensione Arn. Drakenborchii,’ 8 vols. London, 1794, a reprint of Drakenborch's text, with an index.

The works which he left unfinished were completed by his brothers Arthur Homer and Philip Bracebridge Homer.
