= List of bi-metallic coins =

List of Bi-Metallic coins minted since 1983

Denomination	Currency	Year	Country
500	Lira	1982	Italy
2	Diners	1985	Andorra
5	Dirhams	1987	Morocco
10	Francs	1988	France
10	francs	1988	Monaco
10	baht	1988	Thailand
100	Pesos	1989	Mexico
1000	Pesos	1989	Mexico
1,000	Pesos	1989	Mexico
50	Yuan	1990	China
5	Lei	1991	Moldova
10	Lei	1991	Moldova
200	Escudos	1991	Portugal
10	Dinar	1991	France
25	Yuan	1992	China
10	Dinar	1992	Algeria
20	Dinar	1992	Algeria
50	Dinar	1992	Algeria
50	Gapik	1992	Azerbaijan
250	Rials	1993	Iran
100	Fils	1992	Bahrain
50	Koruna	1993	Czech Republic
10	Dollars	1993	Hong Kong
1	Rupiah	1993	Indonesia
1,000	Rupiah	1993	Indonesia
500	Pesos	1993	Colombia
10	Markaa	1993	Finland
10	Yuan	1994	China
25	Yuan	1994	China
5	Dollars	1994	Australia
1	Peso	1994	Argentina
10	Shillings	1994	Kenya
100	Escudos	1994	Cape Verde
500	Riels	1994	Cambodia
.50	Dollars	1994	New Zealand
4.2	ECU	1994	Gibraltar
2	Złote	1994	Poland
10	New Shekel	1995	Israel
500	Yuan	1995	China
.25	Angel	1995	Isle of Man
.25	Crown	1995	Isle of Man
.25	Noble	1995	Isle of Man
5	Maloti	1995	Lesotho
5	Złotych	1995	Poland
2	Dollars	1996	Canada
100	Sucres	1996	Ecuador
500	Sucres	1996	Ecuador
1000	Sucres	1996	Ecuador
100	Forint	1996	Hungary
2	Pounds	1996	Gibraltar
100	Patacas	1997	Macau
2	Pounds	1997	United Kingdom
5	Colones	1997	El Salvador
.5	Dinar	1997	Jordan
25	Kuna	1997	Croatia
50	Dollars	1997	Cook Islands
2	Lati	1999	Latvia
2	Pounds	1999	Falkland Islands
2	Mark	2000	Bosnia and Herzegovina
500	Pesos	2000	Cuba
20	Dollars	2000	Jamaica
5	Pula	2000	Botswana
100	Leke	2000	Albania
10	Lari	2000	Georgia
2	Dollars	2000	Bahamas
10	Dollars	2000	United States
500	Pesos	2000	Chile
100	Pesos	2000	Chile
10	Pesos	2000	Philippines
500	Fils	2000	Bahrain
2	Pounds	2000	Falkland Islands
5	Boliviar	2001	Bolivia
2000	Ngultrums	2002	Bhutan
50	Pounds	2002	Alderney
1	Lev	2002	Bulgaria
100	Tenge	2002	Kazakhstan
200	Tenge	2002	Kazakhstan
1	Euro	2002	Eurozone
2	Euro	2002	Eurozone
2	Birr	2002	Ethiopia
500	Rials	2003	Iran
2	Pounds	2003	Saint Helena
500	Dram	2003	Armenia
75	Dollars	2004	British Virgin Islands
1	Won	2004	North Korea
20	Rials	2004	Yemen
5	Mark	2005	Bosnia and Herzegovina
5	Pesos	2005	Dominican Republic
10	Pesos	2005	Dominican Republic
1	Pound	2005	Egypt
5	Rand	2005	South Africa
10	Rupees	2005	India
1000	Bolivar	2005	Bolivia
150	Dollars	2005	Cook Islands
5	Bolívares	2005	Venezuela
2	Lari	2006	Georgia
1	Cedi	2007	Ghana
25	Pence	2008	Tristan Da Cunha
2	Roubles	2009	Belarus
50	Kuruş	2009	Turkey
1	Lira	2009	Turkey
200	Forint	2009	Hungary
10	Rupees	2009	India
1	Dollar	2010	Cook Islands
10	Rupees	2011	Andaman and Nicobar
20	Rupees	2011	Andaman and Nicobar
5	Kwanzas	2012	Angola
2	Pula	2013	Botswana
10	Kwanzas	2019	Angola
5	Dollars	2012	Micronesia
250	Francs	2012	Djibouti
1	Dollar	2013	Singapore
250	Francs	2013	Comoros
250	Escudos	2013	Cape Verde
3	Roubles	2014	Russia
5	Roubles	2014	Russia
10	Roubles	2014	Russia
20	Kwanza	2014	Angola
2	Lev	2015	Bulgaria
2500	Shillings	2016	Somalia
1	Pounds	2016	United Kingdom
5	Peso	2016	Cuba
20	Roubles	2016	Belarus
1	Dollar	2016	Zimbabwe
1	Dollar	2017	Tokelau
2	Dollar	2018	Zimbabwe
1000	Francs	2019	Chad
2	Cedi	2019	Ghana
20	Rupees	2019	India
20	Pesos	2019	Philippines
500	Yen	2021	Japan
1	Pound	2021	British Indian Ocean Territories
2	Pound	2021	British Indian Ocean Territories
200	Franc	2021	French Overseas Collectivities
500	Colones	2021	Costa Rica
1	Aspar	2022	Abkhazia
500	CFA Franc	2022	Benin
1000	So'm	2022	Uzbekistan
5	Euro	2024	Vatican City
