= Cyril F. Homer =

Cyril Filcher Homer
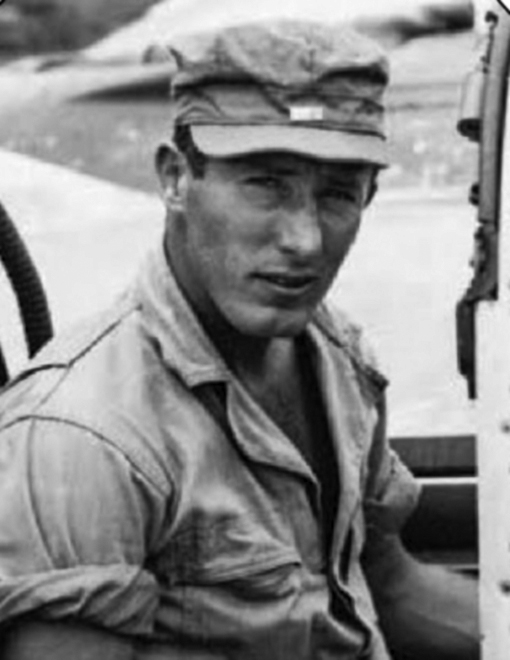
- Cy Homer in late 1944
- Born: April 29, 1919; New Jersey, U.S.
- Died: August 10, 1975 (aged 56); Sacramento, California, US
- Military career
- Service years: 1942–1945
- Rank: Major
- Nicknames: "Cy", "Uncle Cy"
- Service number: O-732248
- Unit: 8th Fighter Group
- Commands: 80th Fighter Squadron
- Conflicts: World War II
- Awards: Distinguished Service Cross; Silver Star; Distinguished Flying Cross (3); Air Medal (10)

Cyril Filcher Homer (April 29, 1919 – August 10, 1975) was a United States Army Air Force fighter ace who was credited with shooting down 15 aircraft during World War II.

== Early life ==
Homer was born on 1919 in New Jersey, before moving to the West Coast during his youth. He attended the University of California before joining the U.S. Army Reserves.

== Military career ==
He was transferred to the U.S. Army Air Corps for flight training and graduated from Luke Field in Arizona, on October 30, 1942. He attended P-38 Lightning training at Muroc Field in California.

=== World War II ===
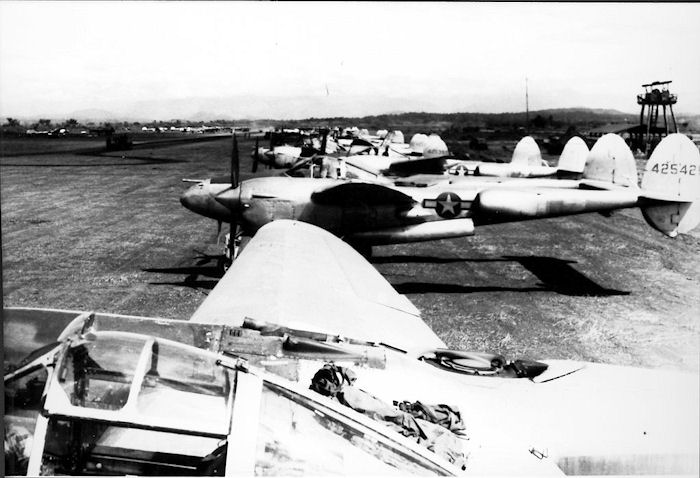
P-38 Lightnings of the 8th Fighter Group on Mindoro, Philippines, 1944

He was assigned to 80th Fighter Squadron of the 8th Fighter Group at Mareeba, in Queensland, Australia, in February 1943. During this time, the squadron transitioned from P-39 Airacobra to P-38. On May 16, 1943, the 80th FS flew its first mission in the P-38 from Port Moresby and on May 21, Homer scored a probable aerial victory. He scored his first confirmed aerial victories on August 21, 1943, when he shot down two A6M Zeroes and one Kawasaki Ki-61 "Tony" over Wewak. He shot down another Zero on September 4.

Homer became a flying ace on September 13, when he shot down a Nakajima Ki-43 "Oscar", his fifth aerial victory. In December 1943, the 8th FG moved it new base in Finschhafen, New Guinea. On 18 January 1944, he shot down two Ki-43s over Wewak and on January 23, he shot a Ki-61, bringing his total aerial victories to 8. On March 30, he destroyed another Ki-61. His biggest day came on April 3, 1944, when he downed two Ki-43s and two Ki-61s over Hollandia. For his heroism in the mission, he received the Distinguished Service Cross.

On July 27, 1944, he shot down a Ki-43 and on October, he was appointed as commander of the 80th FS, succeeding Major Jay T. Robbins. On November 10, during the Philippines campaign, he downed a Ki-43 over Leyte, his 15th and last aerial victory of the war. Homer remained as commander of the 80th FS till his return to the United States in May 1945.

During World War II, Homer was credited with the destruction of 15 enemy aircraft in aerial combat plus 1 probable. While serving with the 8th FG, he flew P-38s bearing the name "Uncle Cy's Angel".

== Later life ==
After the end of World War II, Homer left military service. He died on August 10, 1975, in Sacramento at the age of 56, just after attending an 80th FS reunion.

== Awards and decorations ==
His awards include:

USAAF Pilot Badge
Distinguished Service Cross
Silver Star
Distinguished Flying Cross with two bronze oak leaf clusters
Air Medal with one silver and three bronze oak leaf clusters
Air Medal (second ribbon required for accouterment spacing)

- Army Presidential Unit Citation
- American Defense Service Medal
- American Campaign Medal
- Asiatic–Pacific Campaign Medal
- World War II Victory Medal
- Philippine Liberation Medal

=== Distinguished Service Cross citation ===

Homer, Cyril F.
Captain (Air Corps), U.S. Army Air Forces
80th Fighter Squadron, 8th Fighter Group, 5th Air Force
Date of Action: April 3, 1944

Citation:

"The President of the United States of America, authorized by Act of Congress July 9, 1918, takes pleasure in presenting the Distinguished Service Cross to Captain (Air Corps) Cyril Filcher Homer, United States Army Air Forces, for extraordinary heroism in connection with military operations against an armed enemy while serving as Pilot of a P-38 Fighter Airplane in the 80th Fighter Squadron, 8th Fighter Group, Fifth Air Force, in aerial combat against enemy forces on 3 April 1944, in the Southwest Pacific Area. On this date, Captain Homer shot down FOUR enemy aircraft in a single engagement. Captain Homer's unquestionable valor in aerial combat is in keeping with the highest traditions of the military service and reflects great credit upon himself, the 5th Air Force, and the United States Army Air Forces."

== See also ==
- 5th Air Force
- Edward "Porky" Cragg
- Thomas McGuire
- Richard Bong
