= Richard Southgate (priest) =

English clergyman

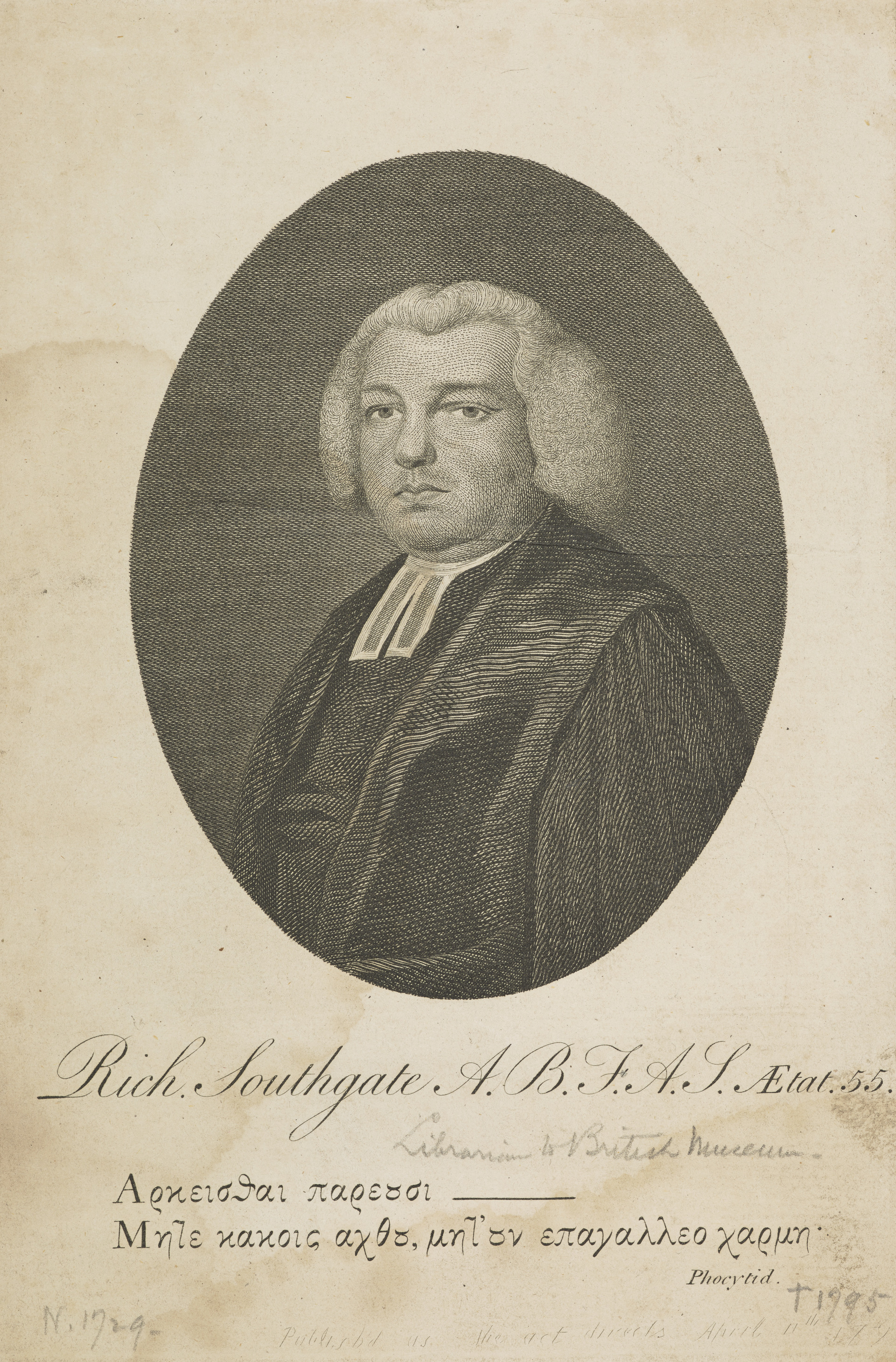
- Born: 1729
- Died: 1795 (aged 65–66)
- Alma mater: St John's College
- Occupation: Cleric, numismatist, librarian

Richard Southgate (1729–1795) was an English clergyman and numismatist.

== Life ==
Born at Alwalton, Huntingdonshire, a few miles from Peterborough, on 16 March 1729, he was the eldest of ten children of William Southgate (d. February 1771), a farmer of the parish, who married Hannah (d. 1772), daughter of Robert Wright of Castor, Northamptonshire, a surveyor and civil engineer. He was educated at private schools at Uppingham and Fotheringay and at the Peterborough grammar school. With an exhibition from the school he went to St John's College, Cambridge, in 1745, and graduated B.A. in the Easter term of 1749.

Southgate took holy orders in 1752, and, after serving the curacy of Weston, Lincolnshire, held the rectory of Woolley, Huntingdonshire from 8 November 1754 till 1759. From 1759 to 1763 he served numerous curacies in Lincolnshire, but on 9 January 1763, for the sake of literary society, he accepted the curacy of St James's, Westminster, which he retained until the end of 1765. On Christmas Day 1765 he accepted the same post at St Giles-in-the-Fields, London, and held it for the rest of his life.

On settling in London Southgate took pupils in classics, and collected books, coins, and medals. Later in life his means increased. He obtained in May 1783 the small rectory of Little Steeping in Lincolnshire, and in May 1790 was instituted to the more valuable rectory of Warsop in Nottinghamshire. On 3 November 1784 he was appointed assistant librarian (with a residence) at the British Museum. Southgate became a member of the Spalding Society on 24 May 1753, and was elected Fellow of the Society of Antiquaries on 6 June 1763.

He died at the British Museum, on 25 January 1795, and was buried in a vault under St Giles's Church on 3 February, a marble tablet being placed to his memory on the south-east pillar in the church. He left no will, and his property was shared by his five surviving brothers.

== Works ==
Southgate was a student of history, the classics, and of French and German literature, and knew some Italian and Spanish. He owned best series of English pennies to be found in the country. He assisted John Pinkerton in his Essay on Medals (1784). Collections were made by him for a ‘History of the Saxons and Danes in England,’ illustrated by coins, but the work was not completed.

Southgate's books and prints were sold by Leigh & Sotheby in 2,599 lots on 27 April 1795 and eleven following days. His coins and medals were announced for sale in eight days, but, according to John Nichols, they passed by private contract to Samuel Tyssen. The shells and natural curiosities were sold on 12 and 13 May 1795. Each catalogue was printed separately, and the whole was bound up, with life prefixed by Charles Combe, as Museum Southgatianum. The frontispiece was a medallion portrait of him at the age of fifty-five. Sermons preached to Parochial Congregations by Southgate were published in 1798 (2 vols.), with a biographical preface by George Gaskin which was mainly borrowed from Combe.
