= Henry Homer the elder =

English clergyman and writer

Henry Homer the elder (1719 – 24 July 1791) was an English clergyman, known as a writer on topics related to economic development.

== Life ==
As the son of Edward Homer of Sutton Coldfield, Warwickshire, Henry Homer studied at Oxford, where he matriculated on 26 June 1736 as a member of the University College. He became a demy of Magdalen College in 1737 and graduated B.A. in 1740, M.A. in 1743.

Homer was appointed rector of Birdingbury, Warwickshire, vicar of Willoughby in 1764, and chaplain to Edward Leigh, 5th Baron Leigh. From 1774 to 1779, he also held the vicarage of Ansty. He died on 24 July 1791 and was buried at Birdingbury.

== Works ==
Homer published:

- An Essay on the Nature and Method of ascertaining the specific Shares of Proprietors upon the Inclosure of Common Fields; with Observations on the Inconveniences of Open Fields, and upon the objections to this Inclosure, particularly as far as they relate to the Public and the Poor, Oxford, 1766.

Homer was a commissioner for enclosures and drew up instructions for the surveyors carrying out the practical work involved. He is considered a significant author on agrarian improvement. As a supporter of enclosure himself, he identified four common objections:

1. depopulation;
2. reduction in corn harvests;
3. loss of rights in cutting turf and furze (turbary); and
4. loss of amenity, for travel and sport.

Homer's Essay was published early in the major controversy over enclosures of 1760 to 1790. During that time, he had a local opponent in Stephen Addington.

- An Enquiry into the means of Preserving and Improving the Publick Roads of this Kingdom. With Observations on the probable consequences of the present plan, Oxford, 1767. He wrote of a recent "revolution" in transportation.

== Family ==
Homer had 17 children, including Arthur Homer, Henry the younger, and Philip Bracebridge Homer.

== Notes ==
Attribution

This article incorporates text from a publication now in the public domain: Lee, Sidney, ed. (1891). "Homer, Henry (1719-1791)". Dictionary of National Biography. Vol. 27. London: Smith, Elder & Co.
