= William Homes Jr. =

American silversmith (1742–1825)

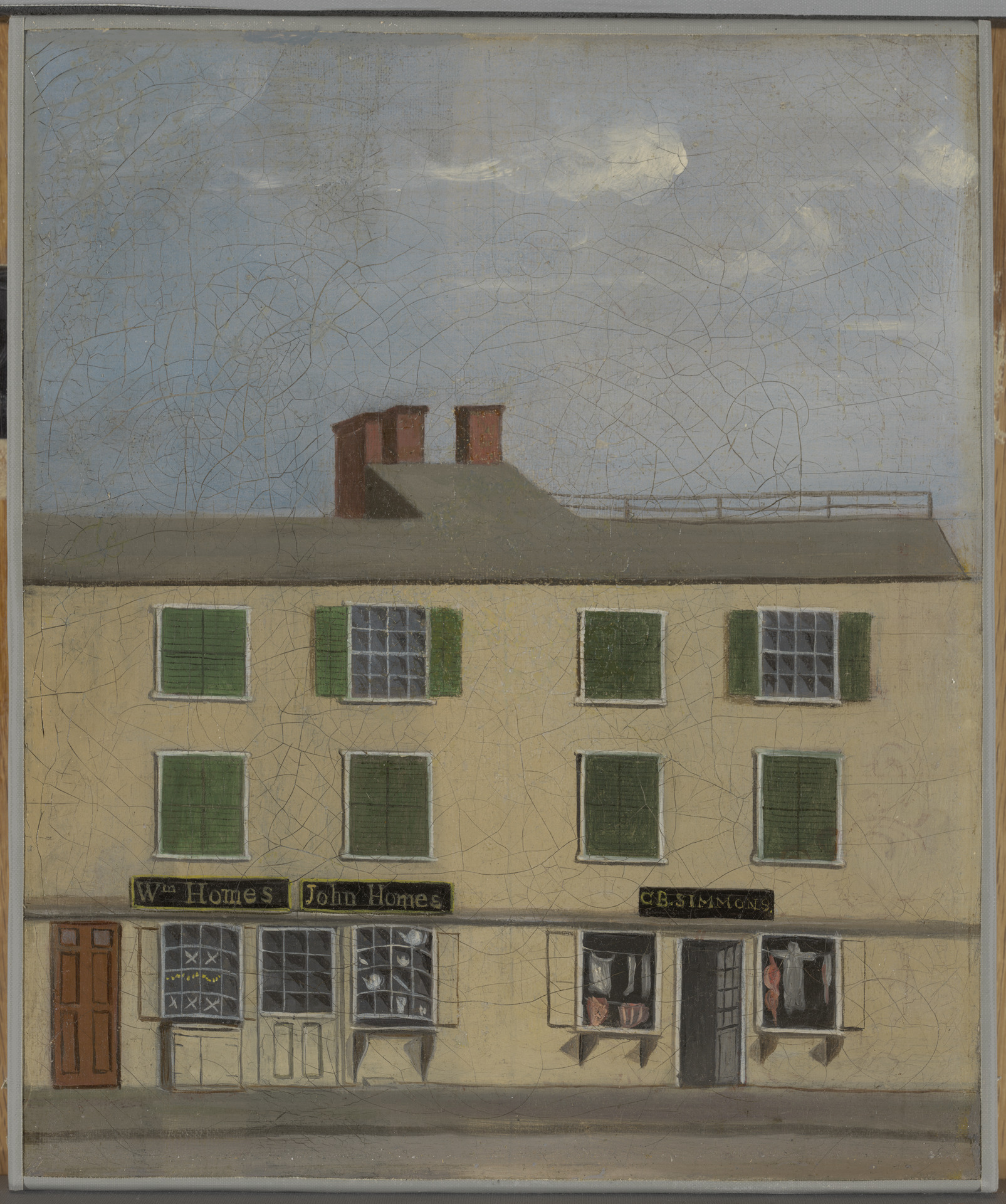
The Silversmith Shop of William Homes, Jr., on Ann Street, between 1816-1825

William Homes Jr. (May 7, 1742 January 13 or February 12, 1825), sometimes spelled William Holmes Jr. , was an American silversmith, active in Boston. He was the son of William Homes.

Homes was born in Boston, and apprenticed about 1755 to his father. He took over his father's shop on Ann Street in April 1763 and worked from 1763 to 1825 as a silversmith. He married Elizabeth Whitwell, and then Mary Greenough on January 14, 1794, in Boston. On September 13, 1784, he advertised in the Boston Gazette to seek an apprentice at his shop opposite the Golden Key in Ann Street. The Boston Directory of 1816 lists William Holmes, goldsmith, and John Holmes, hardware, both at 63 Ann Street, with Cornelius B. Simmons next door.

From 1771 he served as First Sergeant in the Artillery Company and Lieutenant in the militia. In the History of the Military company of the Massachusetts, he is described by contemporary: "a man of small stature, pious, amiable, and much beloved. A few days before his death he was a witness in the Supreme Court, on the trial of the Price will controversy, between Trinity Church and King's Chapel. It was a severe, cold day and Lieut. Homes never went out of his house afterward."

His work is collected in Colonial Williamsburg.
