= Henrietta Maria Benson Homer =

American botanical artist (1809–1884)

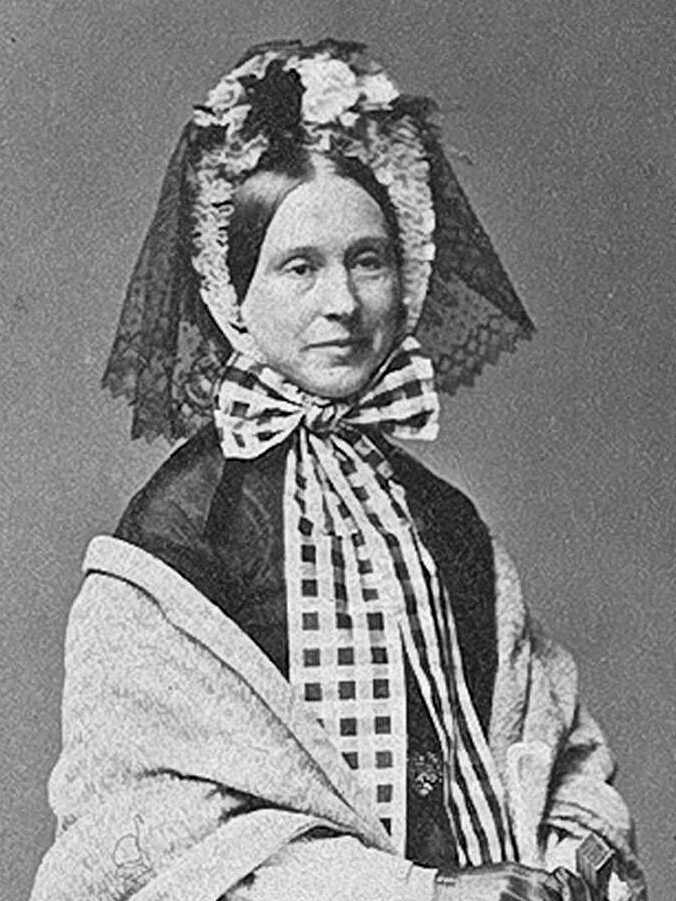
- Born: Henrietta Maria Benson; December 12, 1809; Bucksport, Maine, US
- Died: April 27, 1884 (aged 74); Brooklyn, New York, US
- Resting place: Mount Auburn Cemetery
- Known for: Watercolor painting
- Children: Winslow Homer

Henrietta Maria Benson Homer (December 12, 1809 – April 27, 1884) was an American botanical artist who mainly worked in watercolors and painted studies of nature, especially plants and flowers. She was an important influence on her son, Winslow Homer, who became a preeminent figure in American art.

== Life and career ==
Homer née Benson was born in 1809 in Bucksport, Massachusetts (the town became part of Maine in 1820). She was one of nine children of John Benson and Sarah Buck. On June 6, 1833, she married Charles Savage Homer, a merchant, with whom she had three sons. Their middle son, born in 1836, was the painter Winslow Homer.

Homer created hundreds of botanical watercolors and drawings during her lifetime. She was a member of the American Watercolor Society and exhibited her watercolors at the Brooklyn Art Association starting in 1873. Her work was included in the 1874 and 1876 Brooklyn Art Association exhibitions alongside the works of her son, Winslow, who took up the medium in earnest in 1873 after seeing his mother's success. Bowdoin College Museum of Art and Cooper Hewitt, Smithsonian Design Museum, among other museums, hold her art in their permanent collections. Some of her watercolors were featured at a special exhibition of Winslow's works at the MFA Boston in 2025 and at an exhibition of American watercolorists at the Philadelphia Museum of Art in 2016.

Homer died on April 27, 1884, in Brooklyn, New York. She was buried alongside her son and husband at Mount Auburn Cemetery in Cambridge, Massachusetts.

== Gallery ==
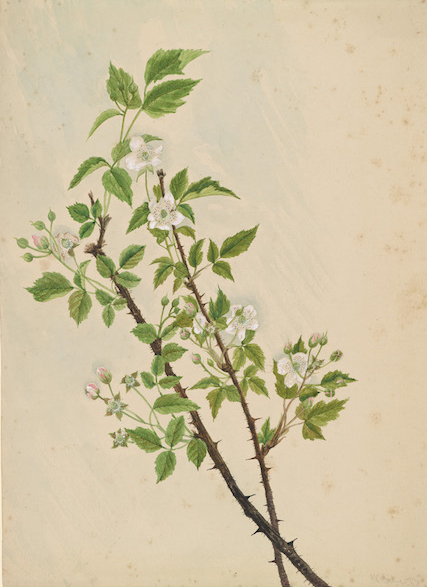
Untitled (Rose Study), 1873

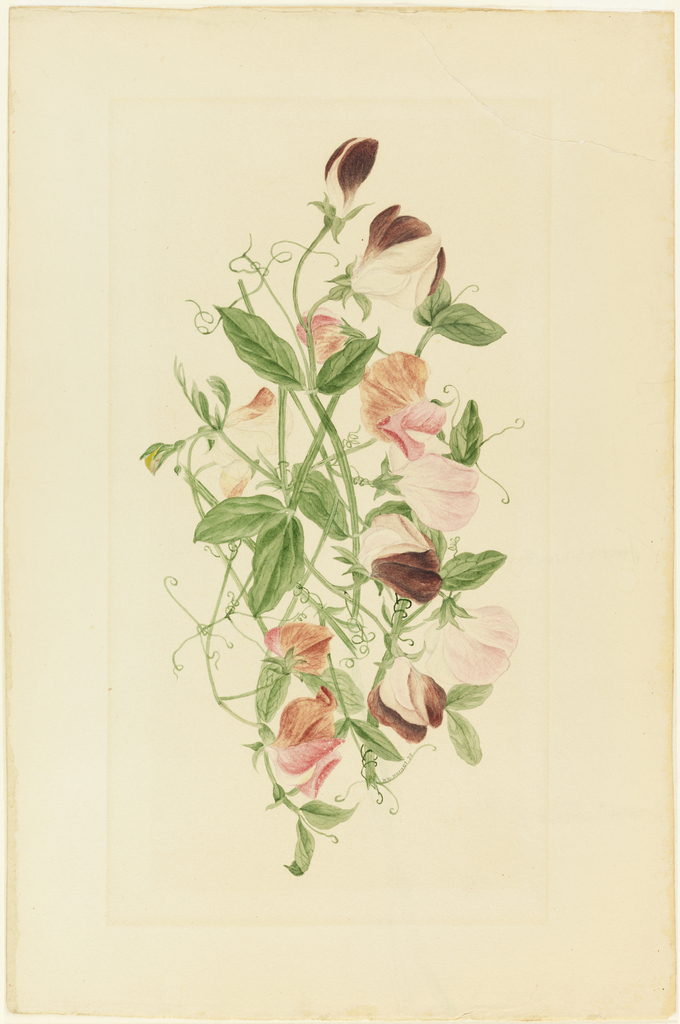
Sweet Peas, 1875
