= Thomas Halliday (engraver) =

English coin and medal engraver

- Born: c. 1780
- Died: c. 1854

Thomas Halliday (c.1780 – c.1854) was an English coin and medal engraver associated with the Royal Birmingham Society of Artists.

Halliday worked as an engraver at the Soho Mint in Handsworth, West Midlands. Following this, he set up his own business moving to numerous locations throughout Birmingham before settling at Newhall Street until his death. He had many apprentices including Peter Wyon, a member of a large family of engravers.

== Engraver of Canadian colonial tokens ==
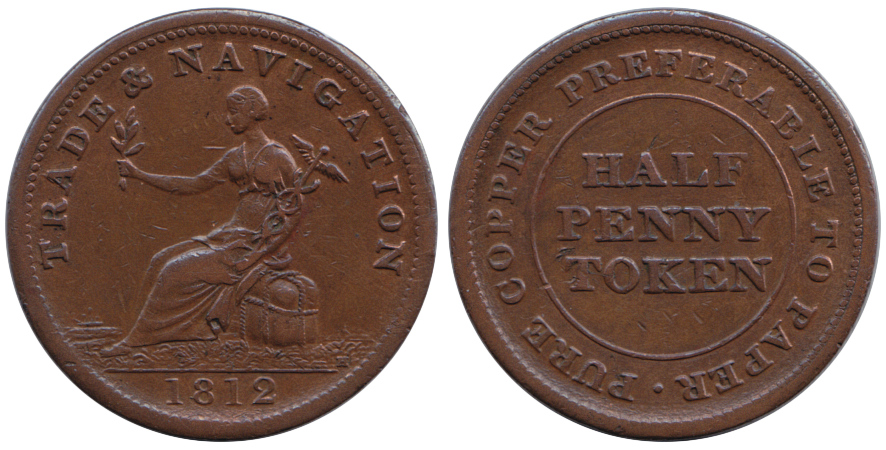
1812 Nova Scotia token. On the obverse the letter "H" is the sign of Thomas Halliday

Halliday is known to have engraved dies for a number of copper tokens that were used in pre-Confederation Canada. These include the Bust and Commerce series, the Pure Copper Preferable to Paper series, and the “R.H. tokens” among others.
