= Young Head coinage =

Mid-19th century British coins

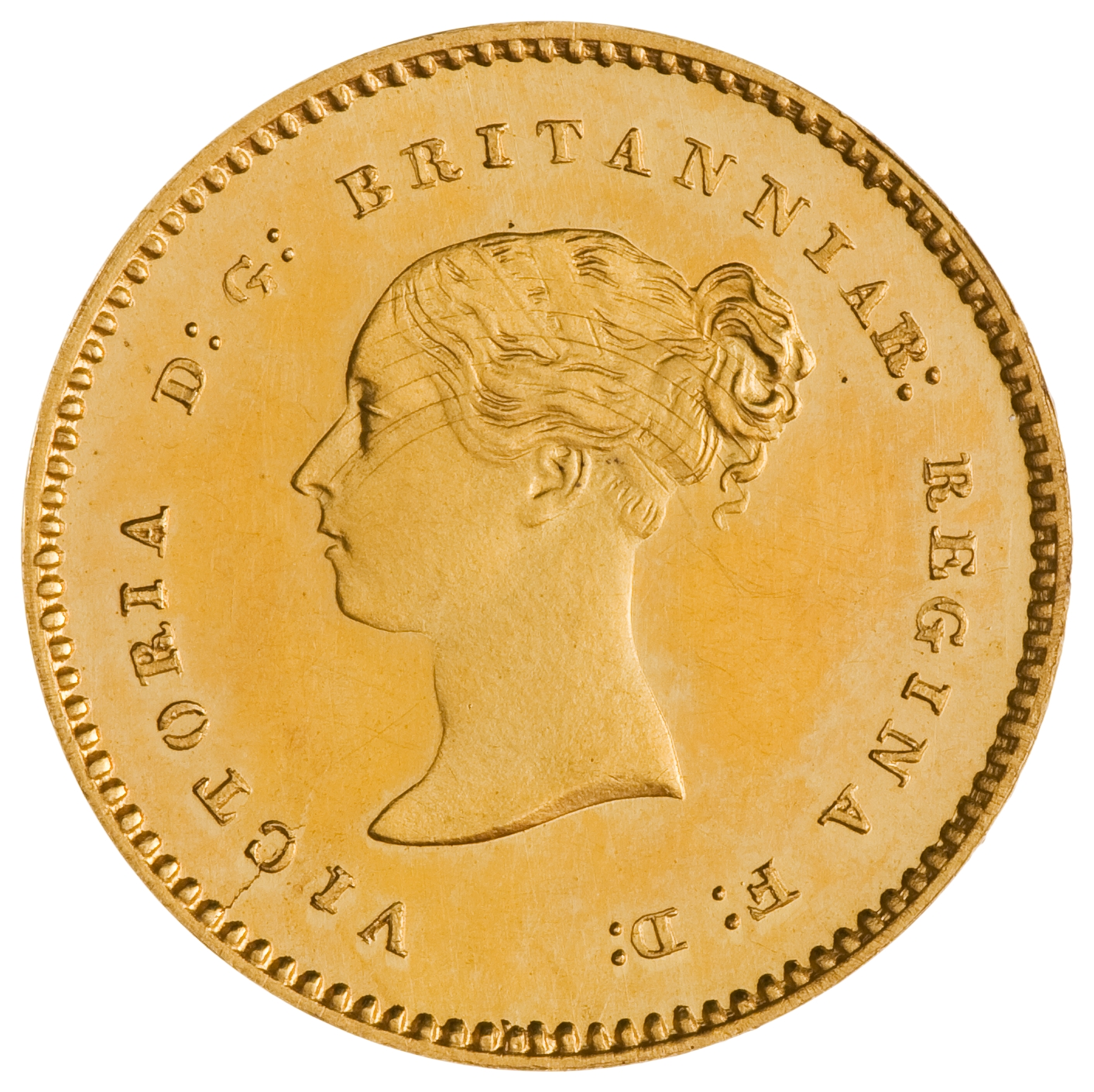
Wyon's portrait on the never-issued Victorian quarter sovereign, 1853

The Young Head coinage consists of the issues of British coins with an obverse bust of Queen Victoria first used in 1838 while Victoria was still a teenager. Designed by William Wyon, the bust remained on some denominations of British coins until 1887, by which time she was almost 70 years of age and had ceased to resemble her depiction. Wyon's bust of Victoria also appeared on coinage for British dependencies.

The young queen sat for Wyon multiple times in August and September 1837. Wyon then created his coinage portrait of her, which was approved in February 1838. Minting with the portrait began later that year; some of the new issues had reverses by Wyon, others by Jean Baptiste Merlen. The new issue produced generally favourable reactions, especially the Una and the Lion reverse used for the five-pound piece.

The Wyon portrait of Victoria proved to be a favourite of hers, and because of that continued on the coinage even after she no longer resembled it. It was replaced on the penny and its fractions when the copper coinage was replaced with bronze in the 1860s, but continued on some of the gold and silver coinage. It was finally superseded by the Jubilee coinage in 1887. Wyon's portrait was imitated or reproduced from the time of its issue, and both the portrait and the Una reverse appeared on British commemorative coins in 2019.

== Background and preparation ==
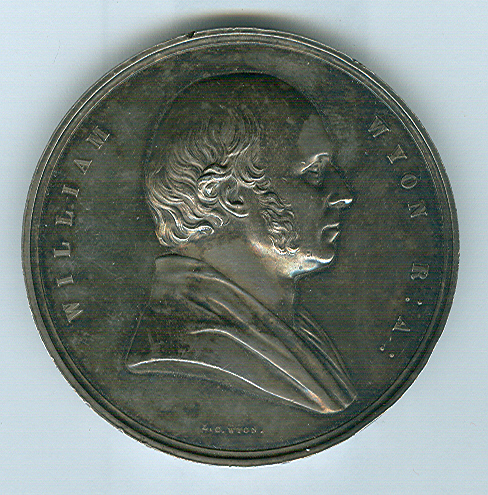
William Wyon on a posthumous medal by his son, Leonard Charles Wyon, 1854

King William IV died on 20 June 1837; his niece, Victoria, was his successor. This change meant that a new coinage would be prepared. At this time, the Royal Mint's chief engraver, William Wyon, focused on the side of the coin bearing the monarch's portrait, the obverse, and the second engraver worked on the other side, the reverse.

Wyon had been chief engraver of the Royal Mint since 1828. Then, a battle with Benedetto Pistrucci over the position had been settled by making Wyon chief engraver and Pistrucci chief medallist, at equal salaries. Jean Baptiste Merlen (also known as Johann Baptist Merlen) was of Flemish origin, and had been working on official medals in Paris under the French First Empire. He emigrated to Britain and was hired by the Royal Mint, apparently at Pistrucci's recommendation. His formal position was as a temporary extra engraver, for he was, like Pistrucci, a foreigner ineligible by statute for the permanent salaried posts at the Royal Mint. Merlen in practice acted as second engraver, and that position was held vacant until after his retirement in 1844.

Victoria sat for Wyon at Windsor Castle on 25 August 1837, two months after she became queen, then again the following day and again two days after that. Victoria sat again for him on 15 and 16 September, enabling him to complete the coinage portrait, which is similar to the medal he had prepared to commemorate her accession. Pistrucci was also granted sittings; Wyon was to design the coinage and Pistrucci the coronation medal. There was still a bitter rivalry between the two at the Royal Mint, and each had his partisans; the coinage redesign took place amid a battle between the two camps in the newspapers.

Designs for the new coinage, together with an example of the sovereign were submitted to Victoria by the Master of the Mint, Henry Labouchere, on 15 February 1838, with the required designs having been described by an order in council dated 26 July 1837. They were approved on 26 February 1838.

The new coinage was subject to several delays. A Wyon supporter (likely Nicholas Carlisle) accused Pistrucci of ordering Royal Mint employees to work on the coronation medal who should have been helping to prepare the new coinage. Merlen, who engraved the reverses of the precious metal coins (the coppers were engraved by Wyon), was slow to complete his work, and did not complete the work until 1839. Then, the Royal Mint suffered difficulties with production, with coinage dies breaking before they struck an adequate number of coins, causing Wyon to visit the Monnaie de Paris at his own expense to see if the French could be of help. He found them hospitable (the Royal Mint had granted wide access to a party of French officials some years previously), and he was given an audience with King Louis Philippe. The visit does not seem to have solved the problems.

Wyon was able to utilise the same portrait of Victoria for all denominations by use of a reducing machine, which the Royal Mint had purchased in 1824, a duplicate of one Pistrucci had obtained for himself.

== Designs ==
=== Obverse ===
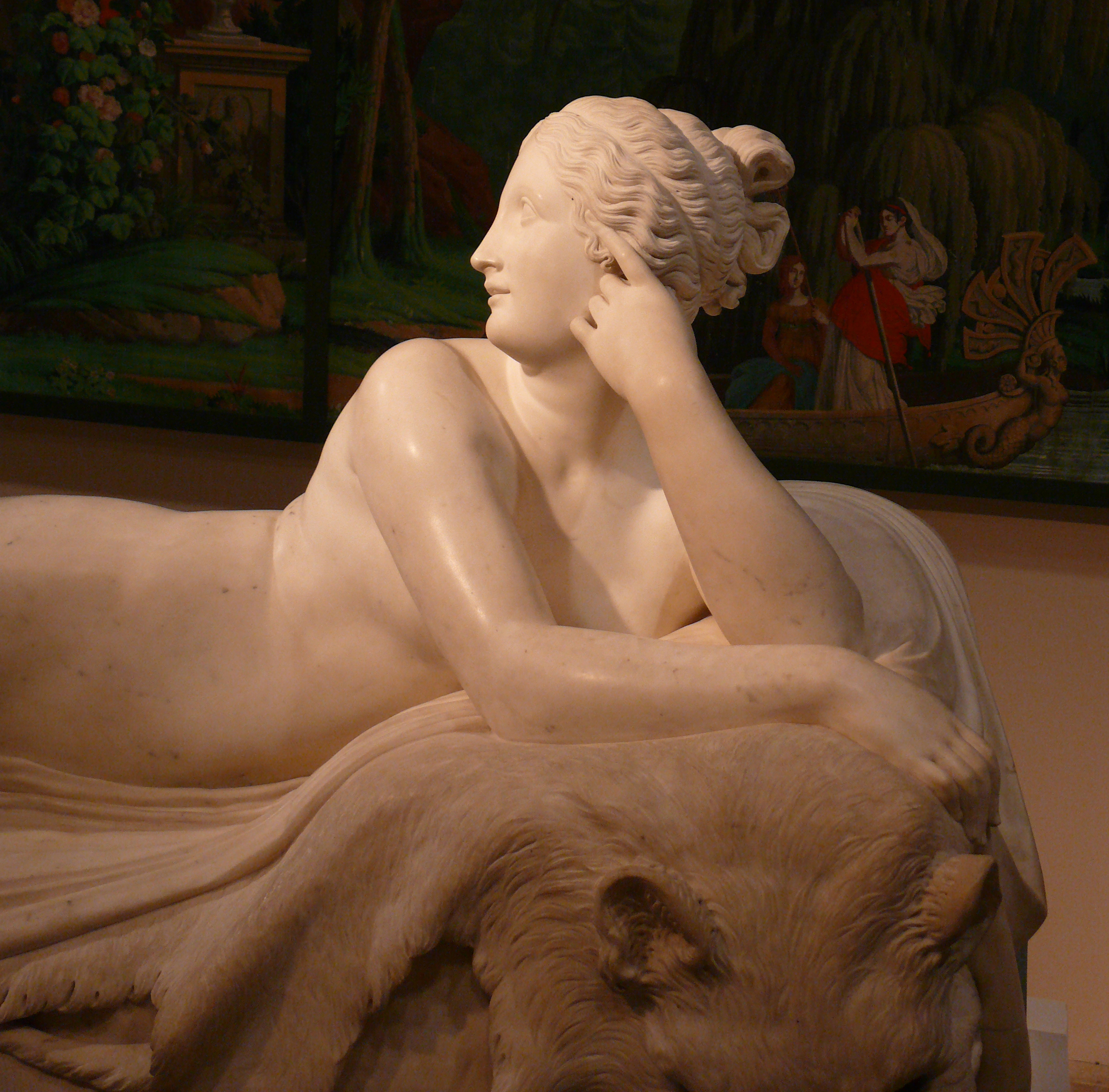
This Antonio Canova sculpture is a variation on the Fountain Nymph.

The Young Head coinage bears a portrait of Victoria facing left, her hair bound by a double fillet and tied in a knot, from which a loose curl escapes. The coin design is a development of the medals Wyon had prepared for Victoria's accession and for the visit of Prince Henry of the Netherlands to the Royal Mint, all look back to Antonio Canova's sculpture Fountain Nymph. The numismatist Lawrence W. Cobb described it as a "classic portrait of Victoria ... the head of a lovely young girl ... the celebrated 'Young Head' design, which was destined to grace British and Empire coinage for decades and would inspire many imitations, both good and bad." Cobb cited the description of the issue by Stack's auction house, that Wyon had managed to "catch her spontaneous youthful charm and at the same time create an excellent likeness". According to the Royal Mint Museum, of Wyon's portraits of Victoria, that "approved for the coinage in 1838 undoubtedly takes pride of place. Wyon was clearly inspired by his admiration of the neo-classical style of his mentor John Flaxman to create an uncluttered and well-balanced portrait."

Kevin Clancy, in his volume on the history of the sovereign coin, stated that Wyon's "portrait transformed a monarch, not known for her beauty, into an attractive young woman. It is hardly surprising he became a favourite, and that his Young Head portrait was retained until Victoria was in her late 60s." According to André Celtel and Svein H. Gullbekk, in their own volume on the sovereign, "the beautiful features of this simple and uncluttered portrait flatter the queen, who was a grandmother in her late sixties before she allowed it to disappear from the coinage." Wyon's initials appear on the truncation of the bust on coins larger than the sixpence.

=== Reverses ===
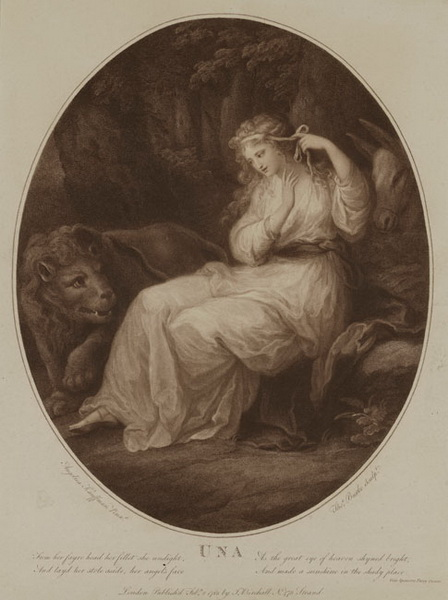
Engraving of Una and the Lion by Thomas Burke

The only five-pound piece of the Young Head series was dated 1839. The numismatist Richard Lobel calls it one of the most famous and attractive of all British coins. This piece, known as the Una and the Lion coin, is described by him as having "cult status". The numismatic author Peter Seaby deemed it "this famous coin designed by William Wyon". According to the numismatic writer Graham Bennett, it is Wyon's masterpiece. The Royal Mint's website characterises it, "The gold five-pound piece of 1839, though not as spectacularly rare as the Edward VIII pattern coins, is arguably one of the most beautiful coins in the world."

The symbolism on the coinage had been adapted to male monarchs, and something was needed to replace Pistrucci's Saint George and the Dragon reverse for the five-pound coin. Wyon's Una and the Lion coin was the result. Una and the Lion appear in Edmund Spenser's 16th-century epic The Faerie Queene. The obverse contains the Young Head of the Queen, facing left, while the reverse shows her as Una leading the lion to the left. A specimen in exceptional condition sold in 2021 for US$1.44 million (£1.04 million).

The other gold coins struck with the Young Head are the sovereign and half sovereign; both initially depicted the royal arms on the reverse. The royal arms as shown on the coinage represent a change from earlier reigns as they omit the arms of Hanover—under Salic law, women could not inherit that throne, and thus on King William's death, Ernest Augustus, Duke of Cumberland, Victoria's uncle, became King of Hanover. On the sovereign, the arms are surrounded by a laurel wreath; beneath it, a shamrock and a thistle are threaded through a rose, symbolic of Ireland, Scotland and England. On the half sovereign, the wreath and floral emblems are replaced by ornate garnishing.

The other denominations bearing a wreathed shield were the crown and the half crown. The shilling and sixpence bore statements of its denomination, a continuation of the designs, by Merlen, used under William IV. These had been the first English or British coins to state their denomination on the reverse. The fourpence also continued its design, by Wyon, featuring Britannia that it had borne since its introduction in 1836. It was discontinued for circulation in 1855, recognising the rise of the silver threepence, bearing the same design as the Maundy threepence. The currency threepence was struck with Wyon's bust of Victoria from 1838 for colonial use, and beginning in 1845 for use in the United Kingdom.

The penny, halfpenny, farthing and third farthing were given a depiction of Britannia, by Wyon, like the one those coins bore under King William, and near-identical to the one introduced in the mid-1820s under William's brother and predecessor, George IV. One detail that was translated to some of Merlen's designs from Wyon's copper coinage was the intertwined rose, shamrock and thistle; it had appeared on Wyon's copper coinage for King George.

Of the small coins meant for colonial use, the three halfpence, a small silver coin with a reverse by Merlen, was intended for use in Ceylon and the West Indies; its resemblance to British coinage has caused it to be catalogued amongst British coins. The half farthing had been struck under King George and King William with a similar reverse to the larger coppers. With the fourpence, identical in size to the half farthing, now circulating, the half farthing was given a reverse design, by Wyon, which explicitly stated its value, lest the half farthing be plated with silver and pass for fourpence. The 1839 issue shows only a rose below the denomination; when it gained legal tender status in Britain in 1842, Wyon changed that for the intertwined flowers found on the larger coppers. The quarter farthing was not made legal tender in Britain, being too small to have any real purchasing power there, and bore a design similar to Wyon's 1839 half farthing.

== Release and reaction ==
The first Young Head coins to be released were dated 1838, with sovereigns, half sovereigns, half crowns, shillings, sixpences, pennies, halfpennies and Maundy money. The shilling was first available on 11 August 1838 in limited quantities, with greater supplies expected soon, and was said by one newspaper to bear "an exceedingly handsome profile of her Majesty, by Wyon". Nevertheless, it was not until January and February 1841 that the coppers entered circulation in any quantity; not much precious metal coinage was struck until the middle of the following year. When the coppers were made available, a correspondent for The Athenaeum wrote of the pennies that they

display the same grace and skill in execution which characterize [Wyon's] productions. Here, however, all commendation must cease. In all other respects, I can only speak of this coin in terms of disapprobation. First, as to the quality of the metal: it is so ill-prepared, that upon very many of the pieces the surface has broken up in flakes. Secondly, as to the striking: I have not seen a single piece which is what is technically called well struck up ...

The Kendal Mercury, though, stated on 23 January 1841, "a beautiful specimen of new coins has been issued from the Mint, consisting of penny pieces ... on one side is a most excellent medallion likeness of her present Majesty, richly and elaborately finished ... the finish of the coins produced ... cannot be excelled in the most valuable materials." The Scotsman called the penny "very handsome" and Wyon's portrait "beautifully executed". However, not everyone considered the portrait to be successful, and The Times thought it inaccurate.

The Art Journal stated that the Una and the Lion coin "for chastity of design and beauty of execution, far exceeds anything that has hitherto issued from Her Majesty's Mint". Berrow's Worcester Journal deemed it "the most perfect of coins". The Manchester Guardian wrote that it, "for beauty of execution, excels any thing yet issued from the mint".

== Production ==
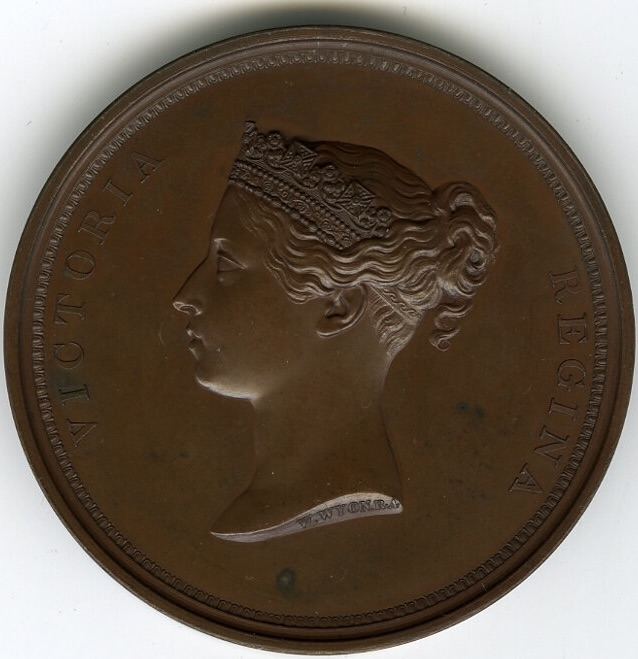
Obverse of Wyon's medal for Victoria's visit to the City of London, 1837

The Una and the Lion five-pound coins did not circulate, were struck only on demand and were sold by the Royal Mint until 1886; there are a number of varieties and a total mintage of perhaps 400. No double sovereign was issued with the Young Head obverse. The sovereign and half sovereign though, were issued almost every year from 1838 to 1887 bearing the Young Head, over a third of a century after Wyon's death in 1851. The crown was struck with the Young Head only in 1839, 1844, 1845 and 1847, in small numbers and not for the general public. According to a Wyon obituarist, the Company of Moneyers, who then farmed the Royal Mint, refused a general issue that would require extra care lest their profits be diminished.

The shield motif was used on the half sovereign throughout the Young Head's time, and on the sovereign until 1874—Pistrucci's Saint George and the Dragon reverse was reintroduced in 1871 by the new deputy Master of the Royal Mint, Charles William Fremantle, who disliked the shield reverse. Pistrucci's reverse was used for all Young Head sovereigns after 1874, except those struck at the Australian mints, where both types were struck until 1887. Many of the shield-back coins were sent to India, where they may have been preferred to the ones with Pistrucci's reverse.

The florin, introduced in 1849, never bore the Young Head, instead depicting a Gothic-style bust of Victoria designed by Wyon. After the issuance of the florin, the half crown, to which it was close in size and value, was not coined for a quarter-century to give the new coin a fair start. In 1874, enquiries through the banks showed that each coin had strong partisans, and striking of the half crown was resumed.

Besides the threepence, other coins struck for colonial use that bear the Young Head bust of Victoria include the silver twopence, struck mainly for use in British Guiana in 1838, 1843 and 1848. The three halfpence was struck with the Young Head between 1838 and 1870. The half farthing had been first struck in 1828 and was intended for Ceylon, but was made current in Britain in 1842, despite comments that very little could be bought with one. It never came into general circulation in Britain and was discontinued after 1856, though ones dated 1868 are known, possibly in preparation for a proposed issue for Jamaica. The third farthing, intended for Malta, was issued with the Young Head only in 1844; by the time it was issued again in 1866, it was with a head of Victoria designed by Wyon's son, Leonard Charles Wyon. The quarter farthing, intended for Ceylon (where it had more purchasing power) was struck in 1839, 1851, 1852, 1853 and 1868, the last possibly preparation for an issue for Jamaica.

== End of series ==
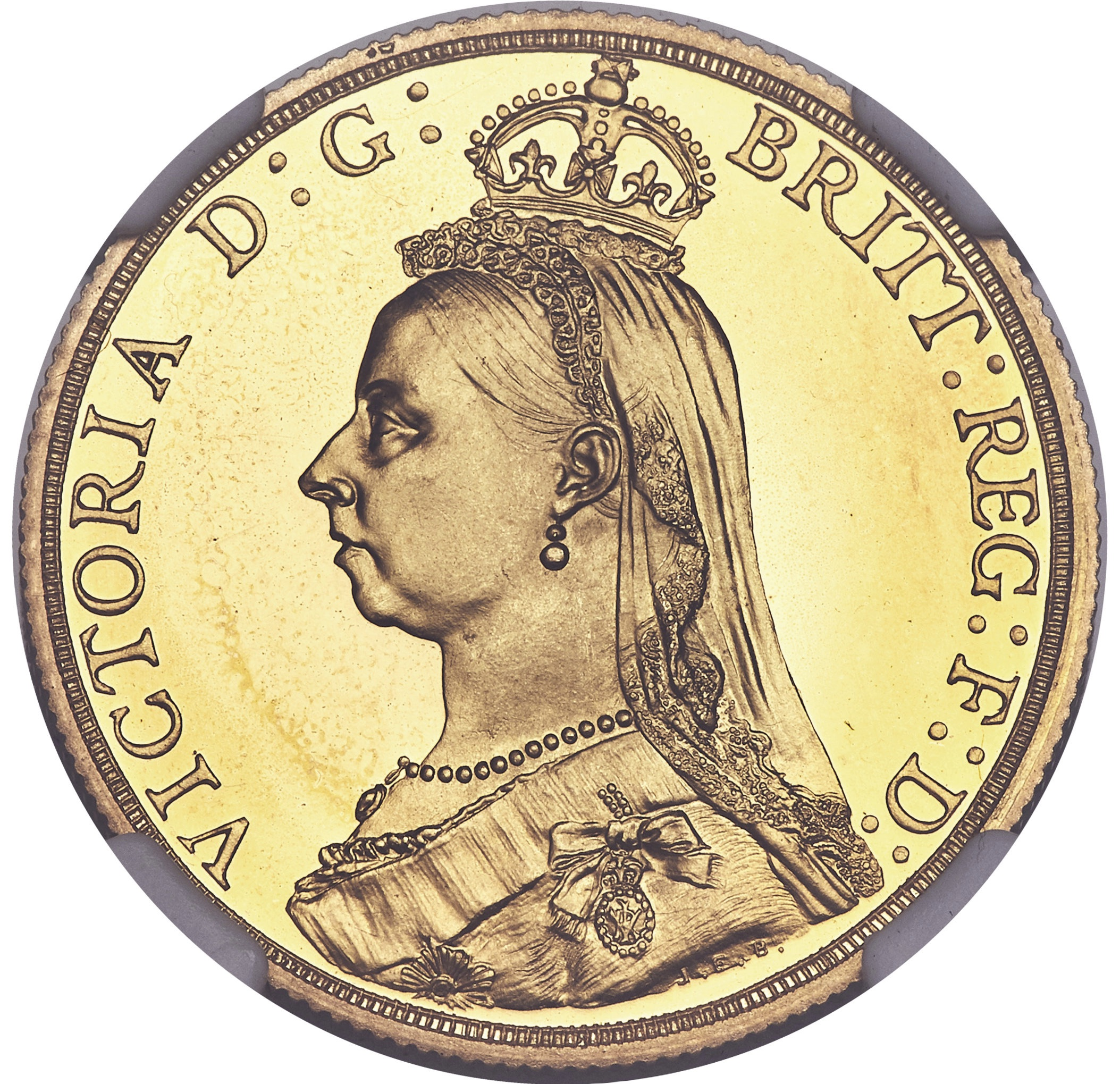
The Jubilee coinage ended the Young Head coinage (obverse of double sovereign shown).

Beginning in 1860, the old copper coinage was replaced by bronze pieces. The new coins bore a bust of Victoria by Leonard Charles Wyon (known as the Bun penny). The old pennies, halfpennies, farthings and half farthings were demonetised at the end of 1869.

By the 1880s, the sovereign, half sovereign, half crown, shilling, sixpence, threepence and Maundy coinage were still struck with the Young Head, though minor changes to it had been made over time. It remained on the coinage because Victoria liked it; the queen was past 60 and no longer resembled her numismatic depiction. In February 1879, the private secretary to the queen, Sir Henry Ponsonby, informed Fremantle that Joseph Edgar Boehm had been engaged to produce a medallic likeness of the queen that could be adapted for coinage purposes. Progress was slow as Boehm was busy with other commissions. It was not until March 1887 that the Chancellor of the Exchequer, George Goschen, approved the coins, dies for which were prepared from Boehm's models by Leonard Charles Wyon. They were released on 20 June 1887, Victoria's 50th anniversary on the throne. The Jubilee coinage was attacked as inartistic and for the small crown they depicted Victoria wearing, In September 1889, Victoria wrote, "the Queen dislikes the new coinage very much, and wishes the old one could still be used and the new one gradually disused, and then a new one struck". The Jubilee coins were replaced by the Old Head coinage beginning in 1893.

== Reproductions, imitations and later versions ==
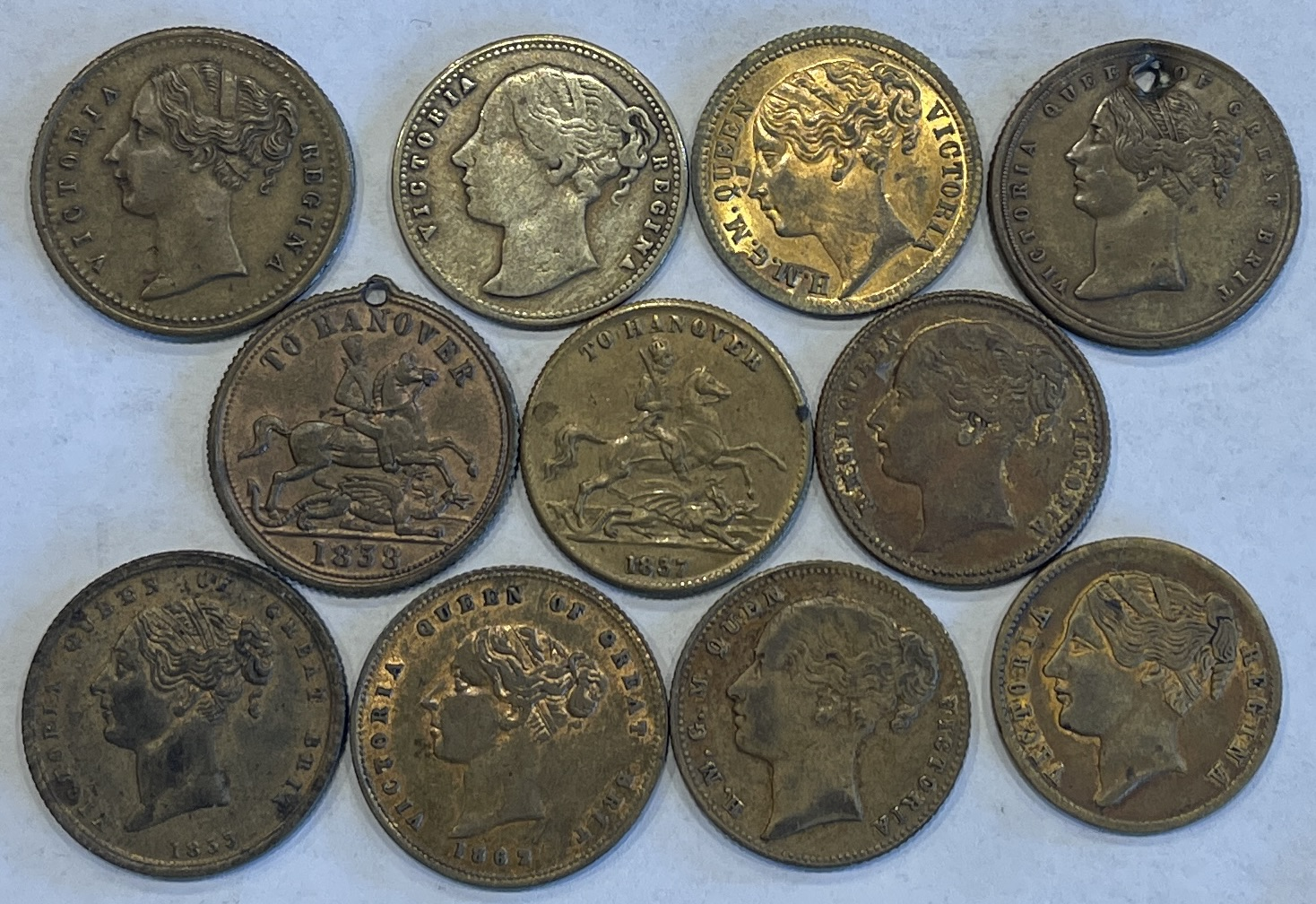
A grouping of "Cumberland Jack" whist counters using imitations of the Young Head

Imitations of the Young Head design were circulated as early as 1840, with currency tokens for Nova Scotia. A somewhat distorted version in low relief was issued for India in 1841 and 1842; Wyon was called upon to make revisions of them in 1849, and the new issues of coins bore the same dates as the old. The obverse dies for the farthing, halfpenny and penny were used to make coins for the Isle of Man, with a reverse design for the island by Merlen, and the half farthing, farthing and halfpenny obverses were placed on coinage for Gibraltar in 1842. The penny and halfpenny issued by the colony of New Brunswick in 1854 feature the Young Head on one side, transferred from the British halfpenny and shilling respectively by Wyon's son Leonard. The original Australian sovereign, issued in 1854 and 1855, bears a portrait very close to the Young Head, engraved by Wyon's relative James Wyon. Another depiction by William Wyon of the youthful Victoria, but wearing a diadem, was first used on the 1837 medal marking the Queen's visit to the London Guildhall, but was reused on many coins and medals. It was also the basis for the Penny Black, the first adhesive postage stamp.

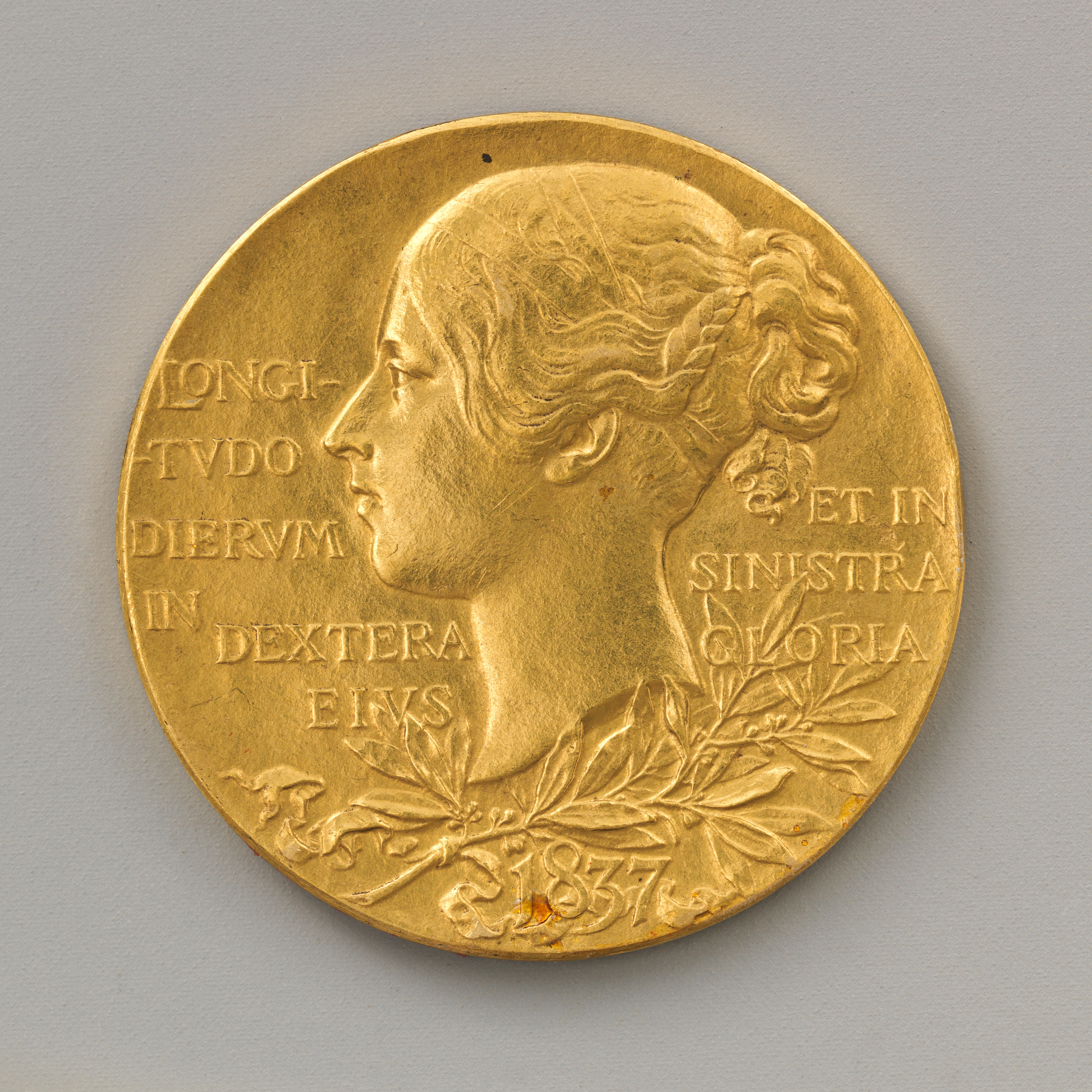
Brock's medal for the Diamond Jubilee

Imitations of the Young Head design appeared on private issues of tokens as well, such as the so-called "To Hanover" or "Cumberland Jack" tokens, which on the other side bore an image representing the unpopular King Ernest skulking off to his Hanoverian domains. These remained popular as gaming tokens long after they were no longer topical, and were sometimes passed as sovereigns. The Counterfeit Medal Act 1883 made them illegal.

In 1897 when Thomas Brock was preparing the medal for Queen Victoria's diamond jubilee, he used Wyon's Young Head on one side of the medal with his own Veiled Head of Victoria on the other. The medal was engraved by George William de Saulles.

In 2019 the Royal Mint issued a five-pound piece commemorating the bicentennial of Victoria's birth that included an interpretation of Wyon's Young Head portrait. The same year, the Royal Mint began a Great Engravers series, reproducing classic designs. First in the series was the Una and the Lion reverse, with an obverse by Jody Clark of Queen Elizabeth II. The coin was issued both in silver and in gold, in denominations as high as £5,000, with that piece containing five kilograms of fine gold. Although more of the smaller denominations were sold, only one of the £5,000 piece was sold. The Una and the Lion design has also been reproduced on coins of Gibraltar, Alderney and Saint Helena.

== The Young Head coinage ==
List of Young Head coins
Denomination	Obverse	Reverse	Reverse designer and date of design if earlier	Years struck with Young Head obverse
Five-pound piece	Gold coin with a woman's head facing left	Gold coin with a woman leading a lion	William Wyon	1839
Sovereign (shield design)	Gold coin with a woman's head facing left	Gold coin with a coat of arms	Jean Baptiste Merlen	1838–1887; reverse most recently used in 2025
Sovereign (George and Dragon)	Gold coin with a woman's head facing left	Gold coin with a man fighting a dragon	Benedetto Pistrucci (1817; major modification in 1821)	1871–1887; reverse most recently used in 2026
Half sovereign	Gold coin with a woman's head facing left	Gold coin with a coat of arms	Jean Baptiste Merlen	1838–1887
Crown	Silver coin with a woman's head facing left	Silver coin with a coat of arms	Jean Baptiste Merlen	1839, 1844, 1845, 1847, 1879
Half crown	Silver coin with a woman's head facing left	Silver coin with a coat of arms	Jean Baptiste Merlen	1839–1887
Shilling	Silver coin with a woman's head facing left	Silver coin with its value in a wreath	Jean Baptiste Merlen (1831)	1838–1887
Sixpence	Silver coin with a woman's head facing left	Silver coin with its value in a wreath	Jean Baptiste Merlen (1831)	1838–1887; last used in 1910
Fourpence (groat)	Silver coin with a woman's head facing left	Silver coin with a rendering of Britannia	William Wyon (1836)	1838–1862; last used in 1888
Threepence	Silver coin with a woman's head facing left	Silver coin with a number in a wreath	Jean Baptiste Merlen (1822)	1838–1887; reverse last used in 1926
Twopence	Silver coin with a woman's head facing left	Silver coin with a number in a wreath	Jean Baptiste Merlen (1822)	1838–1848
Maundy coinage	Silver coins with a woman's head facing left	Silver coins with a number in a wreath	Jean Baptiste Merlen (1822)	1838–1887; reverse last used in 2025
Three halfpence	Silver coin with a woman's head facing left	Silver coin with a number in a wreath	Jean Baptiste Merlen (1834)	1838–1870
Penny	Copper coin with a woman's head facing left	Copper coin with a rendering of Britannia	William Wyon (1825)	1839–1860
Halfpenny	Copper coin with a woman's head facing left	Copper coin with a rendering of Britannia	William Wyon (1825)	1838–1860
Farthing	Copper coin with a woman's head facing left	Copper coin with a rendering of Britannia	William Wyon (1826)	1838–1860
Half farthing (1839 version)	Copper coin with a woman's head facing left	Copper coin with its value in words and date of striking	William Wyon	1839
Half farthing (second version)	Copper coin with a woman's head facing left	Copper coin with its value in words and date of striking	William Wyon	1842–1868
Third farthing	Copper coin with a woman's head facing left	Copper coin with a rendering of Britannia	William Wyon (1827)	1844
Quarter farthing	Copper coin with a woman's head facing left	Copper coin with its value in words and date of striking	William Wyon	1839–1868

== Sources ==
- Bair, Bob (April 2023). "William Wyon's Una and the Lion". The Numismatist. 136 (4): 46–50.
- Bennett, Graham (October 2013). "William Wyon—Master Engraver". Coin News. 53 (10): 47–48. ISSN 0958-1391.
- Bull, Maurice (2015) [1949]. English Silver Coinage since 1649 (6th ed.). Spink & Son. ISBN 978-1-907427-50-3.
- Celtel, André & Gullbekk, Svein H. (2006). The Sovereign and its Golden Antecedents. Monetarius. ISBN 978-82-996755-6-7.
- Clancy, Kevin (2017) [2015]. A History of the Sovereign: Chief Coin of the World (2nd ed.). Royal Mint Museum. ISBN 978-1-869917-00-5.
- Cobb, Lawrence W. (March 1984). "The Queen and William Wyon". The Numismatist. 97 (3): 493–499.
- Craig, John (2010) [1953]. The Mint: A History of the London Mint from A.D. 287 to 1948 (paperback ed.). Cambridge University Press. ISBN 978-0-521-17077-2.
- Dyer, Graham P. & Gaspar, Peter P. (1992). "Reform, the New Technology and Tower Hill". In Challis, Christopher Edgar Challis (ed.). A New History of the Royal Mint. Cambridge University Press. pp. 398–606. ISBN 978-0-521-24026-0.
- Dyer, Graham P. & Stocker, Mark (1984). "Edgar Boehm and the Jubilee Coinage" (PDF). British Numismatic Journal. sixth. 54: 274–288.
- Forrer, Leonard (1909). Biographical Dictionary of Medallists. Vol. IV. Spink & Son. OCLC 312571442.
- Hawkins, Roy Neville Playfair (1959). "'To Hanover' Counters". The Numismatic Chronicle and Journal of the Royal Numismatic Society. 19: 203–230. JSTOR 42662376.
- Jones, Mark (2025). William Wyon. Spink & Son. ISBN 978-1-912667-79-6.
- Kappen, Charles V. (May 1950). "English Regal Copper Coinage". The Numismatist. 63 (5): 263–270.
- Lant, Jeffrey L. (1973). "The Jubilee Coinage of 1887" (PDF). British Numismatic Journal. 43: 132–141.
- Lobel, Richard, ed. (1999) [1995]. Coincraft's Standard Catalogue English & UK Coins 1066 to Date (5th ed.). Standard Catalogue Publishers. ISBN 978-0-9526228-8-8.
- Marsh, Michael A. (2017) [1980]. The Gold Sovereign (revised ed.). Token Publishing. ISBN 978-1-908828-36-1.
- Peck, C. Wilson (1960). English Copper, Tin and Bronze Coins in the British Museum 1558–1958. Trustees of the British Museum. OCLC 906173180. SBN 7141-0813-8.
- Seaby, Peter (1985). The Story of British Coinage. B. A. Seaby. ISBN 0-900652-74-8.
- Spink & Son (2022). Coins of England and the United Kingdom, Predecimal Issues 2023 (58th ed.). Spink & Son. ISBN 978-1-912667-91-8.
- Spink & Son (2022). Coins of England and the United Kingdom, Decimal Issues 2023 (9th ed.). Spink & Son. ISBN 978-1-912667-93-2.
