= 1860s replacement of the British copper coinage =

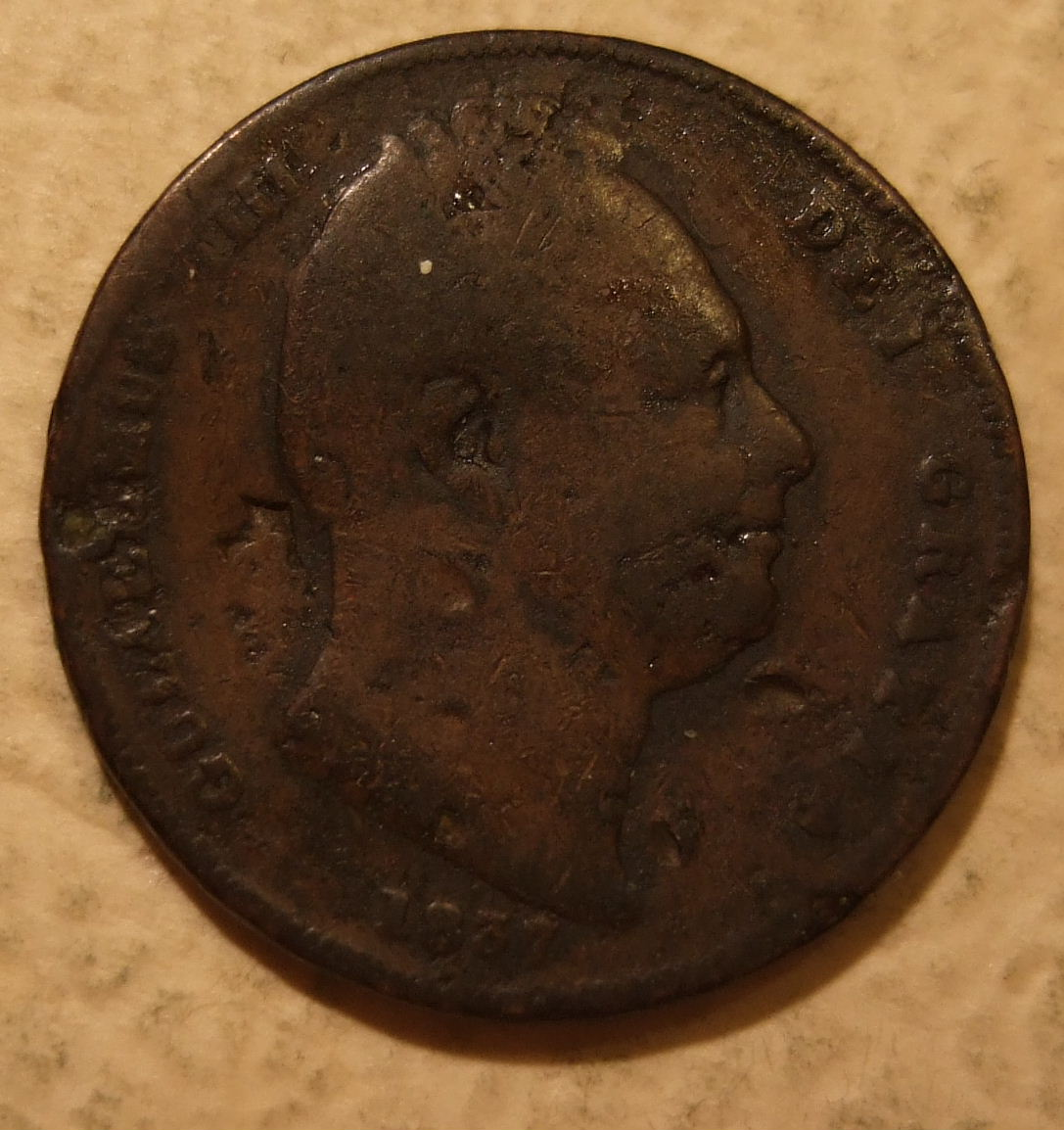
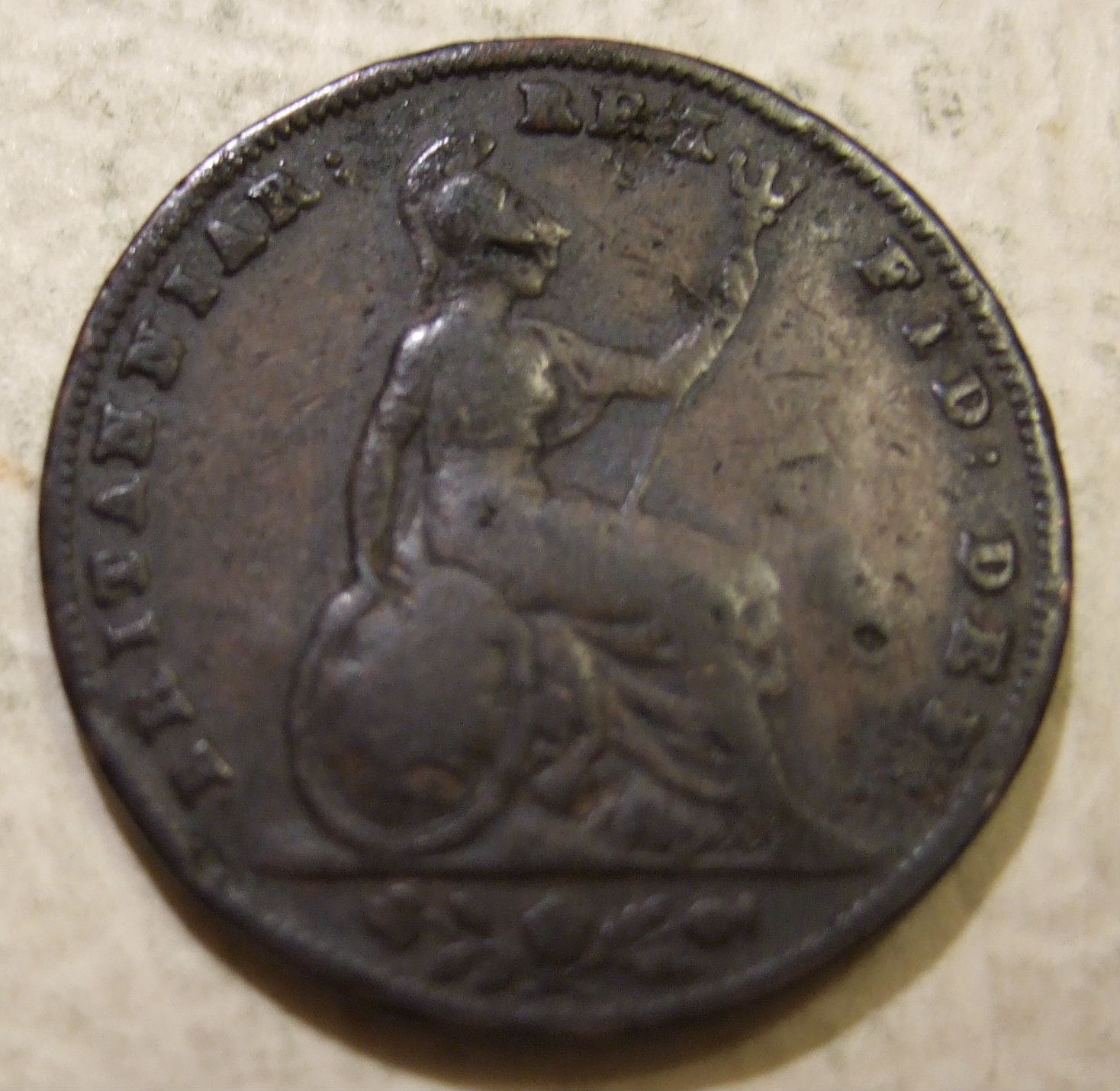
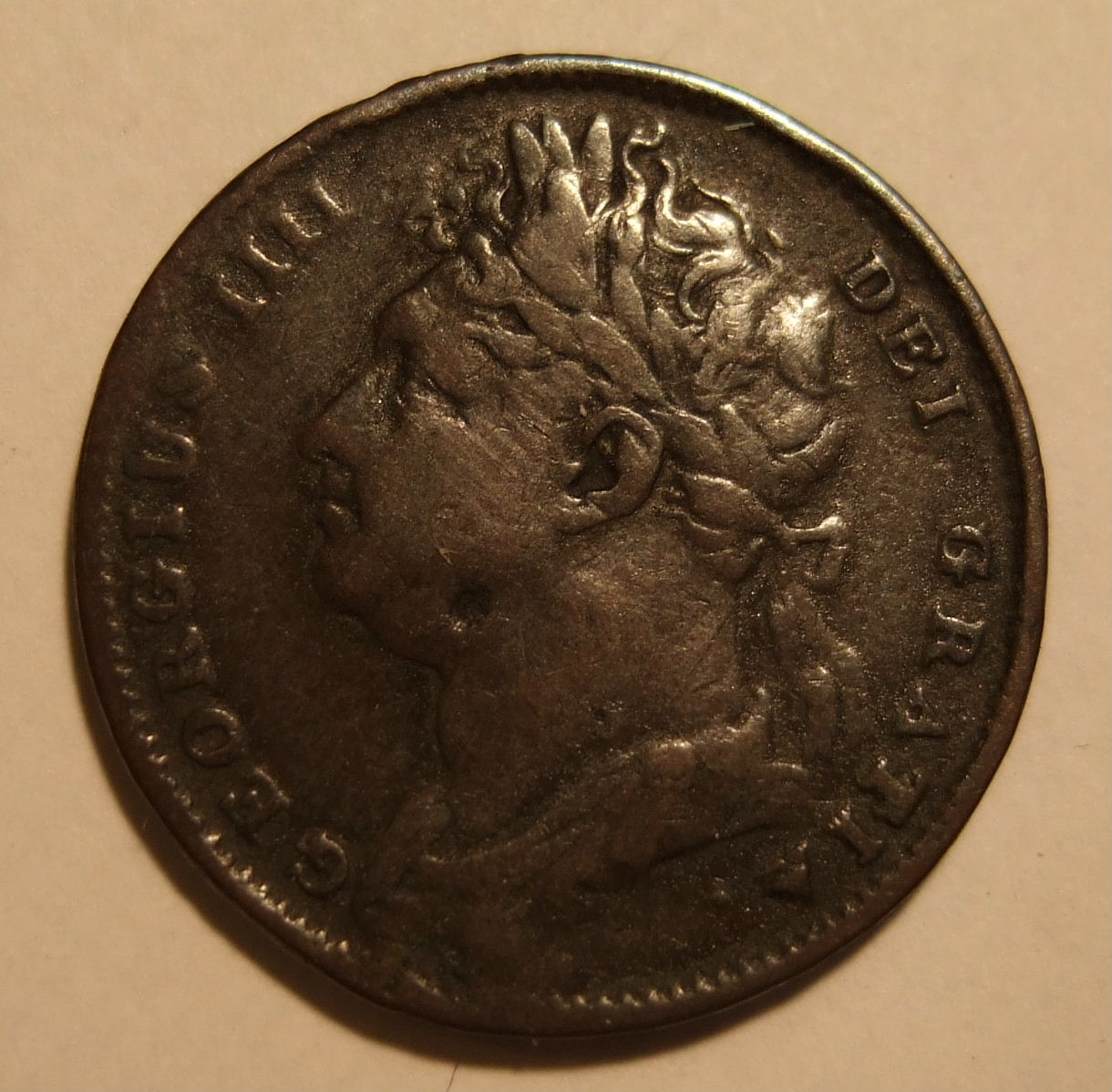
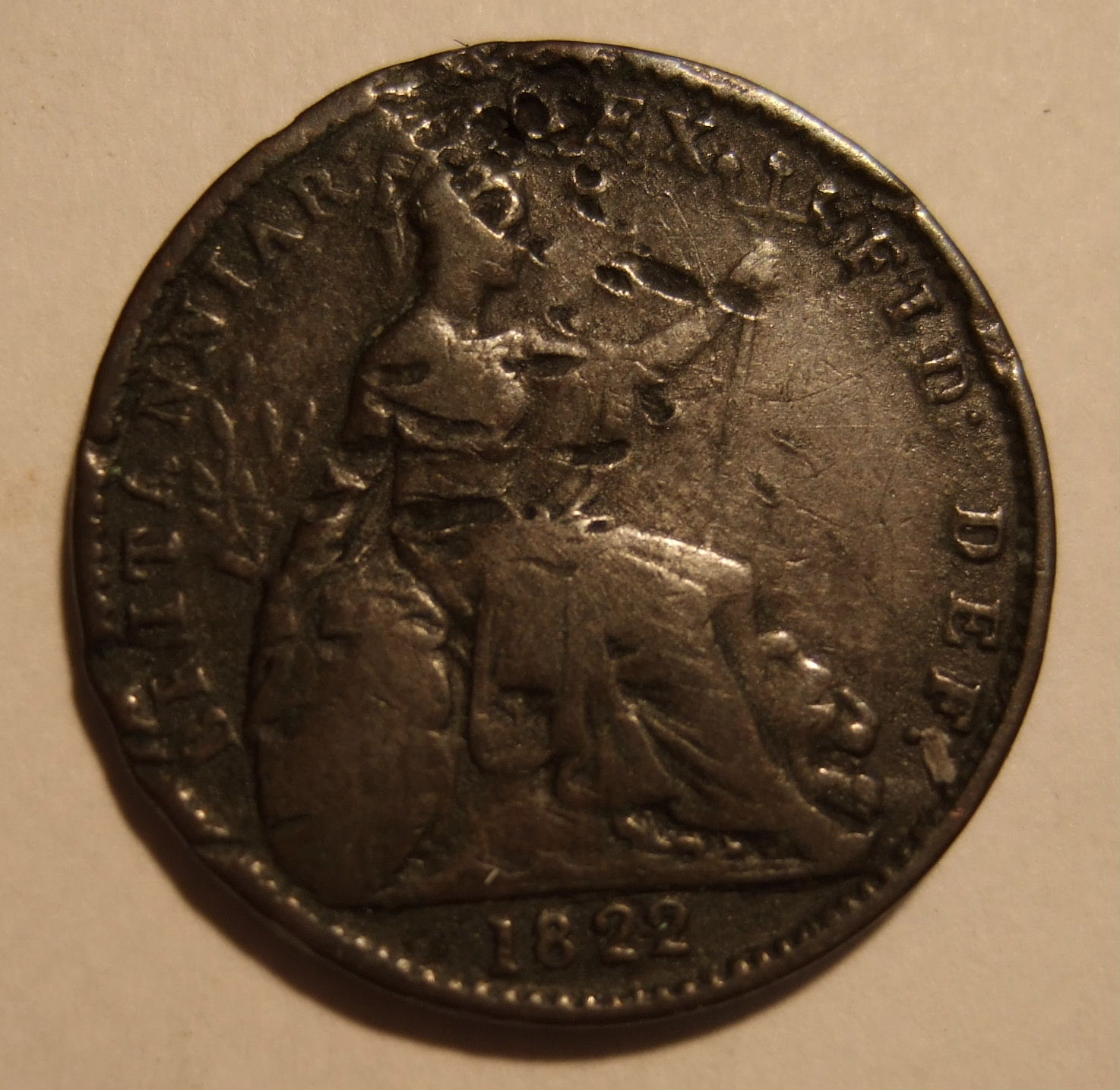
1837 William IV copper halfpenny, worn and oxidised (top); badly worn 1822 George IV farthing (bottom)

Beginning in 1860 and continuing for several years, Britain replaced its copper coinage with bronze pieces. The copper coins (principally the penny, halfpenny and farthing) had been struck since 1797 in various sizes, all of which were seen as too large. Over time the copper metal wore or oxidised, or had advertising punched into it, and there were also counterfeits and foreign coins in circulation. The state of the copper coinage was ascertained by a survey in 1856 and 1857 in connection with the Royal Commission on Decimal Coinage. Though the commission recommended no action on moving toward decimalisation, the Master of the Mint, Thomas Graham, persuaded the chancellor of the Exchequer, William Gladstone, that it would be an opportune time to replace the copper coinage with smaller, lighter coins of bronze, which would be more durable. Gladstone secured authorising legislation and a vote of funds in parliament. The chief engraver of the Royal Mint, Leonard Charles Wyon, was tasked with rendering designs for the new coinage.

Wyon produced an obverse for the new coins depicting Queen Victoria, who modelled for him multiple times and let her views be known, leading to delays as Wyon sought to secure her approval. The reverse featured Britannia, as Wyon had been directed. There was initially some controversy over the Latin abbreviations in the inscriptions on the new issue, with some believing that there were errors that might require it to be withdrawn. With the aid of two outside firms, the Royal Mint struck enough of the new bronze coins to start calling in the copper pieces in 1861, a process complete after 1877, though less than half, in terms of value, of the extant coppers were paid in. The new coins remained current until the run-up to decimalisation in 1971, except for the farthing, which was demonetised from 1 January 1961.

== Background ==
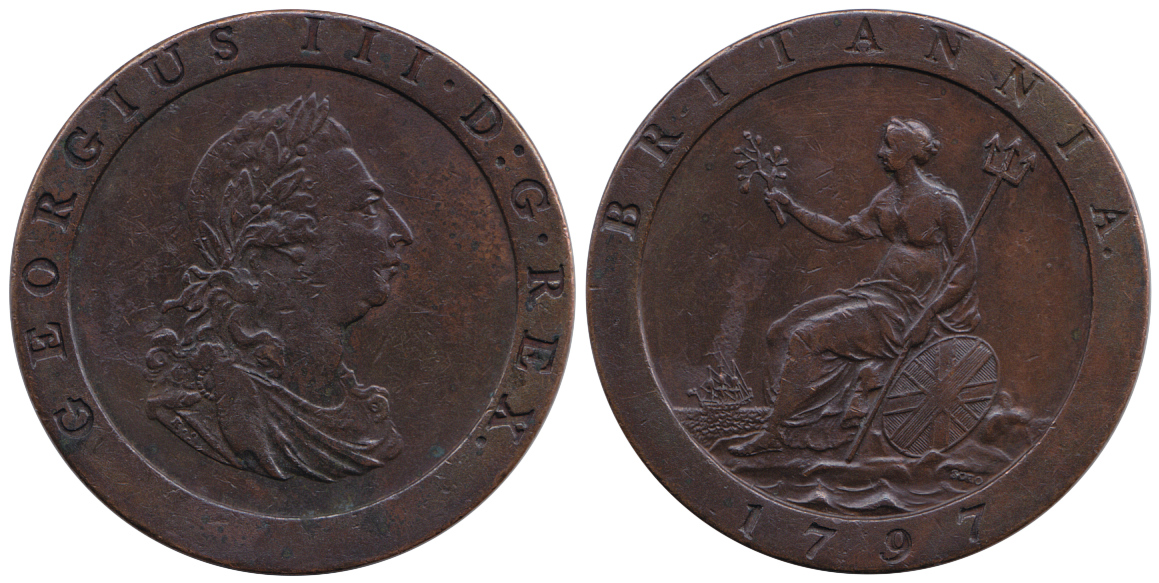
Matthew Boulton's 1797 penny struck at the Soho Mint

By the late 1850s it had become clear that the copper penny and its fractions were unacceptably large. Copper was an expensive metal to be used for small denominations. There were enough copper coins in circulation to satisfy demand in Great Britain, thanks in large part to the huge numbers of coins struck under contract by Matthew Boulton fifty or more years previously. Nevertheless, the copper coinage (the penny, halfpenny, farthing and the rarely seen twopence and half-farthing pieces) remained, according to the numismatic scholar G. P. Dyer, "heavy, cumbersome and inconvenient".

Those copper coins depicting Queen Victoria showed her as she had looked as a young woman, a design created twenty years previously. Three newly struck pennies weighed 2 ounces (57 g), as did six halfpennies or twelve farthings. Boulton's 1797 pennies, of which many remained in circulation, weighed in at 1 ounce (28 g), though many had become lighter through the wearing of the soft copper metal. Confusion was increased by there being coins struck to two other standards also remaining in trade: halfpennies and farthings struck by Boulton beginning in 1799, and Irish coins made legal currency in Great Britain in the 1820s. Coins of each of these standards often showed considerable wear, which could make it difficult to ascertain whether a coin was a large halfpenny or a small, worn penny. Also circulating were counterfeits, coins that had been stamped with advertising, and foreign issues. Chambers's Edinburgh Journal wrote in 1860

what a bruised, battered, ill-matched, ill-conditioned lot are a shilling's worth of halfpence [24 pieces]: large and small, thick and thin, old and new, pierced with holes, dented and scarred by wanton ill-treatment, disfigured by advertising newspaper proprietors, or that numerous but disgusting class of people who persist in placing vulgar names or initials where they are least to be desired.

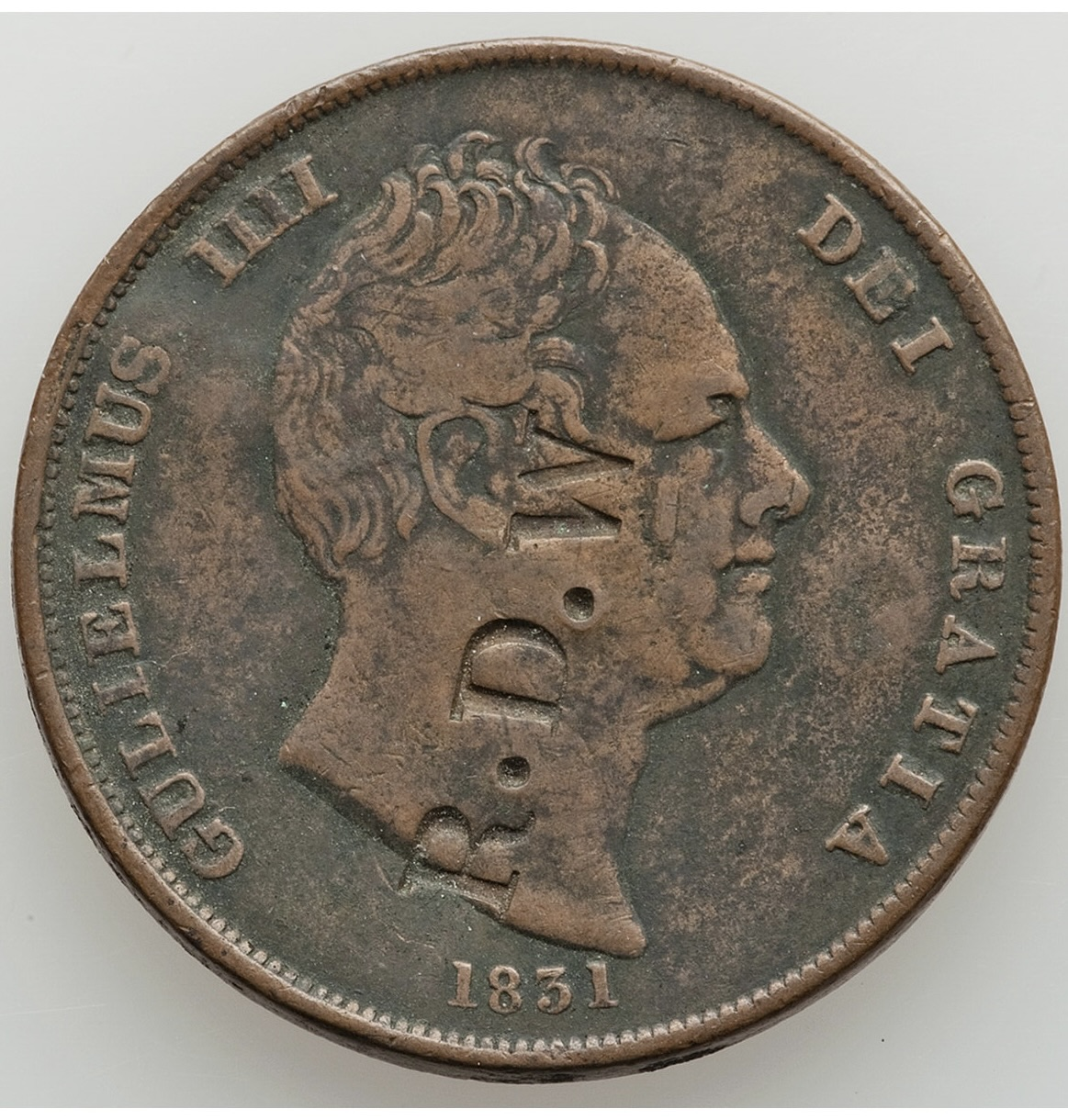
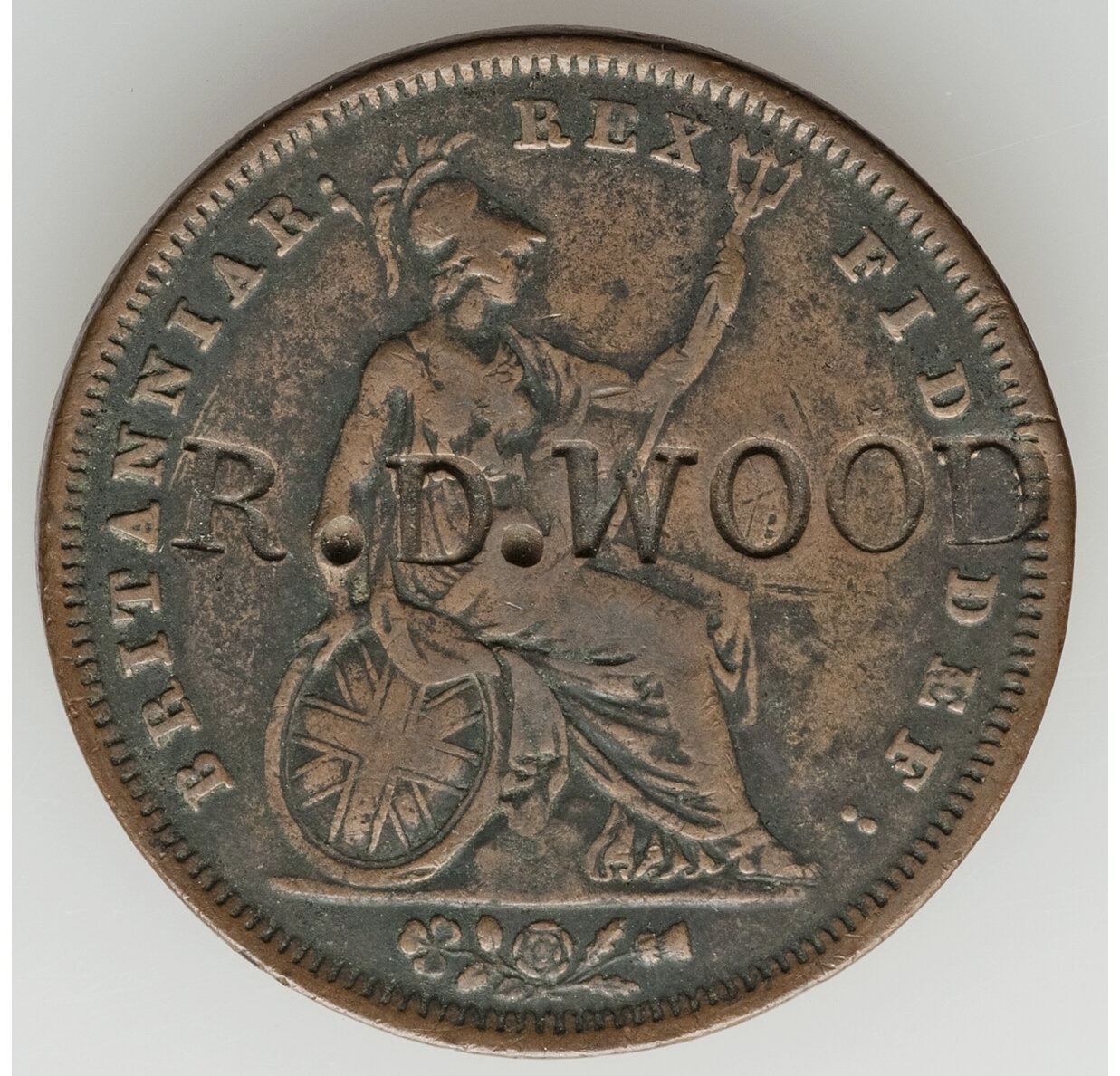
1831 William IV penny marked by advertising

The poor state of the copper coinage was demonstrated by investigations carried out by the Royal Mint in 1856 and 1857 in connection with the Royal Commission on Decimal Coinage, for it was considered likely that if decimal coinage was adopted, the copper coinage would have to be replaced. That commission had been appointed following the advocacy of the master of the Mint, the scientist Sir John Herschel, who had served on two previous inquiries into decimal coinage. Herschel resigned as master in 1856, the year of the commission's appointment, due to ill health. Although the final report found the idea of decimalisation had "few merits", the new master, Thomas Graham, persuaded the chancellor of the Exchequer, William Gladstone, that the copper coinage should be replaced. Bronze was chosen as it was harder than pure copper, and the Royal Mint had some experience with it, having recently struck bronze coins for Nova Scotia and for the Province of Canada. Graham evidently enjoyed the contact with cabinet ministers, writing to his sister, "it is a little curious to find myself taken into council by the Government ... and to be talking over affairs of state with the Chancellor of the Exchequer ... over a parlour fire in Downing Street".

== Preparation ==
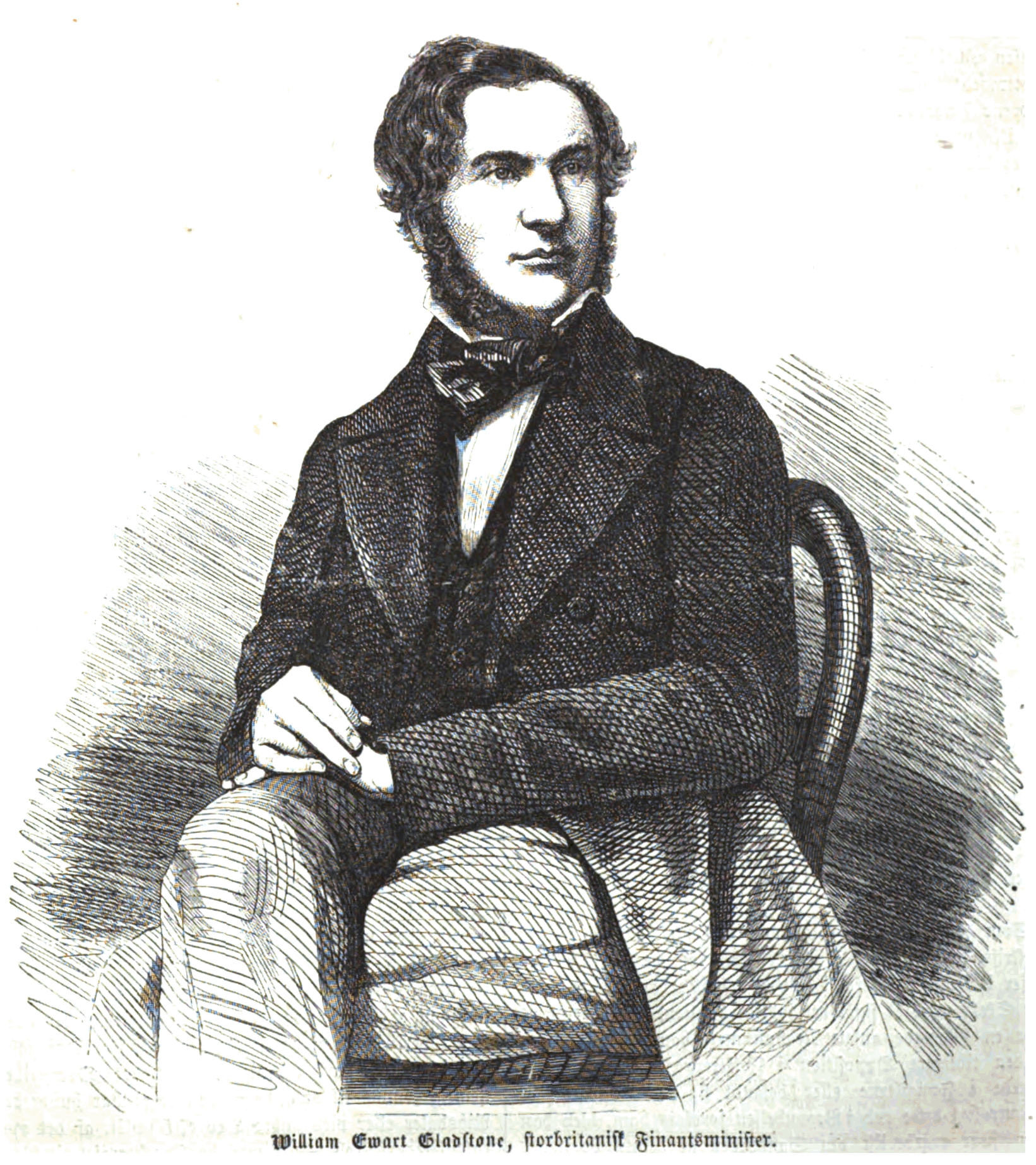
Gladstone

On 4 August 1859 Gladstone, as Chancellor of the Exchequer, succeeded in gaining a vote of £10,000 (equivalent to £1,086,000 in 2025) to be used to replace the copper coinage. The original request had been for £50,000, but Gladstone told the House of Commons that the lesser sum would be sufficient to call in the heavy copper coinage and restrike it into lighter bronze pieces. He reminded members that there was a bill pending before parliament to make the forgery of coins of mixed metal (such as bronze) as punishable as the forgery of coppers. He stated that the Royal Mint would profit on the exchange, but the £10,000 was needed for preliminary expenses. The bill extending the laws relating to copper coins to those of mixed metal gained royal assent on 13 August 1859.

Although there were calls for a public competition, Leonard Charles Wyon, the Engraver to the Royal Mint, was called upon to prepare designs for the new bronze coins. He was already working on the project, and several days after the vote in the House of Commons, Gladstone expressed his satisfaction with pattern coins that Graham had sent him. The prospect of new coins excited some reaction in the press: The Literary Gazette desired that the new coin designs would be a credit to the country and that they would show the Queen, by then a grandmother, as "more matronly"; The Mechanics' Magazine similarly hoped the new coins would "tell the truth" (the current portrait of Victoria had been on the penny since 1839).

Wyon was instructed that Britannia should be on the reverse of the new bronze penny; she had appeared on the copper coinage since the reign of Charles II in the 17th century. According to the numismatic scholar Howard Linecar, it was felt that to remove Britannia from the coinage would be to signify that Britain no longer ruled the waves.

After Wyon had worked on designs for both sides of the coins, he went to the royal residence at Osborne House on the Isle of Wight on 7 December 1859 where, according to Wyon, Victoria "sat, or rather stood, to me, and told me that she would do so again when I was ready". Wyon went to Osborne House again on 16 December, and both the Queen and Prince Albert expressed their pleasure at the work so far.

On 20 February 1860 William Ewart asked in the House of Commons why the coins had not yet appeared. Gladstone responded that the artist had not yet completed the work and that he was loath to interfere, lest he cause the work to suffer. This exchange caused The Mechanics' Magazine to express astonishment that six months' work had not yet produced designs for three coins, and to regret that there had not been a public competition. On 23 February Wyon went to the Royal Mint to show Graham two pattern coins for the penny, which the Master of the Mint thought were satisfactory.

Wyon continued to prepare pattern coins. One was probably given to the Queen by Gladstone in late March for, on 27 March, Wyon went to Buckingham Palace, where both the Queen and Prince Albert criticised the work. He returned on 30 March; Albert was not there, but Victoria had slight criticisms. Wyon went to Windsor Castle on 9 April; he did not see the royal couple, but the coin he had brought was taken up and was returned with the Queen's approval. According to one account, the example that the Queen approved was stolen when posted to the Royal Mint.

Graham took a coin, possibly the one Victoria had approved, to show Gladstone on 16 April. Wyon had been instructed to have the inscription on the obverse of the coins read, VICTORIA D.G. BRITANNIAR. REG. F.D. (short for "Victoria, by the grace of God, Queen of the Britains, Defender of the Faith"). He found, though, he did not have room for F.D. unless he shortened BRITANNIAR, which was already short for Britanniarum (genitive plural of Britannia). Wyon had put BRIT on the approved coin. Gladstone concurred with the inclusion of F.D., likely remembering the public outrage when in 1849, the new florin had omitted D.G. (Dei Gratia, by the grace of God), and been dubbed the "godless florin". Gladstone, a classical scholar as well as a politician, insisted on BRITT rather than BRIT, noting that the abbreviation of a plural noun in Latin should have its final consonant doubled. Graham checked Gladstone's ruling with Edward Hawkins of the British Museum, who agreed with the Chancellor.

The alteration to BRITT was completed by 20 May 1860, after which Wyon worked on the master coinage dies and other necessary equipment. He had completed all but the reverse of the farthing by 13 June, and that followed two days later. Production began, and on 30 June, Graham submitted examples of the new bronze coinage to Gladstone, seeking final approval.

Wyon entered in his diary for 4 July 1860, "bad news today:—The Queen wishes the portraits on the new copper [sic] coins to be altered". It is not clear what Victoria was dissatisfied with, but approval of revisions came on 9 July. There were, however, still unspecified difficulties. On 16 July Gladstone was questioned in the Commons about the delays; he blamed the problems on "a mysterious secret of art". The delays threatened Wyon's departure to the Continent on holiday, but he departed as planned on 23 July. Work continued in his absence, and on 6 August, Gladstone wrote to Graham that the Queen had approved the new coins. By the end of September they were being produced in large numbers. The result was the Bun penny, called after the Queen's hairstyle; examples remained in circulation until decimalisation 110 years later.

== Release and reaction ==
—The new bronze coinage, the issue of which has been announced this week, is now stated to have been called in. The reason assigned is that objection is taken to the use of the term "Britt." as an abbreviation for "Britanniarum," the repetition of the "t" being deemed erroneous.
—We are requested to state that the report in a morning paper that the new copper coinage had been recalled on any ground is without foundation, and that the issue proceeds.—Times.

— "Trade and Commerce", The Royal Cornwall Gazette, Falmouth Packet, and General Advertiser (Truro, Cornwall), 7 December 1860, p. 2.

The new bronze coins were released beginning 26 November 1860, although they had not been made current by proclamation; this did not occur until 17 December. There was considerable reaction, much of it focused on the use of BRITT. There were rumours that this was an error and that the coins would soon be called in. BRITT had appeared on the sixpences and shillings of 1816, but BRIT on the current issue of florins, which were not altered to read BRITT until 1868. The BRITT controversy resulted in a series of letters to The Times, with one likely written by Graham, and a paper read before the Numismatic Society of London. Stated The Mechanics' Magazine: "The advantages which will accrue to the public from the introduction of the new money form a consideration of much more practical importance than pedantic quibblings about the second t in 'Britt'."

The new coins were 95 per cent copper, 4 per cent tin and 1 per cent zinc. The penny weighed 0.333 ounces (9.45 g) and was 1.213 inches (30.81 mm) in diameter, with the halfpenny 0.200 ounces (5.66 g) and 1.003 inches (25.47 mm) and the farthing 0.100 ounces (2.83 g) and 0.794 inches (20.16 mm). Ten pennies, twelve halfpennies or fifteen farthings laid side by side measured 1 foot (0.30 m).

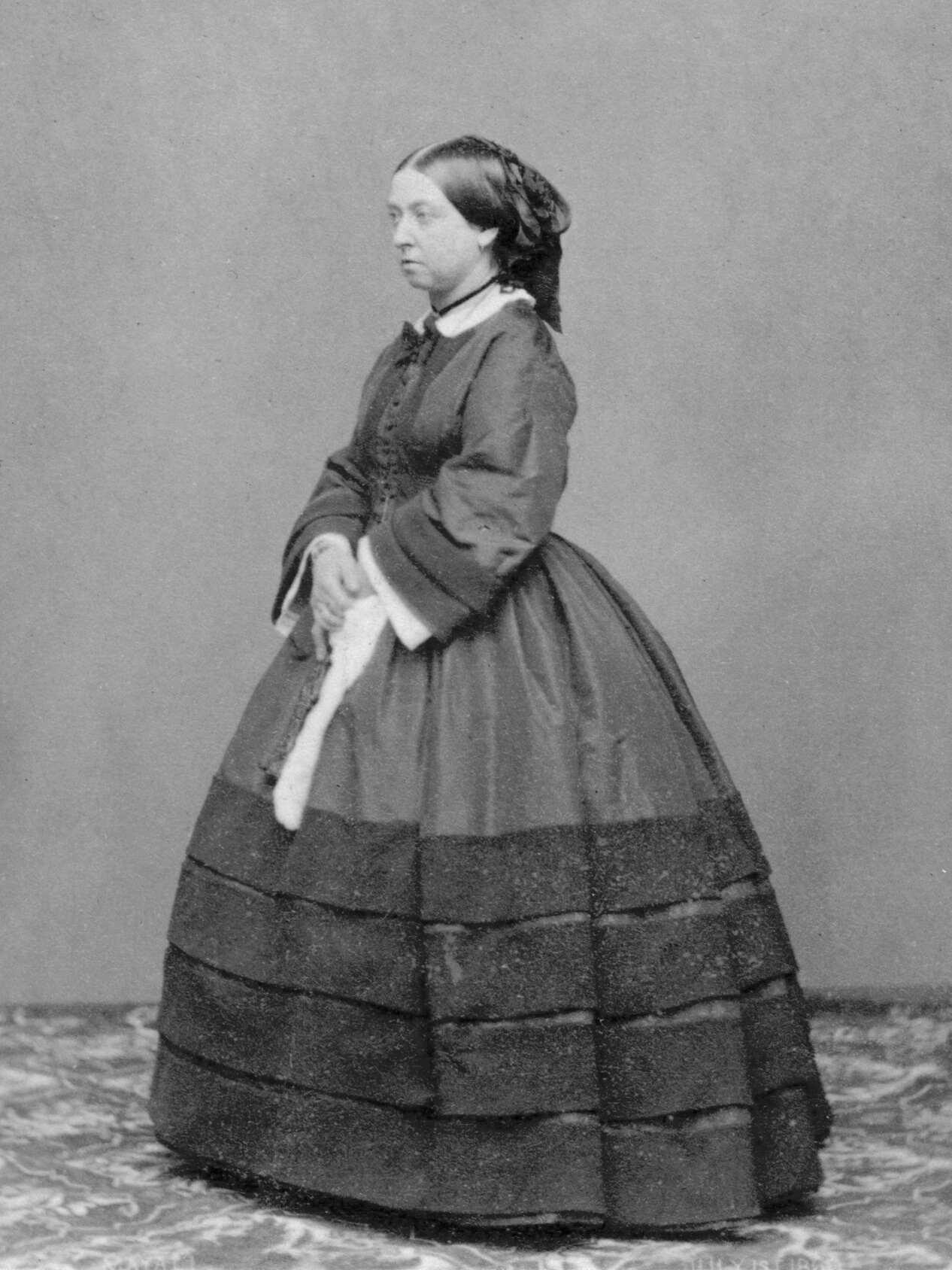
Victoria c. 1860

The Morning Post opined that the likeness of Victoria is "unsatisfactory, as, except on the halfpenny, it bears no resemblance whatever to the Queen". The Globe found that the new bronze coinage had "many advantages", including the hardness of the metal, but "as a work of art it hardly comes up to what might have been expected at the present day." The Morning Chronicle predicted that the new coins "will prove a great convenience when time has made the public accustomed to them".

The Mechanics' Magazine felt that Wyon had captured the Queen's features adequately, but there was something inaccurate about the form of her head. It disliked the rendition of Britannia, though stating that Wyon had done the best he could. Other than these criticisms, it felt that the new coins were a "complete success": their lightness and the fact that the denomination of the coin was stated on the reverse (ending confusion about the value of worn pieces) would benefit the public. Sebastian Evans, in a paper read for him before the Numismatic Society by John Evans, questioned the likeness of Victoria and disliked the placement of a sailing ship and a lighthouse of almost equal size on either side of Britannia: "altogether, on both obverse and reverse, the design is feebler and the work less satisfactory than in any former coin of the reign".

== Production and aftermath ==
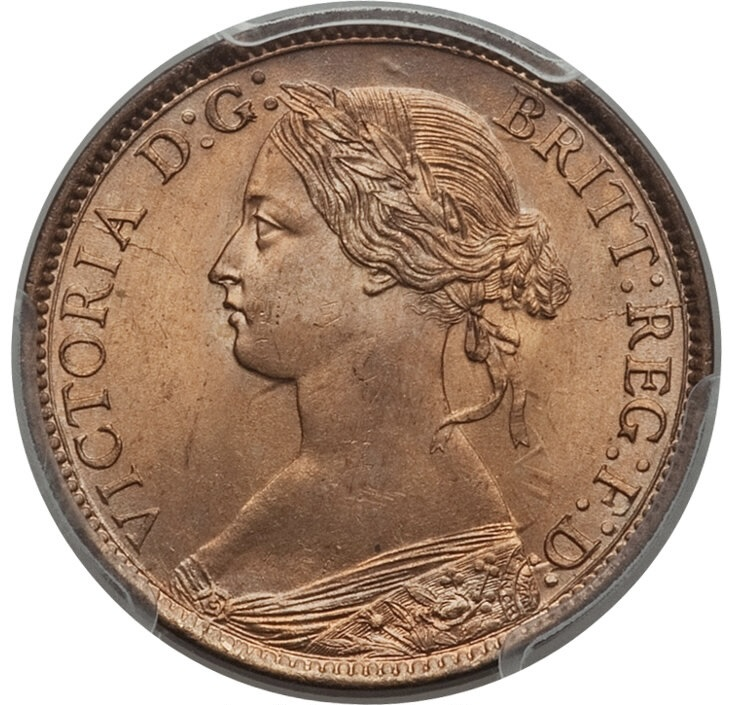
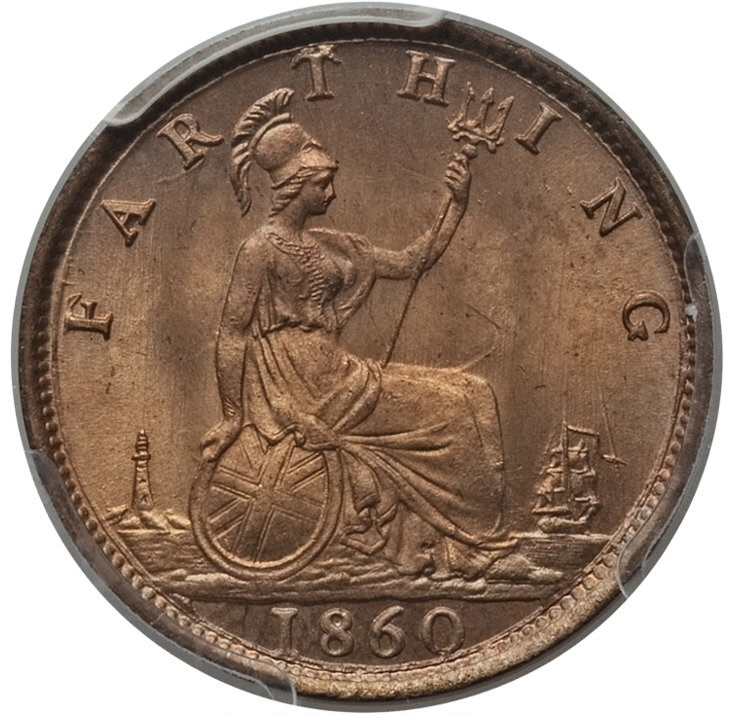
An 1860 bronze farthing

Rapid, large-scale production of bronze coins was new to the Royal Mint. Accordingly, several difficulties were encountered at the start, resulting in broken or prematurely-worn coinage dies. Replacing the copper coinage with bronze was beyond the capacity of the Royal Mint, which was busy with the production of silver and gold coins. The Mint put out to tender a contract to strike 1,720 long tons (1,750 t; 1,930 short tons) of the new bronze pennies, halfpennies and farthings. It was awarded to James Watt & Co of Birmingham. When the company proved slow to begin, Ralph Heaton & Sons, also of Birmingham, were awarded a supplemental contract to strike 60 long tons (61 t; 67 short tons) of coins. This was not fulfilled in its entirety, as by mid-1861 Watt's were making progress towards fulfilling their contract, which they completed on 11 June 1863: Heaton's had struck 41 long tons (42 t; 46 short tons) by March 1862 and did not again strike British bronze coins for several years. These two firms were experienced in the production of bronze coinage, having struck between them much of the recent French and Belgian bronze issues. Each charged £4 10s. (decimalised as £4.50 (equivalent to £473.073 in 2025)) per 1 long ton (1.0 t; 1.1 short tons) more than it would cost to strike the same number of coins at the Royal Mint.

The weight of the penny was halved, so that 48 of them would weigh a pound avoirdupois (454g), and it was made thinner to make it as large in diameter as possible. Out of concerns that the farthing would be too small if lightened to the same degree, that coin and the halfpenny were put on a standard so that 40 pence worth would weigh a pound avoirdupois. The Royal Mint were concerned that the public would object to the new bronze coins as having metal worth considerably less than their face values but found that the public did not expect a penny to contain copper worth a penny.

Since speed of production was a priority, and there were three different sources of supply, there are a large number of varieties in the early years of the bronze coinage. Over £1 million in bronze coins was struck during the first three years of issue, and by 1877 the figure had increased to £1,367,963 (equivalent to £138,000,000 in 2025), of which about £60,000 (equivalent to £6,000,000 in 2025) was transported to the colonies.

To get the new coins quickly into circulation, the Royal Mint paid for their shipment to any part of the country; this programme led to local surpluses and was stopped at the end of 1872. Calling in of the copper coinage began in mid-1861, and the facilities of the Post Office were used. In urban areas copper quickly vanished from circulation, but in country districts the transition took several years.

The Royal Mint offered a premium of two per cent for the old copper coins to the end of 1869, at which time the coppers were demonetised within the United Kingdom, but the Mint still redeemed them at face value. In February 1873 Charles William Fremantle, Deputy Master of the Royal Mint, recommended that the coppers no longer be accepted, as the amounts being submitted had become insignificant, and this was done with effect from 31 July 1873. The Royal Mint continued to receive applications to exchange the old copper coinage, generally from those in country districts, for several years afterwards. All were refused. An extension was granted to the colonies as no steps had been taken in some of them to call in old coppers. Originally, the date of demonetisation was to be 30 June 1876, but it was extended to 31 December 1877.

On 20 June 1876 the Royal Mint received a shipment of old copper coins of total face value £256 5s. (256 pounds and five shillings), from the Crown Agents for the Colonies, who requested that payment of £200 be made in the form of pennies, halfpennies and farthings, with the remaining sum to be paid in the form of newly-minted third farthings. All were to be sent to Malta, where the third farthings were legal tender. The Royal Mint did so, striking 162,000 third farthings.

In the Australian colonies the copper coinage could be exchanged at the Sydney Mint from 1868 to 1877, and at the Melbourne Mint in 1877. In the colony of South Australia, a proclamation was issued on 17 December 1876 declaring the copper coins no longer legal tender, but in January 1877 it was announced the colony's treasury would accept the coppers in amounts of not less than five shillings until 11 April 1877.

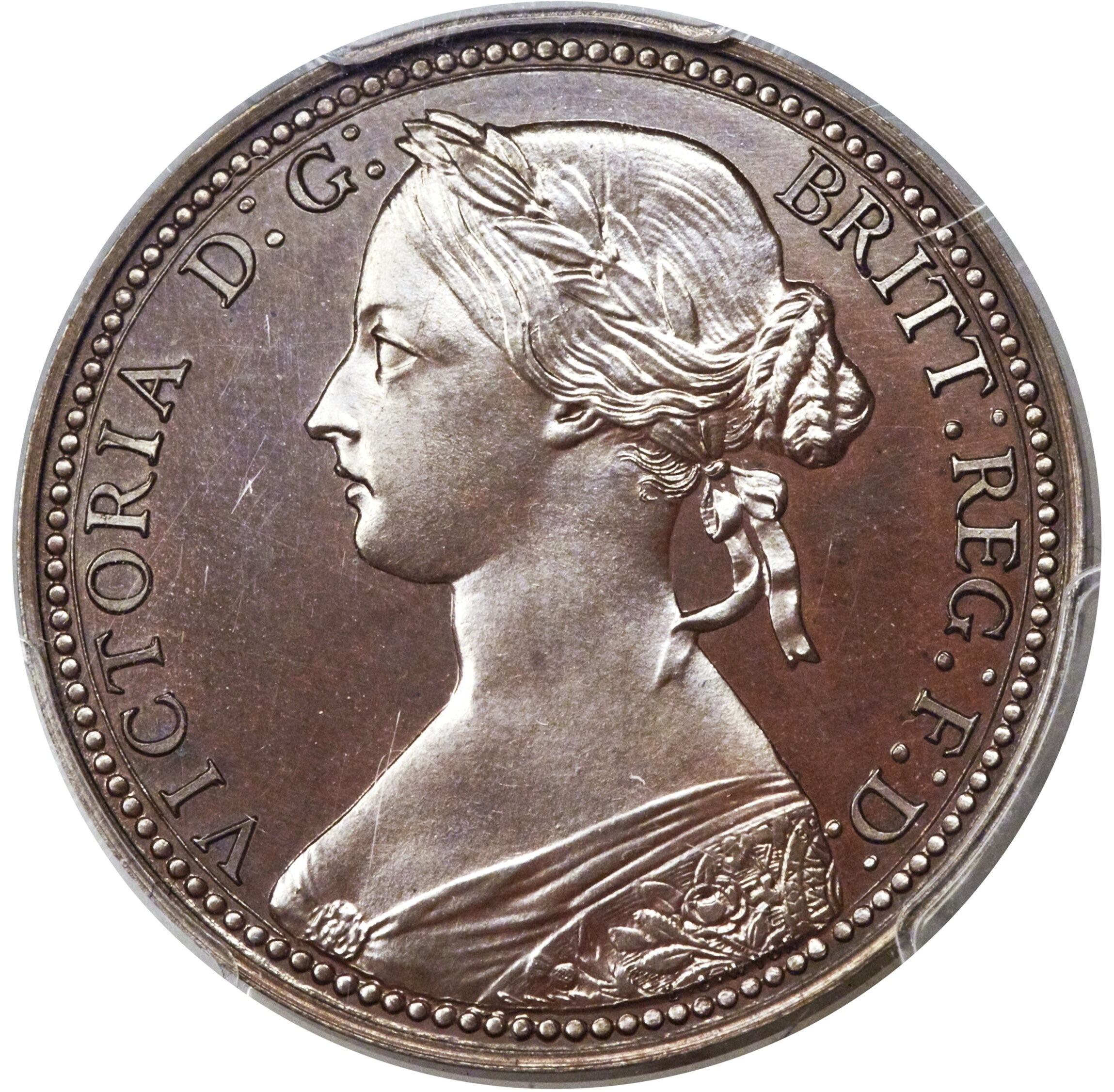
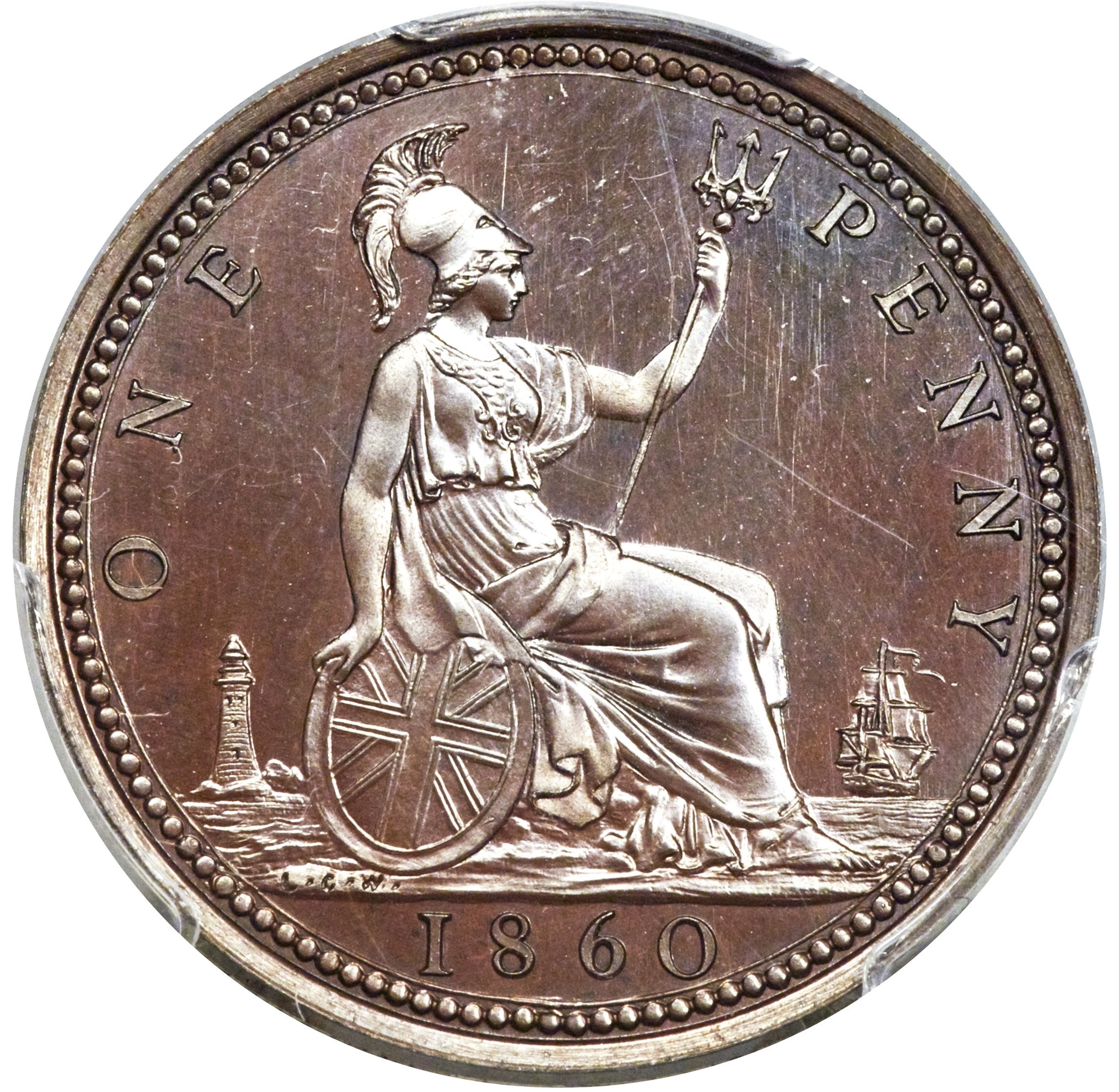
1860 Victoria bronze penny

Little was done in Cape Colony in South Africa or in New Zealand to call in the coppers, but £32,000 (equivalent to £3,200,000 in 2025) came from Ceylon (later Sri Lanka). A total of £580,000 (equivalent to £54,500,000 in 2025) in the old coppers was withdrawn from the United Kingdom, with £44,000 (equivalent to £4,400,000 in 2025) more taken from overseas. This still left £656,376 (equivalent to £67,600,000 in 2025) in coppers struck between 1797 and 1860 unredeemed. Fremantle suggested that much of the unredeemed copper, especially from the early, heavier issues, was melted down privately for its metal, and therefore that most of the pre-1860 coins had been accounted for.

The Bun penny, with Wyon's obverse, and its analogue for the halfpenny and farthing, continued to be struck until replaced with the Old Head coinage in 1895. The three coins continued to bear the same reverses until the halfpenny and farthing were given their own designs in 1937 under George VI; the penny continued to display Wyon's Britannia reverse, with slight modifications, until decimalisation in 1971, ceasing to be legal tender on 31 August. Remaining Bun halfpennies were no longer legal tender from 31 July 1969, and the farthing after 31 December 1960. Despite the change to bronze, the term "copper" continued in colloquial usage as a noun and adjective describing the low-denomination coins.

== Sources ==
- Craig, John (2010) [1953]. The Mint: A History of the London Mint from A.D. 287 to 1948 (paperback ed.). Cambridge University Press. ISBN 978-0-521-17077-2.
- Dyer, G. P. (1982). "Numbered Strikings of Victorian Bronze Coins, 1860–68" (PDF). British Numismatic Journal. 52: 234–240.
- Dyer, G. P. (1996). "Thomas Graham's Copper Survey of 1857" (PDF). British Numismatic Journal. 66: 60–66.
- Dyer, G. P.; Gaspar, P. P. (1984). "Richard Sainthill and the New Bronze Coinage" (PDF). British Numismatic Journal. 54: 263–273.
- Dyer, G. P.; Gaspar, P. P. (1992). "Reform, the New Technology and Tower Hill, 1700–1966". In Challis, C. E. (ed.). A New History of the Royal Mint. Cambridge University Press. pp. 398–606. ISBN 978-0-521-24026-0.
- Freeman, Michael J. (1985) [1970]. The Bronze Coinage of Great Britain (revised ed.). Barrie & Jenkins Ltd. ISBN 978-0-09-155240-4.
- Fremantle, Charles (1874). Fourth Annual Report of the Deputy Master of the Mint. Royal Mint. OCLC 941817362.
- Fremantle, Charles (1877). Seventh Annual Report of the Deputy Master of the Mint. Royal Mint. OCLC 941810864.
- Fremantle, Charles (1878). Eighth Annual Report of the Deputy Master of the Mint. Royal Mint. OCLC 941813808.
- Fremantle, Charles (1879). Ninth Annual Report of the Deputy Master of the Mint. Royal Mint. OCLC 941812794.
- Linecar, H. W. A. (1977). British Coin Designs and Designers. G. Bell & Sons Ltd. ISBN 978-0-7135-1931-0.
- Lobel, Richard, ed. (1999) [1995]. Coincraft's Standard Catalogue English & UK Coins 1066 to Date (5th ed.). Standard Catalogue Publishers Ltd. ISBN 978-0-9526228-8-8.
- Peck, C. Wilson (1960). English Copper, Tin and Bronze Coins in the British Museum 1558–1958. Trustees of the British Museum. OCLC 906173180.
- Seaby, Peter (1985). The Story of British Coinage. B. A. Seaby Ltd. ISBN 978-0-900652-74-5.
- Spink & Son Ltd (2022). Howard, Emma (ed.). Coins of England and the United Kingdom, Decimal Issues 2023 (9th ed.). Spink & Son Ltd. ISBN 978-1-912667-93-2.
