= Victor Janvier =

French sculptor

Victor Janvier (c. 1851–1911) was a French sculptor and engraver notable for inventing the Janvier Reducing Machine, a type of lathe which improved the die making process within mints.
