= Reducing machine =

Type of pantograph lathe

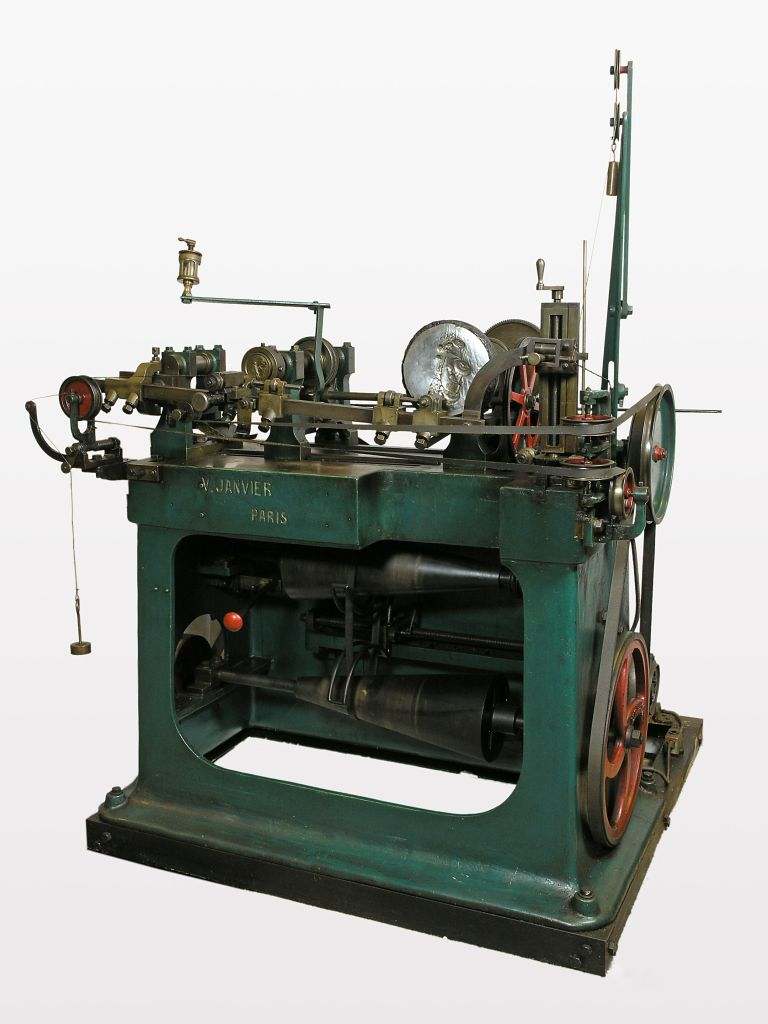
A Janvier reducing machine

A reducing machine was a type of pantograph lathe used until the 21st century to manufacture coin dies. Prior to the machine's introduction, designs were cut by hand into metal dies by a specialist engraver. The reducing machine changed this by allowing artists to create designs on a larger surface area and then have them scaled down and cut into a die automatically. The most successful version of the machine, created by Victor Janvier, was used by mints all around the world, including the United States Mint, which operated one as late as 2008, when it was replaced by CNC milling machines.

== History ==
=== Contamin pantograph ===
From 1836 to 1867, the US Mint operated the first die-engraving pantograph invented by a now-forgotten French inventor whom the machine is named after. It used a rotating cutter to copy a design.

=== Hill pantograph ===
During the mid 1800s Englishman C. J. Hill developed a variation of the Contamin whereby the electrotype was traced horizontally using a treadle. Hill sold his idea to William Wyon, the chief engraver at the Royal Mint, who sold a machine to the US Mint in September 1867.

=== Janvier reducing machine ===
In 1899, French engraver Victor Janvier patented a design which solved the inefficiency problem. By using twin cone belt drives that pointed in opposite directions dies could be cut much faster by increasing the speed as the cutting point moved outwards. After several days a reduction punch is produced, which is then used to produce working dies. Machines using Janvier's improved design were bought by the British Royal Mint in 1901 and by the US Mint in 1907.
