= Jean Baptiste Merlen =

French engraver and medallist (1769–1850)

Thirty pence
- United Kingdom
- Value: 1/8 pound sterling
- Mass: 14.1 g
- Diameter: (Silver) 32 mm
- Edge: Milled
- Composition: (1816–1919) 92.5% Ag
- Years of minting: 1820

Obverse
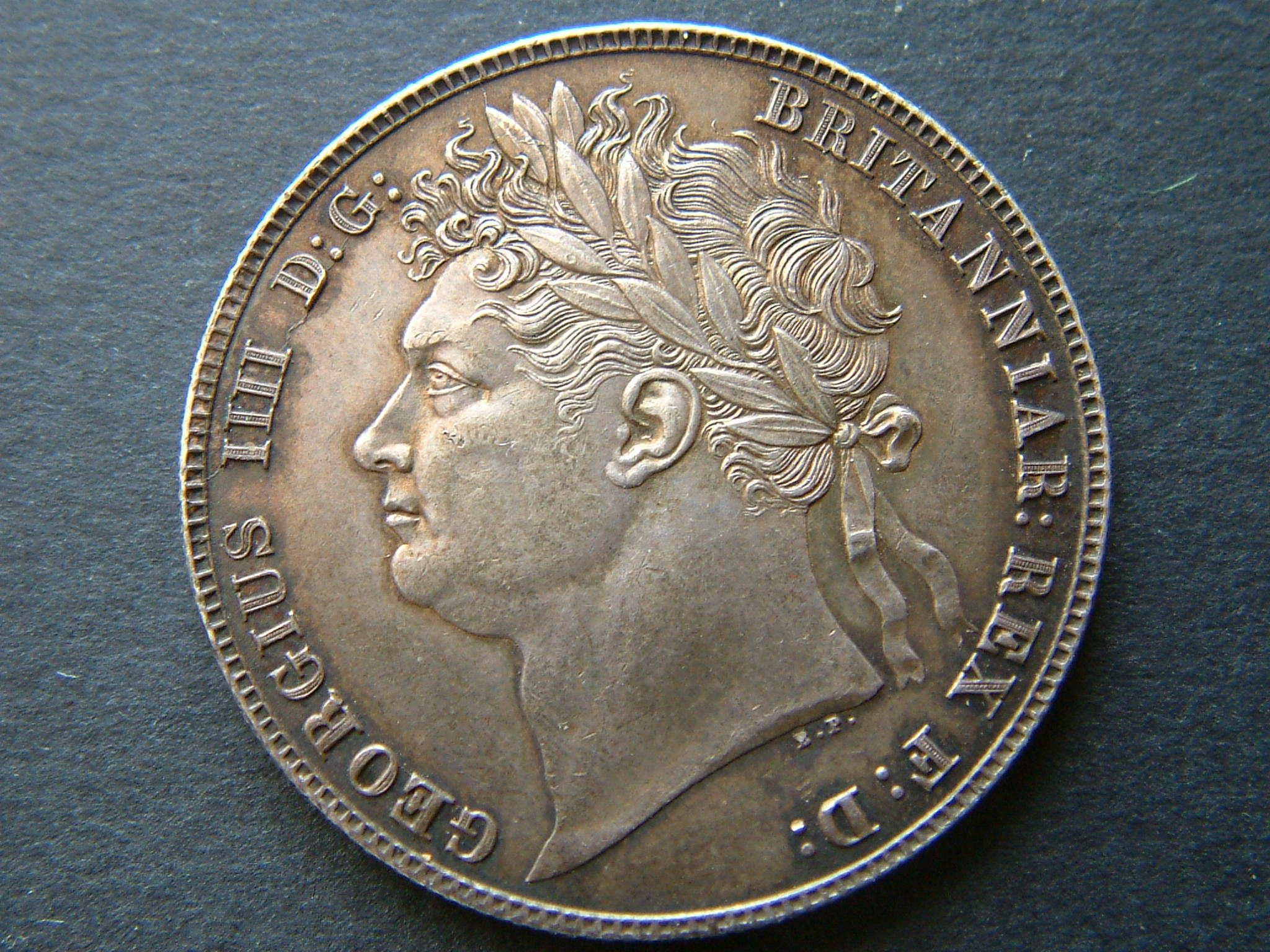
- Design: Benedetto Pistrucci

Reverse
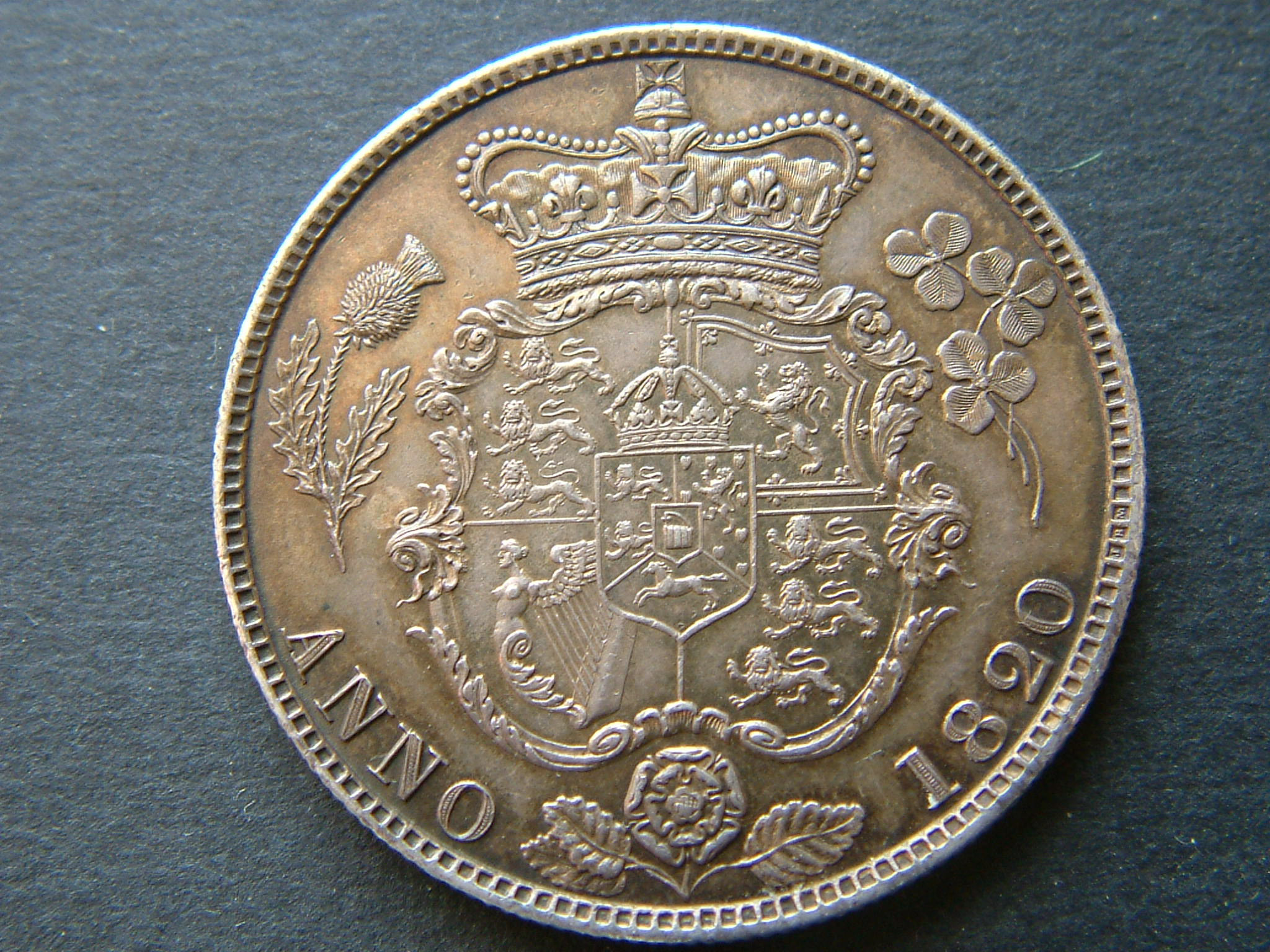
- Design: Jean Baptiste Merlen
- Design date: 1820

Jean Baptiste Merlen (1769–1850) was a French engraver and medallist.

== Biography ==
Merlen began work at the Paris Mint, where he was responsible for designing the medal which celebrated Napoleon's coronation as Emperor in 1804. In 1815, after Napoleon's defeat at the Battle of Waterloo, Merlen’s post at the Paris Mint was uncertain. As a result, he left and moved to London where he searched for work eventually being offered a post at the Royal Mint from February 1820. It is believed Benedetto Pistrucci, an established engraver at the Royal Mint in London, may well have met him in France and offered the post to Merlen in London. As Merlen was not eligible for a full-time post at the Royal Mint, he was hired on a temporary basis, with a salary of four guineas (84 shillings)-a-week (equivalent to £351 in 2025).

His most famous work was the obverse portrait of George IV from 1823 of the gold double sovereign, after an original work by Sir Francis Chantrey. The King had disliked the 'overweight' effigy Pistrucci had designed, preferring the Chantrey portrait. Merlen was given the task of engraving the Chantrey image after Pistrucci refused to redesign the effigy following the work of another artist. Merlen's effigy is also notable for being the first to show a male monarch bareheaded, i.e. neither crowned or laureate (in the style of Roman emperors) since the reign of Edward VI.

Merlen was also responsible for the obverse design of the 1823 George IV gold double sovereign, the first currency double sovereign or two pounds coin. Pistrucci had designed an 1820 gold double sovereign three years earlier although this was never issued for general circulation and, as such, is deemed to be a pattern coin and of the highest rarity.

Merlen also designed several reverses, the most widely used being a crowned shield surrounded by a wreath, variants of which were used in issues of William IV and later Queen Victoria. Merlen's initials, the letters 'J' 'B' and 'M' can be found on the first issue George IV halfcrowns dated 1820 and 1821 between the reverse border denticles at approximately 3 o'clock to the right of the shield design (see reverse photograph). The same individual letters used for his initials are also within the reverse beads, to the left of the reverse design, on the corresponding shillings and sixpences of the same period.

Merlen continued to work alongside engraver William Wyon during the early part of Queen Victoria's long reign. Merlen retired from work at the Royal Mint in July 1844 with Wyon continuing until his own death seven years later in 1851. Merlen produced the reverse designs for all the early silver and gold for Victoria coinage. The engraving work was carried out by Wyon's son, Leonard Charles Wyon, who entered service at the Mint upon Merlen's retirement.

The reverse designs by Merlen on the Queen Victoria 'young head' silver half-crowns were identical to those of the gold sovereigns of the same period with the sovereigns attaining the nickname 'shield backs', a description which continues in use today by numismatists.

His designs for the reverses of maundy money remained in use until 1887.

Preceded by Benedetto Pistrucci	Coins of the pound sterling Obverse engraver 1823	Succeeded by William Wyon
