= William Wyon =

British engraver (1795–1851)

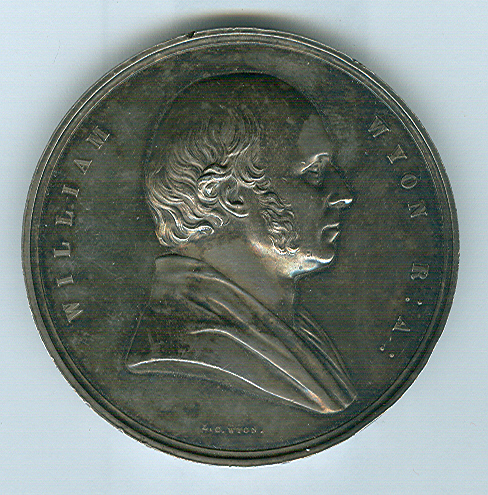
Posthumous medallic portrait of William Wyon by his son L. C. Wyon (1854)

William Wyon RA (1795 – 29 October 1851) was a British engraver who was official chief engraver at the Royal Mint from 1828 until his death.

Indian rupee engraved by Wyon.

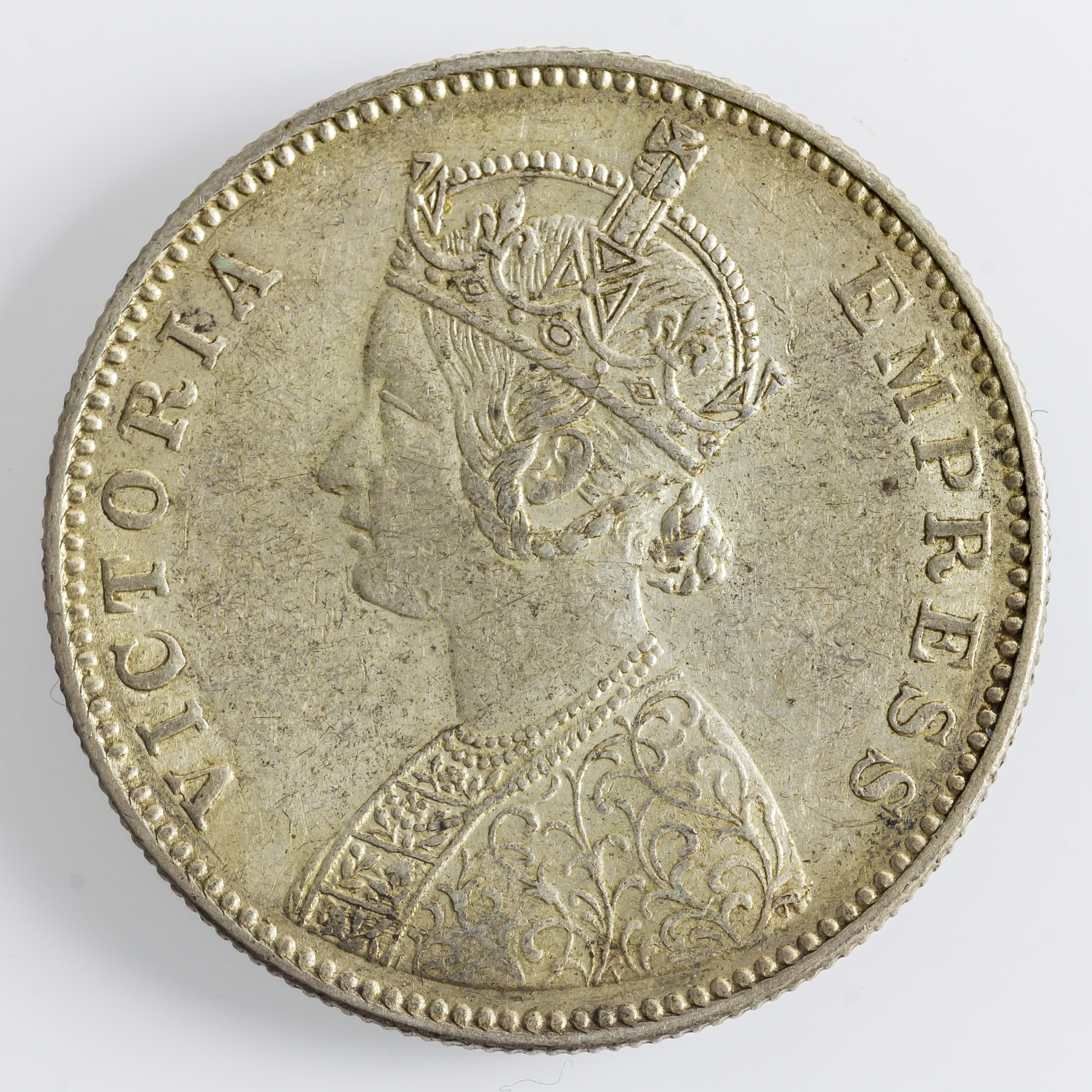
Obverse: Crowned bust of Queen Victoria surrounded by her name.

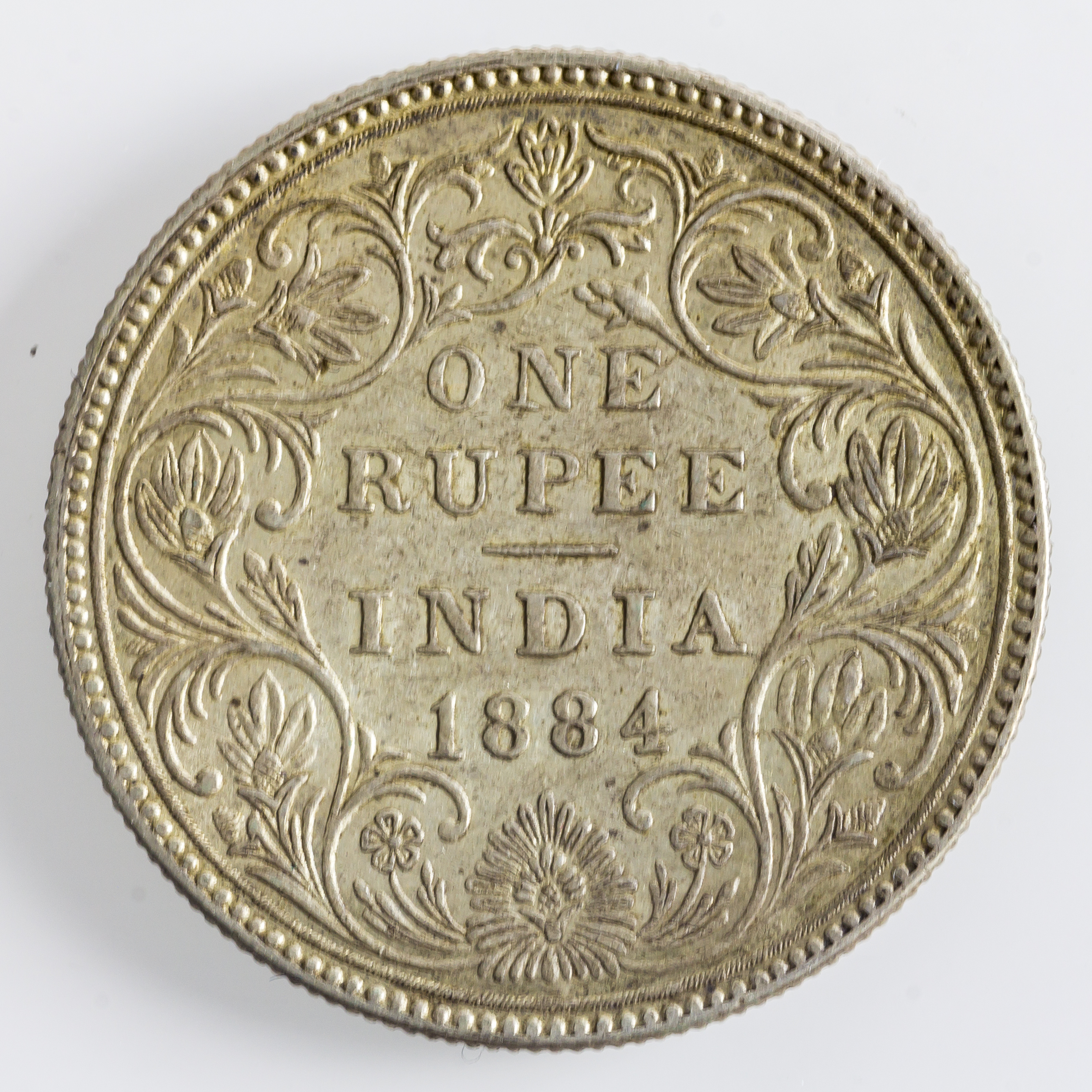
Reverse: Face value, country and date surrounded by wreath.

Coin minted in 1884 and made of 91.7% silver.

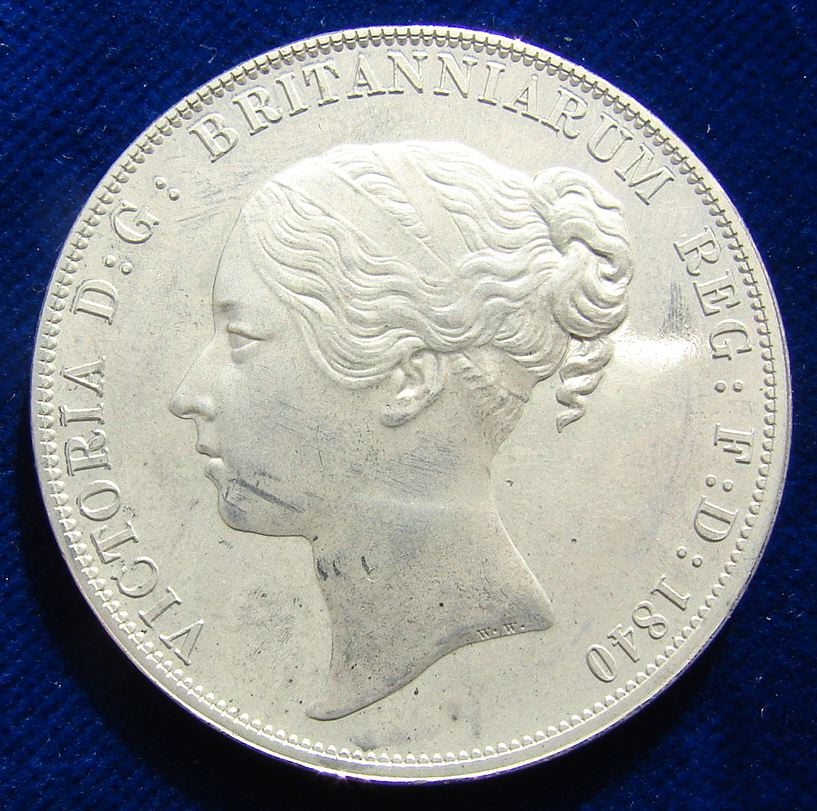
Victoria Young Head by William Wyon, edited as a retro-pattern by the British medallist Donald R Golder for the Spink Patina Collection

== Biography ==
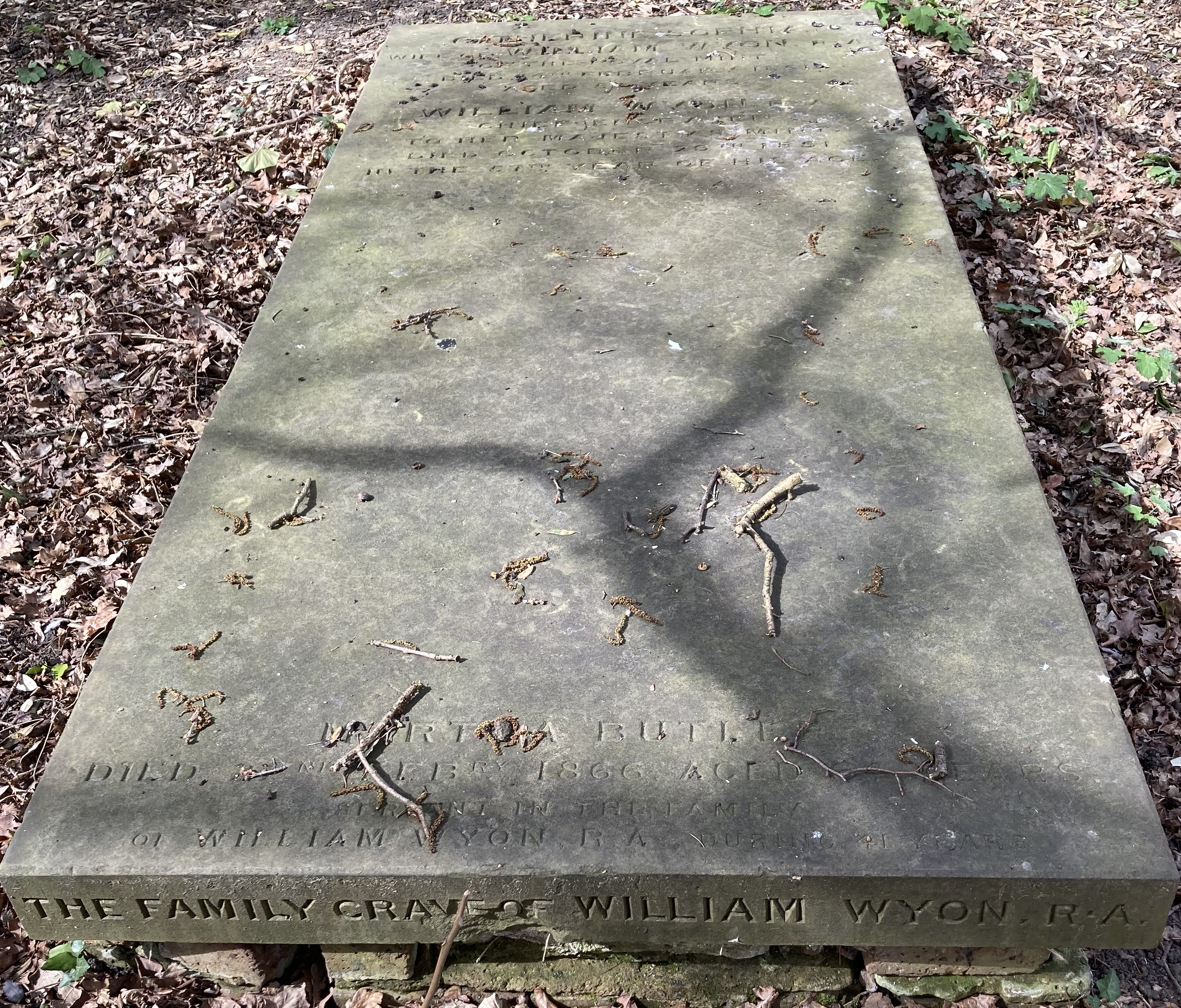
Family grave of William Wyon in West Norwood Cemetery

Wyon was born in Birmingham and, in 1809, was apprenticed to his father, Peter Wyon who was an engraver and die sinker. In 1816, he went to London. He studied the works of John Flaxman, attended the schools of the Royal Academy, and gained a gold medal from the Society of Arts for a copy of the head of Ceres, and a second for an original group. In 1816 he was appointed assistant engraver to the mint, and in 1828 chief engraver. In 1831 he was elected associate and in 1838 full member of the Royal Academy. He died in Brighton, United Kingdom. Wyon is buried under a simple rectangular York stone slab at West Norwood Cemetery. He was the father of engraver Leonard Charles Wyon.

== Designs ==
Under the influence of Flaxman, a master of relief sculpture, Wyon was a highly visible proponent of the Neoclassicist vogue.

In 1834 he modelled the head of Princess Victoria, who was 15 years of age at the time. This work was subsequently used for the City Medal struck in 1837 to celebrate Victoria's first visit to the City of London after her accession to the throne and another medal also issued in 1837 commemorating her visit to the Guildhall.

The name of William Wyon is well known among coin and medal collectors because of his prodigious output and artistic skill. He designed the second and third effigies of George IV, the effigy of William IV in 1830, working from the bust by Sir Francis Chantrey, and "The Young Head", which graced Victoria's coinage from 1838 to 1860 on the pennies and the rest of the coinage until 1887. He also designed the Naval General Service Medal, of which 20,933 were issued. Notable among his medallic work are the obverse designs for the prize, juror and other medals for The Great Exhibition at Crystal Palace in 1851, the year of his death in Birmingham.

Wyon's City Medal was the model for the head on the line-engraved postage stamps of 1840–79, beginning with the Penny Black, the world's first adhesive postage stamp, the embossed stamps of 1847–54 and the postal stationery 1841–1901. The primary die used for the embossed issue was engraved by Wyon; the 1s and 10d stamps have the initials "ww" along with the die number at the base of the neck. His design also influenced the surface-printed stamps first printed in 1855.

== Bibliography ==
- Nicholas Carlisle, A memoir of the life and works of William Wyon, privately printed (1837). On line.

Preceded by Jean Baptiste Merlen	Coins of the pound sterling Obverse sculptor 1825	Succeeded by Leonard Charles Wyon
