= Bun penny =

British coin

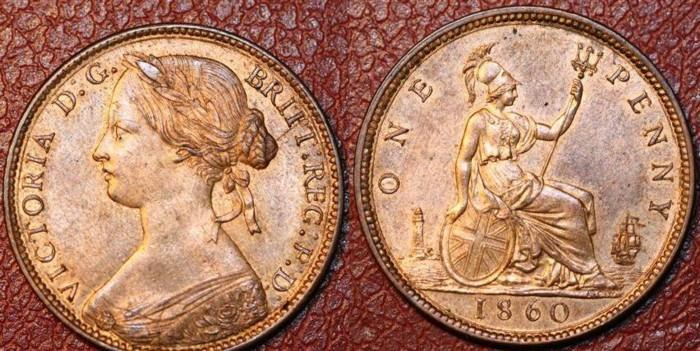
An 1860 bun penny, as designed by L.C. Wyon

The bun penny is a bronze pre-decimal penny (1d) which was issued by the Royal Mint from 1860 to 1894. The designs of both obverse and reverse are by Leonard Charles Wyon. It was the first type of bronze penny issued by the Royal Mint, the incipient issue of a series which was to last until decimalisation in 1971. The bun penny gets its name from Queen Victoria's hairstyle, which is gathered together in a 'bun'.

The bun penny was common in circulation in the United Kingdom until the 1960s, and numerous varieties are known, some of which are of exceptional rarity. The series is one of the most commonly collected in the numismatics of the UK.

== History ==
The Coinage Act 1859 extended the Coinage Offences Act 1832, so far as it related to the then current copper coinage, to cover any coinage of mixed metal issued in replacement of such copper coinage.

== Mintages ==
- 1860 ~ 5,053,440
- 1861 ~ 36,449,280
- 1862 ~ 50,534,400
- 1863 ~ 28,062,700
- 1864 ~ 3,440,640
- 1865 ~ 8,601,600
- 1866 ~ 9,999,360
- 1867 ~ 5,483,520
- 1868 ~ 1,182,720
- 1869 ~ 2,580,480
- 1870 ~ 5,695,022
- 1871 ~ 1,290,318
- 1872 ~ 8,494,572
- 1873 ~ 8,494,200
- 1874 ~ 5,621,865
- 1874H ~ 6,666,240 (Heaton Mint, Birmingham)
- 1875 ~ 10,691,040
- 1875H ~ 752,640 (Heaton Mint, Birmingham)
- 1876H ~ 11,074,560 (Heaton Mint, Birmingham)
- 1877 ~ 9,624,747
- 1878 ~ 2,764,470
- 1879 ~ 7,666,476
- 1880 ~ 3,000,831
- 1881 ~ 2,302,362
- 1881H ~ 3,763,200 (Heaton Mint, Birmingham)
- 1882H ~ 7,526,400 (Heaton Mint, Birmingham)
- 1883 ~ 6,327,438
- 1884 ~ 11,702,802
- 1885 ~ 7,145,862
- 1886 ~ 6,087,759
- 1887 ~ 5,315,085
- 1888 ~ 5,125,020
- 1889 ~ 12,559,737
- 1890 ~ 15,330,840
- 1891 ~ 17,885,961
- 1892 ~ 10,501,671
- 1893 ~ 8,161,737
- 1894 ~ 3,883,452
