= History of the British penny (1714–1901) =

The penny of Great Britain and the United Kingdom from 1714 to 1901, the period in which the House of Hanover reigned, saw the transformation of the penny from a little-used small silver coin to the bronze piece recognisable to modern-day Britons. All bear the portrait of the monarch on the obverse; copper and bronze pennies have a depiction of Britannia, the female personification of Britain, on the reverse.

During most of the 18th century, the penny was a small silver coin rarely seen in circulation, and that was principally struck to be used for Maundy money or other royal charity. Beginning in 1787, the chronic shortage of good money resulted in the wide circulation of private tokens, including large coppers valued at one penny. In 1797 industrialist Matthew Boulton gained a contract to produce official pennies at his Soho Mint in Birmingham; he struck millions of pennies over the next decade. After that, it was not until 1825 that pennies were struck again for circulation, and the copper penny continued to be issued until 1860.

By the late 1850s, the state of the copper coinage was deemed unsatisfactory, with quantities of worn oversized pieces, some dating from Boulton's day, still circulating. They were replaced by lighter bronze coins beginning in 1860; the "Bun penny", named for the hairstyle of Queen Victoria on it, was issued from then until 1894. The final years of Victoria's reign saw the "Veiled head" or "Old head" pennies, which were coined from 1895 until her death in 1901.

== Silver penny (18th century) ==
At the start of the reign of George I, in 1714, the English penny had been struck from silver for about a thousand years. The Hanoverian dynasty in Britain began during the time that Sir Isaac Newton was Master of the Mint. Newton had in 1702 considered the issuance of a copper penny, but no action was taken. Silver at this time came to the Royal Mint only as the by-product of mining for other substances, and from chance deposits and windfalls—the scandal-plagued South Sea Company in 1723 was obliged to send a large quantity of silver bullion to the Mint's premises in the Tower of London. Nevertheless, so little was sent overall that MP John Conduitt, Newton's successor as Master, wrote in 1730 that since December 1701, "no silver has been imported to the Mint but what was forced thither". Only small quantities of silver pennies were struck in the early years of George's reign; it and the silver twopence were unpopular in any case because of their small size.

The change in dynasty did not affect the form of the silver penny—a 12 mm diameter coin weighing 0.5 gram. George's pennies had the inscription GEORGIVS DEI GRA continuing onto the other side with MAG BR FR ET HIB REX (Note: Georgius Dei Gratia/Magnae Britanniae Franciae et Hiberniae Rex, or George by the Grace of God/King of Great Britain, France and Ireland. The British throne's claim to France was at this point purely historic.) and the date, around the crowned "I". The representation of George was by John Croker or his assistant Samuel Bull; they had designed the busts of William III and of Queen Anne that had appeared on earlier pennies. The Roman numeral I on the coins dated from the reign of James II, and was at first intended to denote the King's initial in Latin (IACOBUS) but was kept a Roman numeral when the twopence, threepence, and fourpence were given Arabic numerals under William III and Mary. Pennies were minted in 1716, 1718, 1720, 1723, 1725, 1726 and 1727, the last of these the date of George's death and of the accession of his son, George II.

The major purpose for the silver penny in the 18th century was as Maundy money. Most silver pennies after 1727 were likely used for that purpose; the mintages were enough to provide for this, but not enough for general circulation. In some years, the Maundy money may have been composed entirely of pennies, though there are accounts of the twopence, threepence, and groat being used as well. At times, there were gaps in the dating as enough for several years was struck at once, to be held against need. There were enough silver pennies in circulation that Maundy recipients could spend their gifts. By 1727, the price of silver guaranteed that pennies were struck at a loss. When other regal coins began use of a bust showing George II as an older man in 1740–1743, the penny remained unaltered. Brian Robinson, in his book on the Royal Maundy, suggested that a new bust for a coin issued only in small quantities would not have been worth the 12 weeks' work it would have taken a Mint engraver to create new dies. In any event, between 1727 and 1816, silver cost too much for there to be much coinage of it. George II's pennies had a left-facing bust of him and the inscription GEORGIVS II DEI GRATIA continuing onto the other side with MAG BRI FR ET HIB REX (Note: Georgius II Dei Gratia/Magnae Britanniae Franciae et Hiberniae Rex, or George II by the Grace of God/King of Great Britain, France and Ireland) and the date around the crowned "I". Pennies were minted in 1729, 1731, 1732, 1735, 1737, 1739, 1740, 1743, 1746 and 1750, and between 1752 and 1760. No pennies were issued dated 1733 or 1744, likely because the year in Britain still began on 25 March, and Maundy Thursday did not occur during those twelve-month periods.

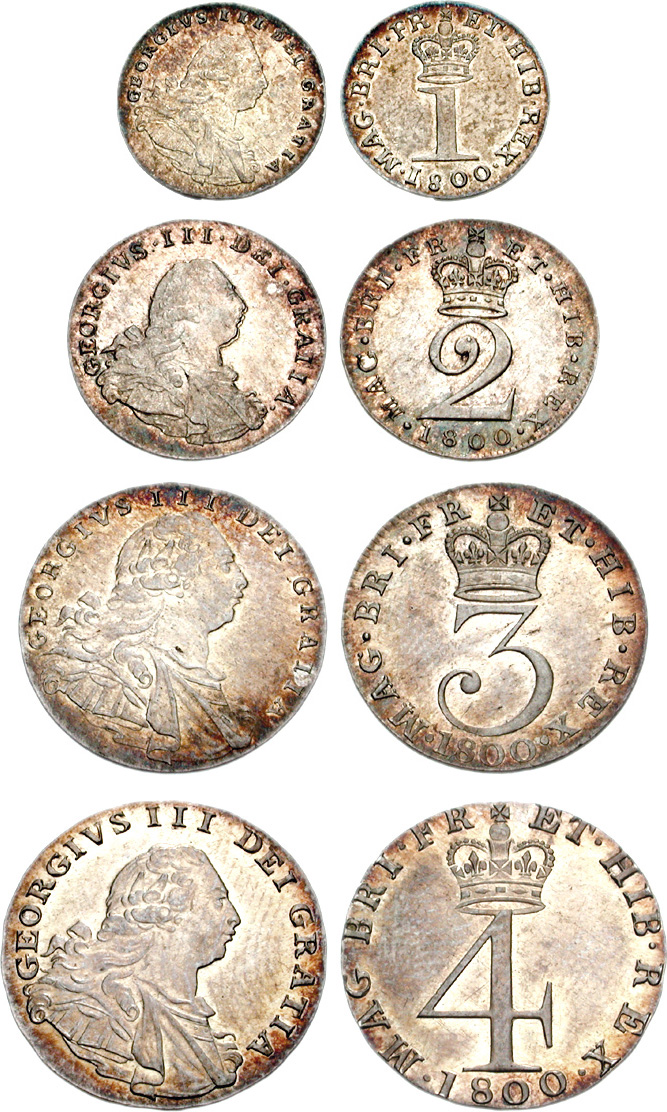
Set of Maundy money dated 1800, including the silver penny (top)

Into the reign of King George III (1760–1820), the silver penny continued to be used mostly as a Maundy piece. Pennies similar to those of previous reigns, but bearing George III's head and the inscription GEORGIVS III DEI GRATIA, (Note: George III by the Grace of God ...) were struck in 1763, 1766, 1770, 1772, 1776, 1779, 1780, 1781, 1784 and 1786. A new bust of the King was introduced to the penny in 1792, and was struck dated that year, 1795, and 1800. The third, laureated bust of the king with an unchanged obverse inscription was on the silver penny in 1817, 1818 and 1820. George III's first reverse, used until 1780, showed the crowned "I" in high relief, with the inscription MAG BRI FR ET HIB REX. (Note: ... Magnae Britanniae Franciae et Hiberniae Rex, or King of Great Britain, France and Ireland) A modification was made in 1781, with the relief of the central "I" on the reverse lowered, likely because part of the outline of the I had been visible on the King's head on the other side of the coin. This second reverse, used until 1786, was similar but in lower relief, the "I" being much flatter; the third reverse, used in 1792 only, was completely redesigned with a much smaller "I" under a smaller crown with the inscription running around the crown, with the same legend as before. The fourth reverse, used in 1795 and 1800 was similar to the first but with a redesigned crown. The fifth reverse, used from 1817, showed the crowned "I" with the inscription BRITANNIARUM REX FID DEF (Note: Britanniarum Rex Fidei Defensor, or ... King of the British Territories, Defender of the Faith) and the date. From 1817, the diameter of the coin was reduced from 12 to 11 millimetres, although the weight remained the same at .5 grams.

== Copper penny (1797–1860) ==
=== Soho issues (1797–1807) ===
With little silver coined in the second half of the 18th century, the burden of small change fell on the copper coinage, of which the highest denomination before 1797 was the halfpenny. Many official halfpennies were melted down clandestinely and lightweight counterfeits were made with the copper. In 1787, the Mint found that at most eight percent of "halfpennies" in circulation were genuine. A withdrawal of the existing copper coinage was deemed impractical due to transport difficulties. The Government would not accept copper coinage for taxes, and the small merchants who accumulated large stocks of real and dubious copper coin sought relief. Areas of the country not near the capital were sometimes short of coppers, since new issues could only be purchased at the Mint's office at the Tower of London, in packets of 5 or 10 shillings. The small change shortage made it difficult, by the late 1780s, for employers to pay workers.

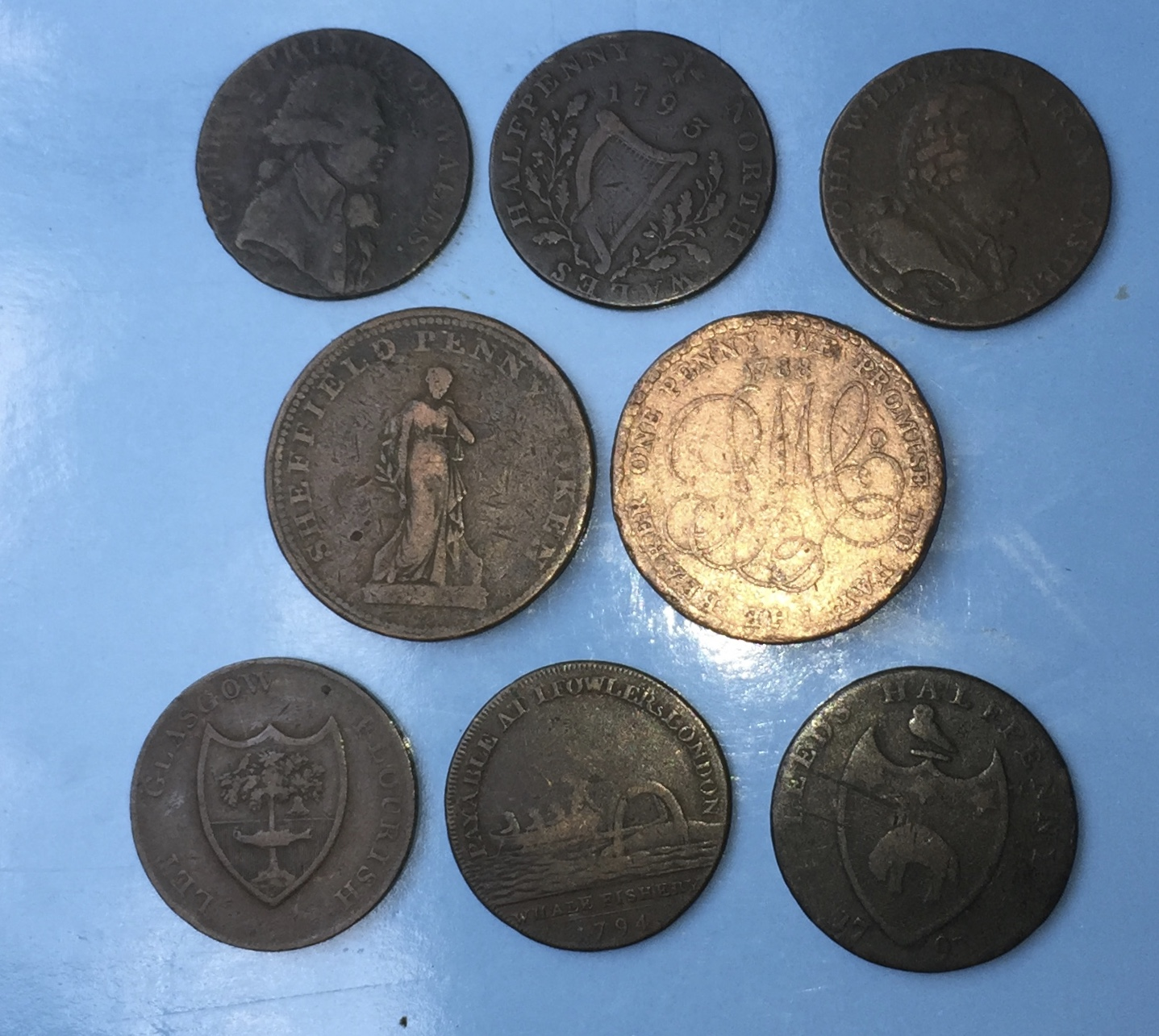
These penny (centre) and halfpenny tokens circulated during the coinage emergencies of the late 18th and early 19th century.

The gap was filled, beginning in 1787, by private minters and companies, who issued copper halfpenny and penny tokens. Although not money in a legal sense, they served that purpose, and rapidly spread across the country. Many of the manufacturers of these tokens were found in Birmingham, where industrialist Matthew Boulton struck large numbers of tokens and also constructed the Soho Mint, the first to be powered by steam. He aggressively lobbied for a contract to strike official copper coins. In 1797, the government gave Boulton a contract to strike 480 tonnes of copper pennies and 20 tonnes of copper twopences. The first official British coins of those denominations to be made of copper, they were also the first official British coins to be struck by steam rather than by muscle power.

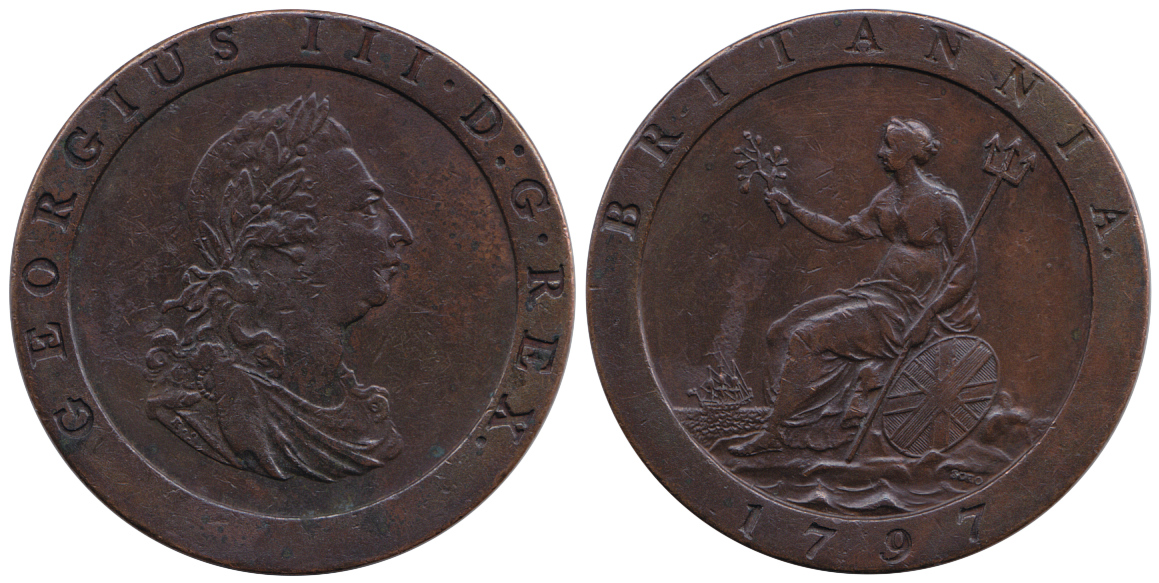
Matthew Boulton's 1797 penny struck at the Soho Mint

The large size of the coins, combined with the thick rim where the inscription was incuse (i.e. punched into the metal rather than raised from it), led to the coins being nicknamed "cartwheels". The design was by Boulton's employee Conrad Küchler. The obverse of the cartwheel coinage is a laureated right-facing bust of George III, with the inscription GEORGIUS III D G REX, (Note: Georgius III Dei Gratia Rex, or George III, by the Grace of God King) while the reverse showed Britannia seated on a rock, facing left, holding an olive branch and trident with the inscription BRITANNIA 1797. Although Britannia had long appeared on the halfpenny and farthing, the 1797 coinage was the first time she was depicted ruling the waves, an allegory for Britain's status as a maritime power. The word SOHO may be seen in fine print on the face of the rock just below the shield. Boulton's pennies and twopences were meant to contain their face value in copper, i.e. they weighed one and two ounces each (penny – 28.3 grams, diameter 36 millimetres). In English measure, the penny was just over 1.4 inches in diameter, so that 17 pennies side by side would measure two feet. Boulton obtained a copy of the Royal Society's standard foot to get the measurement right. Even though pennies were struck first, reserving the twopences for later, the existing Soho Mint had trouble stamping such large pieces of copper, and Boulton built a new mint at Soho, where by 1799, each press was striking 60 pennies a minute. The 1,250 tonnes of "cartwheels" struck at Soho between 1797 and 1799 (all pieces were dated 1797) exceeded the total copper coinage by the Royal Mint in the 18th century.

Boulton was given a further contract in 1799, but only halfpennies and farthings were struck then. In 1805, Boulton gained another contract. By then, the price of copper had risen; in 1797, a pound of copper had coined 16 pence of coins, and in 1799 that amount of metal had made 18 pence-worth, but it took 24 of the 1806 pennies to weigh a pound. The pennies were issued dated 1806 or 1807; they weigh 18.9 grams (2/3 ounces) and measure 34 millimetres (one-and-a-third inches) in diameter. These were more conventionally designed, also by Küchler, with a right-facing bust of the King and the same inscription as on the obverse of 1797 pennies. The reverse shows the seated Britannia facing left, with olive branch and trident and the inscription BRITANNIA. There is one unique penny coin known which is dated 1808, but this is thought to have been a proof. A total of 150 tonnes of copper were used to make the 1806 and 1807 pennies.

=== Regal issues (1825–1860) ===
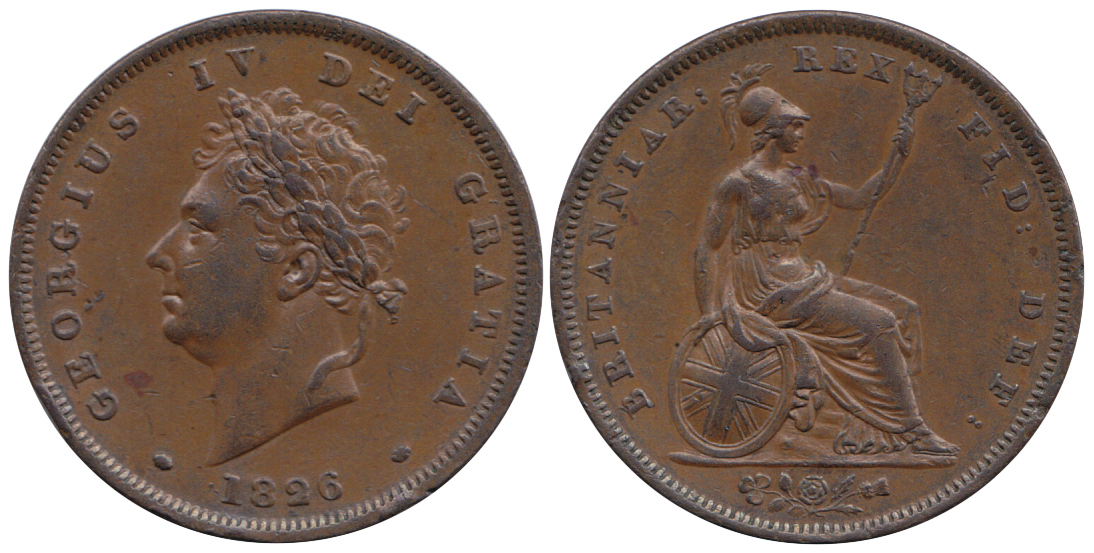
Penny of George IV, 1826.

Finding its premises at the Tower of London too cramped and unsuited to the new technology, the Mint moved to a new building on Tower Hill, and first struck coins there (for the East India Company) in 1811. The coinage was made by steam power, with equipment supplied by Boulton's firm. At the beginning of the Great Recoinage of 1816, only gold and silver coins were produced; the Chancellor of the Exchequer, Nicholas Vansittart, deemed there to be enough official coppers in commerce to serve. Thus, it was not until after the death of George III in 1820 and the accession of his son George IV that the copper coinage was recommenced. Coinage of pennies and halfpennies resumed in 1825 after the first farthings of the new reign were minted in 1821. The new pennies were authorised by an Order in Council of 14 November 1825, and were made current by a proclamation of 30 January 1826. George IV's pennies were struck in only three years (1825, 1826, 1827) and most of the final year's mintage is believed to have been sent to Tasmania.

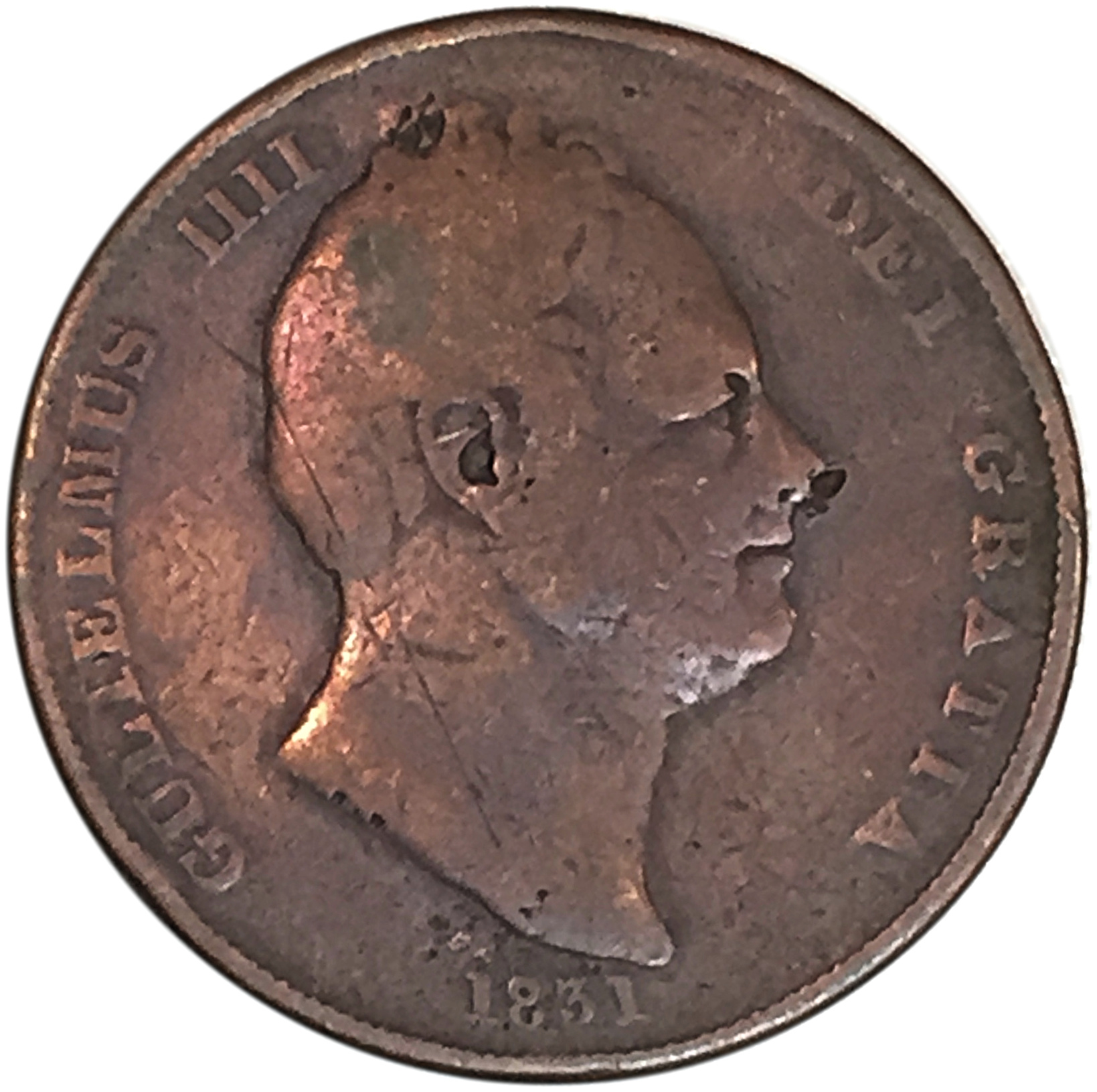
1831 William IV penny

The obverse of George IV's pennies shows a left-facing laureated head engraved by William Wyon. This was the second portrait of George IV, and was adopted after the King expressed a dislike for the one engraved by Benedetto Pistrucci, which was never used on the penny. The penny is inscribed GEORGIUS IV DEI GRATIA (Note: George IV by the Grace of God ...) and the date, while the reverse shows a right-facing seated Britannia with a shield and trident, inscribed BRITANNIAR REX FID DEF. (Note: ... Britanniar Rex Fidei Defensor, or King of the British Territories, Defender of the Faith) The penny at this time weighed 18.8 grams and had a diameter of 34 millimetres, the same as Boulton's 1806–1807 pennies.

The pennies of King William IV (1830–1837) are similar to those of his predecessor, also being engraved by William Wyon, based on a model by Sir Francis Chantrey. King William's head faces right, with the obverse inscribed GULIELMUS IIII DEI GRATIA, (Note: William IV by the Grace of God ...) while the reverse is identical to the George IV penny. Pennies were minted in 1831, 1834 and 1837. An 1836 penny has been reported but not confirmed.

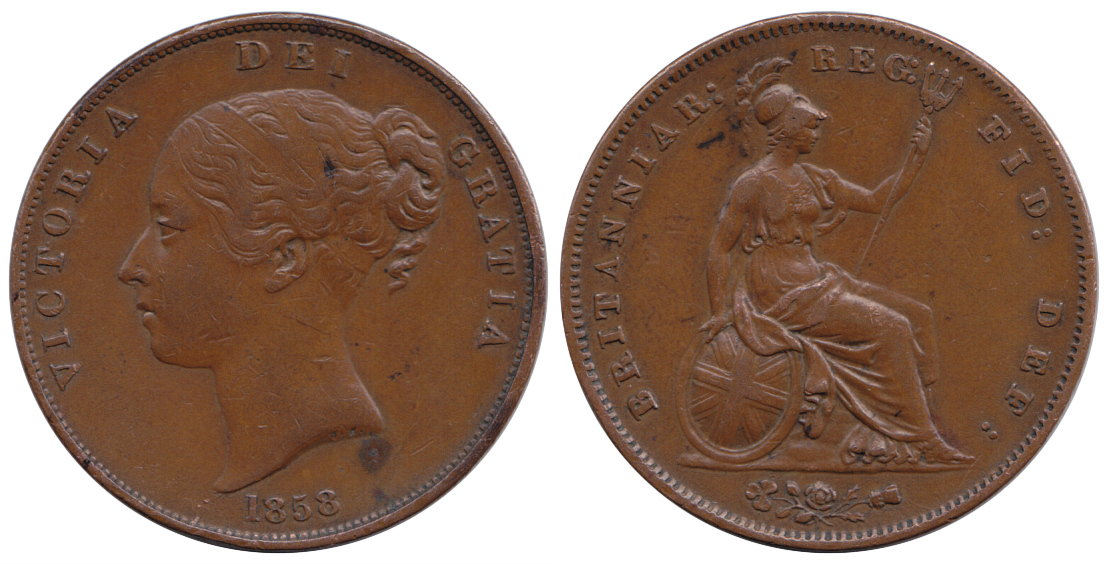
Penny of Queen Victoria, 1858. The "Young Head".

The pennies of Queen Victoria (1837–1901) form one of the most intricate denominations of British coinage, both before and after the transition from copper to bronze pennies in 1860. A number of specialist books have been published on the many varieties of Victorian pennies. The final years of the copper penny, from 1839 to 1860, saw a portrait of the Queen by William Wyon, usually dubbed the "Young Head". It had a reverse largely unchanged from King William's but for changing an X to a G, thus REX became REG, short for Regina (queen), denoting the fact that the monarch was now a woman. Thus, the legend on Victorian copper pennies was VICTORIA DEI GRATIA/BRITANNIAR REG FID DEF. (Note: Victoria Dei Gratia/Britanniar Regina Fidei Defensor, or Victoria, by the Grace of God/Queen of the British Territories, Defender of the Faith) Copper pennies were issued for all years between 1839 and 1860 except 1840, 1842, 1850, and 1852. The Heaton Mint, of Birmingham, had been founded with equipment from the wound-up Soho Mint. Beginning in the early 1850s, it supplied large quantities of blanks for pennies to the Royal Mint, and at times was called upon to strike pennies, though its mint mark H would not appear on pennies until 1874. These contracts were because of the needs of Ireland (where counterfeits and tokens were common) and the colonies; the large quantities struck between 1797 and 1807 by Boulton ensured there were no shortages in England, Scotland and Wales.

== Bronze penny (from 1860) ==
By 1857, both the Royal Mint and the public were dissatisfied by the state of the copper coinage. Much of it was worn or defaced by advertisements, and 14 percent of the pennies in commerce were Boulton's 1797 cartwheels. The fact that pennies of different specifications circulated side by side precluded the weighing of quantities of copper coin to ascertain the value. In addition to the pennies struck since 1806, there were Boulton's 1797 coppers and also, to a different standard, coppers struck for Ireland, which had been legal tender since 1826. Each sort of penny was deemed too heavy for daily use. The copper coins were so heavy that Charles Dickens in Nicholas Nickleby had Mr Mantalini contemplate suicide by drowning himself in the Thames, his pockets filled with halfpennies.

Thomas Graham, the Master of the Mint, in 1859 persuaded William Gladstone, the Chancellor of the Exchequer, that the state of the copper currency demanded a lighter, more durable replacement. Bronze was selected as harder and less subject to oxidation. It was a material with which the Mint had experience, having recently struck bronze coins for the Canadian colonies, and it had been used in France since 1852. Gladstone told the House of Commons that were an old and a new penny placed side by side, no one unacquainted with them would dream they represented the same value. Parliament passed legislation in 1860 that allowed the penny to be struck from an alloy of metals. The act required that Britannia appear on the coin, as the design was felt to symbolise Britain as ruler of the waves, and to omit her would be seen as abandoning that role. The Mint in 1860 awarded a contract for 1,720 tonnes of bronze pennies, halfpennies and farthings to James Watt & Co of Birmingham, a contract that would not be completed until 1863. Heaton's was also called upon to supply dies and coins, especially as Watt's prepared to execute its huge contract.

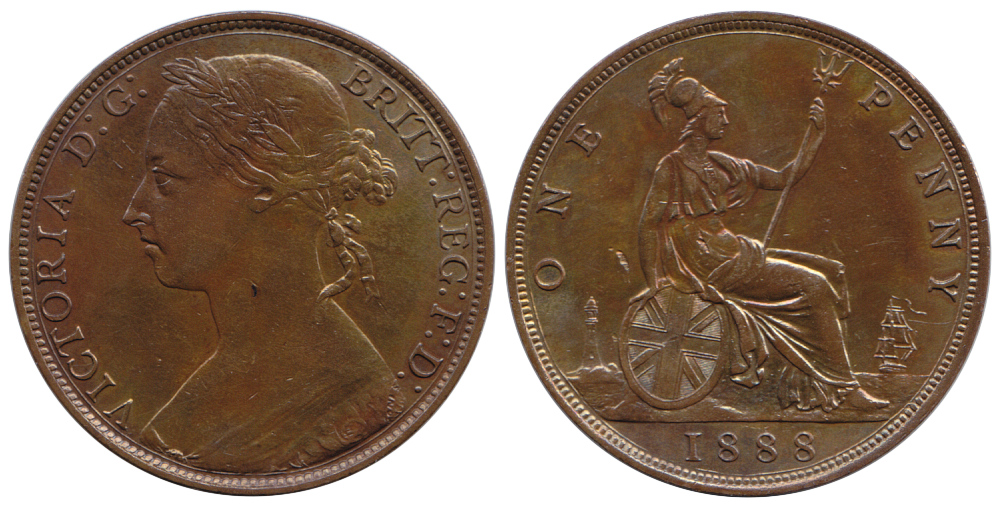
The 'Bun Head' penny

Although there were calls for a public competition, William Wyon's son, Leonard Charles Wyon was chosen to execute the new design. Both the Queen and Prince Albert took a keen interest in the work, and repeated visits by Wyon to Buckingham Palace and Osborne House were necessary before Victoria gave her approval. There is a tale that the Queen returned the penny sent her for final approval by post, but a postman opened the parcel, throwing away the coin in disgust when he realised all that was inside was a penny. The new bronze pieces were made current by a proclamation dated 17 December 1860, and public reaction was positive, both for Wyon's designs and for the weight, which had been halved. The new coins were widely distributed through post offices, and in 1861, the Mint began the recall of the old copper pieces, paying a small premium and for the transport. The old copper coins soon vanished from towns; progress in rural areas was more gradual. The pre-1860 copper penny was demonetised after 1869 in Britain (though accepted at full face value by the Mint until 1873) and in 1877 for the colonies—roughly a quarter of the copper coinage struck by the Royal Mint between 1821 and 1856 had been sent overseas, with Ceylon the leading recipient.

The obverse of the new penny read VICTORIA D G BRITT REG F D. (Note: Victoria Dei Gratia Britanniarum Regina Fidei Defensor, or Victoria by the Grace of God Queen of the Britains, Defender of the Faith) The Mint had intended to render it with the abbreviation BRIT, and some after the coins' release argued it should have done, but Gladstone had intervened to invoke the rule that the last consonant of a Latin abbreviation should be doubled to indicate the plural. The coin is dubbed the "Bun Head penny" or "Bun penny" for the Queen's hairstyle. The reverse depicts Britannia, wearing flowing robes, a breastplate and helmet, and grasping a trident. Her right hand grips a shield, on which is seen the combined crosses of the Union Jack. A ship sails out to sea on her right, and a lighthouse, supposedly the old Eddystone Lighthouse, is seen behind her on her left. The denomination, ONE PENNY, appears for the first time on the base-metal piece.

There are many varieties of the Bun penny, as several non-identical dies were prepared (especially in 1860) the design was tweaked a number of times over its 35 years, and the dies were sometimes used in different combinations. The 2017 edition of Spink & Son's Coins of England & the United Kingdom chronicles 13 obverses, 14 reverses and a large number of die combinations. Differences include the number of leaves on Victoria's wreath and whether the border is beaded or toothed. An "H" below the date on 1874, 1875, 1876, 1881 and 1882 pennies indicates that the coin was produced at Heaton's in Birmingham. When production at the Royal Mint was stopped for a complete reconstruction in 1882, Heaton's, pursuant to contract, produced 50 tonnes of pennies, halfpennies and farthings. Pennies of the Bun type were issued in all years between 1860 and 1894.

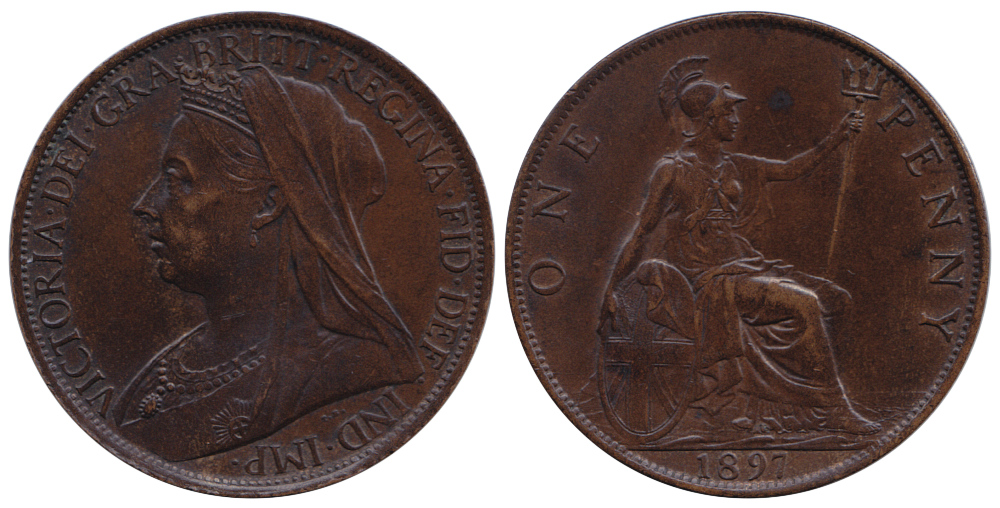
Thomas Brock's "Old head" penny of Victoria

Joseph Edgar Boehm's "Jubilee head" of the Queen was placed on the gold and silver coinage in 1887 but was not adopted for the bronze, with the Bun head continuing. Boehm's rendering proved unpopular, and in 1893 was replaced with the "Veiled head" or "Old head", by Thomas Brock, and engraved by Chief Engraver of the Royal Mint George William de Saulles. The new penny design was introduced in 1895, the new version being authorised by a proclamation dated 11 May of that year. Victoria is seen as an elderly woman, wearing a diadem partially eclipsed by a veil. She wears a necklace with a pendant, an earring, and the Garter Riband with Star. The inscription became VICTORIA DEI GRA BRITT REGINA FID DEF IND IMP, (Note: Victoria Dei Gratia Britanniarum Regina Fidei Defensor Indiae Imperatrix, or Victoria, by the Grace of God Queen of the Britains, Defender of the Faith, Empress of India) as the title of Empress of India had been added to the Queen's titles in 1876. The reverse was modified by de Saulles, with the most significant change the deletion of the ship and lighthouse. The new design was struck each year from 1895 to 1901, the year in which Victoria died. Coins depicting her and dated 1901 continued to be struck until King Edward VII's coinage was ready in May 1902.

== Mintages ==
Total mintage by date and mint mark. "H" is for Heaton Mint, Birmingham.

=== George III (1797–1808) ===
Laureate Bust ("Cartwheel penny")

- 1797 ~ 43,969,204

Laureate Bust

- 1806 ~ 19,355,480
- 1807 ~ 11,290,168
- 1808 ~ 1 (proof only)

=== King George IV 1820–1830 ===
Laureate Bust

- 1825 ~ 1,075,200
- 1826 ~ 5,913,000
- 1827 ~ 1,451,520

=== King William IV 1830–1837 ===
Laureate Bust

- 1831 ~ 806,400
- 1834 ~ 322,560
- 1837 ~ 174,720

=== Queen Victoria 1837–1901 ===
Copper:

Young Bust (W.W. on truncation)

- 1839 ~ 300 est. (proof only)
- 1841 ~ 913,920
- 1843 ~ 483,830
- 1844 ~ 215,040
- 1845 ~ 322,560
- 1846 ~ 483,840
- 1847 ~ 430,080
- 1848 ~ 161,280
- 1849 ~ 268,800
- 1851 ~ 432,224
- 1853 ~ 1,021,440
- 1854 ~ 6,720,000
- 1855 ~ 5,273,866
- 1856 ~ 1,212,288
- 1857 ~ 752,640

Young Bust

- 1858 ~ 1,559,040
- 1859 ~ 1,075,200
- 1860 ~ 32,256

Bronze:

Laureate and Draped Bust – 'L.C.Wyon' (Beaded border)

- 1860 ~ 5,053,440

Laureate and Draped Bust – 'L.C.Wyon' (Toothed border)

- 1860 ~ Unknown
- 1861 ~ 36,449,280

Laureate and Draped Bust (Toothed border)

- 1861 ~ Unknown
- 1862 ~ 50,534,400
- 1863 ~ 28,062,700
- 1864 ~ 3,440,640
- 1865 ~ 8,601,600
- 1866 ~ 9,999,360
- 1867 ~ 5,483,520
- 1868 ~ 1,182,720
- 1869 ~ 2,580,480
- 1870 ~ 5,695,022
- 1871 ~ 1,290,318
- 1872 ~ 8,494,572
- 1873 ~ 8,494,200
- 1874 ~ 5,621,865
- 1874H ~ 6,666,240
- 1875 ~ 10,691,040
- 1875H ~ 752,640
- 1876H ~ 11,074,560
- 1877 ~ 9,624,747
- 1878 ~ 2,764,470
- 1879 ~ 7,666,476
- 1880 ~ 3,000,831
- 1881 ~ 2,302,362
- 1881H ~ 3,763,200
- 1882H ~ 7,526,400
- 1883 ~ 6,327,438
- 1884 ~ 11,702,802
- 1885 ~ 7,145,862
- 1886 ~ 6,087,759
- 1887 ~ 5,315,085
- 1888 ~ 5,125,020
- 1889 ~ 12,559,737
- 1890 ~ 15,330,840
- 1891 ~ 17,885,961
- 1892 ~ 10,501,671
- 1893 ~ 8,161,737
- 1894 ~ 3,883,452

Veiled Bust

- 1895 ~ 5,395,830
- 1896 ~ 24,147,156
- 1897 ~ 20,752,620
- 1898 ~ 14,296,836
- 1899 ~ 26,441,069
- 1900 ~ 31,778,109
- 1901 ~ 22,205,568

== See also ==
- 1844 Victoria One Penny Model
