= Penny (British pre-decimal coin) =

Former denomination of sterling coinage

One penny
- United Kingdom
- Value: 1d (equivalent to 5/12 of a new penny)
- Mass: (Bronze) 9.4 g
- Diameter: (Bronze) 31 mm
- Edge: Plain
- Composition: (1707–1796) Silver; (1797–1859) Copper; (1860–1967; 1970 (Note: In proof sets only)) Bronze
- Years of minting: 1707–1967; 1970 (In proof sets only)

Obverse
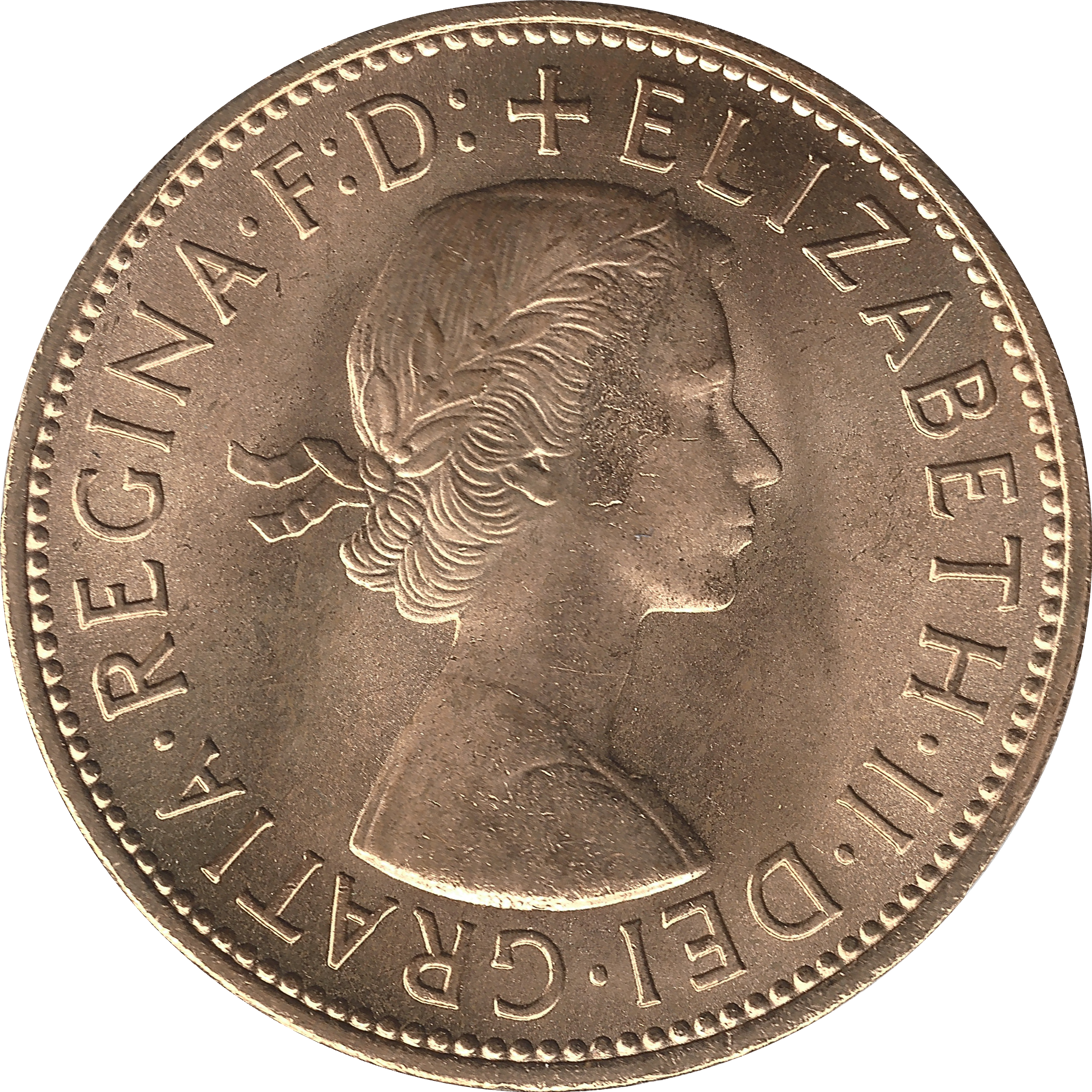
- Design: Profile of the monarch (Elizabeth II design shown)

Reverse
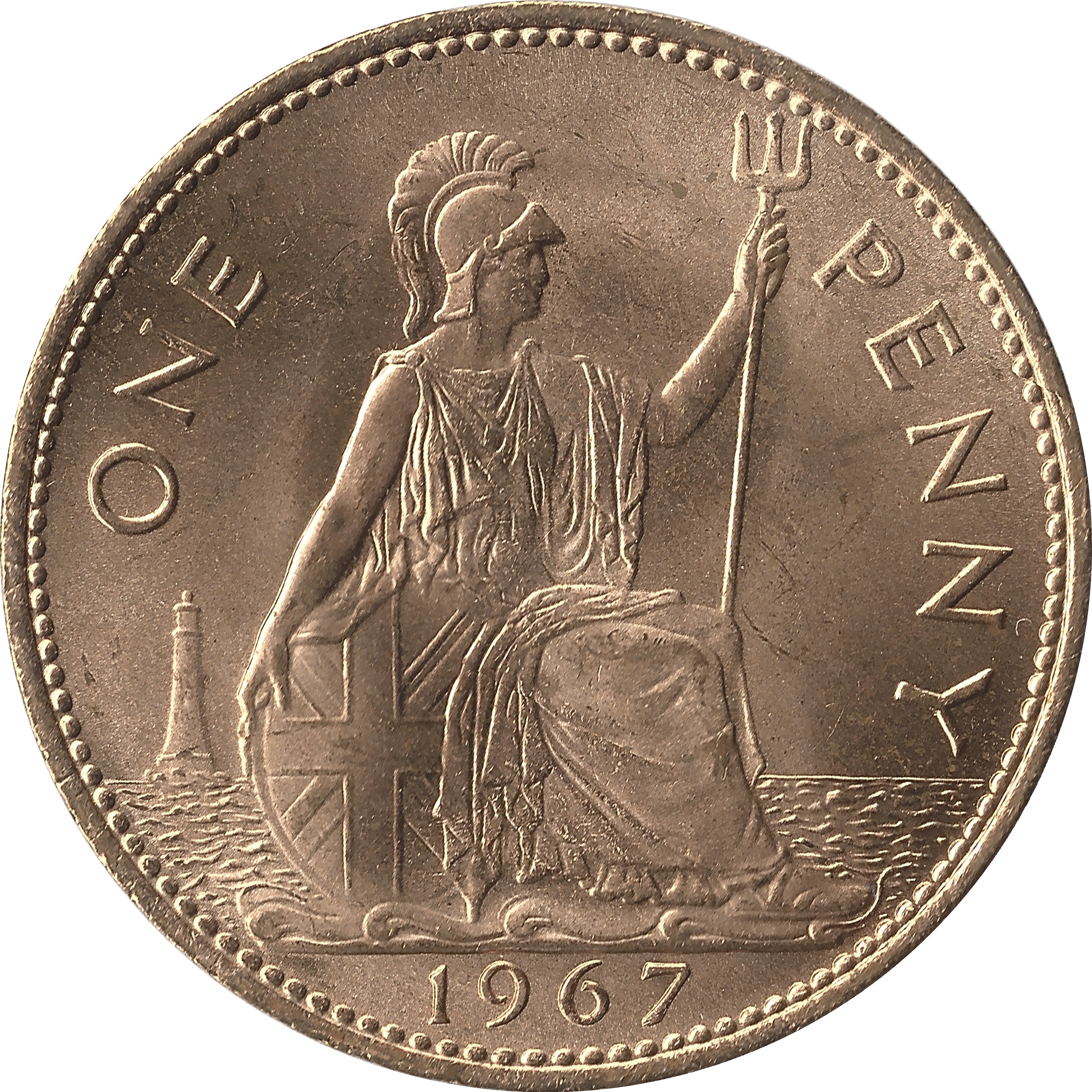
- Design: Britannia
- Designer: Leonard Charles Wyon
- Design date: 1936

The British pre-decimal penny was a denomination of sterling coinage worth 1/240 of one pound (in new notation: ~£0.0042 or 5/12 of a new penny) or 1/12 of one shilling. Its symbol was d, from the Roman denarius coin. It was a continuation of the earlier English penny, and in Scotland it had the same monetary value as one pre-1707 Scottish shilling, thus the English penny was called sgillin in Scottish Gaelic. The penny was originally minted in silver, but from the late 18th century it was minted in copper, and then after 1860 in bronze.

The plural of "penny" is "pence" (often added as an unstressed suffix) when referring to an amount of money, and "pennies" when referring to a number of coins. Thus 8d is eightpence or eight pence, but "eight pennies" means specifically eight individual penny coins.

Before Decimal Day in 1971, sterling used the Carolingian monetary system (£sd), under which the largest unit was a pound (£) divisible into 20 shillings (s), each of 12 pence (d).

The pre-decimal penny was demonetised on 1 September 1971, just over six months after decimalisation, and replaced (in effect) by the decimal half new penny, with 1/2p being worth 1.2d.

== History ==
The kingdoms of England and Scotland were merged by the 1707 Act of Union, to form the Kingdom of Great Britain. The exchange rate between £1 Scots and £1 sterling had been fixed at 12:1 since the Union of the Crowns in 1603, and in 1707 Scots currency ceased to be legal tender, with sterling to be used throughout Great Britain. The penny replaced the Scots shilling.

The design and specifications of the sterling penny were unchanged by unification, and it continued to be minted in silver after 1707. Queen Anne's reign saw pennies minted in 1708, 1709, 1710 and 1713. These issues, however, were not for general circulation, instead being minted as Maundy money. The prohibitive cost of minting silver coins had meant the size of pennies had been reduced over the years, with the minting of silver pennies for general circulation being halted in 1660.

The practice of minting pennies only for Maundy money continued through the reigns of George I and George II, and into that of George III. However, by George III's reign there was a shortage of pennies such that a great many merchants and mining companies issued their own copper tokens e.g. the Parys Mining Company on Anglesey issued huge numbers of tokens (although their acceptability was strictly limited).

In 1797, the government authorised Matthew Boulton to strike copper pennies and twopences at his Soho Mint in Birmingham. At the time it was believed that the face value of a coin should correspond to the value of the material it was made from, so they had respectively to contain one or two pence worth of copper (for a penny this worked out to be one ounce of copper). This requirement meant that the coins would be significantly larger than the silver pennies minted previously. The large size of the coins, combined with the thick rim where the inscription was incuse i.e. punched into the metal rather than standing proud of it, led to the coins being nicknamed "cartwheels". These pennies were minted over the course of several years, but all are marked with the date 1797.

=== 19th century ===
By 1802, the production of privately issued provincial tokens had ceased. However, in the next ten years the intrinsic value of copper rose. The return of privately minted token coinage was evident by 1811 and endemic by 1812, as more and more of the government-issued copper coinage was melted down. The Royal Mint undertook a massive recoinage programme in 1816, with large quantities of gold and silver coinage being minted. To thwart the further issuance of private token coinage, in 1817 an Act of Parliament was passed which forbade the manufacture of private token coinage under very severe penalties. Copper coins continued to be minted after 1797, through the reigns of George III, George IV and William IV, and the early reign of Queen Victoria. These later coins were smaller than the cartwheel pennies of 1797, and contained a smaller amount of copper.

In 1857, a survey by the Royal Mint found that around one third of all copper coinage was worn or mutilated, often by advertisements. Two years later, Thomas Graham, the Master of the Mint, convinced William Ewart Gladstone, then Chancellor of the Exchequer, that so large a part of the copper coinage must be taken out of circulation that it was worth introducing a whole new coinage which would be "much more convenient and agreeable in use". These new coins were minted in bronze, and their specifications were no longer constrained by the onerous requirement that their face value should match the value of the base metal used to make the coin. They were introduced in 1860 and a year later the withdrawal of the old copper coinage began.

=== 20th century ===
The specification of the bronze version of the penny was that it should have a mass of 145.83333 grains or 9.44984 grams (about 1/3 of an ounce; the Coinage Act 1870 specifies the mass in grains and grams to five decimal places).. Pennies were minted every year of Queen Victoria's reign, and every year of Edward VII's reign. George V pennies were produced every year to the same standard until 1922, but after a three-year gap in production, the alloy composition was changed to 95.5% copper, 3% tin and 1.5% zinc, although the weight and size remained unchanged (which was necessary because of the existence by then of large numbers of coin-operated amusement machines and public telephones). Thereafter, pennies were minted every year for the remainder of George V's reign, although only six or seven 1933 coins were minted, specifically for the king to lay under the foundation stones of new buildings; one of these coins was stolen when a church in Leeds was demolished in the 1960s, and its whereabouts are unknown.

Although a few Edward VIII pennies dated 1937 exist, they are technically pattern coins – trial pieces created for design approval. That approval would have taken place around the time of the abdication of Edward VIII, so the coins never entered circulation.

Pennies were not minted every year of George VI's reign: None were minted in 1941, 1942 and 1943. Pennies minted in 1950 and 1951 were for overseas use only. One 1952 penny, believed to be unique, was struck by the Royal Mint.

The worldwide shortage of tin during the Second World War caused a change in the alloy in 1944 to 97% copper, 0.5% tin and 2.5% zinc, but this bronze tarnishes unattractively; the original 95.5% copper, 3% tin, 1.5% zinc alloy was restored in 1945.

Because of the large number of pennies in circulation there was no need to produce any more in the 1950s, however a large number of specimen sets were issued in 1953 for the coronation of Elizabeth II. At least one 1954 penny was struck, apparently for private internal purposes at the Royal Mint, but it was not until 1961 that there was a need for more pennies to be minted, and production continued each year until 1967, and afterwards (as pennies continued to be minted with the date 1967, until 1970). The 97% copper, 0.5% tin, 2.5% zinc alloy was used again for the 1960s pennies. Finally, there was an issue of proof quality coins dated 1970 produced to bid farewell to the denomination.

== Types and specifications ==
=== Silver ===
Minted	Image	Size	Weight	Material	Summary
1708–1713		12.0 mm	0.5 g	92.5% silver 7.5% copper	The original reverse of the British penny is the same as the reverse of the pre-1707 English penny, a crowned letter I, surrounded by the inscription MAG BRI FR ET HIB REG. The obverse features the left-facing portrait of Queen Anne, surrounded by the inscription ANNA DEI GRATIA.
1716–1727		12.0 mm	0.5 g	92.5% silver 7.5% copper	George I coins also have a crowned I on the reverse and busts on the obverse. George I pennies have GEORGIVS DEI GRA inscribed on the obverse and MAG BR FR ET HIB REX with the date on the reverse.
1729–1760		12.0 mm	0.5 g	92.5% silver 7.5% copper	The same design as George I pennies, George II pennies have GEORGIVS II DEI GRATIA inscribed on the obverse and MAG BRI FR ET HIB REX with the date on the reverse.
1763–1786		12.0 mm	0.5 g	92.5% silver 7.5% copper	First obverse, showing a right-facing bust of the king, with the inscription GEORGIVS III DEI GRATIA. The first reverse was used until 1780 and shows a crowned "I" in high relief, with the inscription MAG BRI FR ET HIB REX with the date across the crown. This was then modified in lower relief with the "I" being much flatter.
1792		12.0 mm	0.5 g	92.5% silver 7.5% copper	Second obverse, showing an older bust of the king and the same inscription, laureated bust of the king with the inscription GEORGIUS III DEI GRATIA date. This issue uses a third reverse design which is completely redesigned with a much smaller "I" under a smaller crown with the inscription running around the crown. No changes were made to the legend.
1795–1800		12.0 mm	0.5 g	92.5% silver 7.5% copper	Second obverse, showing an older bust of the king and the same inscription, laureated bust of the king with the inscription GEORGIUS III DEI GRATIA and the date. This issue uses a fourth reverse design which is similar to the one used between 1763 and 1780, but with a redesigned crown.
1817–1820		12.0 mm	0.5 g	92.5% silver 7.5% copper	The fifth reverse, used from 1817 onwards, shows the crowned "I" with the inscription BRITANNIARUM REX FID DEF and the date.

=== Copper ===
Minted	Image	Size	Weight	Material	Short summary
1797		36.0mm	28.3g	100% copper	The "cartwheel" penny was minted in copper, with a weight of 1 oz (28 g) and a diameter of 1.4 in (36 mm). The obverse features a right-facing portrait of George III, and incused into the rim are the words GEORGIUS III·D·G·REX. The initial "K" appears on the lowest fold of the drapery at the base of the effigy, indicating that the design is the work of the German engraver Conrad Heinrich Küchler. The reverse shows the left-facing seated figure of Britannia, with a trident held loosely in her left hand, and an olive branch in her outstretched right. There are waves about her feet, with a small ship to the left and a Union Jack shield below and to the right. Above, on the rim, is incused the word BRITANNIA, and on the rim below the image is incused the date 1797. The reverse was also designed by Kuchler. The word SOHO appears next to the shield, indicating that the coin came from the Soho Mint.
1806–1808		34.0mm	18.8g	100% copper	On the obverse, the head of King George III is turned to the right, the inscription GEORGIUS III D: G REX, while the reverse shows a left-facing seated Britannia with a shield and trident, inscribed BRITANNIAR REX FID DEF. Engraver Conrad Heinrich Küchler, Soho Mint.
1825–1827		34.0mm	18.8g	100% copper	The obverse of George IV's penny shows a highly regarded left-facing laureated head engraved by William Wyon after the king expressed a dislike for the one engraved by Benedetto Pistrucci for use on the farthing, inscribed GEORGIUS IV DEI GRATIA date, while the reverse shows a right-facing seated Britannia with a shield and trident, inscribed BRITANNIAR REX FID DEF.
1831–1837		34.0mm	18.6g	100% copper	The pennies of King William IV are very similar to his predecessors', also being engraved by William Wyon. The king's head faces right, inscribed GULIELMUS IIII DEI GRATIA with a date, while the reverse is identical to the George IV penny.
1841–1860		34.0mm	18.8g	100% copper	The Young Head bust of Victoria was designed by William Wyon who died in 1851.

=== Bronze ===
Minted	Image	Diameter	Weight	Material	Summary
1860–1894		31.0 mm	9.4 g	95% copper 4% tin 1% zinc	The second bust of Victoria was designed by Leonard Charles Wyon. The reverse of the bronze version of the coin features a seated Britannia, holding a trident, with the words ONE PENNY to either side.
1895–1901		31.0 mm	9.4 g	95% copper 4% tin 1% zinc	The third and final Old Head (or "veiled head") bust was designed by Thomas Brock. The lighthouse and ship flanking Britannia were removed.
1902–1910		31.0 mm	9.4 g	95% copper 4% tin 1% zinc	During the reign of King Edward VII, the sea level design around Britannia was altered to be higher.
1911–1922		31.0 mm	9.4 g	95% copper 4% tin 1% zinc	
1925–1936 (Note: King George V's bust was modified in 1927 to be smaller)		31.0 mm	9.4 g	95.5% copper 3% tin 1.5% zinc	
1937–1943		31.0 mm	9.4 g	95.5% copper 3% tin 1.5% zinc	During the reign of George VI, the lighthouse was restored on the reverse to the left of Britannia, and her shield was turned upright.
1944		31.0 mm	9.4 g	97% copper 0.5% tin 2.5% zinc	During the reign of George VI, the lighthouse was restored on the reverse to the left of Britannia, and her shield was turned upright.
1945–1952		31.0 mm	9.4 g	95.5% copper 3% tin 1.5% zinc	George VI issue coins feature the inscription GEORGIVS VI D G BR OMN REX F D IND IMP before 1949, and GEORGIVS VI D G BR OMN REX FIDEI DEF thereafter.
1953–1954		31.0 mm	9.4 g	95.5% copper 3% tin 1.5% zinc	Pennies were rarely minted during the early reign of Elizabeth II, but those minted for the coronation in 1953 feature the inscription ELIZABETH II DEI GRA BRITT OMN REGINA F D.
1961–1967; 1970 (Note: In proof sets only)		31.0 mm	9.4 g	97% copper 0.5% tin 2.5% zinc	The regular minting of pennies was resumed in 1961. Pennies minted after that date bear the inscription ELIZABETH II DEI GRATIA REGINA F D.

== Pennies by period ==
- The Anglo-Saxons (c. 600–1066)
- The early Normans and the Anarchy (1066–1154)
- The Plantagenets (1154–1485)
- The Tudors (1485–1603)
- The Stuarts and the Commonwealth (1603–1714)
- The Hanoverians (1714–1901)
- The 20th century pre-decimal (1901–1970)
- Decimal Day, 1971
- Post-decimalisation (1971–present)

== Mintages ==
=== George III ===
Year	Mintage
1797	43,969,204
1806	19,355,480
1807	11,290,168
1808	Not circulated (Note: The unique 1808 dated penny was struck as proof coinage.)

=== George IV ===
Year	Mintage
1825	1,075,200
1826	5,914,000
1827	1,452,000

=== William IV ===
Year	Mintage
1831 (Note: Two other varieties are known involving an "incuse on truncation")	806,000
1834	323,000
1837	175,000

=== Victoria ===
Year	Mintage (Note: Many of these coins have multiple varieties which are all included in the mintage totals)
Young head
1839	Not circulated (Note: An estimated 300 bronzed proofs were minted in 1839.)
1841	914,000
1843	484,000
1844	215,000
1845	323,000
1846	484,000
1847	430,000
1848	161,000
1849	269,000
1851	269,000
1853	1,021,000
1854	6,559,000
1855	5,274,000
1856	1,212,000
1857	753,000
1858	1,559,040
1859	1,075,000
1860 (Note: All of these coins have a "1860" over "1859" overdate.)	32,000
Draped bust
1860	5,053,000
1861	36,449,000
1862	50,534,000
1863	28,063,000
1864	3,441,000
1865	8,602,000
1866	9,999,000
1867	5,484,000
1868	1,183,000
1869	2,580,000
1870	5,695,000
1871	1,290,000
1872	8,495,000
1873	8,494,000
1874	5,622,000
1874H (Note: The mintage figures where "H" or "KN" follows the year relates to coins minted with that particular mint mark. "H" refers to the Heaton Mint, and "KN" to the King's Norton Mint, both of which were contracted to mint supplemental pennies on occasion.)	6,666,000
1875	10,691,000
1875H	753,000
1876H	11,075,000
1877	9,625,000
1878	2,764,000
1879	7,666,000
1880	3,001,000
1881	2,302,000
1881H	3,763,000
1882H	7,526,000
1883	6,237,000
1884	11,703,000
1885	7,146,000
1886	6,088,000
1887	5,315,000
1888	5,125,000
1889	12,560,000
1890	15,331,000
1891	17,886,000
1892	10,502,000
1893	8,162,000
1894	3,883,000
Veiled bust
1895	5,396,000
1896	24,147,000
1897	20,757,000
1898	14,297,000
1899	26,441,000
1900	31,778,000
1901	22,206,000

=== Edward VII ===
Year	Mintage
1902	26,977,000
1903	21,415,000
1904	12,913,000
1905	17,784,000
1906	37,990,000
1907	47,322,000
1908	31,506,000
1909	19,617,000
1910	29,549,000

=== George V ===
Year	Mintage
1911	23,079,000
1912	48,306,000
1912H	16,800,000
1913	65,497,000
1914	50,821,000
1915	47,311,000
1916	86,411,000
1917	107,905,000
1918	84,227,000
1918H	2,573,000
1918KN	—N/a
1919	113,761,000
1919H	4,526,000
1919KN	—N/a
1920	124,693,000
1921	129,717,999
1922	16,347,000
1926	4,499,000
1927	60,990,000
1928	50,178,000
1929	49,133,000
1930	29,098,000
1931	19,843,000
1932	8,278,000
1933	Not circulated (Note: Pennies dated 1933 were not intended for circulation as they were struck for "inclusion in year sets interred under the foundation stones of public buildings". Only 7 of these coins are now known, 2 of which are privately held.)
1934	13,966,000
1935	56,070,000
1936	154,296,000

=== George VI ===
Year	Mintage
1937	88,896,000
1938	121,560,000
1939	55,560,000
1940	42,284,000
1944	42,600,000
1945	79,531,000
1946	66,855,999
1947	52,220,000
1948	63,961,000
1949	14,324,000
1950	240,000
1951	120,000
1952	Not circulated (Note: The unique 1952 dated penny was struck as proof coinage.)

=== Elizabeth II ===
Year	Mintage
1953	1,308,000
1954	Not circulated (Note: The unique 1954 dated penny was struck for "internal Royal Mint purposes".)
1961	48,313,000
1962	143,309,000
1963	125,236,000
1964	153,294,000
1965	121,310,000
1966	165,739,000
1967	654,564,000
1970 (Proof)	750,000

== See also ==
- Penny (British decimal coin)
- Penny (English coin)
- Farthing (British coin)
