= Conrad Heinrich Küchler =

German medalist

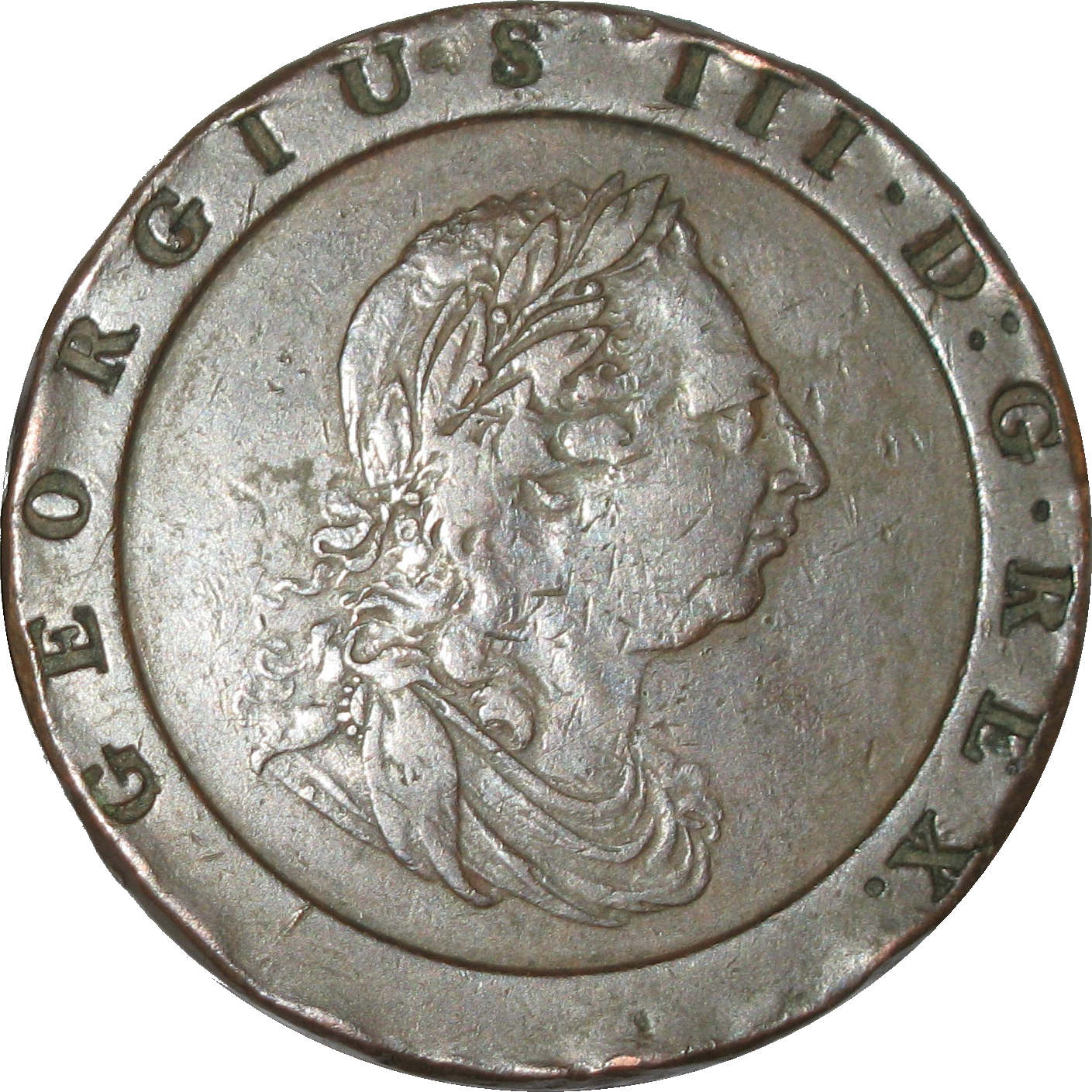
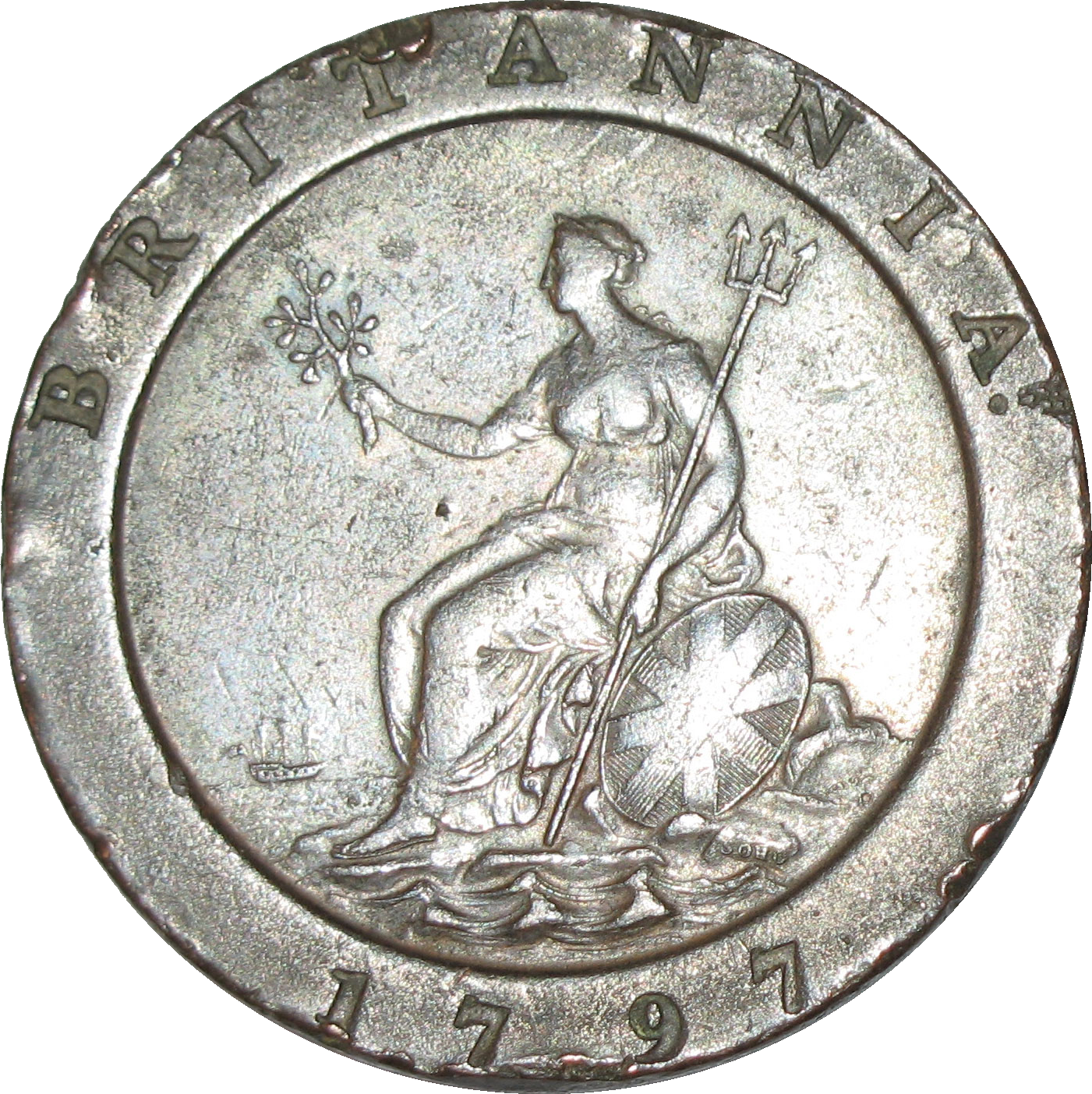
Obverse and reverse of the 1797 "cartwheel" twopence designed by Küchler.

Conrad Heinrich Küchler (c. 1740 – 1810) was a German medalist who from 1793 until his death worked as a designer of coinage and medals for the manufacturer and mint owner Matthew Boulton.

== Career ==
Küchler was born in Flanders around 1740, and apparently worked at first in Germany as a die-sinker at Darmstadt in 1763–1772, at Mannheim in 1766, at Frankfurt in 1775, and then in France.

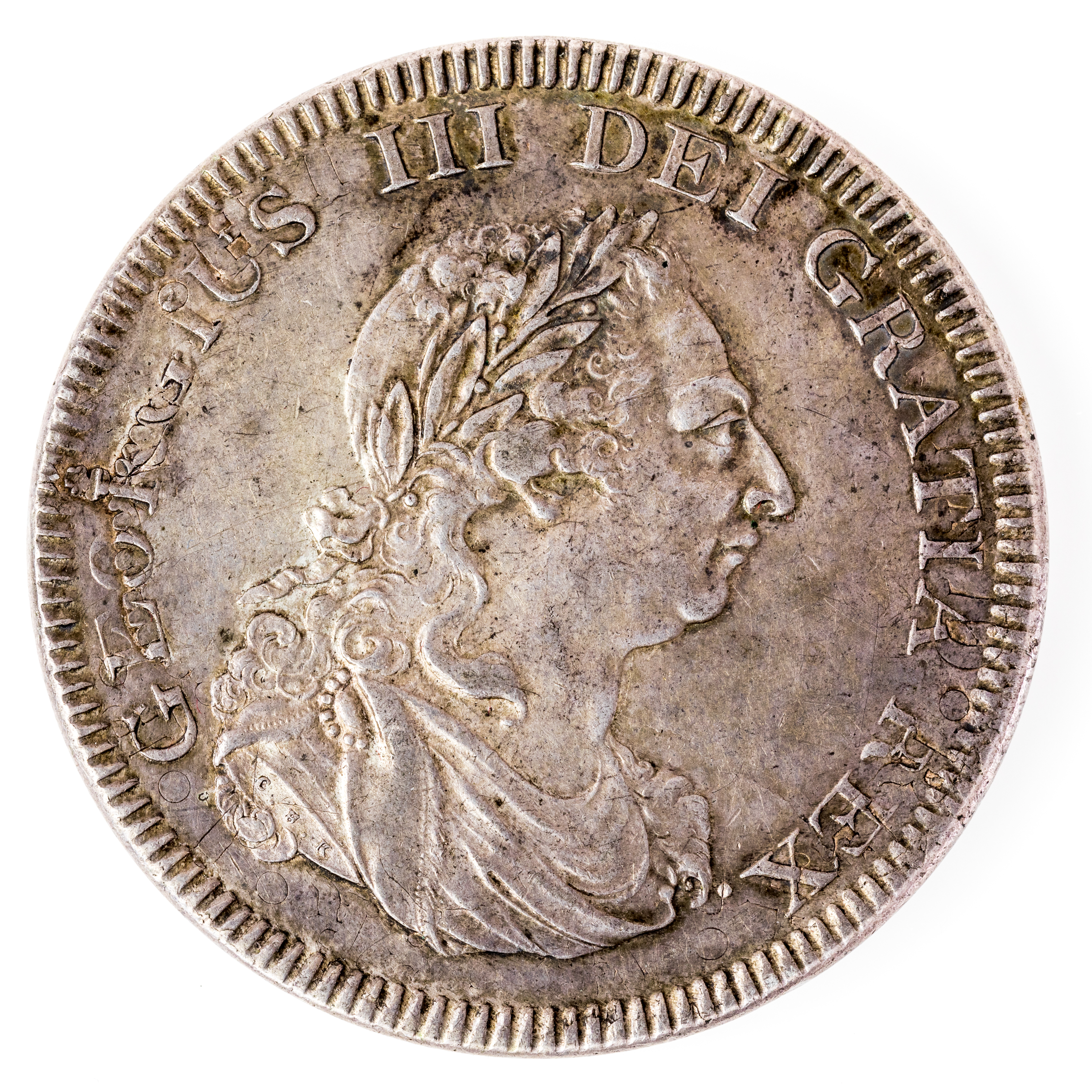
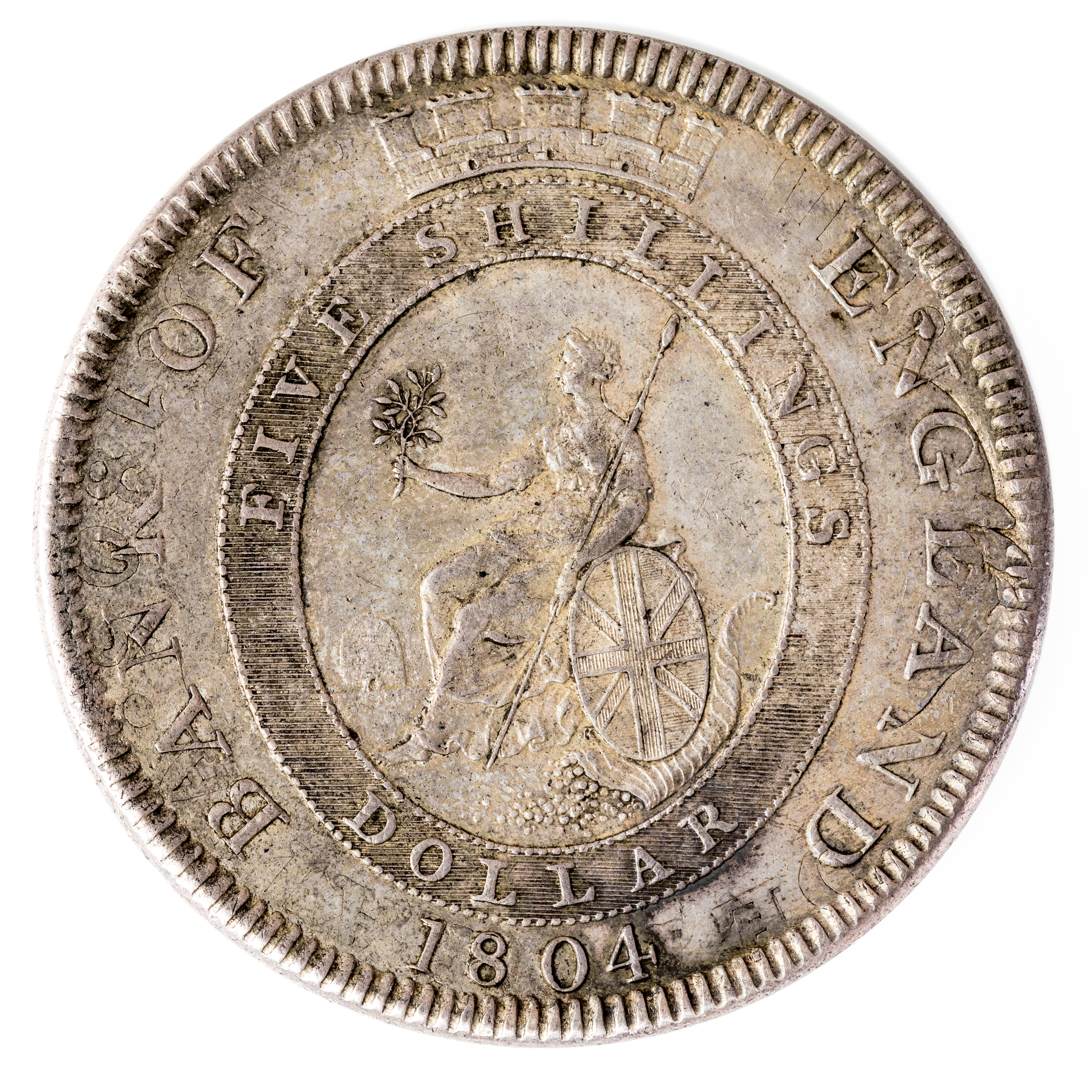
The 1804 Bank of England Dollar designed by Küchler and overstruck on Spanish dollars

He first came to England in March 1793, where he was employed as a medalist and coin engraver at the Soho Mint, owned by the notable manufacturer Matthew Boulton. He was Boulton's sole artist for designing and die-cutting, and produced the designs for various coins, medals and tokens, including the copper "cartwheel" pennies and twopences, and medals depicting the Battle of Trafalgar, Louis XVI and Marie Antoinette. He designed at least three of the obverse portraits for the long reign of George III. He later left the Mint, but continued to be employed by Boulton's firm in London until his death.

Küchler died in Handsworth in 1810, and was buried in the churchyard of St Mary's.

Preceded by not recorded	Coins of the pound sterling Obverse sculptor 1797	Succeeded by Lewis Pingo
Preceded by Lewis Pingo	Coins of the pound sterling Obverse sculptor 1804	Succeeded by Benedetto Pistrucci
