= Twopence (British pre-decimal coin) =

Former official unit of currency of Great Britain and other territories

- United Kingdom
- Value: 2d sterling
- Mass: 56.7 g (2 oz)
- Diameter: 41 mm (1.6 in)
- Edge: Plain
- Composition: Copper
- Years of minting: 1797
- Mint marks: SOHO, below and to the right of Britannia.

Obverse
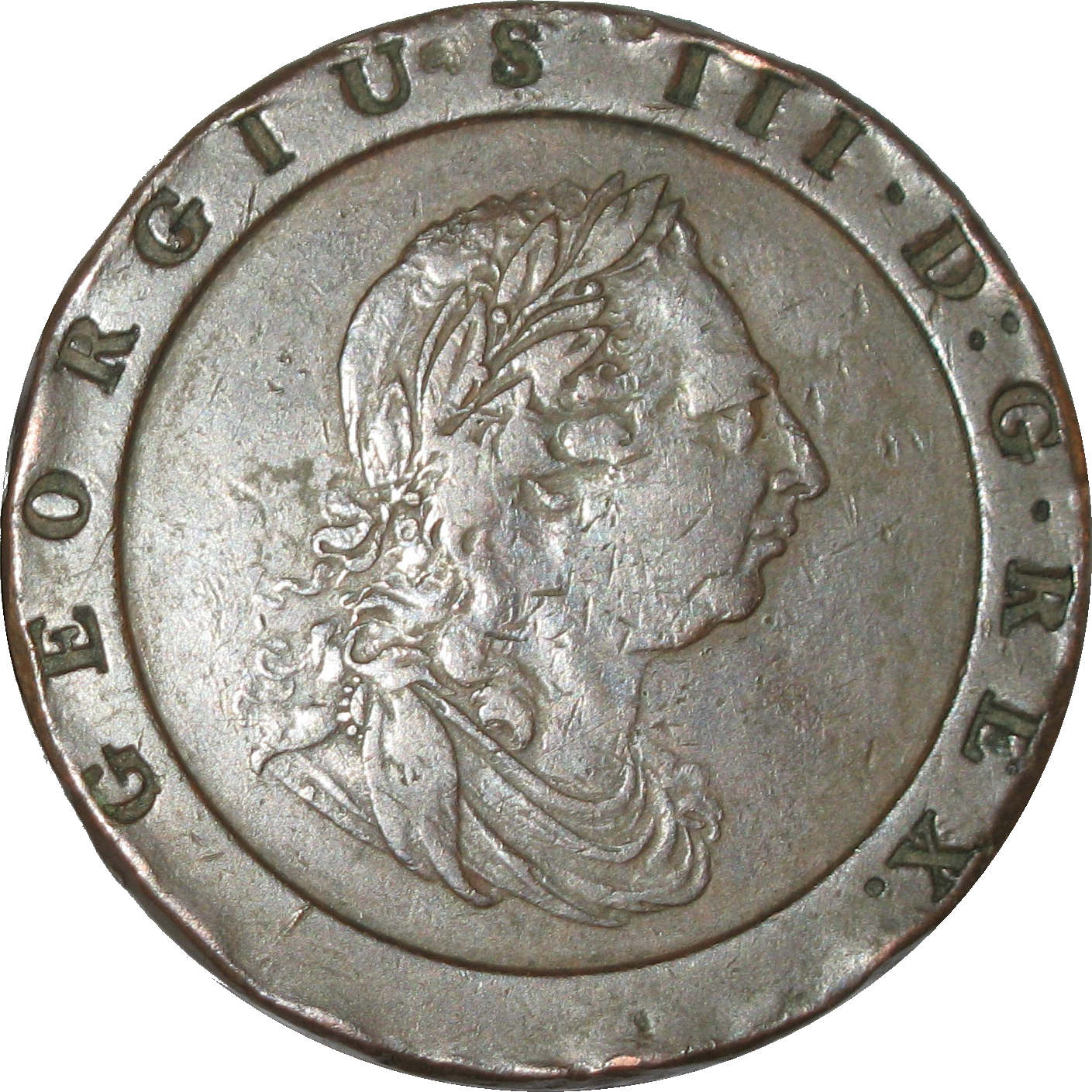
- Design: Profile of George III
- Designer: Conrad Heinrich Küchler
- Design date: 1797

Reverse
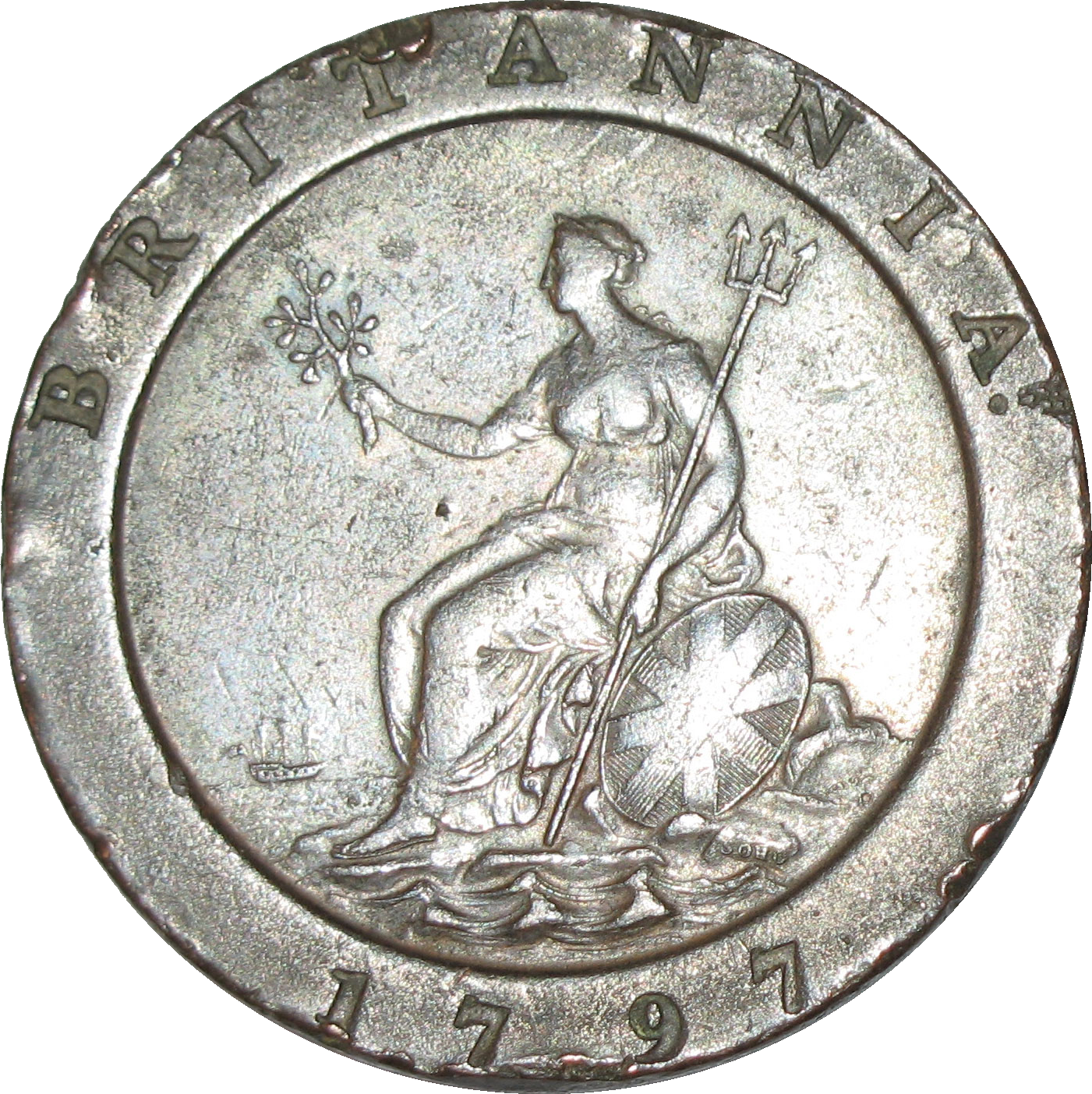
- Design: Britannia
- Designer: Conrad Heinrich Küchler
- Design date: 1797

The British twopence (2d) (/ˈtʌpəns/ or /ˈtuːpəns/) coin, or informally the tuppence, was a denomination of sterling coinage worth two pennies or 1/120 of a pound. It was a short-lived denomination in copper, being minted only in 1797 by Matthew Boulton's Soho Mint.

These coins were made legal tender for amounts of up to one shilling by a proclamation of 26 July 1797. Short-lived twopence coins in silver were also minted in 1817, 1818 and 1820. Twopence coins were made redundant in 1860 with the advent of bronze coinage. The twopence was the largest and heaviest copper coin to circulate across Britain, and second largest and heaviest coin in British circulation after emergency money issued locally under Charles I.

== History ==
The minting of silver pennies for general circulation was halted by the British government in 1660, because the cost of silver had risen too high. By the late 18th century this policy had caused a deficiency in the number of circulating pennies, and many merchants and mining companies had taken to issuing their own copper tokens. For example, the Parys Mining Company on Anglesey issued huge numbers of tokens (although their acceptability was limited).

In 1797 to alleviate this coin shortage, the government authorised Matthew Boulton to strike copper pennies and twopences at his Soho Mint in Birmingham. As it was a requirement that a coin's face value should correspond to the value of the base metal, each was made from two pence worth of copper (2 ounces), making the coins significantly larger than earlier pennies which had been struck in silver. Their large size, combined with the thick rim, led to the nickname "cartwheels". All "cartwheel" twopences are marked with the date 1797. In total, around 720,000 such coins were minted.

By 1802, the production of privately issued provincial tokens had ceased. However, in the next ten years the intrinsic value of copper rose. The return of privately minted token coinage was evident by 1811 and became endemic by 1812 as more of the government-issued copper coinage was melted down for trade. The Royal Mint undertook a massive recoinage programme in 1816, with large quantities of gold and silver coin being minted. To thwart the further issuance of private tokens, in 1817 an act of Parliament was passed which forbade their manufacture under severe penalties.

A short-lived twopence denomination in silver was also produced, with circulation issues in 1817, 1818 and 1820, after which silver twopence coins were issued only as Maundy money.

In 1857, a survey by the Royal Mint found that around one-third of all copper coinage had become worn or mutilated, often by advertisements. A couple of years later Thomas Graham, the master of the mint, convinced William Ewart Gladstone, Chancellor of the Exchequer, that so large a proportion of copper coinage must be taken out of circulation that it was worth introducing an entirely new coinage which would be "much more convenient and agreeable in use". New bronze coins were introduced in 1860, with a face value that was no longer required to match the value of the base metal. A year later, withdrawal of the old copper coinage began.

The coin was nicknamed, "a couple of clods."

== Design ==
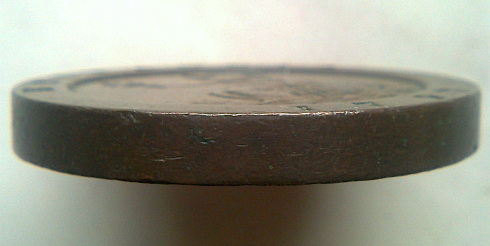
Coin edge of the 1797 twopence, George III

The 1797 coin was minted in copper, with a weight of 2 oz (56.7 g) and a diameter of 1.6 in (41 mm). The obverse features a right-facing portrait of George III, and incused into the rim are the words GEORGIUS III·D·G·REX. The initial K appears on the lowest fold of the drapery at the base of the effigy, indicating that the design is the work of the German engraver Conrad Heinrich Küchler. The reverse, also designed by Kuchler, shows a left-facing seated figure of Britannia, with a trident held loosely in her left hand and an olive branch in her outstretched right. There are waves about her feet, with a small ship to the left and a Union Jack shield below and to the right. On the upper part of the rim is incused the word BRITANNIA and on the lower part the date 1797. The word SOHO appears next to the shield, indicating that the coin came from the Soho Mint.
