= Soho Mint =

Coordinates: 52.49888°N 1.92630°W

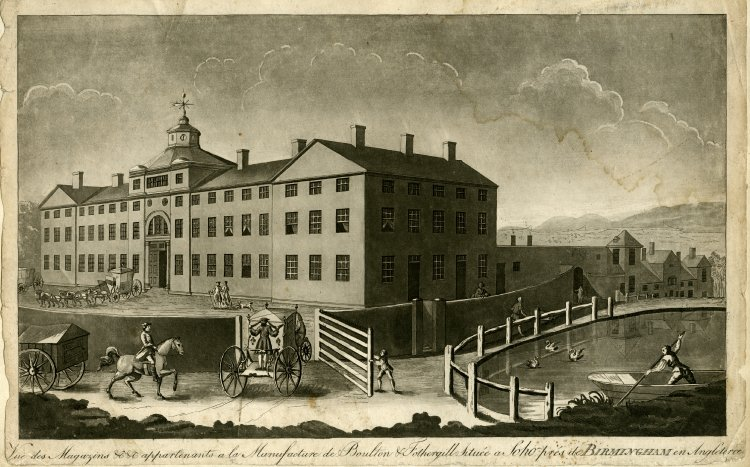
Soho Manufactory in 1773

Soho Mint was created by Matthew Boulton in 1788 in his Soho Manufactory (grid reference SP051890) in Handsworth, West Midlands, England. A mint was erected at the manufactory containing eight machines, to his own patent design, driven by steam engine, each capable of striking 70 to 85 coins per minute.

In addition to copper domestic coins, silver coins were made for some of the colonies, and various trade tokens and medals were struck. Among the medals produced were the Seringapatam medal, made for the East India Company in 1801–2 to reward participants of the Battle of Seringapatam, and a medal for the Battle of Trafalgar, which Matthew Boulton produced at his own expense and gave to all those present at the 1805 battle.

After the demise of the Soho Mint some of the machinery was bought at auction, in 1850, by the new Birmingham Mint of Ralph Heaton II.

== Cartwheel penny ==
The common coinage, copper halfpennies, was subject to severe counterfeiting. No copper coinage had been issued by the Royal Mint since 1754 apart from inadequate issues of halfpence and farthings from 1770 to 1775.

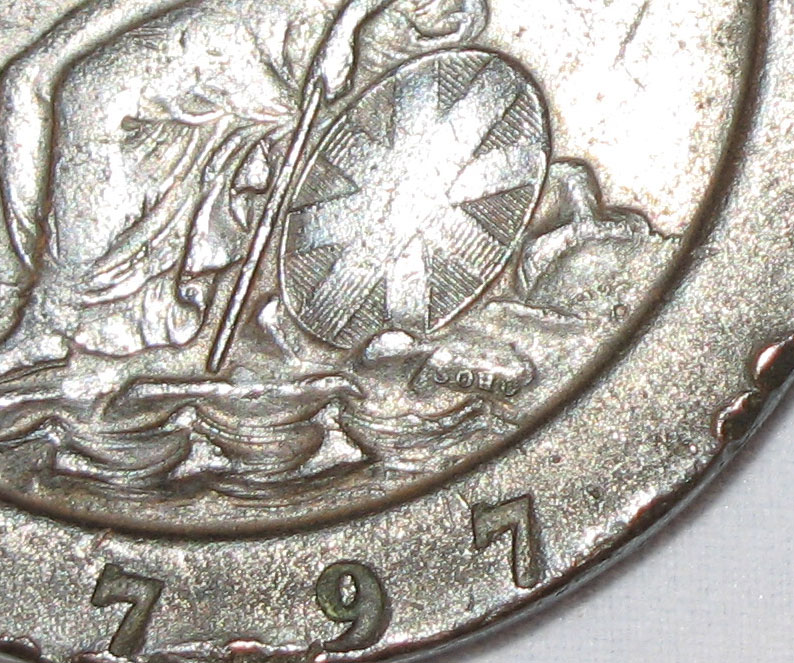
Soho mint mark (the word 'SOHO' below-right of the shield) on a cartwheel twopence

In order to differentiate his proposed copper coins from counterfeits Boulton specified them as follows:

twopence
2 ounces (57 g) weight, diameter 8 to the foot (1.5 inches, 38 mm)
penny
1 ounce (28 g), diameter 17 to two feet (1.4 inches, 36 mm)
half-penny
1/2 ounce (14 g), diameter 10 to a foot (1.2 inches, 30 mm)
farthing
1/4 ounce (7.1 g), diameter 12 to a foot (1 inch, 25 mm)

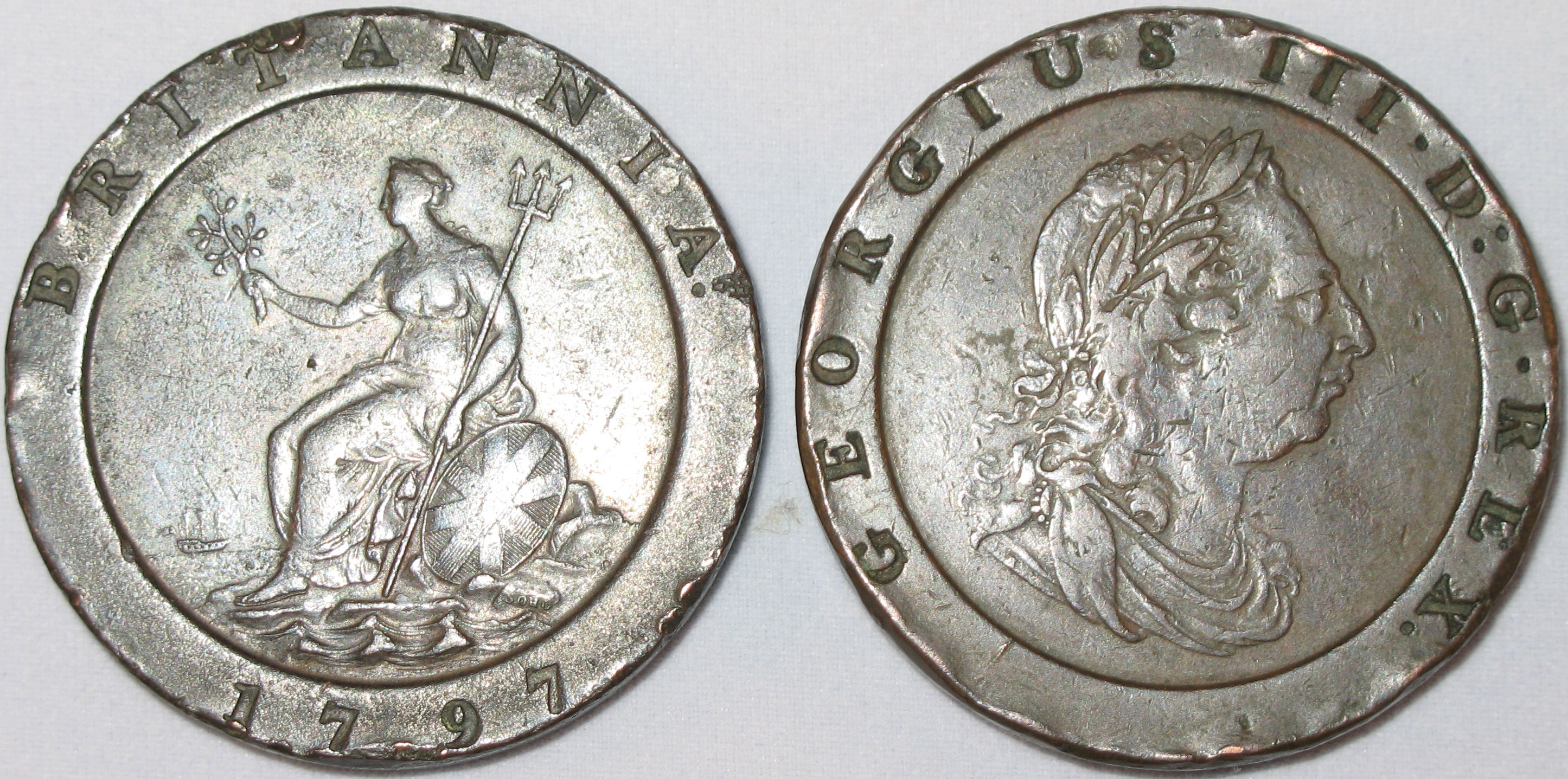
Cartwheel twopence coins made at the Soho Mint in 1797.

Their weight in pure copper should be so close to the intrinsic value of the material that counterfeiting would be uneconomic. The diameter was made strictly defined by striking within a collar so that diameter, thickness and weight could be used to prove the quality of the metal.

In 1797 the first, and only, copper twopence and the first penny coins were produced under contract although the smaller denominations did not follow until later. These coins were comparatively large, having a broad raised rim with the inscription pressed below the surface and became known as the cartwheel pennies. Over 45 million were struck in two years. The new copper coins were issued at the Soho Mint and by Charlotte Matthews in London who was the banker and business advisor to Watt and Boulton.

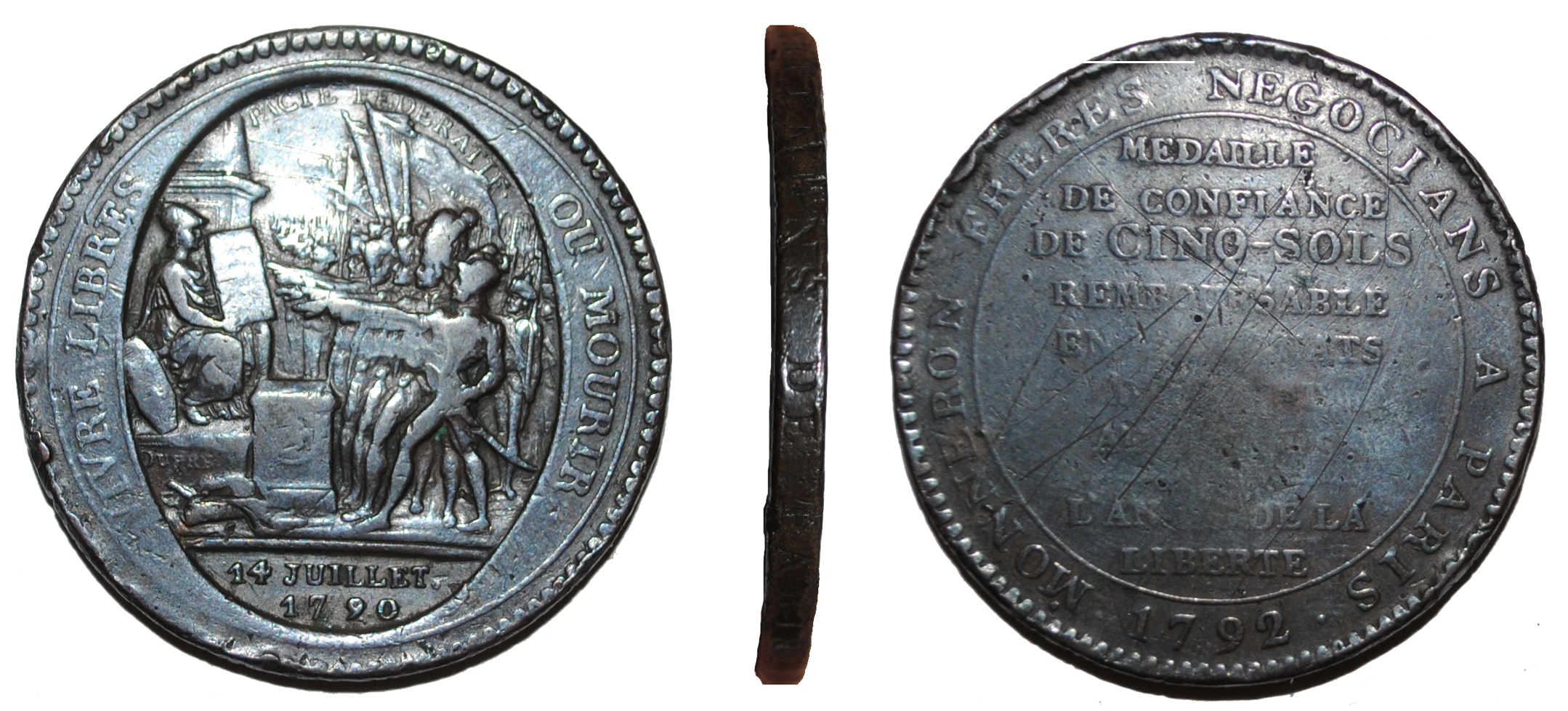
A French revolutionary shop token, minted at Soho in 1791 or 1792

== See also ==
- British halfpenny coin regarding counterfeit coinage
- History of mints
- History of the British penny (1714-1901)
- Old Bess, a steam engine at the Mint
