= Birmingham Mint =

Coin maker in Birmingham, England

Coordinates: 52°29′18″N 01°55′00″W

- Industry: Metallurgy, Minting, Metalworking
- Founded: 1817 (Note: Various dates are given on the founding of the mint including the year Ralph Heaton I established his business (1794). The year Ralph Heaton II established his business (1817) and the year the business started producing coins (1850).)
- Founder: Ralph Heaton II
- Defunct: 2003
- Headquarters: Birmingham, United Kingdom
- Products: coins, tokens, medal, casino chips, metal fixings
- Subsidiaries: King's Norton Mint (defunct 1932)

The Birmingham Mint was a coining mint and metal-working company based in Birmingham, England. Formerly the world's largest privately owned mint, the company produced coins for many foreign nations including France, Italy, China, and much of the British Empire during the 19th century.

Beginning life in 1817 as a family-run brass fittings maker, the company later purchased equipment from the defunct Soho Mint to begin its own coin production. Over the subsequent decades the mint won contracts to mint national currencies, and built minting facilities worldwide so that at its height the Birmingham Mint's capacity surpassed that of even the Royal Mint.

By the early 2000s disagreement with the Royal Mint over foreign contracts led to a slump in sales, cumulating in the mint's eventual closure in 2003 ending its almost 200-year history. According to Companies House, however, as of 2021 a revived mint continues to operate, albeit with little business activity.

== History ==
=== 18th–19th century ===
The history of the Birmingham Mint can be traced back as far as 1794, when local engineer and businessman Ralph Heaton (1755–1832) established his brass foundry on the now-demolished Slaney Street in Birmingham. Against the backdrop of the Industrial Revolution Heaton had already gained a reputation as a capable inventor who worked to manufacturer rose-engines and tools used in the various Birmingham trades of the time, such as metal working. Over the years Heaton's sons John (b.1781), William (b. 1784), George (b. 1789), Ralph II (b. 1794), and Reuben (1796 - 21 November 1847) gradually joined their father in the family business. In 1817 Heaton's fourth son Ralph Heaton II (1794–1862) established a new company within the premises of his father's business, which by then had relocated to nearby Shadwell Street. Like his father, Heaton II focused mainly on producing brass fittings in the foundry of metals, however as a former apprentice die-maker, Heaton II also worked to produce dies. By 1847, Heaton II's business was renamed Ralph Heaton and Son when Ralph III joined his father. A few years later in 1853 the business became Heaton and Sons when his other son George also joined. This name was retained until 1889.

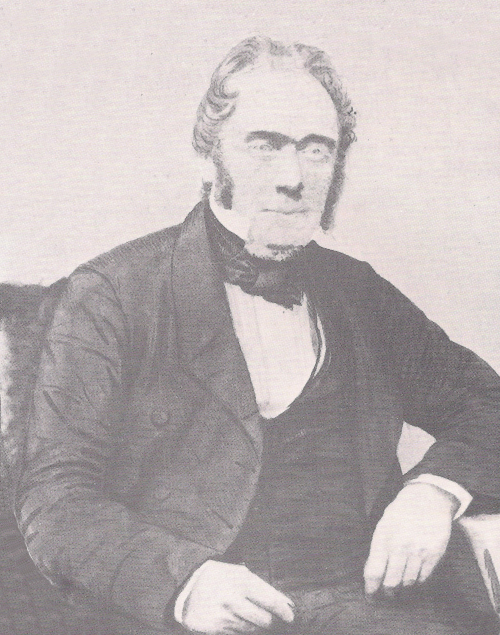
Birmingham Mint founder Ralph Heaton II

On 1 April 1850. an auction was announced in the Birmingham Gazette for the selling of assets from the recently defunct Soho Mint. Included in the sale were lathes, milling machines, dies, and most notably coin presses of a similar type to those used at the Royal Mint in London. Having had experience in the die-making process, and noting a lack of any competition, Heaton made a decision to purchase the necessary equipment in hopes of taking over the contracts left in the wake of the Soho Mint's demise. A few weeks later on 29 April, the auction was held on-site in the closed Soho Mint. Although no information regarding the bidding process was recorded, documentation from the time shows that Heaton was successful in his bidding and purchased four steam-powered screw presses and six planchet presses, which he installed on Bath/Shadwell street. Now with the tools needed to start minting coins, all that was required was government permission. Unlike the government-owned Royal Mint, which was generally forbidden from producing coins for foreign powers, private mints could be granted a special license. Heaton II wrote to his MP, Richard Spooner, who in turn vouched for Heaton's good character. Subsequently, permission was given and the new venture could begin.

As the British Empire continued its global expansion into new territories across Asia, the government-owned Royal Mint proved unable to effectively supply the coinage needed for the burgeoning colonies. A reason for this was the inability of the Royal Mint to alternate between metals during production, meaning copper coins were passed over for the more lucrative silver and gold. Fortunately for the Birmingham Mint, this left a gap in the market which, when coupled with void left by the defunct Soho Mint, offered the promise of a steady supply of business. The first order received by the mint came in the form of tokens for Britain's Australian colony, which had previous made orders from the Soho Mint. After this, a substantial order from Chile saw over nine million copper centavos and half centavos produced; this was the mint's first striking of circulating coins. Soon the Royal Mint in London, which was experiencing high demand, was forced to outsource the minting of its domestic copper to the Birmingham Mint by requesting planchets for pennies halfpennies farthings half farthings and quarter farthings.

In October 1852, the mint was presented with a new opportunity outside that of simply supplying coinage. Neighbouring France were in the process of a major re-coining effort, and requested help in operating and re-equipping one of their minting facilities, in Marseille. To oversee the endeavour himself, Heaton II gathered a few of his workers and moved to Marseille for the project's duration, while periodically making trips back to England. Upon reaching the French mint, Heaton II found it in a state of disrepair with broken coin presses and rusting milling machines which he later sold for scrap. Replacement machinery was soon ordered from the Paris Mint, and new equipment imported for Birmingham. When all was done Heaton II had spent a total of £3,700 on refurbishment. The Marseille Mint produced over 101 million coins, consisting of 1, 2, 5 and centime pieces, and after five years of production Heaton II's involvement in France's recoinage was complete. The mint facility was sold off for £1,080 or 27,000 francs.

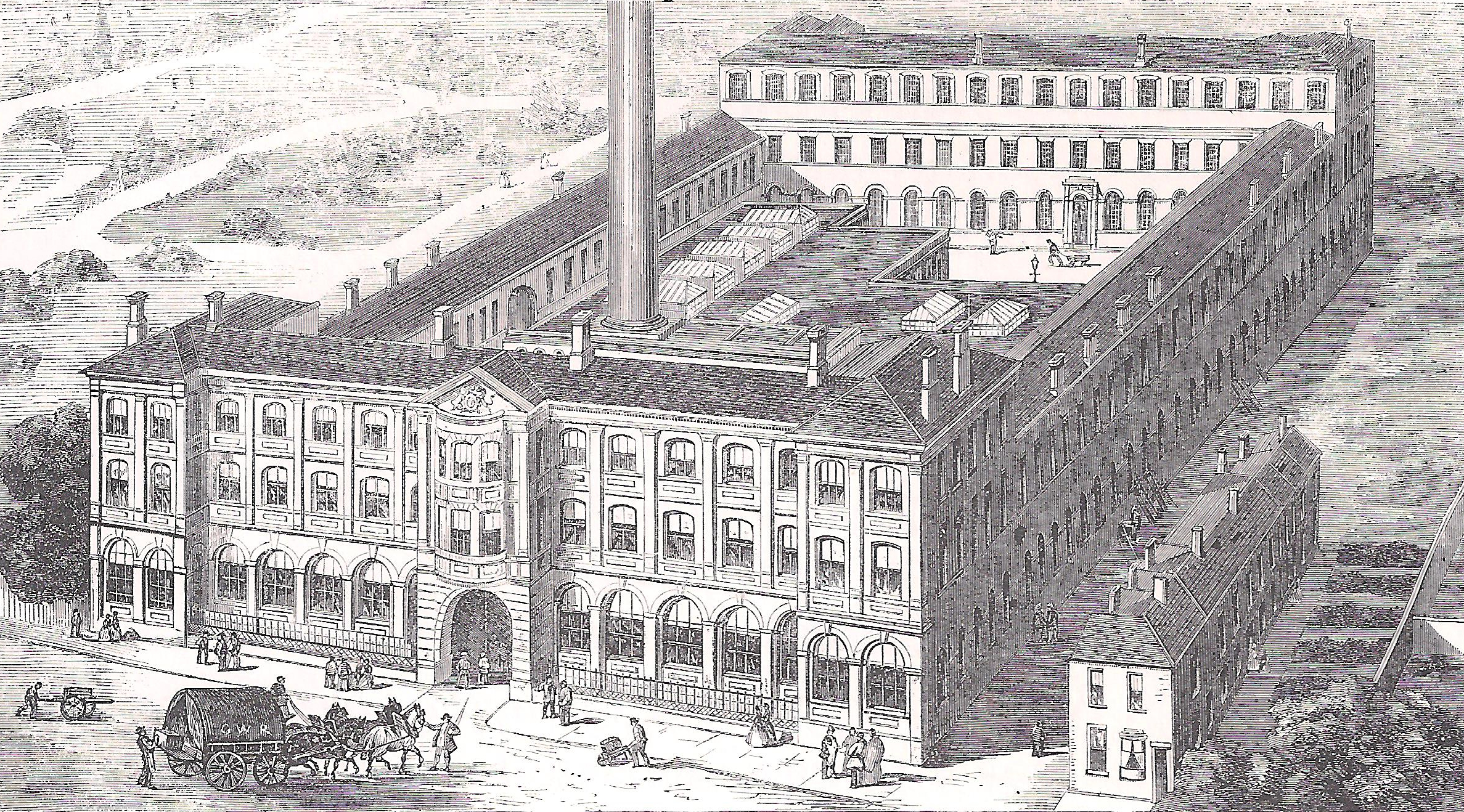
Mint building – 1862

As overseas orders continued to increase, particularly for India, the mint added a new lever press and further equipment, filling the Shadwell Street premises to capacity. So as to accommodate their increased business, in 1860 the firm bought a 1-acre (0.40 ha) plot on Icknield Street and constructed a three-storey red brick factory which opened two years later. The new building housed eleven screws presses and one lever press.

Upon Heaton II's death in 1862, responsibility for the company fell to his eldest son, Ralph Heaton III, who had worked alongside his father for over twenty years, and was already well-versed in the business of coin making. It was around this time that the mint began a phase-out of its cumbersome noisy screw press in favour of more modern lever presses which could produce better quality strikes at a greater speed. These lever operated presses used at the mint were developed within the mint's own workshops, and so led to opportunities in supplying foreign countries with minting equipment.

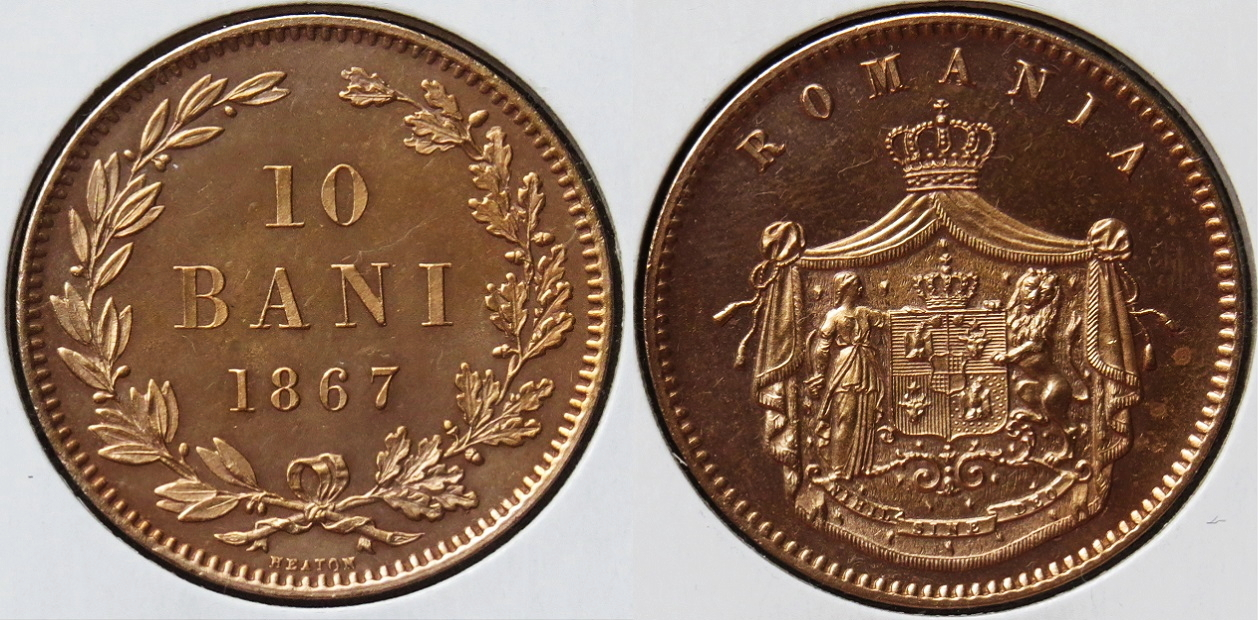
Romanian 10 Bani proof copper coin marked "Heaton" (1867)

The first of these orders for minting equipment came from Burma where the British continued to gain dominance over the Konbaung dynasty. Arriving at the royal capital of Mandalay in 1865 by early November, a mint was in operation producing four denominations of the kyat, namely the silver 1 Mu, 5 Mu, 1 Mat and 1 Kyat coins. To provide for these coins, 1,200 dies featuring the dynasty's peacock emblem were produced in Birmingham. Over the next few years the mint continued to receive large orders for coinage including 40 million for British Hong Kong, 50 million for Romania, and over 90 million for the recently formed Kingdom of Italy.

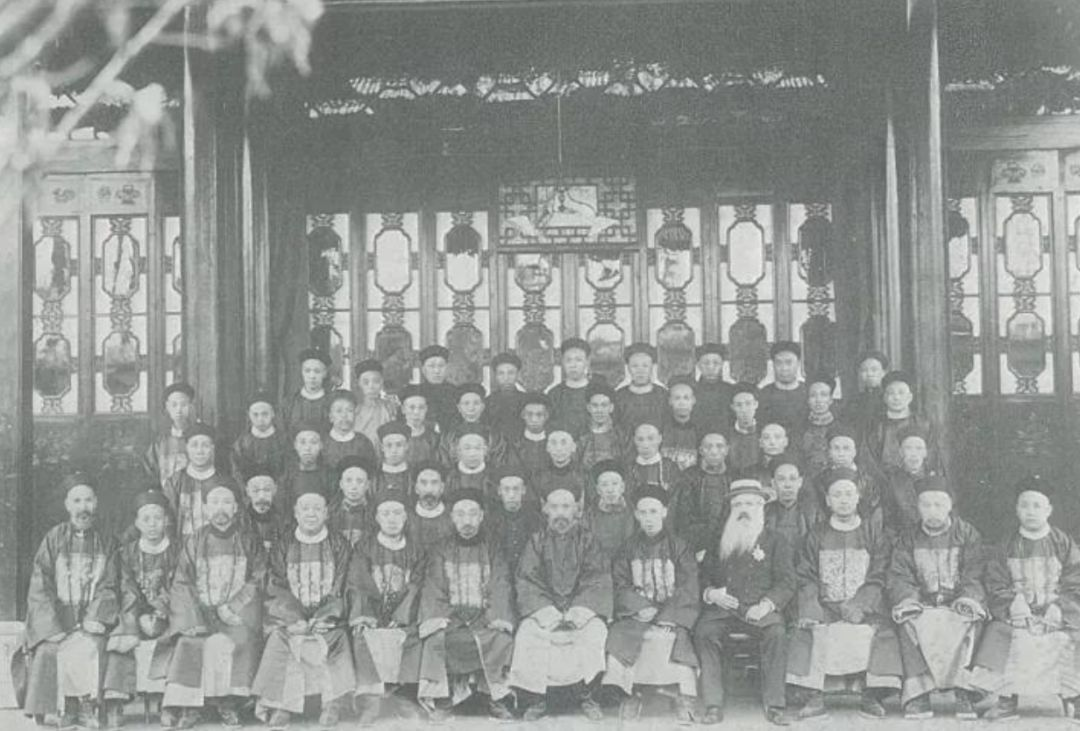
Canton Mint circa 1900

In 1887 the Birmingham Mint was once again contacted by a foreign nation, this time representatives of the Chinese government, requesting help in the construction and operation of a new modernised minting facility in Canton province. Previous attempts by the Empress Dowager Cixi to introduce new machining techniques into China had failed, with mints in Zhili and Nanjing being unable to supplant the well established local cast cash coins. Unlike these regions, Canton was under increased Western influence with foreign merchants dealing primarily in silver. The new Canton Mint opened in 1889, and was equipped with 90 lever coining presses imported from Birmingham. With the ability to produce 2.7 million coins per day, it was the largest mint in the world. To oversee day-to-day operations and train Chinese workers, the chief of the Birmingham Mint Operative Department, Edward Wyon, remained in China for a few years before returning to England.

=== 20th century – present ===
In 1923, the U.K. government's Royal Mint reconsidered its position on the potential commercial aspect of its operations. Up until this point, with a few exceptions for friendly countries, the Royal Mint had maintained a policy of not minting coins for foreign powers due to its position as a governmental entity. To not significantly damage the Birmingham Mint, the Royal Mint agreed to offer a third of Royal Mint's overseas contracts. Despite this, the Birmingham Mint's work was greatly diminished and was required to compete for new contracts. This decision was to have an enormous effect on the future of the Birmingham Mint, and marked the start of the mint's gradual decline.

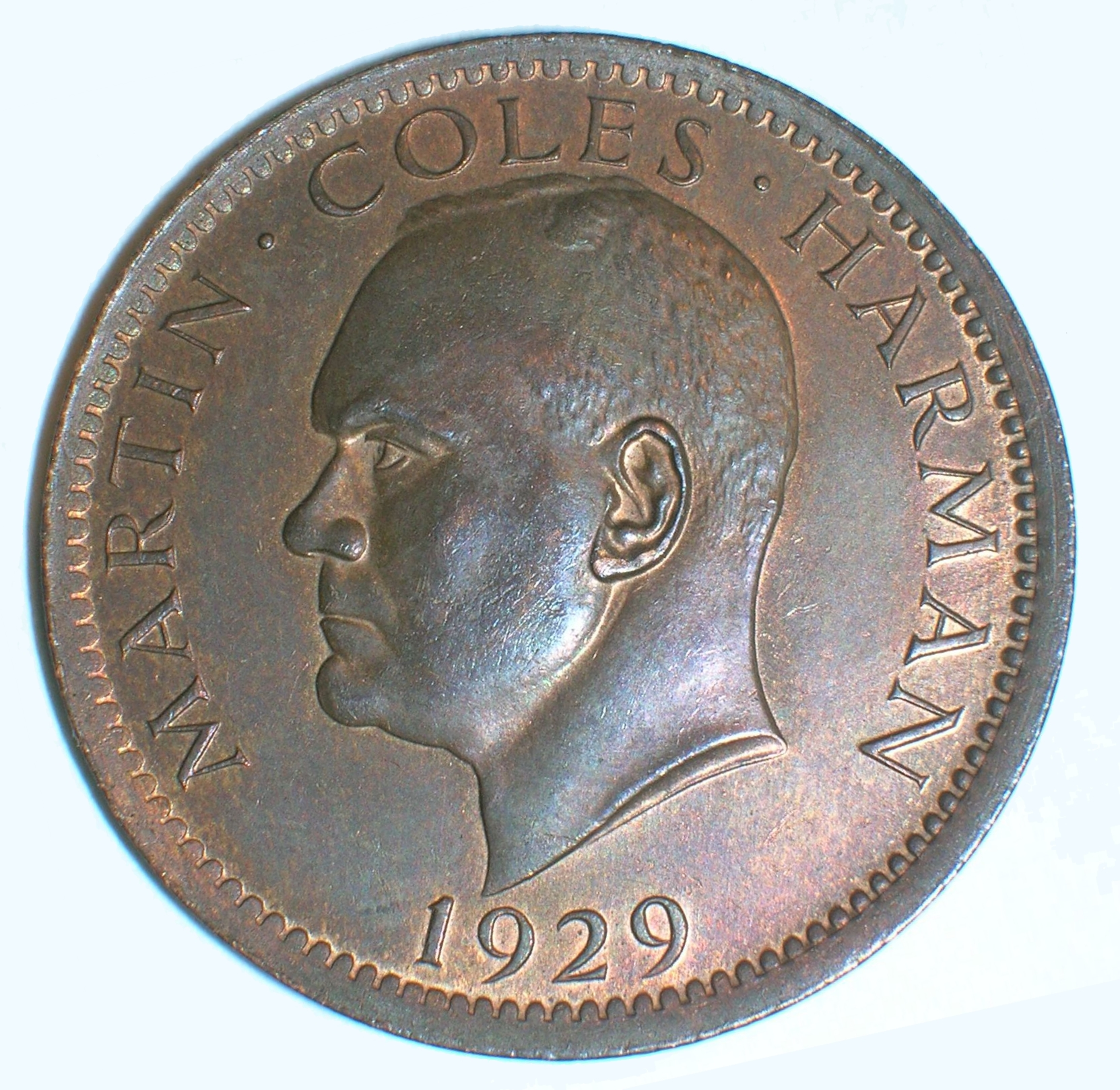
Puffin coin minted in 1929

Now having to contend with the Royal Mint as competition, the Birmingham Mint looked to expand its interests outside of normal coin production. One such contract came in the form of a commission by businessman and self-appointed King Martin Coles Harman who in 1929 requested coins with his likeness be minted for use on his privately owned island of Lundy. Two coins were made for Harman, namely the Puffin and Half Puffin, which were based upon the British Penny and Half Penny. A total of 50,000 of each denomination were minted and delivered for use on the island. Subsequently, the legality of coins as a form of legal tender were called into question when they were accused of contravening the Coinage Act 1870. Harman was later brought to court and Birmingham Mint director William Ernest Bromet was ordered to give testimony on the mint's involvement. In 1931 Harman was found guilty of breaching the Coinage Act and fined £5. The Mint was ruled to have not been liable.

In 1991, the Birmingham Mint was purchased by engineering firm IMI plc who also owned the nearby IMI Mint in Witton (formerly known as King's Norton Mint). Under restructuring plans, the minting facility in Witton closed and operations merged with the plant on Icknield Street in Hockley. The new amalgamated mint was initially renamed the IMI Birmingham Mint, however, it was subsequently renamed to The Birmingham Mint when it was sold in 2000 to venture capital firm 3i for £18 million.

Around the same time, the European Union was increasing plans for the launch of the Euro, which over time would replace the currencies of its member states. Although the United Kingdom decided to opted out of the European currency project, the Birmingham Mint attempted to win a contract to produce coin planchets for the new Euros, which consisted of eight denominations. To showcase the mint's striking ability and production quality, a series of pattern coins were struck for all eight of the Euro's denominated coins. Similar to legal tender Euros, these coins featured the same reverse design, mass, dimensions, and metal composition, however, the obverse was pressed with the Birmingham Mint's logo. Sixty-five sets of these coins were sent to mints across Europe, and a few sample pouches were made up for mint salesmen. Upon hearing of these sample coins, the European Commission deemed them illegal counterfeits and ordered their destruction. Apart from helping to supply planchets, this was the mint's only involvement in the Euro.

By the early 2000s another financial blow was a dispute with the Royal Mint over an agreement regarding historic rights to profits on overseas contracts. The Birmingham Mint alleged the two parties had had an unwritten agreement since the 1960s that they obtain one-third of all orders the Royal Mint received from outside Europe. The Royal Mint disputed this claim, and on 12 June 2002 the Birmingham Mint filed a claim in the High Court against the Treasury for £5.4 million in damages. Two years prior to the court case, owner 3i sold the mint to former chief executive Roland Vernon, who submitted a memorandum to Parliament suggesting the rights to mint British coins be put out to tender for private companies, pointing to the Royal Mint's poor financial performance. Despite recording an operating profit of £5.2 million in 2001; compared with the Royal Mint's record loss in the same period of £6.5 million, the loss in business from overseas contracts proved too great, and in 2003 the mint was forced into administration under the purview of KPMG. It was later acquired by JFT Law & Co., Ltd., and its assets retained by liquidators Stirchley Machine Tools, Ltd.

Following an abortive proposal for the mint to become a museum in 2011 the remainder of the mint relocated to Kidderminster, just outside Birmingham.

== Mint building ==
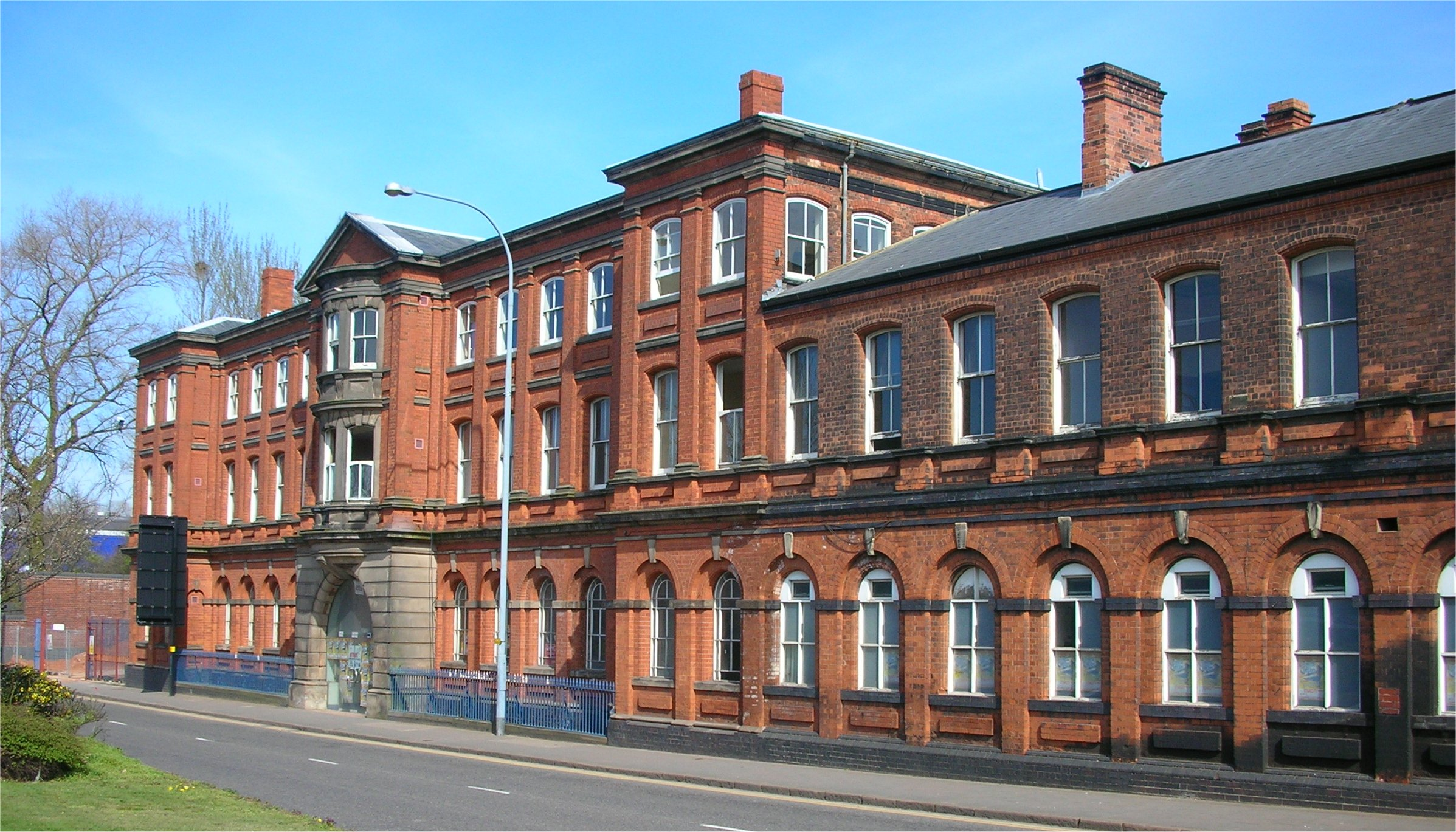
Present day mint building built on Icknield Street

The purpose-built 19th century Birmingham Mint building is situated on Icknield Street in the North-West of Birmingham's Jewellery Quarter. It was constructed in 1860 after the mint's former residence on Shadwell Street was outgrown. The building was designated Grade II Listed on 8 July 1982.

Built to encompass a rectangular yard, the works have a symmetrical formal elevation to the street, in an Italianate red brick style. A long range on 3 storeys of 2:5:1:5:2 bays, the end pairs and broader pedimented centre break forward, along with hipped slate roofs. The ground floor has round-headed windows recessed in an arcade, with ashlar impost band and keystones, rising from a basement articulated by brick pilasters set on pedestals in the applied parapet, the first floor sill course broken forward over bases; panelled zones below second floor sills defined by sections of ashlar string course between the pilasters. There is an ashlar bed mould to main entablature with projecting ashlar eaves cornice. The centrepiece has a channelled ashlar ground floor with large rounded archway, the keystone angled out as bracket to support two storey tripartite ashlar bow window with panelled aprons, divided by consoles on second floor; the main entablature is broken forward over the bow. The range along the street is the front range of a quadrangular plan, of which the interior faces of the courtyard have an arcaded treatment.

== Mint operations ==
The Birmingham Mint was best known for its coin production, however, throughout its history it also manufactured machinery and other numismatic-related products such as planchets, tokens, medals, and casino chips.

=== Coins ===
The mint worked with many nations to produce coins and planchets, often minting them in the Birmingham Mint itself or in one of the mints constructed overseas.

Africa
- Algeria
- Belgian Congo
- British East Africa
- British West Africa
- British Mauritius
- Democratic Republic of the Congo
- Dominion of Ghana
- Ethiopian Empire
- Imperial British East Africa Company
- Kenya
- Liberia
- Morocco
- Nigeria
- Portuguese Angola
- Portuguese Mozambique
- Sultanate of Egypt / Kingdom of Egypt
- Sultanate of Zanzibar
- Sierra Leone
- Somalia
- South African Republic
- Straits Settlements
- Tanzania
- Tunisia
- Uganda
- Uganda Protectorate
- Yemen, Tarim
- Zambia

Europe
- Belgium
- Bulgaria
- British Cyprus
- European Union – Patterns only
- Finland
- France
- Guernsey
- Great Britain
  - Coins of Lundy – Tokens
- Greece
- Iceland
- Ireland
- Jersey
- Kingdom of Italy
- Latvia
- Malta
- Poland
- Romania
- Russia
- Serbia
- Tuscany

Americas
- Argentina
- Bahama Islands
- Bolivia
- Brazil
- British Honduras
- Canada
  - Province of Canada Quebec
  - Nova Scotia
  - Prince Edward Island
  - Province of New Brunswick
  - Dominion of Canada
- Chile
- Colombia
- Colony of Jamaica
- Costa Rica
- Dominican Republic
- Ecuador
- El Salvador
- Fiji
- Guatemala
- Guyana
- Haiti
- Mexico
- Newfoundland
- Nicaragua
- Paraguay
- Peru
- Trinidad and Tobago
- Uruguay
- Venezuela

Asia & Oceania
- Aden Protectorate, Ghurfah Village
- Australia
- Brunei
- British Hong Kong
- Ceylon
- Emirate of Afghanistan
- Federation of Malaya
- French Indochina
- India – Company rule in India
  - Hyderabad
  - Indore State
  - Pudukkottai State
  - Travancore
- Iran
- Iraq
- Israel
- Japan
- Jordan
- Kingdom of Hejaz
- Konbaung dynasty (Myanmar)
- Malaysia
- Muscat and Oman
- Nepal
- North Borneo
- Qing China
- Republic of China
- Sarawak
- Saudi Arabia
- Siam (Thailand)
- Turkey
- South Vietnam
- Syrian Republic
- United States of the Ionian Islands

== Sources ==
- Sweeny, James O (1981). A Numismatic History of the Birmingham Mint. The Mint. ISBN 9780950759401.
- Challis, C. E. (1992). A New History of the Royal Mint. Cambridge University Press. ISBN 9780521240260.
- Craig, John (2011). The Mint A History of the London Mint from A.D. 287 to 1948. Cambridge University Press. ISBN 9780521170772.
