= King's Norton Mint =

Defunct metalworking and minting company

Kings Norton Mint
- Industry: Metallurgy, Minting, Metalworking
- Founded: 1889
- Founder: Thomas Richard Bayliss, George Hagger
- Defunct: 1962

Kings Norton Mint was a 19th-century metalworking and minting company founded in Birmingham, England. As a private company it worked to develop and manufacture various metal products including wire, nails, ammunition, and later coins on behalf of the Royal Mint. Notably it is credited with inventing solid-drawn ammunition cartridges for small firearms.

== History ==
The Kings Norton Mint was founded in 1889 as The King's Norton Metal Company by engineers Thomas Richard Bayliss and George Hagger. Initially the company specialised in the manufacture of coinage strip and coin blanks, however also produced products for the construction industry. Prior to the mint's creation, the nearby Birmingham Mint under the ownership of Ralph Heaton III had dominated the industry, allowing little competition for minting contracts. By 1912 the company acquired a contract from the Royal Mint to supply bronze Planchet for its London-based facility and later started to supply coinage for the British Empire. Working in conjunction with the Royal Mint and the Birmingham Mint, the Kings Norton Mint eventually struck its own coin series marked with a K N mint mark.

With the outbreak of World War I priorities shifted towards the war effort and instead focused on ammunitions and weaponry.

In 1926 the Mint was amalgamated into Imperial Chemical Industries.
