= William IV's British coinage =

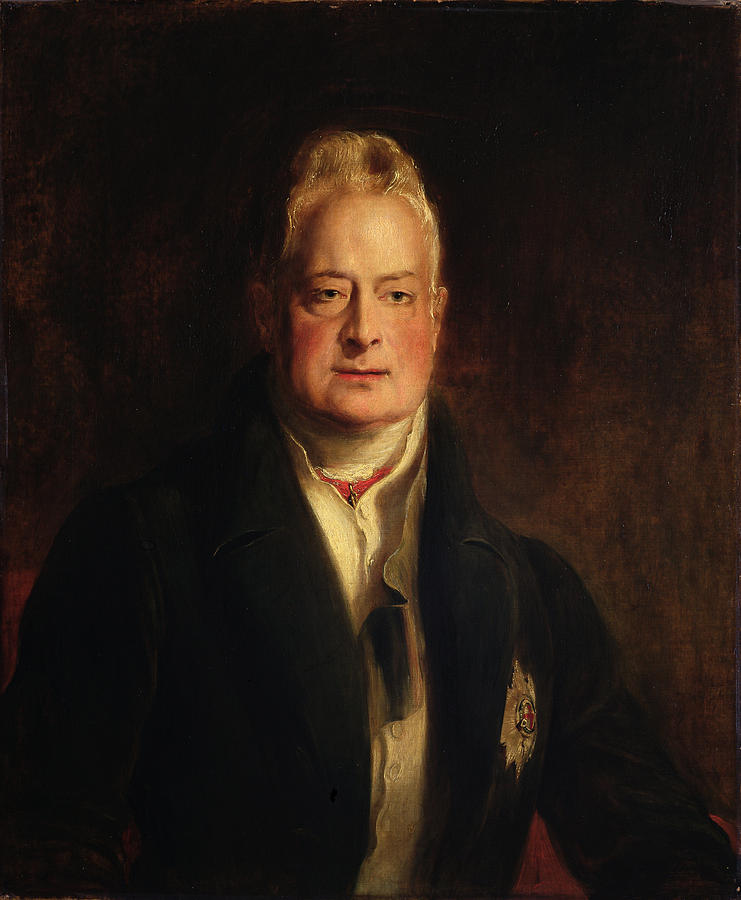
William IV as king

The British coinage struck under William IV (r. 1830–1837) ranged in denomination from the double sovereign (£2) to the third farthing (1/3 of a farthing, 1/12 of a penny, 1/2880 of a pound) though the former was not minted for circulation and the latter struck only for colonial use. The coins have an obverse by William Wyon based on a sketch by Francis Chantrey, and reverses by Wyon and Jean Baptiste Merlen, both of the Royal Mint.

Preparation for William's coinage began even before he became king in June 1830, probably because Wyon was anxious to head off a potential challenge from his rival, Benedetto Pistrucci. Wyon's work was viewed by William, who liked it and ordered it to be used exclusively for coins during his reign; it was also used on his coronation medal. The designs were formally approved in early 1831, and coining began later that year.

In addition to the issues for use in Britain, several small denominations of sterling were struck during William's reign for colonial use. Two of these, the half farthing and silver threepence, were later issued for use in Britain. William's reign saw no great innovations in coinage, but marked the start of reform at the Royal Mint.

== Background ==
William IV was styled William, Duke of Clarence, before succeeding to the throne at age 64 on the death of his brother George IV in June 1830. Until Charles III in 2022, he was the oldest person to become the British monarch. He had ten illegitimate children by the actress Dorothea Jordan, but his marriage to Princess Adelaide of Saxe-Meiningen produced no surviving offspring. He died in 1837, with his niece, Victoria, his successor.

William Wyon was born in 1795 in Birmingham. Many of his relatives were medallists or worked in die engraving, including his father, Peter Wyon, who engraved many tokens and medals. In 1815, his cousin Thomas Wyon was appointed chief engraver at the Royal Mint in London and William was invited to become his assistant. In 1817 Thomas Wyon died. There was internal conflict between William Wyon and the Italian-born sculptor, Benedetto Pistrucci, as to who should succeed him. Pistrucci had been promised the position despite being ineligible as a foreigner. In 1828 Wyon was given the position of chief engraver and Pistrucci made chief medallist, at equal salaries. Nevertheless, the conflict between the two, joined by their partisans, continued.

Jean Baptiste Merlen (also known as Johann Baptist Merlen) was of Flemish origin and had been working on official medals in Paris under the First French Empire. He emigrated to Britain and was hired by the Royal Mint, apparently at Pistrucci's recommendation. His formal position was as a temporary extra engraver, as he was, like Pistrucci, a foreigner ineligible by statute for the permanent salaried posts at the Royal Mint. Merlen in practice acted as second engraver, and that position was held vacant until after his retirement in 1844.

== Preparation ==
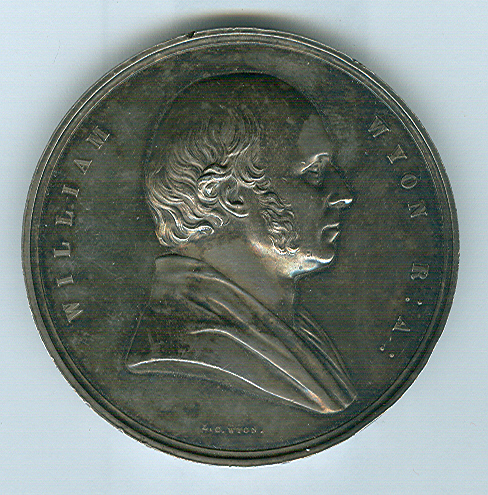
William Wyon on a posthumous medal by his son, Leonard Charles Wyon, 1854

Wyon began his preparations for King William's coinage even before George IV had died, obtaining a sketch of William from the sculptor Francis Chantrey in April 1830. Wyon took care that no word of this reached George's ears. Mark Jones, in his biography of Wyon, suggested that the two were anxious to have work done in advance of any competition from Pistrucci, and the sketch bore an inscription that it was not to be reproduced nor given to a third party without Chantrey's consent. Once William was king, Wyon could continue his labours on the new coins without concealment, working from a low-relief bust of William provided by Chantrey. A die for the crown, and probably an impression from it, were shown to King William, who greatly liked the design and ordered that no other portrait of him be used during his reign.

Nevertheless, by late 1830, it publicly appeared little or nothing had been done to prepare King William's coinage. On 15 November 1830, John Charles Herries, the Master of the Mint, stated that the delay was because of the need to engrave an accurate portrait of the King based on the Chantrey portrait, as William desired. Chantrey had to adapt his portrait to the style used on coinage, and Wyon then had to engrave the result in steel. By this time the King had already approved the engravings, as Herries had written to the Mint Board on 28 October. An order in council authorising the new coinage was issued on 22 November 1830 and the new coins were made current by proclamation dated 13 April 1831.

Pistrucci had obtained an early model of a reducing machine, allowing designs to be translated from plaster models to different die sizes. Wyon had in 1824 secured a similar machine. This allowed him to make identical images for the different sizes of coins in King William's new coinage.

== Designs ==
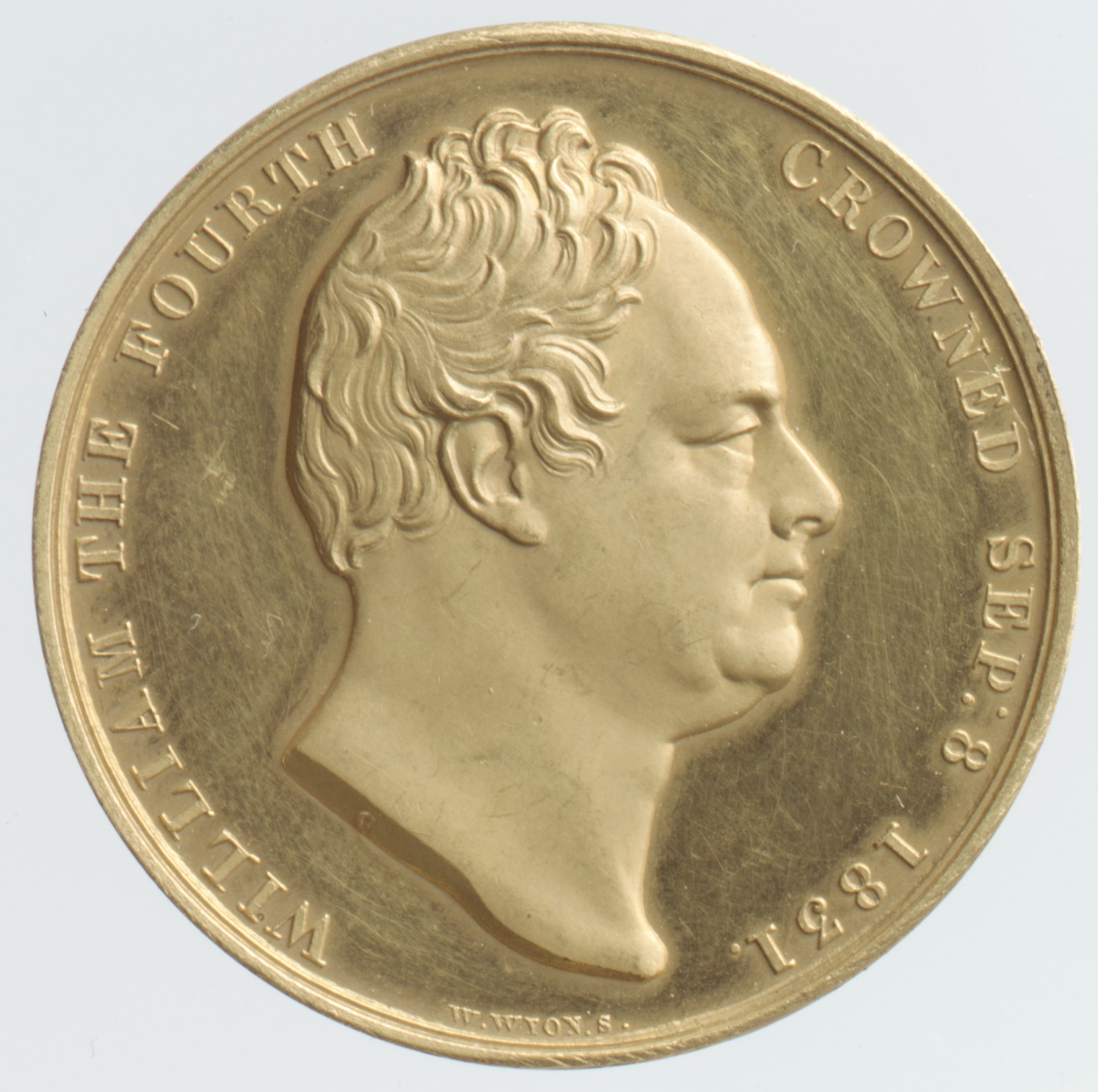
The obverse of Wyon's coronation medal for William IV uses the same bust as the coins.

Because of the relatively short length of the reign, only one set of designs was used for William's coinage. The obverses are by Wyon based on a model by Chantrey, and the gold and silver coins bear identical inscriptions on that side, GULIELMUS IIII D[ei] G[ratia] BRITANNIAR[UM] REX F[idei] D[efensor] (William IV by the Grace of God King of the Britains, Defender of the Faith). The only inscription on the reverse of the gold and silver coins, on some denominations, is ANNO and the date. This differs from the practice on some George IV coins such as the sovereign, where Latin words surround the reverse design, and gave Merlen more room in which to work. He used this space on the sovereign for ornate scrollwork, and for the date. The shilling and sixpence, issued with new designs in 1831, represent the first time an English or British coin bore its denomination in words; the fourpence (1836) also does so. Wyon's initials WW are found on the truncation of the King's neck.

Most of the reverses for the silver and gold coins were by Merlen, with credit for the coppers going to Wyon. The sovereign and half sovereign depict the royal arms on a shield, bearing on it a smaller crowned shield with the arms of the Kingdom of Hanover, which William also ruled. Wyon may have been influenced in the choice of design for the crown by an offer from a potential benefactor stating that he would remember Wyon in his will if the Mint in 1831 issued a crown depicting the entirety of the King's arms. The crown was not issued for circulation, but merely for collectors. Both it and the half crown bear the royal arms draped in a mantle of ermine, as does the double sovereign. The shilling and sixpence surround their denominations with a wreath of oak. The fourpence, designed by Wyon, is the only British silver coin to bear the image of a seated Britannia and in that regard resembles the copper coinage.

The threepence and three halfpence have reverse designs by Merlen with wreathed numerals on the reverse. In that, they resemble the Maundy money, whose reverse designs, by Merlen, are unchanged from the previous reign. Because of the resemblance, the three halfpence is collected as a British coin although it never circulated there.

Wyon's reverse design for the copper coinage, depicting Britannia, is almost unchanged from the design he created for George IV, except for slight alterations to the halfpenny and farthing. It depicts Britannia helmeted and bearing a trident. She bears a shield bearing the Union flag, above a rose, shamrock and thistle representing England, Ireland and Scotland. The Latin inscription with William's royal titles is spread between the two sides.

== Reaction ==
The numismatist and author Richard Sainthill described Wyon's work, "There is equally great expression in Mr. Wyon's series of the coins of George IV and William IV ... in the latter, the placid, natural, quiet aspect of a straightforward, well-intentioned man. In both, the workmanship is admirable. The truth with which each line and muscle is represented, and the softness with which all the parts melt into each other, leave nothing to be desired." One of King William's friends viewed a sovereign with the king's head on it, and upon seeing what the Royal Mint Museum described as a "realistic likeness" of the king, stated, "It is the old boy himself!"

The numismatist William Till commented in an 1835 article, "Of our present deservedly popular Monarch we have a beautiful Penny by Wyon. But we meet with nothing extra: we have the King and nothing but the King, as like as it is possible to convey a portrait on a medal; no laurel crown, but the head engraved from a bust from nature, alike creditable to the Sovereign's taste and the artist's ability." Wyon's bust of William also appears on the King's coronation medal.

== Production ==
There were no basic numismatic innovations at the Royal Mint during William's reign. However, a start was made on reform of the Royal Mint's administration, then run for private profit by the Company of Moneyers. In 1830 there was a reduction by a third of the salary of the Master of the Mint. Abolition of the automatic funding of the Royal Mint from seignorage and from a payment from the consolidated fund followed in April 1837, ending a subsidy which had begun when Sir Isaac Newton was Master of the Mint a century earlier. Thereafter, funding of the Royal Mint was subject to an annual parliamentary vote. A committee on the establishment of the Mint was appointed to consider further reform, but its parliamentary mandate expired with the end of the parliamentary session, shortened by the death of the King.

No five pound pieces were struck, with the coin largest in value being the double sovereign, which was only minted for the 1831 proof set. Sketches were prepared by Wyon for a five-pound piece in 1833, and shown to the King, who approved generally but the project seems to have gone no further. The sixpence and half sovereign were the same size; to prevent confusion and counterfeiting, the half sovereign was made smaller in diameter in 1834, though it remained the same weight. This proved unpopular and was reversed the following year, with 120,000 coins recalled and melted, likely because of complaints that the smaller half sovereign was too close in diameter to the old third guinea. At the urging of the politician Joseph Hume, the fourpence was struck beginning in 1836. The threepence, struck for use in Britain beginning in 1845, would prove more popular and supplant it.

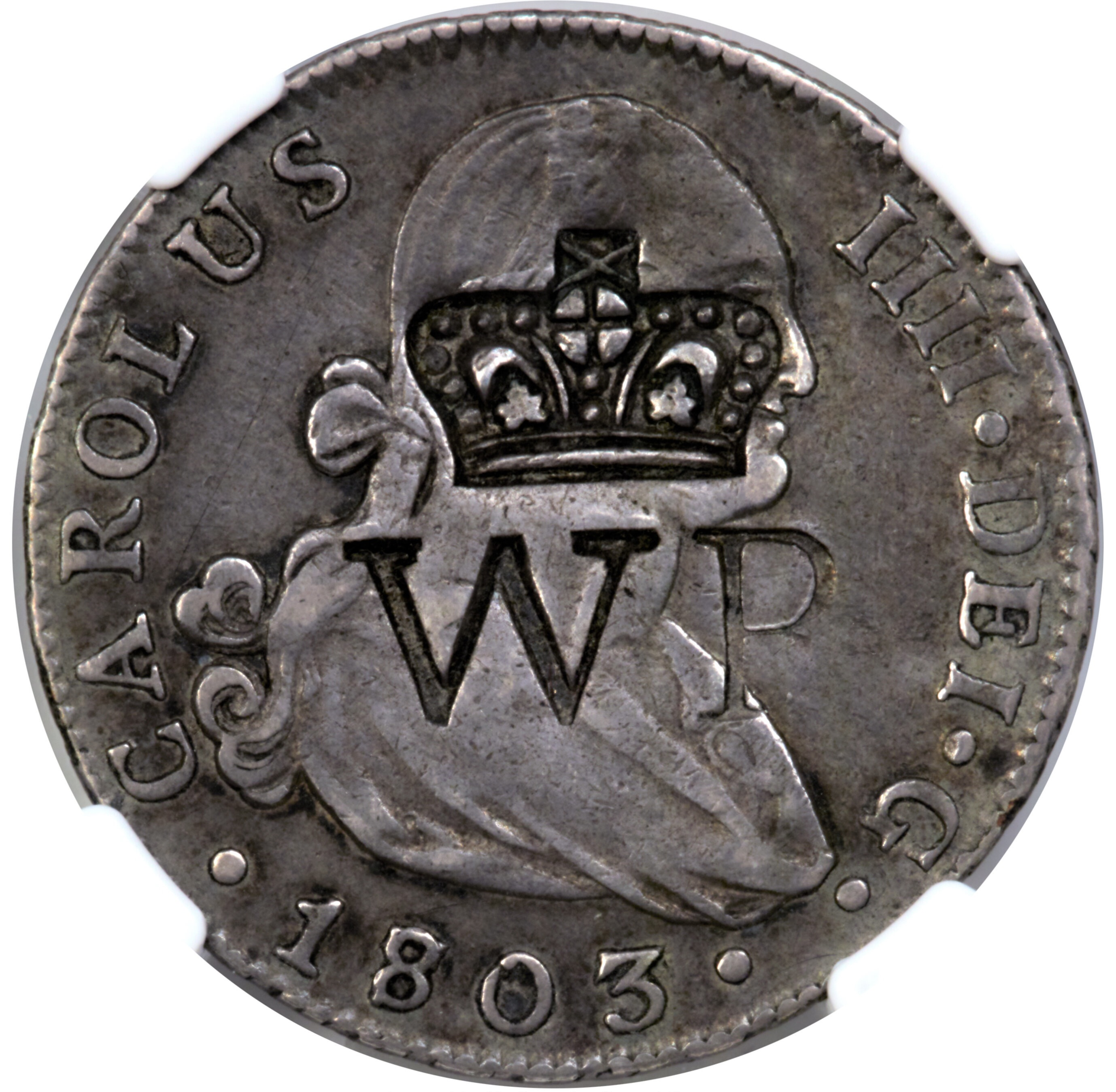
Spanish colonial 2 reales counterstamped for use in Sierra Leone.

It was British policy, summarised in an 1825 order in council, to have the colonies use sterling to the extent practical, regardless of local traditions, and by the 1830s, the pound was an imperial currency. The abolition of slavery in the West Indies in the 1830s led to an increased need for small change there and the threepence (only intended for colonial use) and the three halfpence were issued for use there, their production authorised by a Treasury letter dated 12 September 1834.

Both coins were imported into Jamaica, and the three halfpence, dubbed "a quatty", was repeatedly resupplied and was still popular in the 1890s. Trinidad, which still used the Spanish colonial real, refused importation of the new coins, returning them to the colony's London agent and stating that they were "unsuitable and not such as required". In 1835, the governor of the African colony of Sierra Leone requested a supply of the new coins to supplement a currency of counterstamped colonial reales. After discussion, £1,000 worth of the threepence and three halfpence were sent there in 1836, as "best calculated to benefit the liberated African population", as the colonial government put it. They proved unpopular and poured back to the colonial government. Additional supplies were nevertheless sent, and the Spanish pieces demonetised in 1839. Both the threepence and three halfpence were also sent to Mauritius beginning in 1837 to alleviate a shortage of small change there, but failed to wean the island from the Indian rupee system.

The third farthing was struck for issuance in Malta, while the half farthing was minted for use in Ceylon. Those fractional farthings were issued for use in colonies where the standard of living was lower than in Britain. The third farthing was a reaction to the 1825 order in council as applied in Malta, where the farthing was made equivalent to three grani, and the governor urged the issuance of a coin equivalent to one grano, "as many articles of primary necessity are often sold here to the value of one grano". The third farthing was authorised in 1827. The half farthing was later (1842) made current in Britain. Even then, it saw little use there.

Mintages were low during parts of William's reign, with as few as 1,500,000 coins struck by the Royal Mint in some years, down from a total in excess of 40,000,000 in 1826. Most denominations were issued in 1831, if only as part of the proof set, but only the sovereign and Maundy coinage were issued to the public dated 1832 or 1833. All denominations intended for circulation in Britain (from the farthing to the sovereign) were struck dated 1834, and most years after that until the end of William's reign in 1837. The penny and halfpenny were only issued dated 1831, 1834 and 1837.

== Aftermath ==
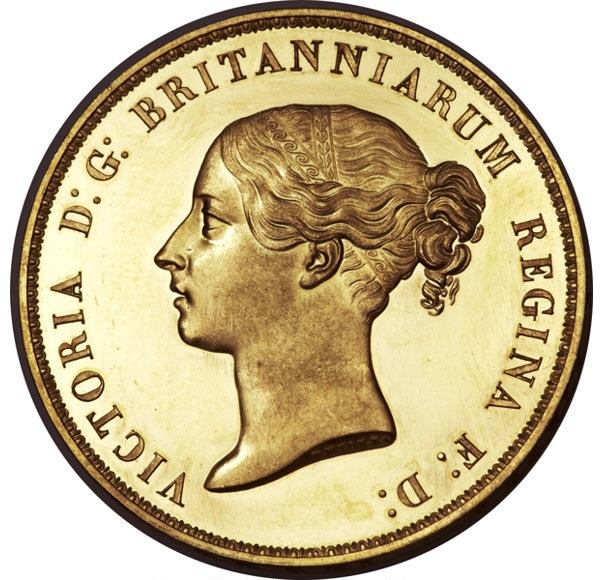
Wyon's Young Head coinage of Victoria replaced William's coinage.

King William IV died on 20 June 1837; his niece, Victoria, was his successor. This meant that a new coinage would be prepared. Victoria sat for Wyon at Windsor Castle on 25 August 1837, two months after she became queen, then again the following day and again two days after that. Victoria sat again for him on 15 and 16 September.

Designs for the new coinage, together with an example of the sovereign coin, were submitted to Victoria by the Master of the Mint, Henry Labouchere, on 15 February 1838. The required designs had been described by an order in council dated 26 July 1837. They were approved on 26 February 1838.

The new coinage was subject to several delays. Merlen, who engraved the reverses of the precious metal coins (the coppers were engraved by Wyon), was slow to complete his work. He did not complete the work for all denominations until 1839. The first of Victoria's coins to be released were dated 1838.

== The William IV coinage ==
List of William IV coins
Denomination	Obverse	Reverse	Reverse designer and date of design if earlier	Years struck with William IV obverse; later usage of reverse
Double sovereign	Gold coin with a man head facing right	Gold coin with a coat of arms	Jean Baptiste Merlen	1831
Sovereign	Gold coin with a man's head facing right	Gold coin with a coat of arms	Jean Baptiste Merlen	1831–1833, 1834–1837
Half sovereign	Gold coin with a man's head facing right	Gold coin with a coat of arms	Jean Baptiste Merlen	1831, 1834–1837
Crown	Silver coin with a man's head facing right	Silver coin with a coat of arms	Jean Baptiste Merlen	1831, 1832, 1834
Half crown	Silver coin with a man's head facing right	Silver coin with a coat of arms	Jean Baptiste Merlen	1831, 1834–1837
Shilling	Silver coin with a man's head facing right	Silver coin with its value in a wreath	Jean Baptiste Merlen	1831, 1834–1837; last used in 1901.
Sixpence	Silver coin with a man's head facing right	Silver coin with its value in a wreath	Jean Baptiste Merlen	1831, 1834–1837; last used in 1910.
Fourpence (groat)	Silver coin with a man's head facing right	Silver coin with a rendering of Britannia	William Wyon	1836, 1837; last used in 1888
Threepence	Silver coin with a man's head facing right	Silver coin with a number in a wreath	Jean Baptiste Merlen (1822)	1834–1837; last used in 1926.
Maundy coinage	Silver coins with a man's head facing right	Silver coins with a number in a wreath	Jean Baptiste Merlen (1822)	1831–1837; last used in 2025.
Three halfpence	Silver coin with a man's head facing right	Silver coin with a number in a wreath	Jean Baptiste Merlen	1834–1837
Penny	Copper coin with a man's head facing right	Copper coin with a rendering of Britannia	William Wyon (1825)	1831, 1834, 1837 ; last used in 1860.
Halfpenny	Copper coin with a man's head facing right	Copper coin with a rendering of Britannia	William Wyon (1825)	1831, 1834, 1837; last used in 1860.
Farthing	Copper coin with a man's head facing right	Copper coin with a rendering of Britannia	William Wyon (1826)	1831, 1834–1837; last used in 1860.
Half farthing	Copper coin with a man's head facing right	Copper coin with a rendering of Britannia	William Wyon (1828)	1837
Third farthing	Copper coin with a man's head facing right	Copper coin with a rendering of Britannia	William Wyon (1827)	1835; last used in 1844.

== Sources ==
- Bennett, Graham (October 2013). "William Wyon—Master Engraver". Coin News. 53 (10): 47–48. ISSN 0958-1391.
- Celtel, André & Gullbekk, Svein H. (2006). The Sovereign and its Golden Antecedents. Monetarius. ISBN 978-82-996755-6-7.
- Chalmers, Robert (1893). A History of Currency in the British Colonies. Her Majesty's Stationery Office. OCLC 2677317.
- Dyer, Graham P. & Gaspar, Peter P. (1992). "Reform, the New Technology and Tower Hill". In Challis, Christopher Edgar Challis (ed.). A New History of the Royal Mint. Cambridge University Press. pp. 398–606. ISBN 978-0-521-24026-0.
- Forrer, Leonard (1909). Biographical Dictionary of Medallists. Vol. IV. Spink & Son. OCLC 312571442.
- Jones, Mark (2025). William Wyon. Spink & Son. ISBN 978-1-912667-79-6.
- Linecar, Howard (1977). British Coin Designs and Designers. G. Bell & Sons Ltd. ISBN 978-0-7135-1931-0.
- Lobel, Richard, ed. (1999) [1995]. Coincraft's Standard Catalogue English & UK Coins 1066 to Date (5th ed.). Standard Catalogue Publishers. ISBN 978-0-9526228-8-8.
- Marsh, Michael A. (2017) [1980]. The Gold Sovereign (revised ed.). Token Publishing. ISBN 978-1-908828-36-1.
- Peck, C. Wilson (1960). English Copper, Tin and Bronze Coins in the British Museum 1558–1958. Trustees of the British Museum. OCLC 906173180. SBN 7141-0813-8.
- Ruding, Rogers (1840) [1819]. Supplement to the Annals of the Coinage of Britain. Vol. 2 (Third ed.). John Hearne. OCLC 771752141.
- Seaby, Peter (1985). The Story of British Coinage. B. A. Seaby. ISBN 0-900652-74-8.
- Spink & Son (2022). Coins of England and the United Kingdom, Predecimal Issues 2023 (58th ed.). Spink & Son. ISBN 978-1-912667-91-8.
- Zimmerman, Walter (May 1971). "The English Shilling: Its History and Portrature". The Numismatist. 84 (5): 643–656.
