= Double sovereign =

British gold coin

- United Kingdom
- Value: £2.00 pound sterling
- Mass: 15.976 g
- Diameter: 28.40 mm
- Composition: .917 gold (22 carat)
- Gold: 0.4708 troy oz
- Years of minting: 1820, 1823–1826, 1831, 1887, 1893, 1902, 1911, 1937, 1953, 1980, 1982–1983, 1985, 1987–1993, 1996, 1998, 2000, 2002–present
- Mint marks: S (1887 and 1902 only)

Obverse
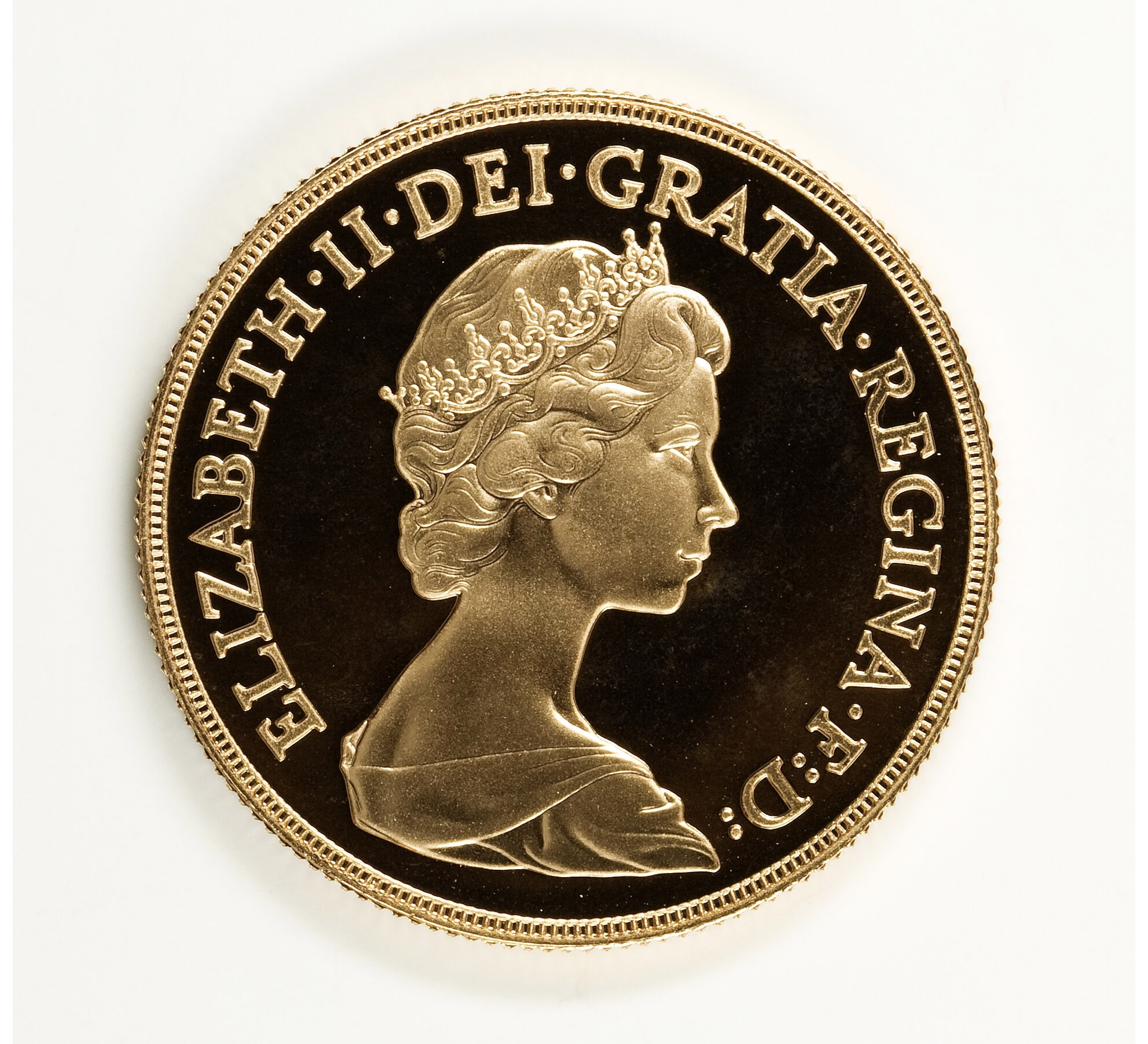
- Design: Reigning British monarch (Elizabeth II shown)

Reverse
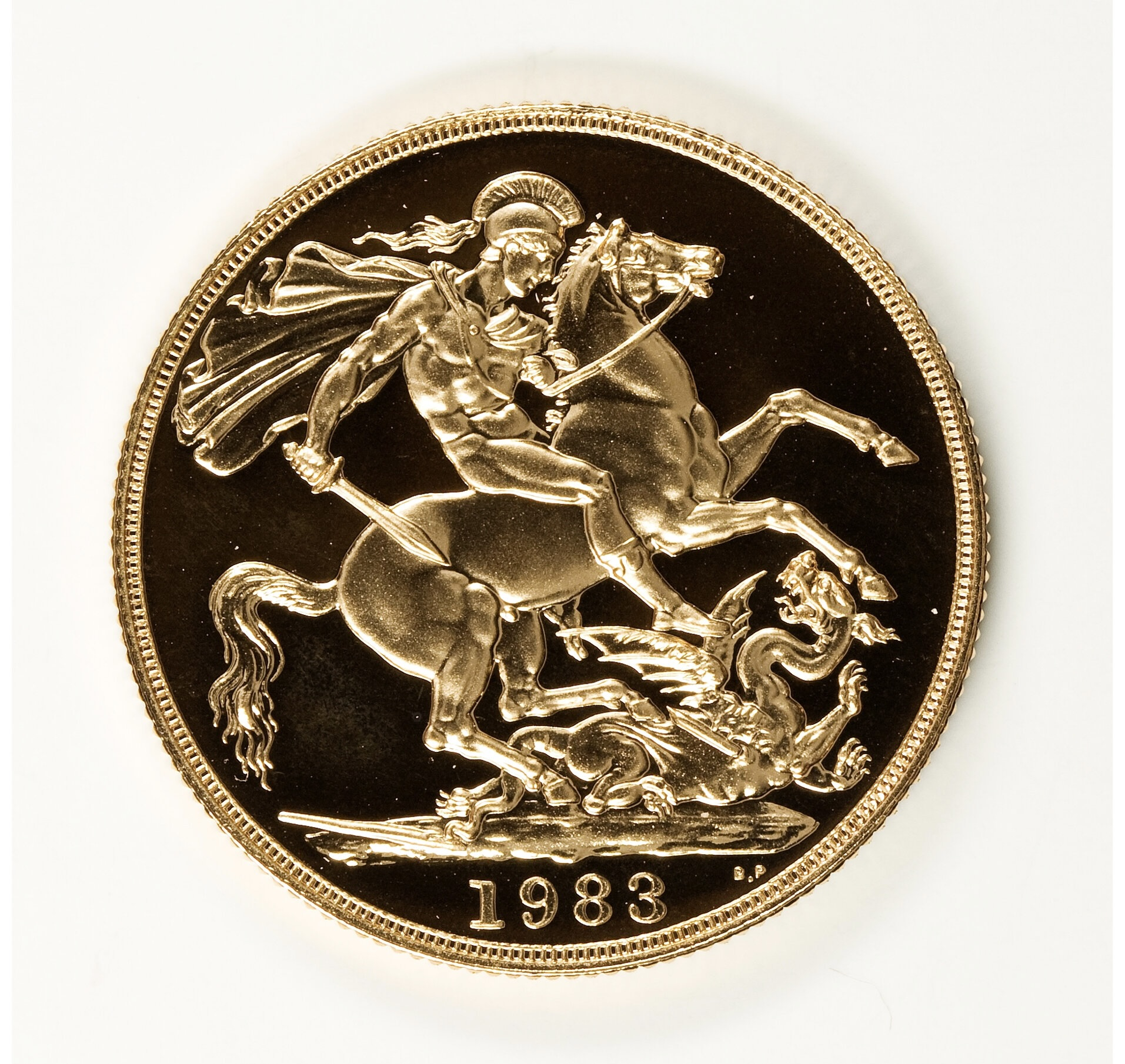
- Design: Saint George and the Dragon
- Designer: Benedetto Pistrucci
- Design date: 1817 (first used on double sovereign in 1820)

The double sovereign is a British sterling gold coin with a nominal value of two pounds sterling (£2). (Note: This is only the face value as a denomination of sterling; the gold within the coin is worth significantly more.) Rarely issued in the first 150 years after its debut in 1820, it never had a significant presence in circulation. It became a collector and bullion coin, and has been struck most years since 1980. It features the reigning monarch on its obverse and, most often, Benedetto Pistrucci's depiction of Saint George and the Dragon on the reverse.

The double sovereign was first minted in 1820 and depicted George III, but this issue never entered circulation, instead being considered a pattern coin. In the following century and a half, it was most often issued to mark the beginning of a new reign, or the institution of a new coinage portrait of the reigning monarch. These were mostly proof coins; the denomination was issued for circulation in only four years. Few examples that are worn from commercial use can be found.

Since 1980, the double sovereign has been sold as a collector's coin by the Royal Mint. In some years it was not issued, and the Royal Mint instead placed gold versions of the commemorative £2 piece in the gold proof sets.

== Origins and early striking ==
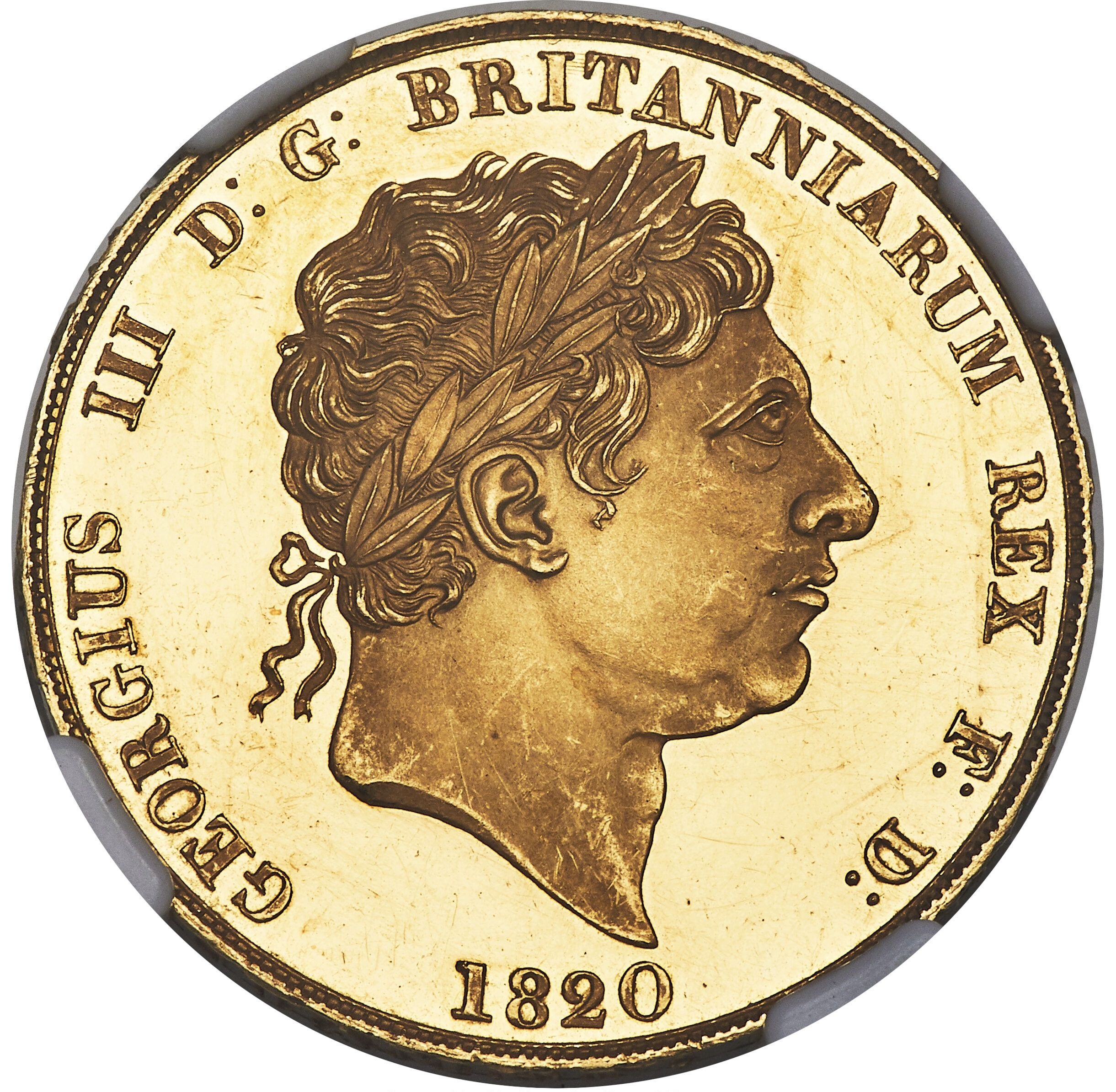
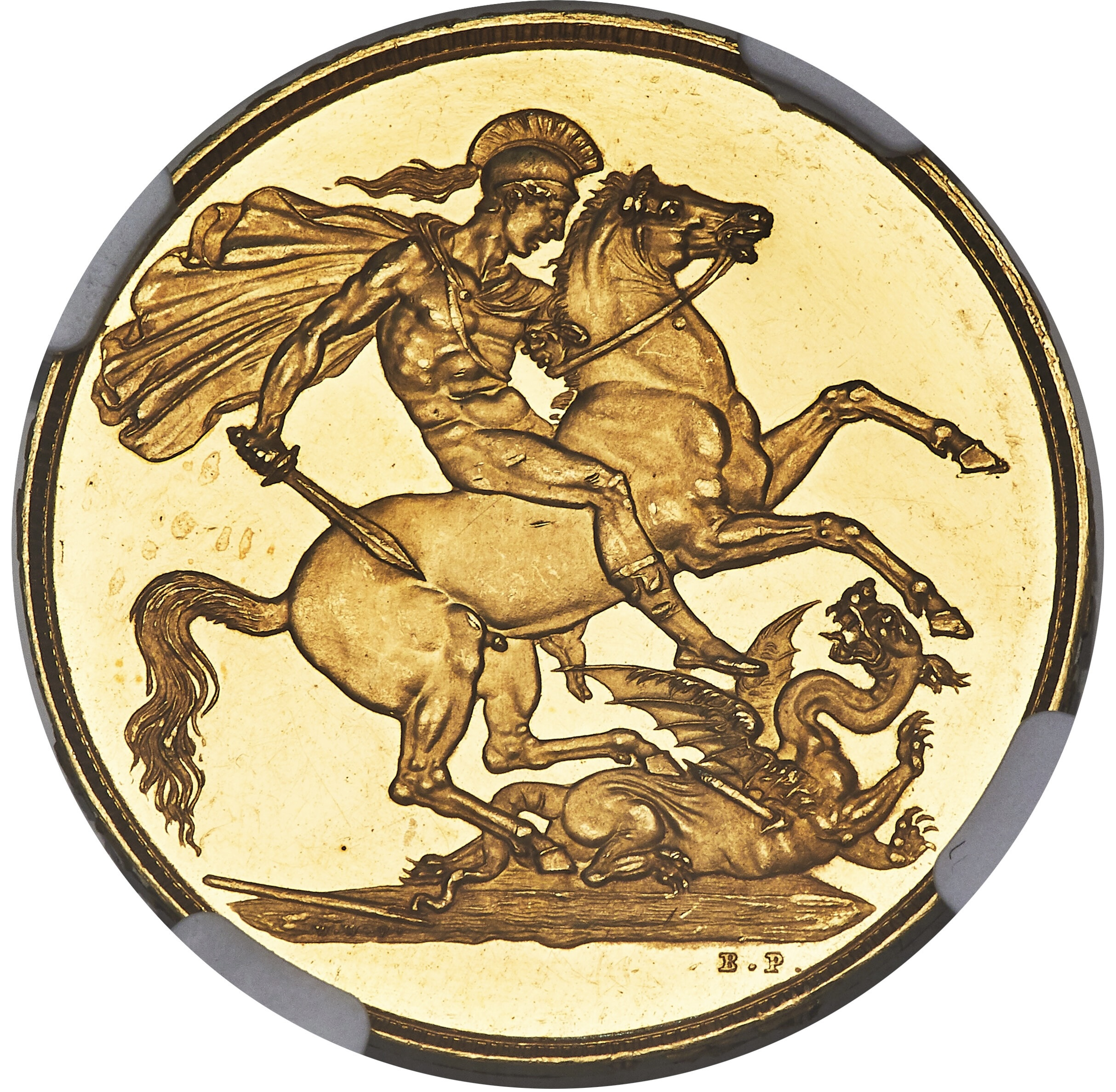
George III double sovereign

After the Napoleonic Wars, Parliament, by the Coinage Act 1816, placed Britain officially on the gold standard, with the pound to be defined as a given quantity of gold. Almost every speaker in the parliamentary debates supported having a coin valued at twenty shillings, rather than continuing to use the guinea, valued at twenty-one shillings. Nevertheless, the Coinage Act did not specify which coins the Mint should strike.

A committee of the Privy Council recommended gold coins of ten shillings, twenty shillings, two pounds and five pounds be issued, and this was accepted by George, Prince Regent on 3 August 1816. The twenty-shilling (one pound) piece was named a sovereign, with the resurrection of the old name possibly promoted by antiquarians with numismatic interests. The sovereign and half sovereign were both first issued in 1817, but there was initially no striking of the two larger coins. Since 1754, there had been no issuance of coins more valuable than a guinea intended for general circulation; the need for higher value tender had been met by banknotes. The Saint George and the Dragon design was suggested as an appropriate motif for the sovereign by its creator, Benedetto Pistrucci, based on a cameo he had carved. Sir Joseph Banks also recommended to William Wellesley-Pole, the Master of the Mint, that Pistrucci's design be adapted for use on the coinage.

In December 1819, possibly because of the decline in the health of King George III (r. 1760–1820), Wellesley-Pole instructed Pistrucci, who was then acting as chief engraver of the Royal Mint, to prepare dies for the double sovereign (two pounds) and the five-pound piece. Nineteenth-century numismatic writer Edward Hawkings portrayed this as a race against time to complete the dies before George died, which he related was won by the Royal Mint's craftsmen; later researchers have found the king died before the new coins were ready. The double sovereign, designed by Pistrucci, depicts the right-facing bust of the king with the legend GEORGIUS III D G BRITANNIAR REX F D (George III by the Grace of God King of the Britains, Defender of the Faith) and the date, while the reverse shows Pistrucci's George and Dragon design with no legend or date. This design had first appeared on the sovereign in 1817, surrounded by a Garter. The reverse design has Pistrucci's initials at the lower right, whilst lettering on the edge states DECUS ET TUTAMEN ANNO REGNI LX (An ornament and a safeguard; in the sixtieth year of the reign). A total of 60 pieces are reported to have been struck.

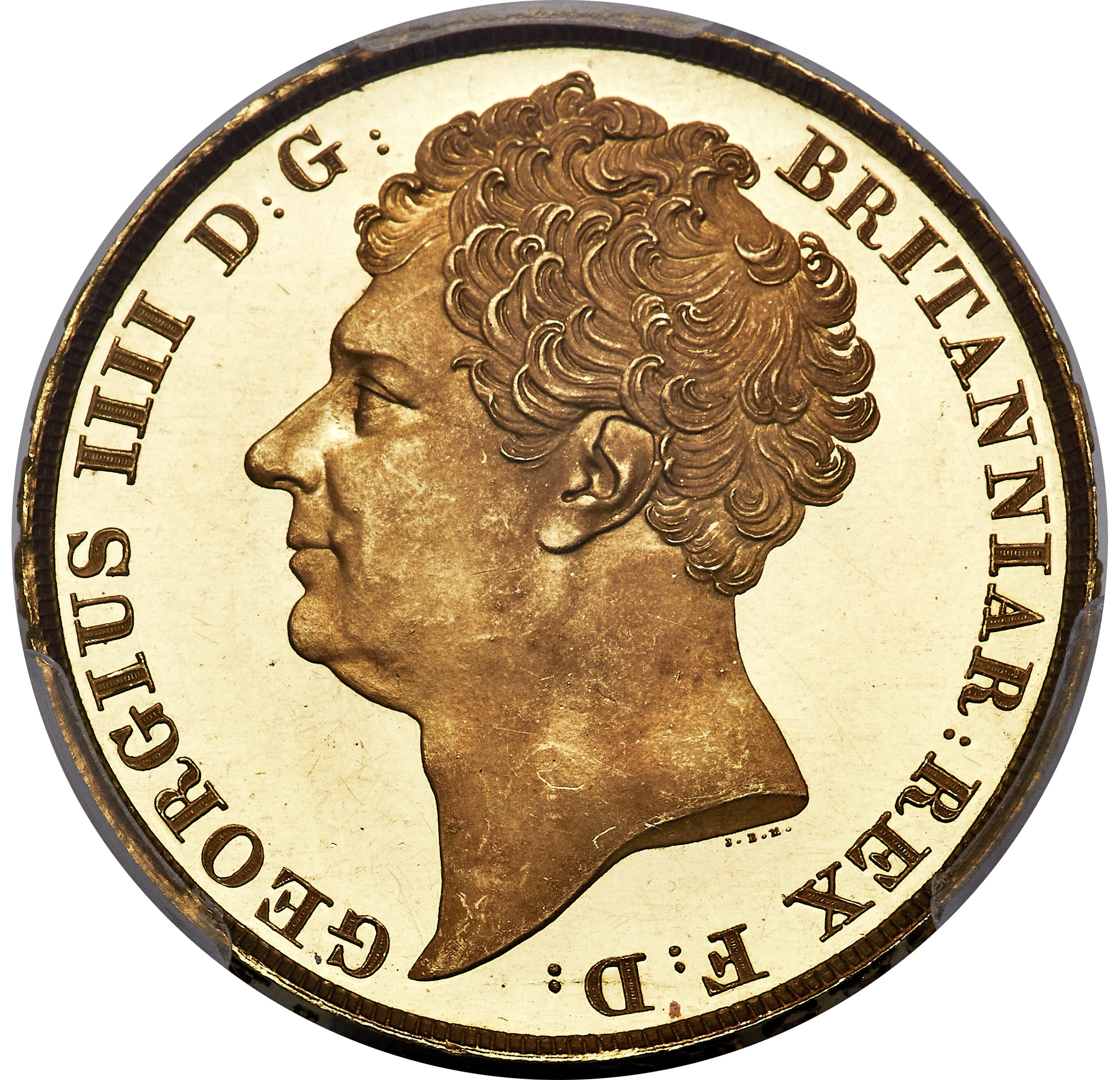
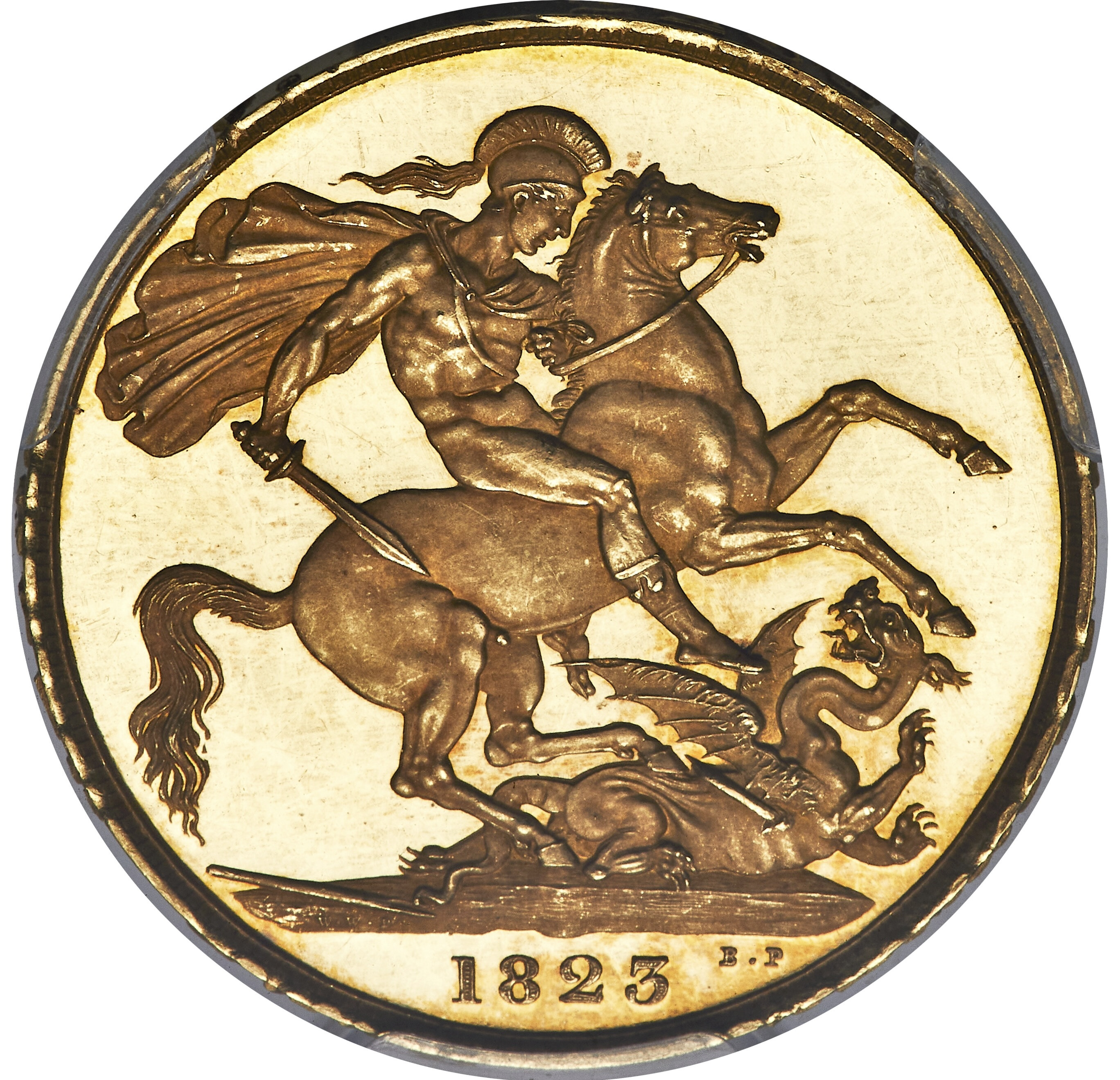
George IV double sovereign

In 1823, Pistrucci's reverse was used again on the double sovereign, joined with an obverse bust of the new king, George IV (r. 1820–1830) by Jean Baptiste Merlen based on a bust by Sir Francis Chantrey; believing he should not be called upon to adapt the work of another artist, Pistrucci had refused to convert Chantrey's bust to a coin. The double sovereign had the same inscription around the monarch's head as in 1820 except IIII was substituted for III, and the date was moved to the reverse. The 1823 issue had the same edge inscription as the 1820 piece, except the Roman numeral was IV (fourth [year of the reign]) for 1823 issues. Thus, the same number, 4, is rendered in two different ways as Roman numerals on the same coin.

The 1824, 1825 and 1826 proof coins feature a smaller head of the king, by William Wyon, with the legend GEORGIUS IV DEI GRATIA (George IV by the grace of God ...) and the date, while the reverse (by Merlen) shows a crowned shield within a mantle cape with the legend BRITANNIARUM REX FID DEF (King of the Britains, defender of the faith). The 1824 issue has the edge inscription DECUS ET TUTAMEN ANNO REGNI QUINTO (An ornament and a safeguard; in the fifth year of the reign). The 1825 issue has no edge inscription, while the 1826 has the same as 1824, but the final word is changed to SEPTIMO (seventh). Of the four George IV issues, only the 1823 issue was for circulation, the others being struck in small numbers as proof coins, with the 1826 part of the proof set of that year.

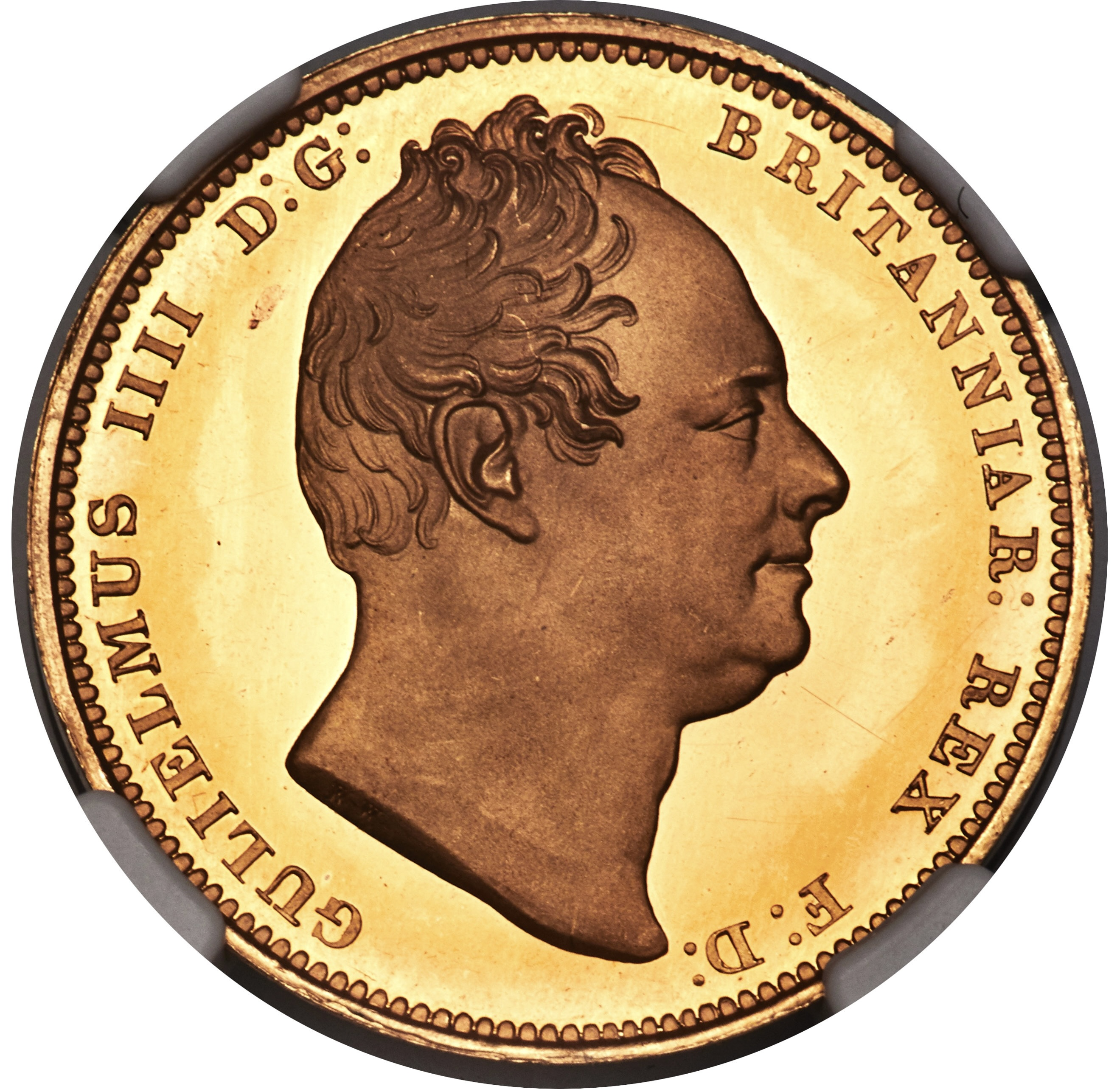
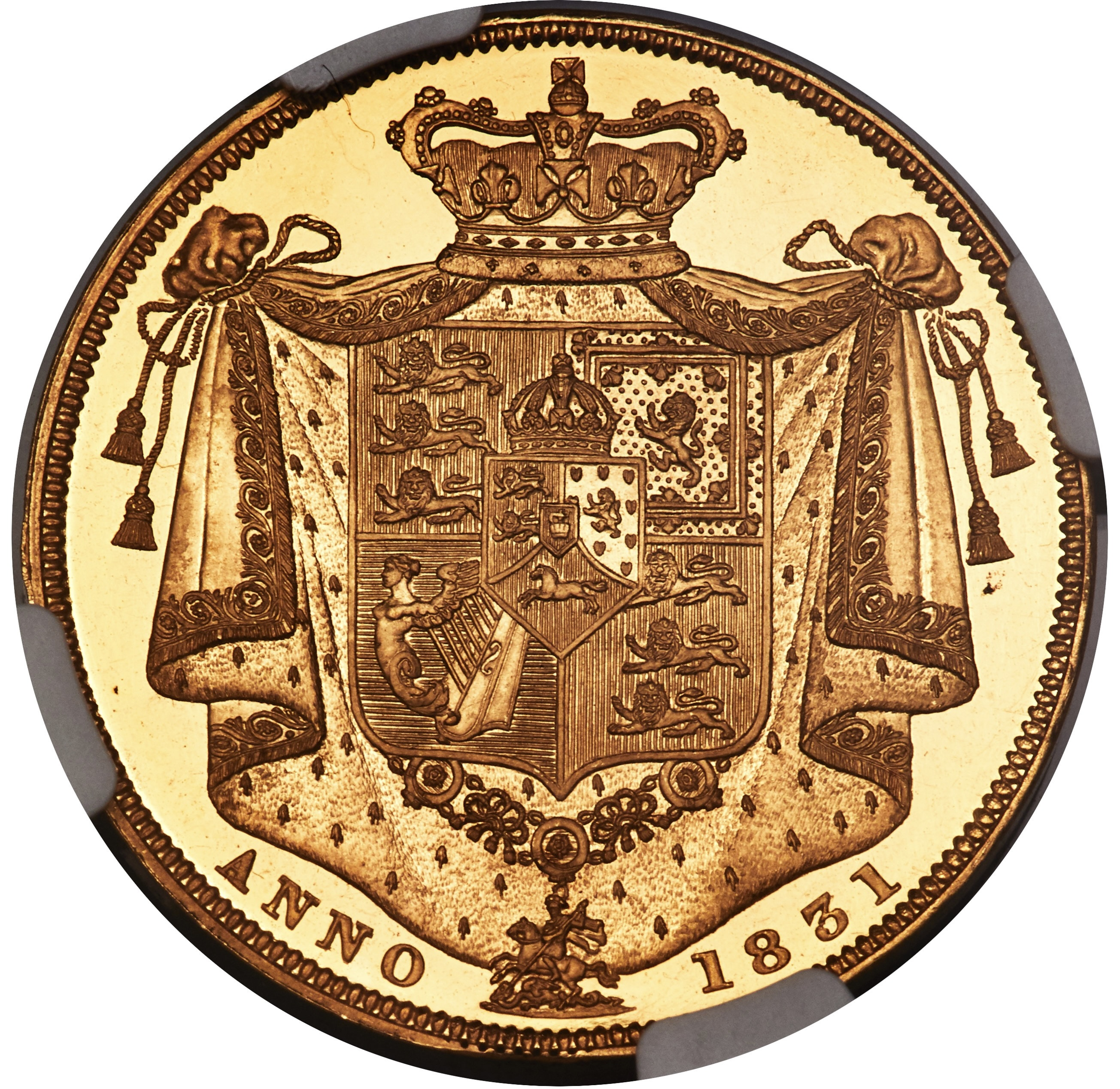
William IV double sovereign

In 1831, a proof coin of this denomination was produced as part of the proof set marking the new coinage of King William IV (r. 1830–1837). The obverse, by Wyon based on a bust by Chantrey, shows a right-facing head of the king with the legend GULIELMUS IIII D G BRITANNIAR REX F D (William IV by the Grace of God King of the Britains, Defender of the Faith), while the reverse, by Merlen, shows a crowned shield with the legend ANNO 1831 (in the year 1831). There is no edge inscription.

== Victorian and early 20th century issues ==
After 1831, the double sovereign was not struck again until 1887. For reasons unknown, it was not struck as part of the proof sets of 1839 or 1853. Kevin Clancy of the Royal Mint notes the gap of over a half century and deems it an illustration of how small a part the two-pound and five-pound pieces played in the everyday life of the Victorian era. According to the numismatist G. P. Dyer, "two-pound and five-pound pieces later played so small and infrequent a part that in 1893 they could be regarded as hardly more than ornaments". Few double sovereigns that are examined show any signs of circulation, and when they do, they are from the four years in which the denomination was struck for commerce: 1823, 1887, 1893 and 1902.

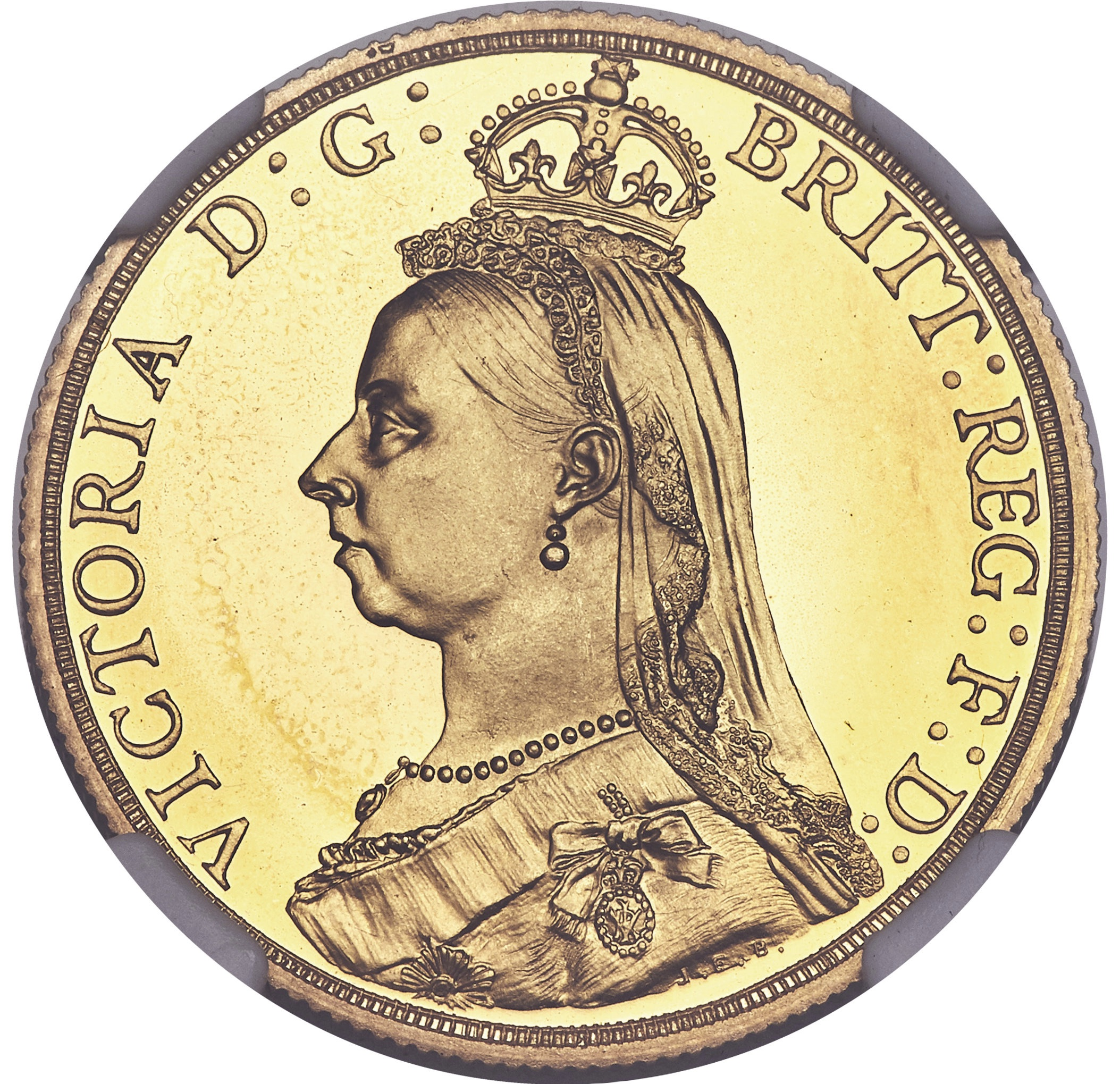
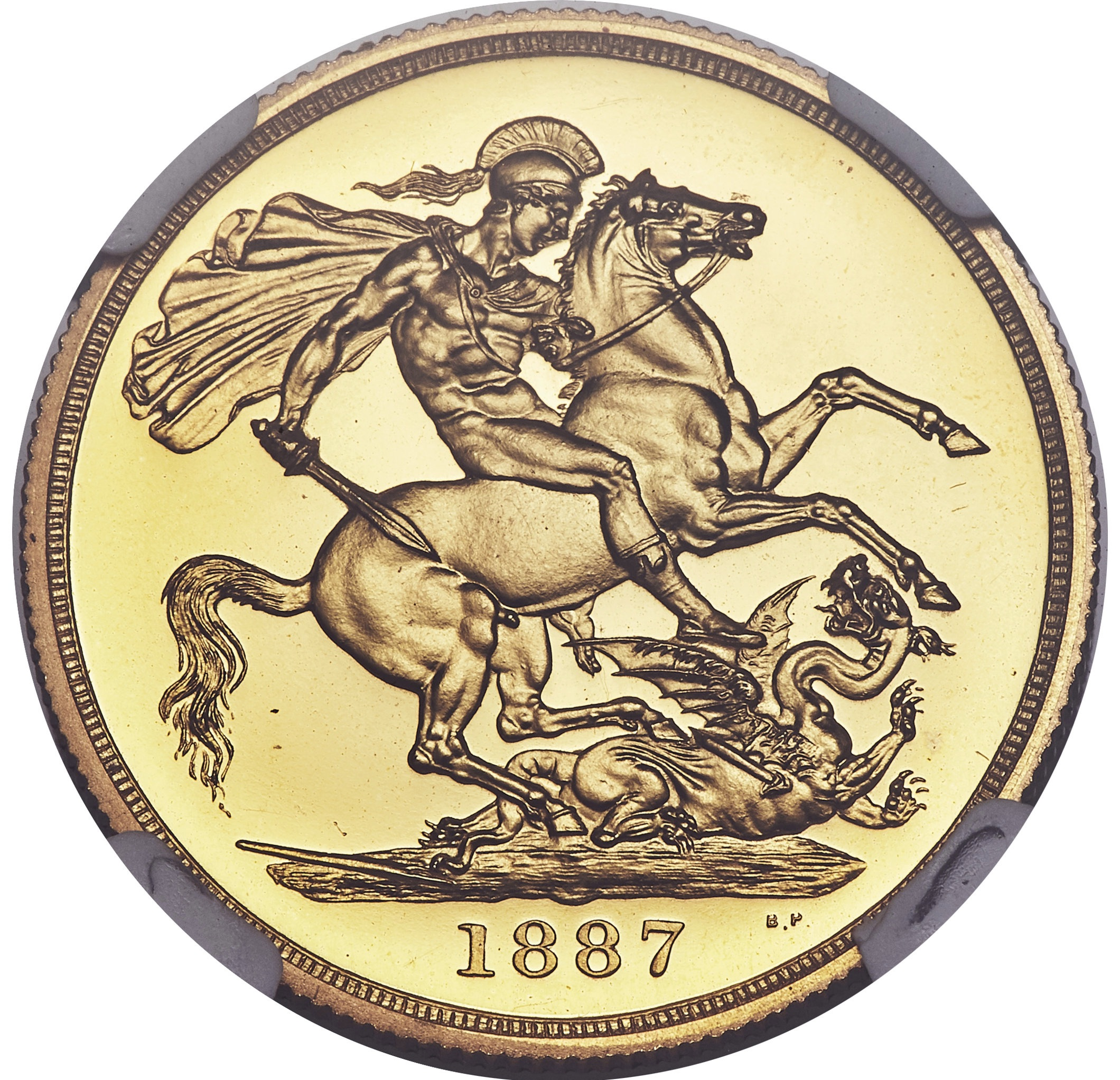
1887 double sovereign (part of the Jubilee coinage)

In 1887, the double sovereign was struck as part of the Jubilee coinage, with an obverse depicting Queen Victoria (r. 1837–1901) by Joseph Boehm and Pistrucci's George and Dragon reverse. This coin was available both in uncirculated condition and as a proof coin. Richard Lobel, in his Coincraft's Standard Catalogue of English and UK Coins, deems the 1887 issue the "best known and most popular example of this denomination", something borne out by its mintage of 91,345 in uncirculated and 797 in proof, the highest of any double sovereign. It bears the inscription, on the obverse, of VICTORIA D G BRIT REG F D (Victoria, by the Grace of God, Queen of the Britains, Defender of the Faith). The use of Pistrucci's design on the gold coinage did not win universal acclaim; the Church Times stated, "We cannot join in the applause which has been bestowed on the George of Pistrucci, which is retained for the sovereign. It is not likely that anyone going out to fight dragons would forget to put on any clothes except a helmet, a cloak, and a pair of shoes."

On 26 September 1887, two sets of dies, mint marked "S", were sent from the London premises of the Royal Mint to the Sydney Mint. It is thought that the Sydney Mint only struck coins to order, and few double sovereigns were called for. After that mint closed at the end of 1926, its equipment, including the 1887 dies, was sent to the Melbourne Mint, where additional specimens were struck from the original dies. The total mintage of the 1887-S double sovereign is believed to be 28.

The Jubilee coinage was replaced by the Old Head coinage beginning in 1893, with the double sovereign having an obverse portrait of Victoria by Thomas Brock paired with Pistrucci's reverse. The coin was issued that year both in uncirculated (mintage 52,212) and in proof (mintage 773). The inscription for this issue is VICTORIA DEI GRA BRITT REGINA FID DEF IND IMP (Victoria by the Grace of God, Queen of the Britains, Defender of the Faith, Empress of India). Victoria had been lobbying since 1888 for her title as empress of India, granted by the Royal Titles Act 1876, to be included on the coinage; on 12 February 1892, the Prime Minister, Lord Salisbury, wrote to her, "Your Majesty's Servants are of opinion that the title of Empress of India, indicating, as it does, Your Majesty's relation to far the larger portion of Your subjects, ought to appear on the coin, in the shape of the letters 'Ind Imp' or 'I.I.' or some such abbreviation." IND IMP, short for INDIAE IMPERATRIX or "Empress of India", thus appears on the 1893 issue.

Following the death of Queen Victoria in 1901, an effort was made to minimise the changes to the coinage, and no change was made to the reverse side of the gold coins, including the double sovereign. The gold coins were made legal tender effective 1 January 1902 by a proclamation dated 10 December 1901. The obverse showed a bust of Victoria's son and successor, Edward VII (r. 1901–1910), by George William de Saulles. The legend on the obverse reads EDWARDVS VII D G BRITT OMN REX F D IND IMP. (Edward VII, by the Grace of God King of all the Britains, Defender of the Faith, Emperor of India). The word OMN (short for omnium, meaning "of all"), was added after BRITT in recognition of the empire's assistance during the Boer War; these words last appeared on British coinage in 1953. (Note: They have appeared on British coins reproducing classic designs; for example, de Saulles's portrait of Edward VII was reproduced on low-mintage silver and gold coins in 2022. See Spink 2022b, pp. 376–378.) Struck in uncirculated and proof conditions, during Edward's reign the double sovereign was only issued in 1902. It was then also struck at Sydney in very small numbers.

Double sovereigns dated 1911 were struck as part of the coronation proof sets that year for George V (r. 1910–1936), but for uncertain reasons, no ordinary, non-proof specimens were coined. This was the only issuance of double sovereigns during that reign. These coins featured a bust of King George by Bertram Mackennal, Pistrucci's reverse and a legend that was unaltered except to substitute the name of the king, rendered as GEORGIVS V.

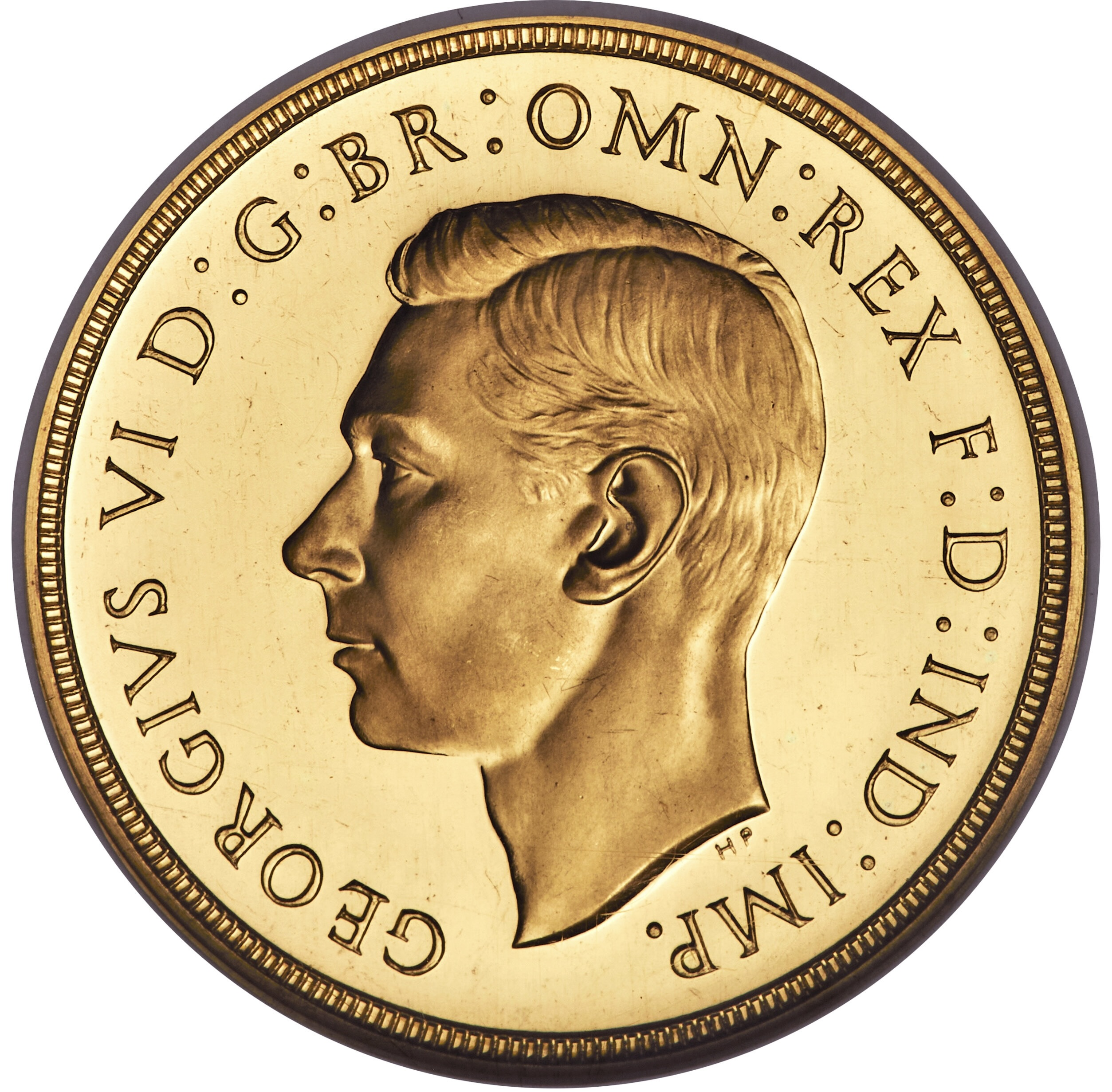
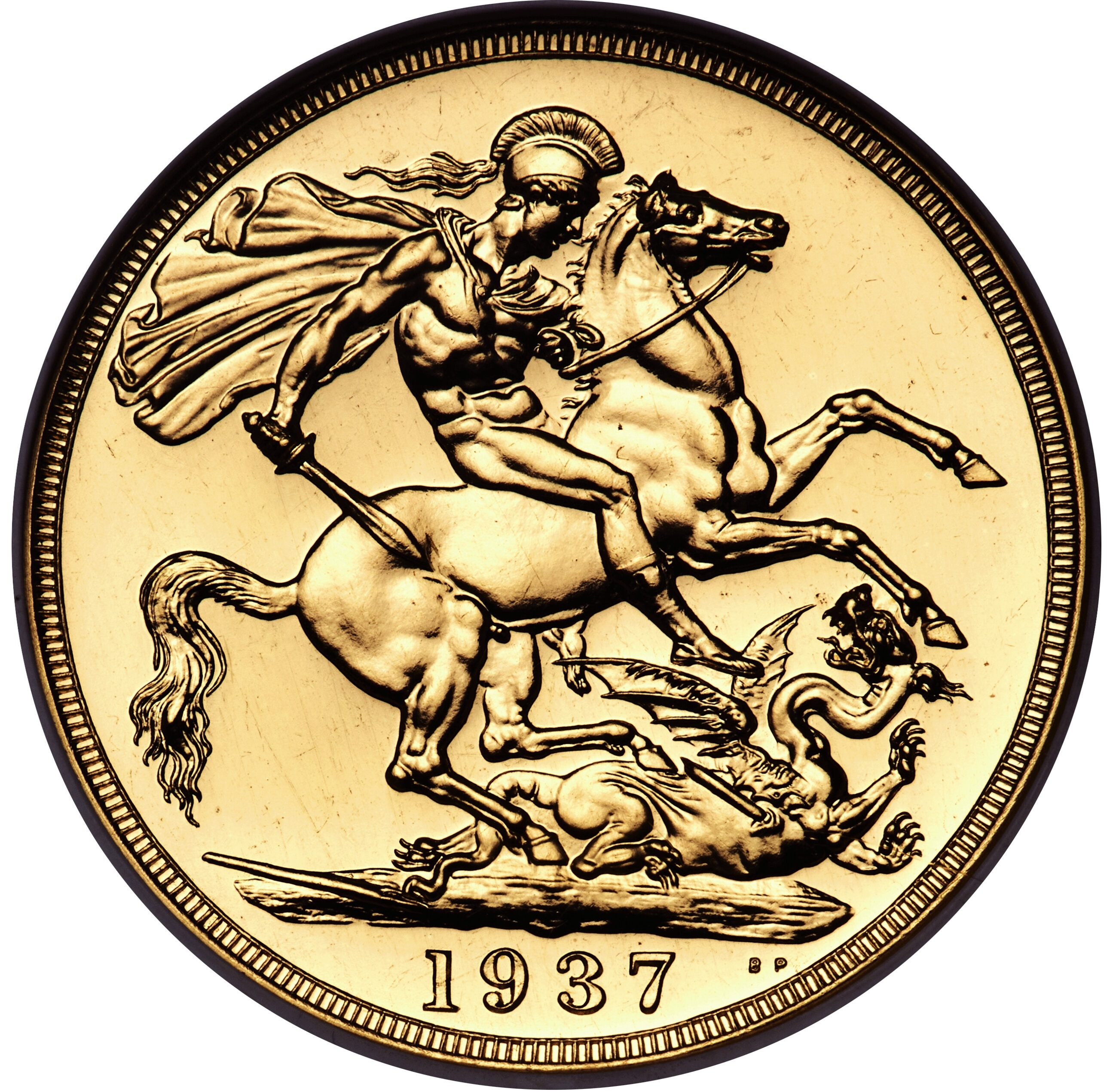
George VI double sovereign

Following the death of King George in 1936, preparations began for the coinage of his son and successor, Edward VIII (r. 1936–1936). The new king wanted his profile to face left on the new coinage, the same way as his father, which would break a tradition to reverse the direction on the commencement of a new reign which dated back to 1660. Following extensive correspondence between the king and the chancellor of the exchequer, Neville Chamberlain, Edward got his way, and pattern coins bearing a left-facing bust of the king by Thomas Humphrey Paget were struck. The Pistrucci reverse was used for the double sovereign, but the king's abdication in December 1936 ended the preparations. Edward later requested a set of the pattern coins prepared for him, but was refused by his brother and successor, George VI (r. 1936–1952). The legend on Edward's double sovereign was identical to that of the previous reign but for the name and date; a similar change was made for George VI, whose double sovereign features a left-facing bust by Paget and the Pistrucci reverse. This was only struck in 1937, with a plain edge, as part of the coronation proof sets.

== Elizabeth II and Charles III ==
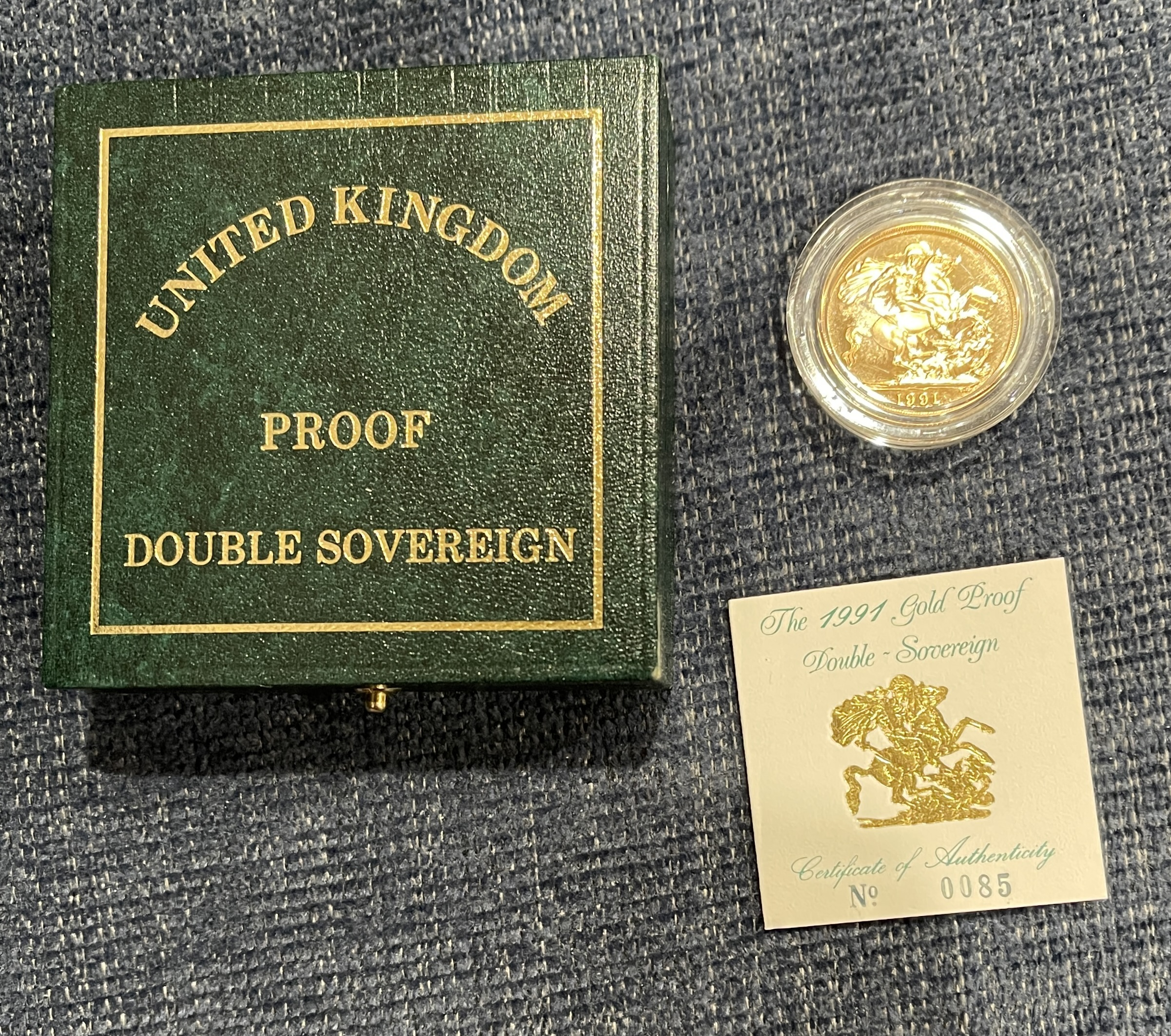
Proof 1991 double sovereign with box of issue and certificate of authenticity

The reign of Queen Elizabeth II (r. 1952–2022) saw a departure from the normal practice in issuing gold coinage. A small number of gold £2 pieces, with an obverse by Mary Gillick, were struck in 1953 in order to provide continuity of the series, but the coins were not released to the public, and were placed only in museums and in the Royal Collection. No further £2 gold pieces were struck until 1980. The 1953 strikings bore an obverse legend of ELIZABETH II DEI GRA BRITT OMN REGINA F D (Elizabeth II by the Grace of God Queen of all the Britains, Defender of the Faith) but this was changed after 1953, removing BRITT OMN (of all the Britains) and modifying the abbreviations. The omission was made to acknowledge the evolving British Commonwealth, which by then contained some republics.

The Royal Mint realised there was a market for sovereign coins, and began to sell them to collectors at well over face or bullion value. Since 1980, the double sovereign has been issued in most years. Coins from 1980 to 1983 (none were issued in 1981 or 1984) used the Arnold Machin effigy of Elizabeth, while the 1985–1996 coins used the Raphael Maklouf effigy and coins from 1998 to 2015 use the Ian Rank-Broadley effigy, mostly paired with Pistrucci's reverse, which was restored in 2009 to show additional detail of the dragon. No double sovereigns were issued in 1986, 1994, 1995, 1997, 1999 or 2001, years in which the coin's place in the gold proof set was taken by a gold version of a commemorative £2 piece issued that year. In 1989, the usual designs were replaced with a commemorative evoking the design of the original English sovereign of 1489, by Bernard Sindall.

The special designs for the reverse which were substituted for Pistrucci's included one for Elizabeth II's Golden Jubilee in 2002 (by Timothy Noad, depicting a crowned shield within a wreath), in 2005 (a more modern interpretation of the George and Dragon, also by Noad) and in 2012 for Elizabeth II's Diamond Jubilee (another modern interpretation of the George and Dragon, by Paul Day). Beginning with some 2015 issues, an obverse portrait of Elizabeth by Jody Clark was used, though in 2016, some coins bore a different portrait of the queen by James Butler. In 2017, a version with the original, 1817 sovereign design was struck. This was for the 200th anniversary of the modern sovereign.

In 2022, the Royal Mint struck double sovereigns with a reverse design by Noad showing an interpretation of the Royal Arms. This design, used for the sovereign and its multiples and fractions, was to mark the Platinum Jubilee of Elizabeth II. Later in the year, following the death of Elizabeth II, the Royal Mint issued memorial coins in the sovereign range, including the double sovereign, featuring an interpretation of the Royal Arms by Clark as the reverse, and for the obverse, the first coinage portrait of Elizabeth's successor, Charles III (r. 2022– ), by Martin Jennings. In addition to a left-facing bust of Charles, the obverse carried the wording CHARLES III DEI GRA REX FID DEF (Charles III by the Grace of God King, Defender of the Faith). In 2023, a double sovereign commemorating the coronation of Charles III was struck, with the obverse a crowned portrait of the king by Jennings and the reverse the Pistrucci George and Dragon. For 2024, Jennings' uncrowned portrait of Charles was paired with Pistrucci's reverse on each of the five sovereign denominations struck in proof, from the quarter sovereign to the five-pound piece. For 2025, Pistrucci's reverse was used on some coins, with others featuring Jean Baptiste Merlen's Royal Arms reverse, first used on the sovereign in 1825, for its 200th anniversary. For 2026, the sovereign range returned to yellow-coloured gold from rose and added security features amid strong demand and price rises for gold.

== See also ==
- Sovereign (British coin)
- Half sovereign
- Quarter sovereign
- Quintuple sovereign

== Bibliography ==
- Bull, Maurice (2023). English Gold Coinage. Vol. II. London, England: Spink & Son Ltd. ISBN 978-1-912667-72-7.
- Clancy, Kevin (2017) [2015]. A History of the Sovereign: Chief Coin of the World (second ed.). Llantrisant, Wales: Royal Mint Museum. ISBN 978-1-869917-00-5.
- Dyer, G. P. (1997). "Quarter-sovereigns and Other Small Gold Patterns of the Mid-Victorian Period" (PDF). British Numismatic Journal. 67: 73–83.
- Lant, Jeffrey L. (1973). "The Jubilee Coinage of 1887" (PDF). British Numismatic Journal. 43: 132–141.
- Lobel, Richard, ed. (1999) [1995]. Coincraft's Standard Catalogue English & UK Coins 1066 to Date (5th ed.). London, England: Standard Catalogue Publishers Ltd. ISBN 978-0-9526228-8-8.
- Marsh, Michael A. (2017) [1980]. The Gold Sovereign (revised ed.). Exeter, Devon, England: Token Publishing Ltd. ISBN 978-1-908828-36-1.
- Seaby, Peter (1985). The Story of British Coinage. London, England: B. A. Seaby Ltd. ISBN 978-0-900652-74-5.
- Skellern, Stephen (October 2013). "The Coinage of Edward VII, Part I". Coin News. 50 (10): 31–33.
- Spink & Son Ltd (2022). Coins of England and the United Kingdom, Predecimal Issues 2023 (58th ed.). London, England: Spink & Son Ltd. ISBN 978-1-912667-91-8.
- Spink & Son Ltd (2022). Coins of England and the United Kingdom, Decimal Issues 2023 (9th ed.). London, England: Spink & Son Ltd. ISBN 978-1-912667-93-2.
- Stocker, Mark (1996). "The Coinage of 1893" (PDF). British Numismatic Journal. 66: 67–86.
