= Five pounds (gold coin) =

Gold five pound coin

Quintuple sovereign
- United Kingdom
- Value: £5 pound sterling
- Mass: 39.94 g
- Diameter: 36.02 mm
- Edge: Varies
- Composition: .917 gold (22 carat)
- Gold: 1.1771 troy oz
- Years of minting: 1820, 1826, 1829, 1839, 1887, 1893, 1902, 1911, 1937, 1953, 1957, 1980–1982, 1984–present
- Mint marks: S (1887 and 1902 only). Found on exergue between design and date.

Obverse
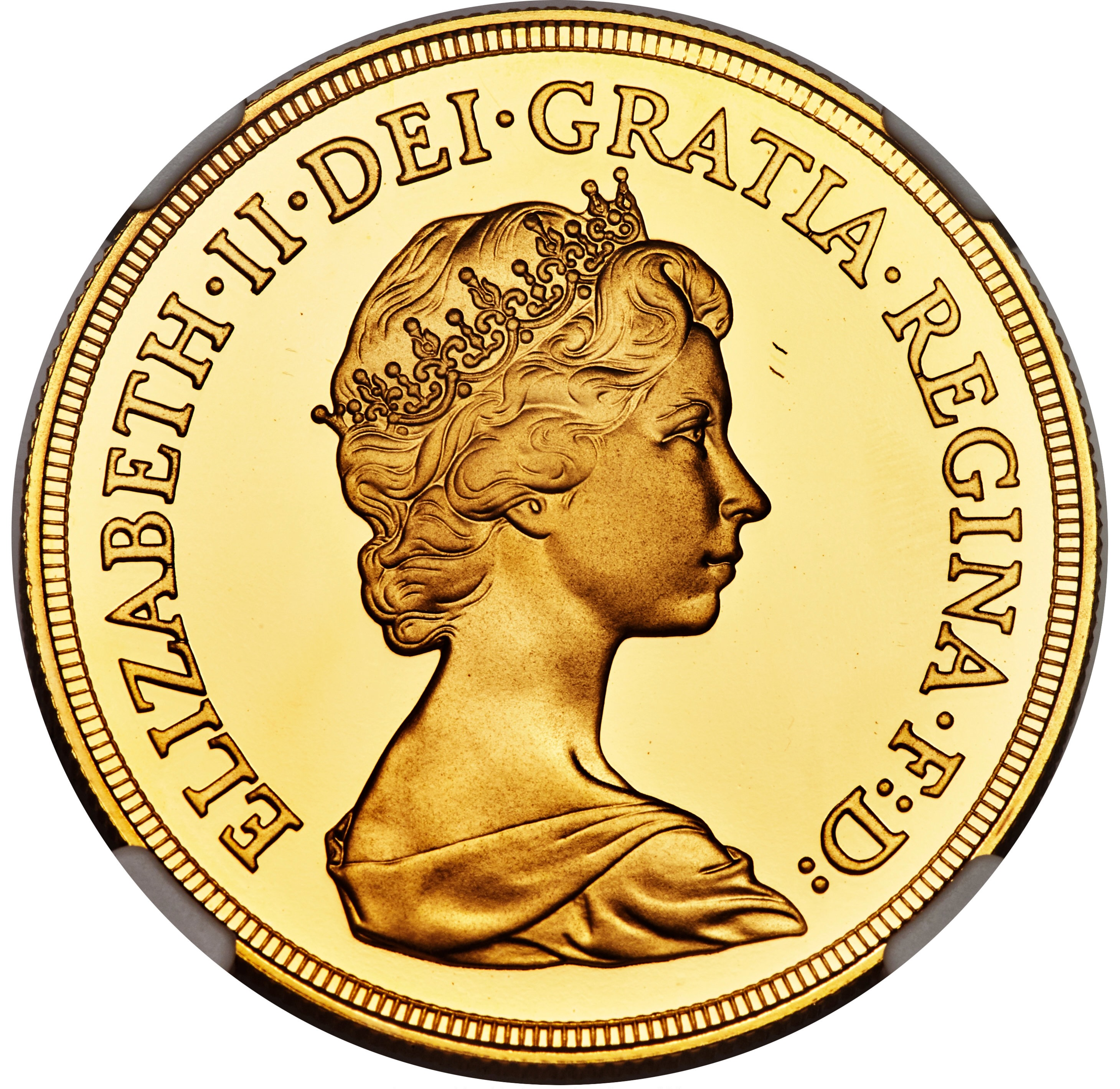
- Design: The reigning monarch (1984 coin showing Elizabeth II )

Reverse
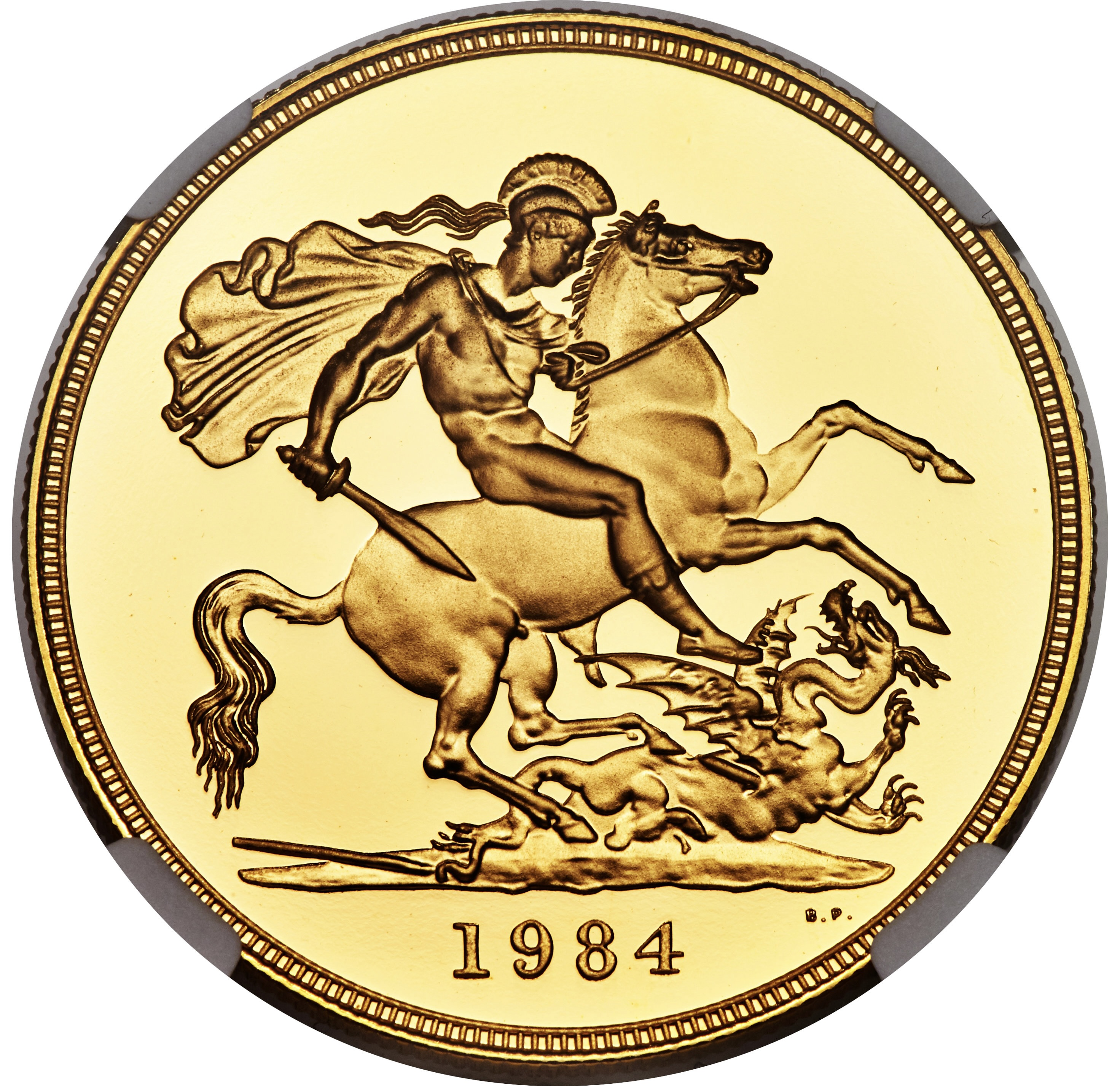
- Design: St George and the Dragon
- Designer: Benedetto Pistrucci
- Design date: 1817 (first appearance on five-pound coin in 1820).

The quintuple sovereign, or the five-pound gold coin, is a British sterling gold coin with a nominal value of five pounds (£5). (Note: This is only the face value as a denomination of sterling; the gold within the coin is worth significantly more.) It has been struck intermittently since 1820, though as a circulation coin only in 1887, 1893 and 1902. Through most of its history, it has depicted, on its reverse, Benedetto Pistrucci's portrayal of St George and the Dragon, which has traditionally been used on the sovereign, or one-pound gold coin.

The five-pound piece was one of the original denominations of gold coins authorised as part of the Great Recoinage of 1816. It was not struck until 1820, and then only as a pattern coin. It was issued again in small numbers in 1826, 1829 and 1839, with the last using the well-regarded depiction of Una and the Lion by William Wyon. Although the Una coin was for sale for almost half a century at the Royal Mint, only about 400 are believed to have been struck.

In 1887, it was struck for the first time for circulation, and it was struck also in 1893 and 1902, though few actually circulated; examples struck in 1911 were only available as part of a proof set. In 1887 and 1902 it was struck in very small numbers at the Sydney Mint, with examples bearing its mint mark S. The examples struck in preparation for the coinage of Edward VIII are highly prized; one sold in 2021 for £1,654,000, the highest price paid for a British coin.

Since 1980, the five-pound gold piece has been struck in most years by the Royal Mint for sale to collectors and holders of bullion. Although generally featuring Pistrucci's design, commemorative versions have been issued, such as in 2022, as a memorial following the death of Elizabeth II, featuring the bust of her son and successor, Charles III.

== Origins ==
The five guinea gold coin started out in 1668 as a coin worth one hundred shillings (five pounds), and was sometimes called a five-pound coin. This was before the fluctuating value of the guinea settled at twenty-one shillings in 1717. According to Richard Lobel, in his Coincraft's Standard Catalogue of English and UK Coins, there is some argument that the five-pound piece issued after the Great Recoinage of 1816 was merely a continuation of the earlier coin, which had last been struck in 1753. However, Lobel separates the two series in his catalogue.

After the Napoleonic Wars, Parliament, by the Coinage Act 1816, placed Britain officially on the gold standard, with the pound to be defined as a given quantity of gold. During parliamentary debate, almost every speaker supported having a coin valued at twenty shillings, rather than continuing to use the guinea. One reason for the introduction of gold coinage based on the sovereign was that its value, equal to one pound sterling, was more convenient than the guinea, equal to twenty-one shillings. Nevertheless, the Coinage Act did not specify which coins the Mint should strike.

A committee of the Privy Council recommended gold coins of ten shillings, twenty shillings, two pounds and five pounds be issued, and this was accepted by George, Prince Regent on 3 August 1816. The twenty-shilling piece was named a sovereign, with the resurrection of the old name possibly promoted by antiquarians with numismatic interests. The sovereign and half sovereign were both first issued in 1817, but there was initially no striking of the two larger coins. Since 1754, there had been no issuance of coins more valuable than a guinea intended for general circulation; the need for higher value tender had been met by bank notes. The St George and the dragon design was suggested as an appropriate motif for the sovereign by its creator, Benedetto Pistrucci, based on a cameo he had carved.

== Early issues ==
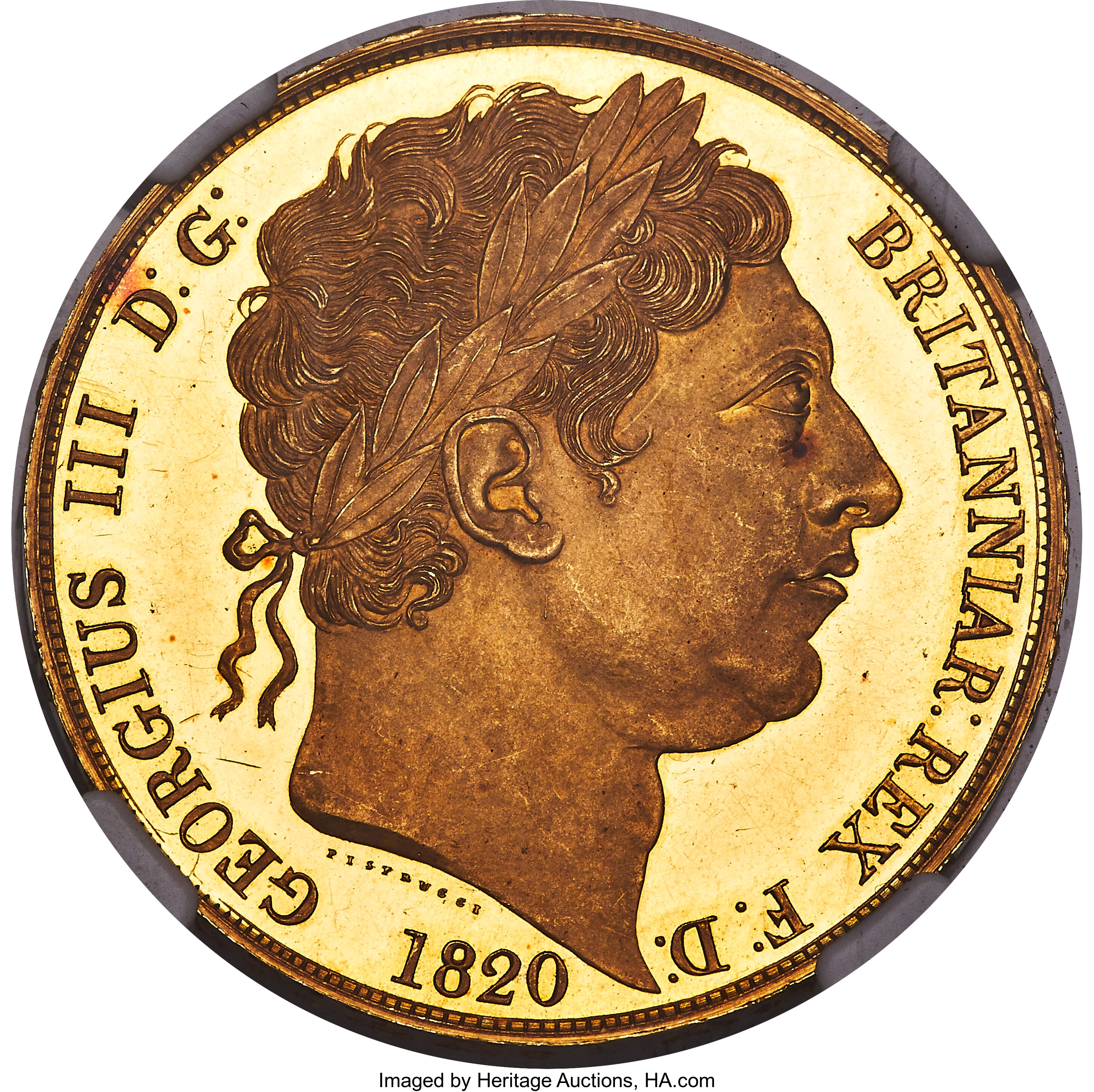
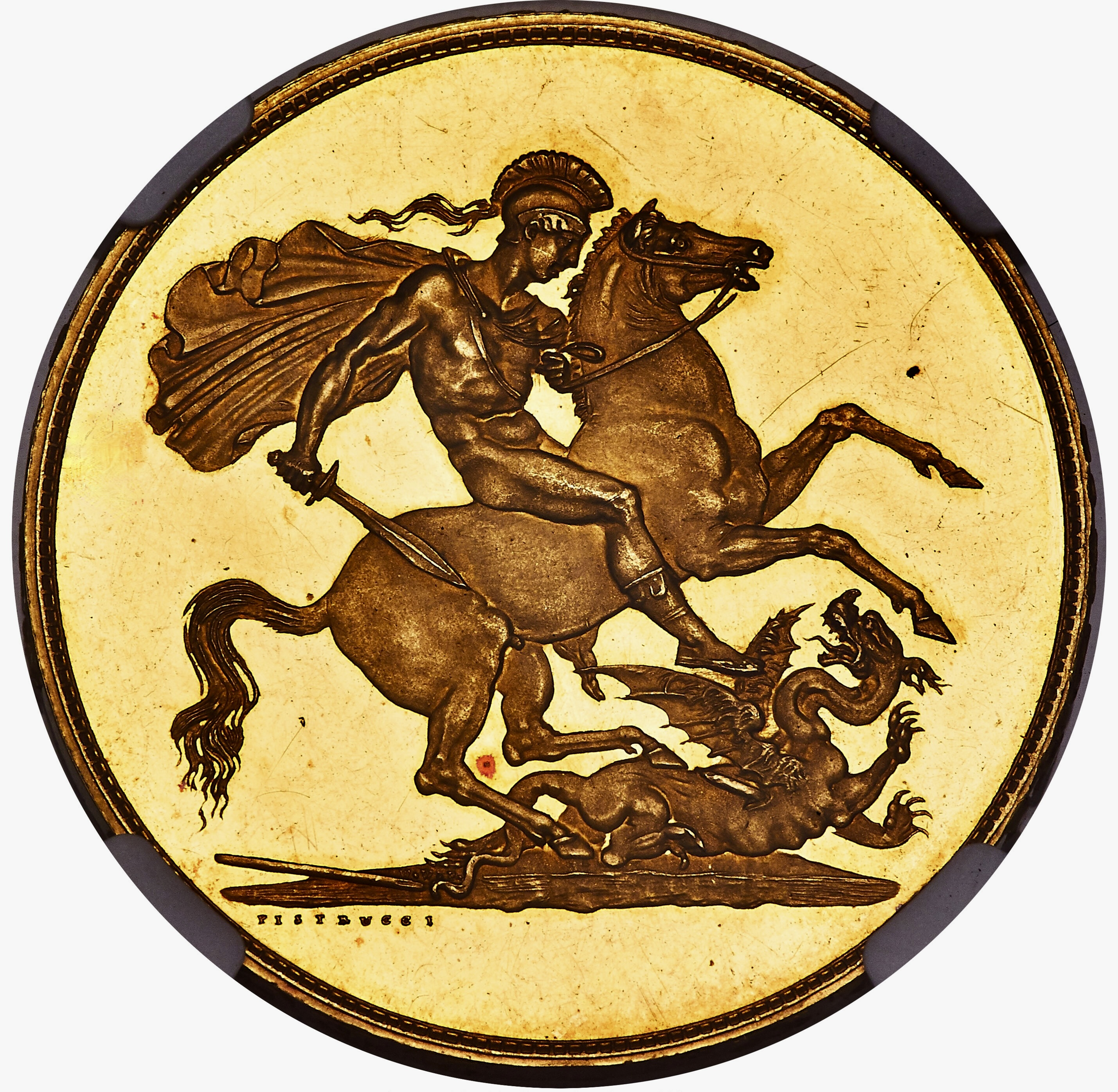
George III five-pound piece

The first striking of the five-pound denomination after the coinage reform was in 1820 as a pattern coin, depicting George III (r. 1760–1820). The obverse shows the right-facing bust of the king with the legend GEORGIUS III D G BRITANNIAR REX F D (transl. George III by the grace of God king of the Britains, defender of the faith) and the date, while the reverse shows Pistrucci's George and dragon design with no legend or date. This design had first appeared on the sovereign in 1817, surrounded by a Garter. The design has Pistrucci's surname at the lower left, with the initials of the master of the Mint, William Wellesley-Pole, near the broken spear.

Lobel, in describing the 1820 five-pound piece, noted that on a copy of G. F. Crowther's 1887 book, A Guide to English Pattern Coins presented to an unknown person with the publisher's compliments, there is a pencil notation that work on the 1820 piece was completed a few days before George III's death, and after Pistrucci, walking home on the day the king died, heard church bells announcing the demise. He then returned to the Royal Mint and instructed that some five-pound coins be struck the next morning. Lobel described this as a "fascinating episode of numismatic history". The numismatist Edward Hawkins, writing in 1850, also wrote dramatically, describing what he deemed heroic efforts to ensure that the pattern double sovereigns and five-pound coins were actually struck before the king died, but William John Hocking and others have since studied the matter, concluding the coinage dies were not completed until after the king's death on 29 January. The approximately 25 specimens were distributed among Royal Mint officials, prominent numismatists and other important people of the day, as well as given to the Royal Mint and British Museum. One sold in October 2021 for about £635,000.

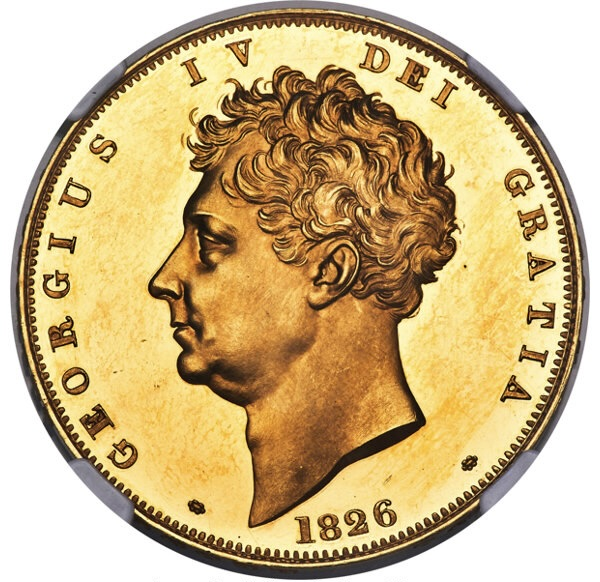
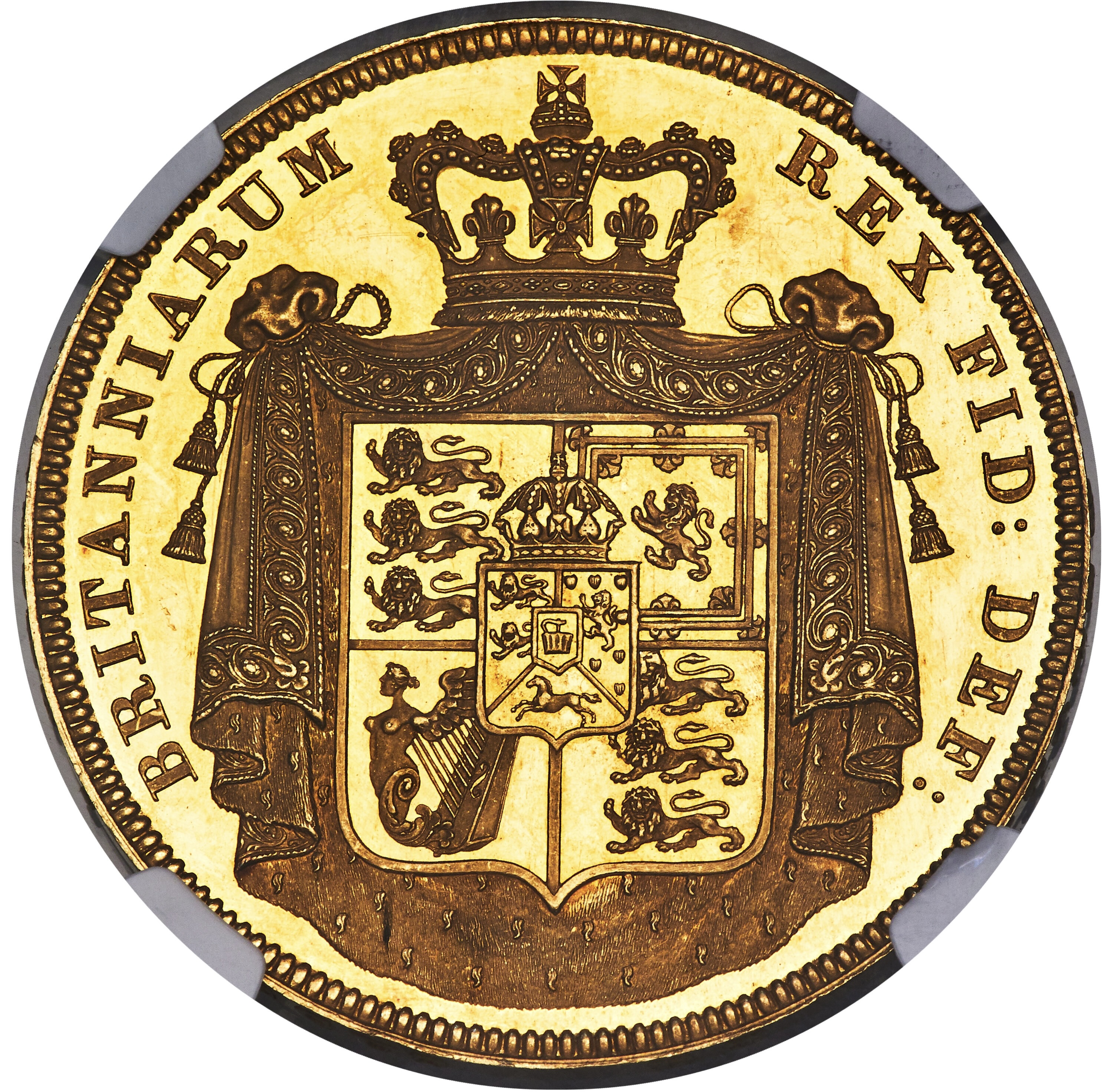
George IV five-pound piece

The next appearance of the denomination was in the reign of George IV (r. 1820–1830), in 1826, included in the proof set of that year. One piece is known dated 1829. The obverse shows the left-facing bust of the king with the legend GEORGIUS IV DEI GRATIA (transl. George IV by the grace of God) while the reverse shows a crowned shield within a mantle cape with the legend BRITANNIARUM REX FID DEF (transl. King of the Britains, defender of the faith). The 1826 coin has the edge inscription DECUS ET TUTAMEN ANNO REGNI SEPTIMO (transl. An ornament and a safeguard; seventh year of the reign), while the 1829 coin has a plain edge. No five-pound coins were issued during the reign of William IV (r. 1830–1837).

== Victoria five-pound coins ==
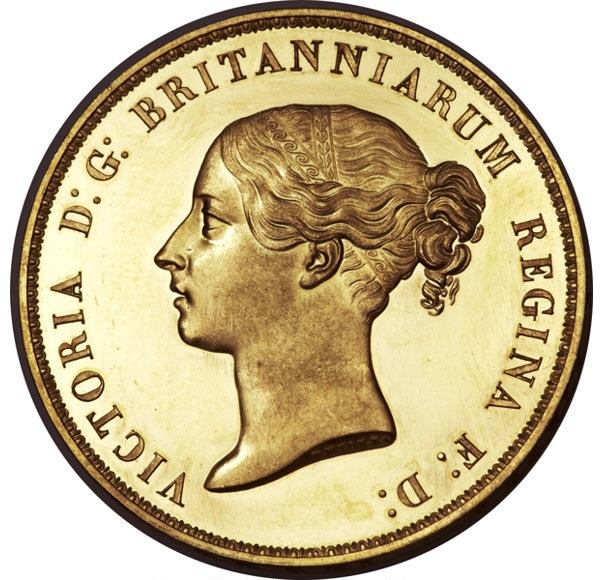
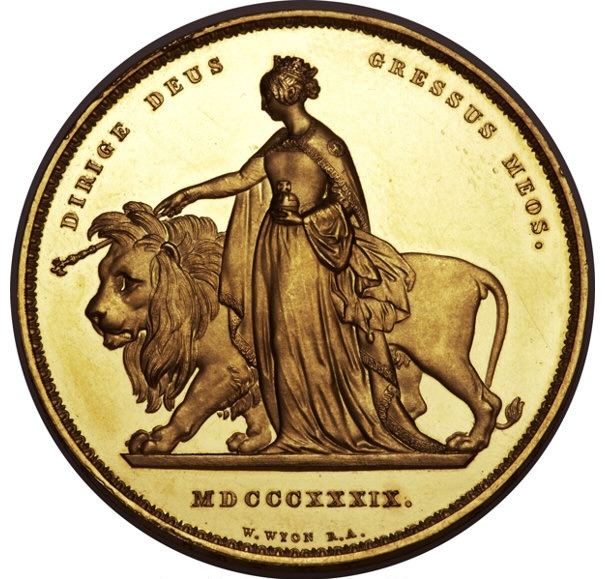
"Una and the Lion" piece

The next coin of this value did not appear until early in the reign of Queen Victoria (r. 1837–1901), when what Lobel deems one of the most famous and attractive of all British coins was produced. This piece, known as the Una and the Lion coin, is described by him as having "cult status". Una and the Lion appear in Edmund Spenser's 16th century epic The Faerie Queene. The obverse shows the young head of the queen, facing left with the legend VICTORIA D G BRITANNIARUM REGINA F D (transl. Victoria by the grace of God queen of the Britains, defender of the faith), while the reverse shows her as Una leading the lion to the left, with the legend DIRIGE DEUS GRESSUS MEOS (transl. O Lord, direct my steps), though some coins say DIRIGIT DEUS GRESSUS MEOS (transl. The Lord directs my steps) with the date MDCCCXXXIX (1839) in the exergue under the lion. The edge may either have the inscription DECUS ET TUTAMEN ANNO REGNI TERTIO (transl. an ornament and a safeguard; in the third year of the reign) or be plain. These coins were struck on demand and were sold by the Royal Mint until 1886; there are a number of varieties and a total mintage of perhaps 400. A specimen in exceptional condition sold in 2021 for US$1.44 million (£1.04 million).

Pistrucci's George and dragon depiction returned to the five-pound coin in 1887, as part of the Jubilee coinage, with an obverse by Joseph Boehm. The new coin bears the wording VICTORIA D G BRITT REG F D (transl. Victoria by the grace of God queen of the Britains, defender of the faith). The abbreviated form of Britanniarum is rendered as BRITT rather than with a single "T": Gladstone, a classical scholar as well as a politician, had pointed out that the abbreviation of a Latin plural noun should end with a doubled consonant.

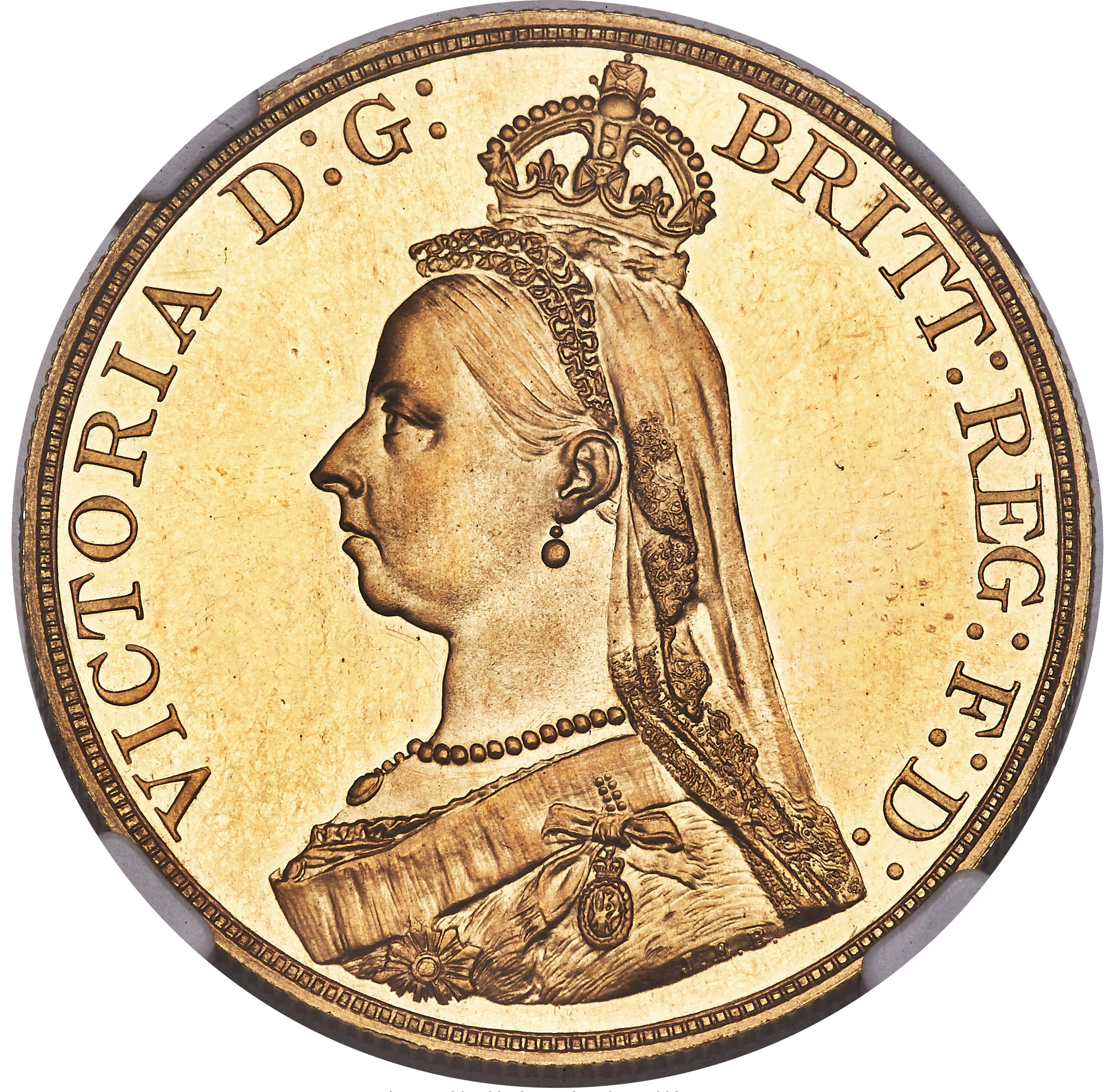
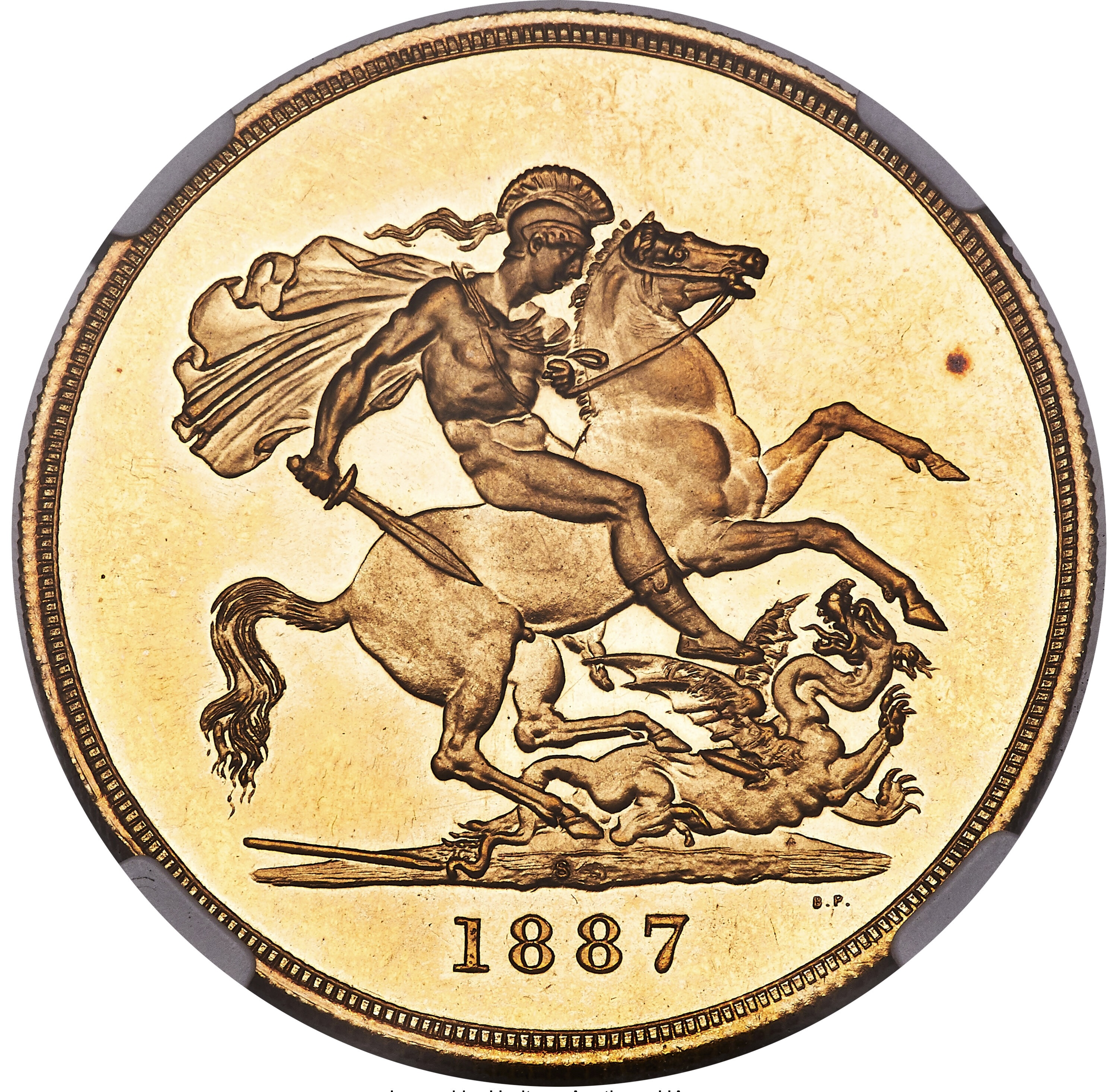
The rare 1887 five-pound piece from the Sydney Mint. Its mint mark "S" is seen on the base of the image of St George and the dragon above the exergue and midway between the two "8"s in the date.

The 1887 five-pound coin marked the first time that the denomination was available to the public at its face value; previous issues had been pattern or proof coins. In addition to those available for purchase at face value, proof coins were struck as part of the 1887 proof set. The five-pound and two-pound pieces did not circulate to any great extent, and were kept primarily as souvenirs. Nevertheless, the 1887 issue made the five-pound piece the highest-denomination circulating coin in Britain. A few of the 1887 five-pound coins were struck at the Sydney Mint and bear its mint mark "S" on the reverse. This is an extreme rarity, with only two being known in private hands – one sold in 2021 for US$660,000 (£480,000).

The Pistrucci reverse was used again in 1893, when the obverse used the "Old Head" or "Veiled Head" of the queen, with the legend VICTORIA DEI GRA BRITT REGINA FID DEF IND IMP (transl. Victoria, by the grace of God queen of the Britains, defender of the faith, empress of India), and the edge, like that of the Jubilee issue, is milled. Victoria had been lobbying since 1888 for her title as empress of India, granted by the Royal Titles Act 1876, to be included on the coinage, and on 12 February 1892, the Prime Minister, Lord Salisbury, wrote to her, "Your Majesty's Servants are of opinion that the title of Empress of India, indicating, as it does, Your Majesty's relation to far the larger portion of Your subjects, ought to appear on the coin, in the shape of the letters 'Ind Imp' or 'I.I.' or some such abbreviation." IND IMP, short for INDIAE IMPERATRIX (transl. empress of India), thus appears on the 1893 issue, which was available both at face value and as part of a proof set.

== Early 20th-century five-pound coins ==
Following the death of Queen Victoria in January 1901, preparations began for the coinage of her son and successor, Edward VII (r. 1901–1910), and a five-pound coin, with an obverse by George William de Saulles, was made current by proclamation dated 1 January 1902. The Royal Mint had decided to make as few changes as possible for King Edward's coinage, and the Pistrucci reverse continued for the gold coins. Five-pound coins were issued both at face value and in the proof sets issued to commemorate the coronation of Edward VII. The legend on the obverse reads EDWARDVS VII D G BRITT OMN REX F D IND IMP. (transl. Edward VII, by the grace of God king of all the Britains, defender of the faith, emperor of India). The word OMN (short for omnium, lit. 'of all'), was added after BRITT in recognition of the empire's assistance during the Boer War, these words last appeared on British coinage in 1953. During Edward's reign, five-pound coins were only struck in 1902. A small number of coins, with the mint mark "S", were struck in 1902 at Sydney, and are extremely rare.

Five-pound coins dated 1911 were struck as part of the coronation proof sets that year for George V (r. 1910–1936), but for uncertain reasons, no ordinary, non-proof specimens were coined. This was the only issuance of five-pound coins during that reign. These coins featured a bust of King George by Bertram Mackennal, Pistrucci's reverse and a legend that was unaltered except to substitute the name of the king, rendered as GEORGIVS V.

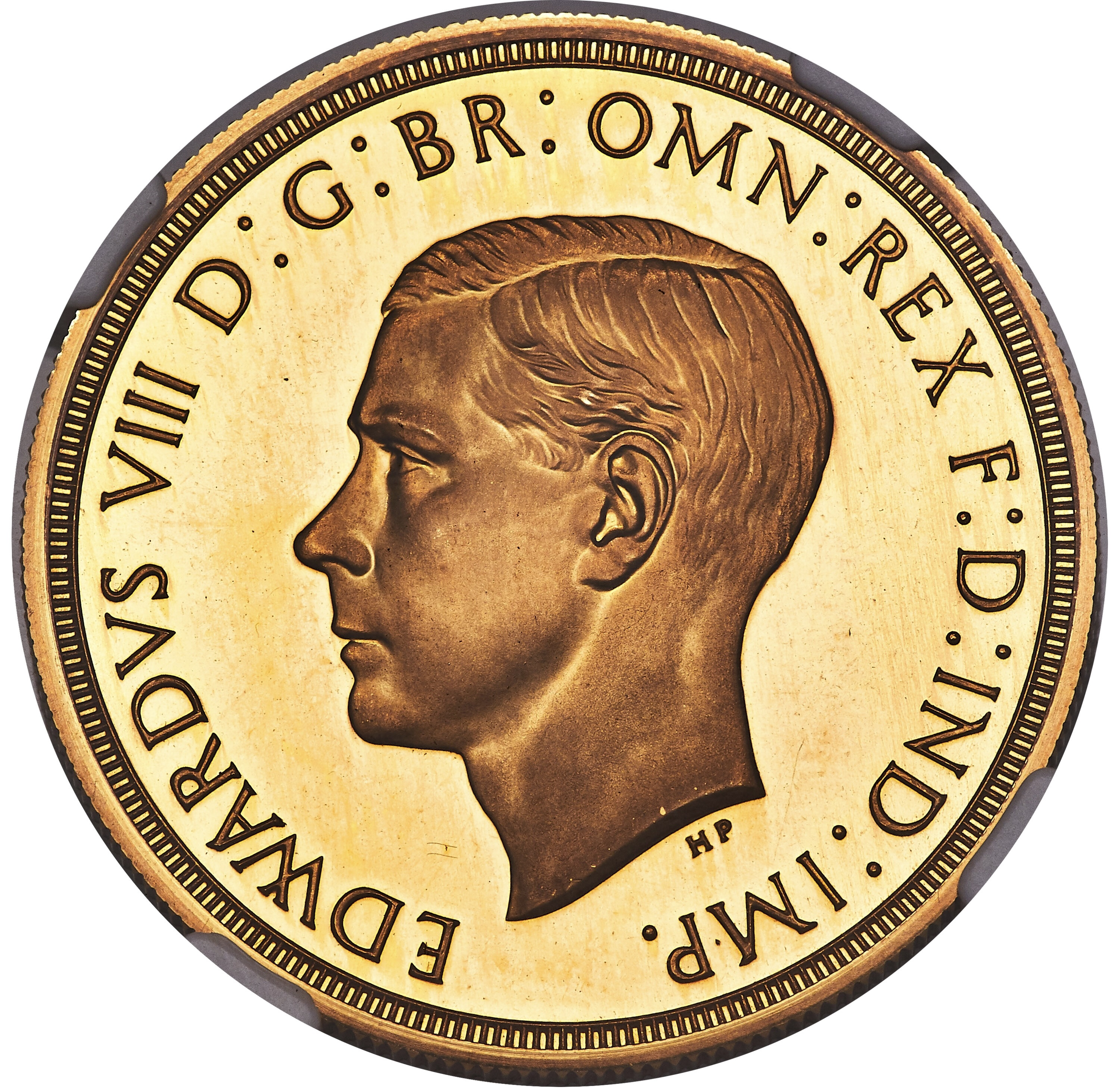
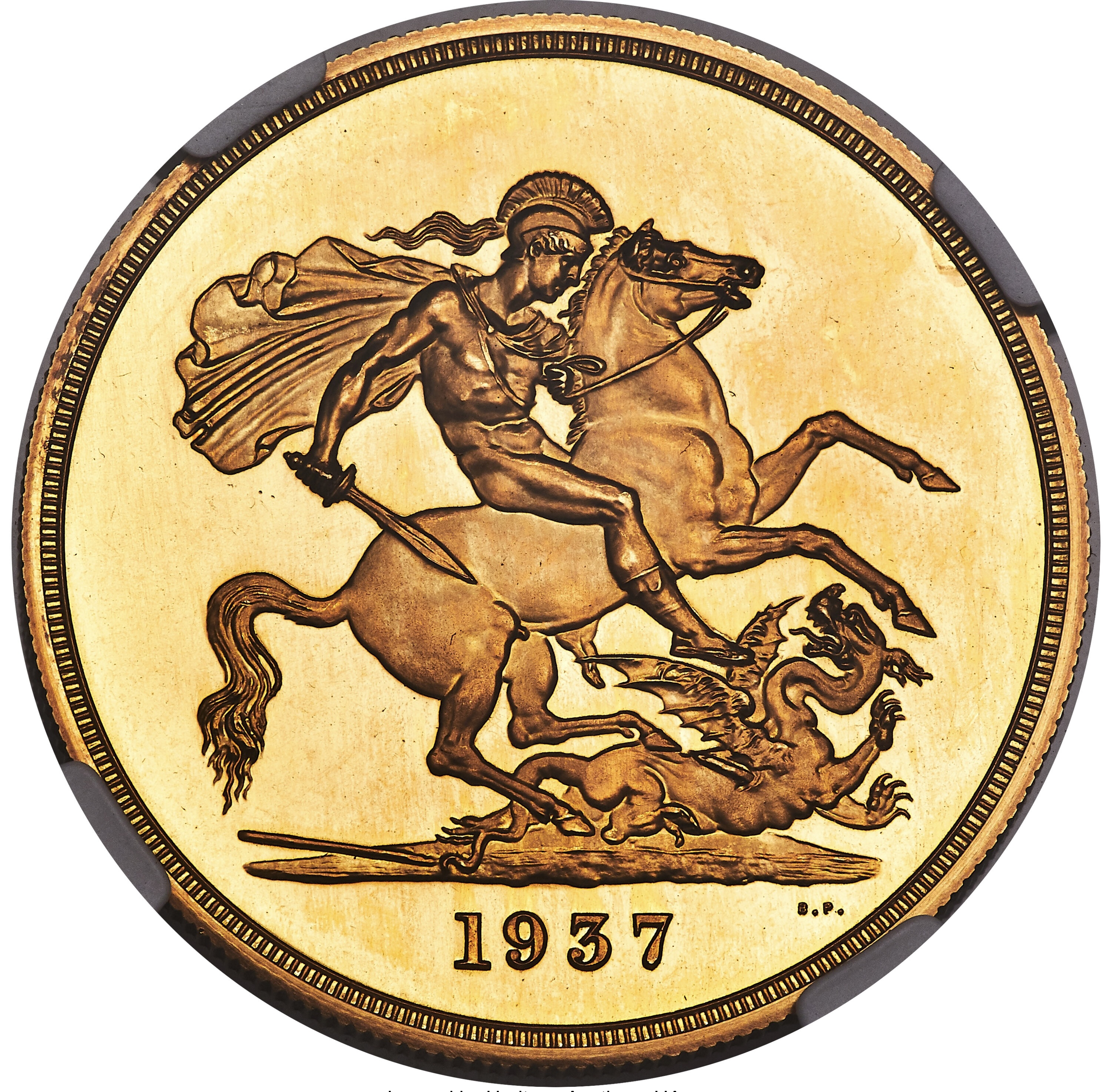
The most valuable British coin: the 1937 Edward VIII five-pound piece

Following the death of King George in 1936, preparations began for the coinage of his son and successor, Edward VIII (r. 1936–1936). The new king wanted his profile to face left on the new coinage, the same way as his father, which would break a tradition to reverse the direction on the commencement of a new reign which dated back to 1660. Following extensive correspondence between the king and the chancellor of the exchequer, Neville Chamberlain, Edward got his way, and pattern coins bearing a left-facing bust of the king by Thomas Humphrey Paget were struck. The Pistrucci reverse was used, but the king's abdication in December 1936 ended the preparations. Edward later requested a set of the pattern coins prepared for him, but was refused by his brother and successor, George VI (r. 1936–1952). Edward's five-pound coin is extremely rare, with only two known to be in private hands, of which one sold in 2021 for US$2,280,000 (£1,654,000), a record for a British coin. The legend on Edward's five-pound piece was identical to that of the previous reign but for the name and date; only a similar change was made for George VI, whose five-pound coin features a left-facing bust by Paget and the Pistrucci reverse. This was only struck in 1937, with a plain edge, as part of the coronation proof sets. None were issued for general circulation; but gold had vanished from circulation in Britain twenty years previously.

== Elizabeth II and Charles III ==
The reign of Queen Elizabeth II (r. 1952–2022) saw a departure from the normal practice in issuing gold coinage, in which the four denominations of gold coins (the half sovereign, sovereign, double sovereign and five-pound piece) were available to the public in the coronation year. A small number of gold £5 pieces were struck in 1953, the year of Elizabeth's coronation, in order to provide continuity of the series, and again in 1957, with an obverse depicting Elizabeth by Mary Gillick and the Pistrucci reverse, but neither of these strikings were released to the public. The 1953 strikings bore an obverse legend of ELIZABETH II DEI GRA BRITT OMN REGINA F D (transl. Elizabeth II by the grace of God queen of all the Britains, defender of the faith) but this was changed for 1957, removing BRITT OMN (transl. of all the Britains). This change was made to acknowledge the evolving British Commonwealth, which by then contained some republics. The resulting wording continued to be used on Elizabeth's coinage, with variations in the abbreviations.

No further £5 gold pieces were struck until 1980, nine years after decimalisation. The Royal Mint realised there was a market for sovereign coins, and began to sell them to collectors at well over face or bullion value. Beginning in 1980, five-pound gold coins were sold every year, except 1983, sometimes in a four-piece proof set with the half sovereign, sovereign and double sovereign, and sometimes sold individually. The pieces sold individually were in uncirculated, rather than proof, condition, and display an encircled "U" to the left of the date. Pieces up to 1984 used an obverse portrait of Elizabeth by Arnold Machin, and later ones up to 1997 by Raphael Maklouf, excepting the 1989 issue, which featured special designs by Bernard Sindall in honour of the 500th anniversary of the sovereign coin.

From 1998, a new obverse portrait of Elizabeth by Ian Rank-Broadley was used on the five-pound piece. This was used up to 2015. The Pistrucci design continued on the reverse, except in 2002, 2005 and 2012, when commemorative designs were used instead. The special designs for the reverse which were substituted for Pistrucci's were for Elizabeth II's Golden Jubilee in 2002 (by Timothy Noad, depicting a crowned shield within a wreath), in 2005 (a more modern interpretation of the George and dragon, also by Noad) and in 2012 for Elizabeth II's Diamond Jubilee (another modern interpretation of the George and dragon, by Paul Day). Beginning in 2009, the Pistrucci reverse for the five-pound coin was revised to closely resemble the denomination's original 1820 pattern coin, with the designer's last name in full to the left of the date, and a broader rim to the coin.

Beginning with some 2015 issues, an obverse portrait of Elizabeth by Jody Clark was used, though in 2016, some coins bore a different portrait of the queen by James Butler. In 2017, a version with the original, 1817 sovereign design was struck. This was for the 200th anniversary of the modern sovereign.

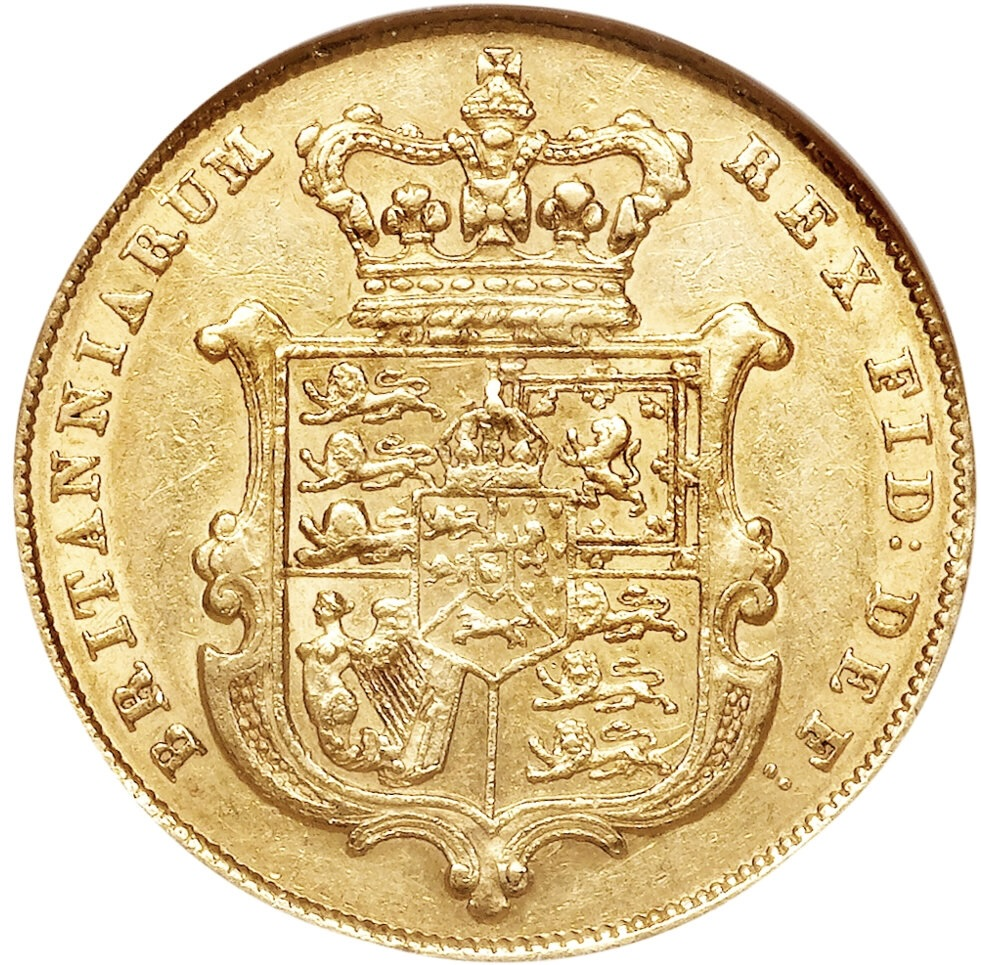
Jean Baptiste Merlen's 1825 reverse for the sovereign was reused 200 years later.

In 2022, the Royal Mint struck five-pound coins with a reverse design by Noad showing an interpretation of the Royal Arms. This design, used for the sovereign and its multiples and fractions, was to mark the Platinum Jubilee of Elizabeth II. Later in the year, following the death of Elizabeth II, the Royal Mint issued memorial coins in the sovereign range, including the five-pound coin, featuring an interpretation of the Royal Arms by Clark as the reverse, and for the obverse, the first coinage portrait of Elizabeth's successor, Charles III (r. 2022– ), by Martin Jennings. In addition to a left-facing bust of Charles, the obverse carried the wording CHARLES III DEI GRA REX FID DEF (transl. Charles III by the grace of God king, defender of the faith). In 2023, a five-pound piece commemorating the coronation of Charles III was struck, with the obverse a crowned portrait of the king by Jennings and the reverse the Pistrucci George and dragon. For 2024, Jennings' uncrowned portrait of Charles was paired with Pistrucci's reverse on each of the five sovereign denominations struck in proof, from the quarter sovereign to the five-pound piece. For 2025, the five-sovereign piece featured Jean Baptiste Merlen's Royal Arms reverse, first used on the sovereign in 1825, for its 200th anniversary. For 2026, the sovereign range returned to yellow-coloured gold from rose and added security features amid strong demand and price rises for gold.

== See also ==
- Sovereign (British coin)
- Double sovereign

== Bibliography ==
- Bair, Bob (March 2023). "William Wyon's Una and the Lion". The Numismatist: 46–50.
- Bull, Maurice (2023). English Gold Coinage. Vol. II. London, England: Spink & Son Ltd. ISBN 978-1-912667-72-7.
- Celtel, André; Gullbekk, Svein H. (2006). The Sovereign and its Golden Antecedents. Oslo, Norway: Monetarius. ISBN 978-82-996755-6-7.
- Clancy, Kevin (2017) [2015]. A History of the Sovereign: Chief Coin of the World (second ed.). Llantrisant, Wales: Royal Mint Museum. ISBN 978-1-869917-00-5.
- Lant, Jeffrey L. (1973). "The Jubilee Coinage of 1887" (PDF). British Numismatic Journal. 43: 132–141.
- Mussell, John W., ed. (2016). The Coin Yearbook 2017. Exeter, Devon: Token Publishing Ltd. ISBN 978-1-908828-30-9.
- Lobel, Richard, ed. (1999) [1995]. Coincraft's Standard Catalogue English & UK Coins 1066 to Date (5th ed.). London: Standard Catalogue Publishers Ltd. ISBN 978-0-9526228-8-8.
- Marsh, Michael A. (2017) [1980]. The Gold Sovereign (revised ed.). Exeter, Devon: Token Publishing Ltd. ISBN 978-1-908828-36-1.
- Seaby, Peter (1985). The Story of British Coinage. London: B. A. Seaby Ltd. ISBN 978-0-900652-74-5.
- Skellern, Stephen (October 2013). "The Coinage of Edward VII, Part I". Coin News: 31–33.
- Spink & Son Ltd (2004). Coins of England and the United Kingdom (39th ed.). London: Spink & Son Ltd. ISBN 978-1-902040-56-1.
- Spink & Son Ltd (2017). Coins of England and the United Kingdom, Decimal Issues (3rd ed.). London: Spink & Son Ltd. ISBN 978-1-907427-99-2.
- Stocker, Mark (1996). "The Coinage of 1893" (PDF). British Numismatic Journal. 66: 67–86.
