= Royal Mint Museum =

Numismatics museum located in Llantrisant, Wales, United Kingdom

The Royal Mint Museum
- Established: 2009
- Location: Llantrisant, Wales
- Coordinates: 51.5541°N 3.3876°W
- Director: Dr Kevin Clancy
- Chairperson: Dr Andrew Burnett CBE
- Website: Museum Website

The Royal Mint Museum is a numismatics museum located in Llantrisant, Wales, which houses coins, medals, artwork and minting equipment previous owned by the Royal Mint. Although the museum is located on the same site as the Royal Mint, the mint and the museum are separate companies. In partnership with the mint, a new £9 million visitor centre was built to allow members of the public to view part of the museum's collection.

== History ==
Following the privatisation of the Royal Mint in 2009, whereby it became a limited company, much of the mint's numismatic collection was separated into a separate entity now called the Royal Mint Museum. In November 2010 the museum gained charitable status.

== Collection ==
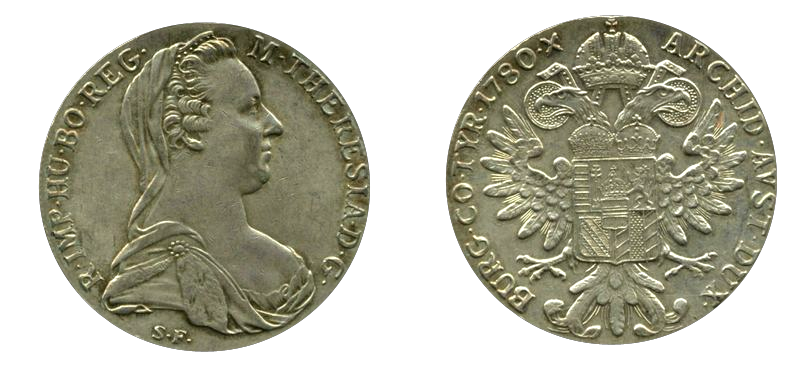
Maria Theresa thaler medal

- Battle of Waterloo Medal Roll
- Unreleased Edward VIII pattern coins
- A pre-decimal 1933 penny
- Maria Theresa thaler
- Elizabeth I gold sovereign
