= Kevin Clancy (Royal Mint) =

British numismatist; Director of the Royal Mint Museum

Kevin Clancy is a numismatist and the Director of the Royal Mint Museum. Clancy is also Secretary to the Royal Mint Advisory Committee on the Design of Coins, Medals, Seals and Decorations which advises the British Government and Crown on the designs of coins and similar objects.

== Biography ==
Kevin Clancy graduated from the University of Leeds (First Class Honors) with a degree in history and completed a PhD on The Recoinage and Exchange of 1816-17.

Kevin Clancy became a member of the British Numismatic Society in 1993.

== Recognition ==
- 2002: Council Prize of the British Numismatic Society

== Publications ==
=== Author ===
- The recoinage and exchange of 1816-17. PhD Thesis, University of Leeds, 1999.
- A history of the sovereign: chief coin of the world. (2015). ISBN 978-1-869917005
- An illustrated history of the Royal Mint. (2016). ISBN 978-1-869917012
- Objects of war: currency in a time of conflict. (2018) ISBN 978-1-907427909

=== Editor ===
- Designing change: The art of coin design. Llantrisant: Royal Mint, 2008. ISBN 978-1-869917067
- Britannia: icon on the coin. (2016) ISBN 978-1-869917029
- When Britain went Decimal: the coinage of 1971. (2021) ISBN 978-1-912667567
