= List of British banknotes and coins =

List of British banknotes and coins, with commonly used terms.

== Coins ==
=== Pre-decimal ===
Prior to decimalisation in 1971, there were 12 pence (written as 12d) in a shilling (written as 1s or 1/-) and 20 shillings in a pound, written as £1 (occasionally "L" was used instead of the pound sign, £). There were therefore 240 pence in a pound. For example, 2 pounds 14 shillings and 5 pence could have been written as £2 14s 5d or £2/14/5. The origin of £/$\mathfrak{L}$, s, and d were the Latin terms Libra, meaning a pound weight (with the £ sign developing as an elaborate L), solidus (pl. solidi), 20 of which made up one Libra, and denarius (pl. denarii), 240 of which made up one Libra with 12 being equal to one solidus. These terms and divisions of currency were in use from the 7th century.

The value of some coins fluctuated, particularly in the reigns of James I and Charles I. The value of a guinea fluctuated between 20 and 30 shillings before being fixed at 21 shillings in December 1717. These are denominations of British, or earlier English, coins – Scottish coins had different values.

Coin	Pre-decimalisation value	Post-decimalisation value (Note: Face value fixed in 1970; real/retail value likely to be considerably higher)	Dates of use	Notes
Quarter farthing	1/16d	£0.00026	1839–1868.	(Note: Denomination issued for use in the colonies, usually in Ceylon, Malta, and the West Indies.)
Third farthing	1/12d	£0.0003472	1827–1913.	(Note: Denomination issued for use in the colonies, usually in Ceylon, Malta, and the West Indies.)
Half farthing	1/8d	£0.00052083	1828–1868.	(Note: Denomination issued for use in the colonies, usually in Ceylon, Malta, and the West Indies.)
Farthing	1/4d	£0.00104167	c. 757–1960.	The word "farthing" means "fourth part" (of a penny). Originally cut from a penny into four small quarters until 1272.
Halfpenny	1/2d	£0.0021	757–1969.	Often called a "ha'penny" (pronounced /ˈheɪpni/ HAYP-nee), plural halfpennies ("ha'pennies") for the coins, halfpence ("ha'pence") for the monetary amount. Originally cut from a penny into two halves until 1272.
Three farthings	3/4d	£0.0031	1561–1582.	
One penny	1d	£0.0042	757–1970 (and thereafter only for Maundy).	Commonly called a "copper"; plural "pennies" for the coins, "pence" for the monetary amount
Three halfpence	11/2d	£0.0063	1561–1582, 1834–1870.	Pronounced as "three-ha'pence".
Half groat	2d	£0.0083	1351–1662.	The precursor to twopence just with a different name.
Twopence	2d	£0.0083	silver 1668–current (for Maundy); copper 1797–1798.	Pronounced "tuppence".
Twopence-farthing	2 1/4d	0.009375	1560	Countermarked Edward VI 3rd period shillings which were terribly debased. Denoted by a countermark of a seated greyhound on the obverse.
Threepence	3d	£0.0125	silver 1551–1945 (and thereafter only for Maundy), nickel-brass 1937–1970.	Sometimes called "thripp'nce", "thrupp'nce", "threpp'nce" or "thripp'ny bit", "thrupp'ny bit". Referred to as a "joey" after the groat was no longer in circulation, as featured in George Orwell's Keep the Aspidistra Flying.
Groat	4d	£0.0167	silver 1279–1662, 1836–1862 (and thereafter only for Maundy).	Referred to as a "joey" after Joseph Hume, the economist and Member of Parliament until it stopped being issued in 1885.
Fourpence-halfpenny	4 1/2d	£0.01875	silver 1560	Countermarked Edward VI 2nd period shillings under Elizabeth I. Denoted by the portcullis coutermark on the obverse .
Sixpence	6d	£0.025	1551–1970; circulated from 1971 to 1980 with a value of two and a half decimal pence.	Also called "tanner", sometimes "tilbury", or "joey" after the groat was no longer in circulation.
Sevenpence	7d	£0.0292	Late 1640s	Minted under Charles I during the civil war briefly.
Eightpence	8d	£0.0334	Late 1640s	Minted under Charles I during the civil war briefly.
Ninepence	9d	£0.0375	1645-46	Minted under Charles I during the civil war briefly.
Tenpence	10d	£0.04	Late 1640s	Minted under Charles I during the civil war briefly.
Elevenpence	11d	£0.0442	Late 1640s	Minted under Charles I during the civil war briefly.
Shilling	1/-	£0.05	1502–1970, circulated from 1971 to 1990 with a value of five decimal pence.	Also called a "bob", in singular or plural. Originally called a 'Testoon' under Henry VIII.
One shilling and one penny	1/1	£0.0542	Late 1640s	Minted under Charles I during the civil war briefly.
One shilling and twopence	1/2	£0.0584	Late 1640s	Minted under Charles I during the civil war briefly.
One shilling and threepence	1/3	£0.0626	Late 1640s	Minted under Charles I during the civil war briefly.
One shilling and fourpence	1/4	£0.668	Late 1640s	Minted under Charles I during the civil war briefly.
Quarter florin or helm	1/6	£0.075	1344	Gold coin demonetized within one year. (Note: The medieval florin, half florin, and quarter florin were gold coins intended to circulate in Europe as well as in England and were valued at much more than the Victorian and later florin and double florin. The medieval florins were withdrawn within a year because they contained insufficient gold for their face value and thus were unacceptable to merchants.)
One shilling and sixpence	1/6	£0.075	Late 1640s	Minted under Charles I during the civil war briefly.
Gold penny	1/8 to 2/-	£0.0833 to £0.1	1257–1265.	Gold. Undervalued for its metal content and extremely rare.
Quarter noble	1/8	£0.0833	1344–1470.	
One shilling and ninepence	1/9	£0.0875	Late 1640s	Minted under Charles I during the civil war at Scarborough.
Quarter angel	2/-	£0.1	1547–1600.	Gold.
Florin or two shillings	2/-	£0.1	1848–1970, circulated from 1971 to 1993 with a value of ten decimal pence.	Not to be confused with the gold medieval florin.
Two shillings and twopence	2/2	£0.1084	Late 1640s	Minted by Charles I during the civil war briefly.
Two shillings and fourpence	2/4	£0.1168	1644-45	Minted under Charles I during the civil war at Scarborough.
Half crown	2/6	£0.125	1526–1969.	Sometimes known as "half a dollar" (see Crown below). (Made in gold until 1610 and made in silver from 1551)
Two shillings and sevenpence	2/7	£0.1292	1644-1645	Minted under Charles I during the civil war at Scarborough.
Two shillings and tenpence	2/10	£0.142	1644-1645	Minted under Charles I during the civil war at Scarborough.
Half florin or leopard	3/-	£0.15	1344	Gold; extremely rare.
Three shillings	3/-	£0.15	1644-1645	Minted under Charles I during the civil war at Carlisle
Half noble	3/4 to 4/2	£0.1667 to £0.2083	minted 1346–1438.	increased in value in 1464
Half angel	3/4, later 5/6	£0.1667, later £0.275	1470–1619.	
Double florin	4/-	£0.2	1887–1890.	Silver.
Crown of the rose	4/6	£0.225	1526–1551.	
Dollar (British coin)	5/-	£0.25	1804–1811, (withdrawn 1818)	Silver, overstruck on Spanish 8 Reales coin.
Crown	5/-	£0.25	1551–1965.	Sometimes known as "a dollar" – from the 1940s when the exchange rate was four USD to the GBP. Originally in gold until 1662 and in silver from 1551.
Quarter guinea	5/3	£0.2625	1718, 1762.	
Five shillings and eightpence	5/8	£0.284	1644-1645	Minted under Charles I during the civil war at Scarborough.
Florin or double leopard	6/-	£0.3	1344.	Gold; demonetized within one year.
Noble	6/8, later 8/4	£0.3333, later £0.4167	1344–1464.	Increased in value in 1464.
Angel	6/8	£0.3333	1461–1643.	
Half mark	6/8	£0.3333	[medieval period]	A unit of account, not a coin. Convenient as it was exactly one-third of a pound.
Third guinea	7/-	£0.35	1797–1813.	
Rose noble or ryal	10/-, later 15/-	£0.5, later £0.75	1464–1470, 1487, 1553–1603.	Increased in value from 1553.
Half sovereign	10/-	£0.5	1544–1553; 1603–1604; 1817–1937	A bullion coin since 1980.
Half pound	10/-	£0.5	1561-1570; 1642–1644	
Double crown	10/-	£0.5	1604–1619; 1625–1662.	
Half laurel	10/-	£0.5	1619–1625.	
Half unite	10/-	£0.5	1642–1643.	
Half guinea	10/6	£0.525	1669–1813.	
Mark	13/4	£0.667	[medieval period]	A unit of account not a coin, but widely used.
Spur ryal	15/-	£0.75	1604–1625.	
Sovereign	20/-	£1	1489–1604; 1817–1937	A bullion coin since 1957.
Unite	20/-	£1	1604–1619; 1649–1662.	
Laurel	20/-	£1	1619–1644?	
Carolus	20/-, later 23/-	£1, later £1.15	reign of Charles I.	
Broad	20/-	£1	1656.	
Guinea	21/-	£1.05	1663–1799, 1813.	
Rose Ryal	30/-	£1.50	1604–1625.	
Two pounds	40/-	£2	1823–1937.	Gold; "double sovereign".
Two guineas or double guinea	originally 40/-, later 42/-	originally £2, later £2.10	1664–1753.	Originally known as a "forty-shilling piece"; value changed to forty-two shillings after the Proclamation of 1717 finally settled the value of a guinea.
Fifty shillings	50/-	£2.50	1656.	
Triple unite	60/-	£3	1642–1644.	
Five pounds	100/-	£5	1826–1990.	Gold.
Five guineas	originally 100/-, later 105/-	originally £5, later £5.25	1668–1753.	Originally known and valued as five pounds, but became five guineas when the guinea was standardised at one pound and one shilling in 1717.

Visualisation of some British currency terms before decimalisation

Notes:

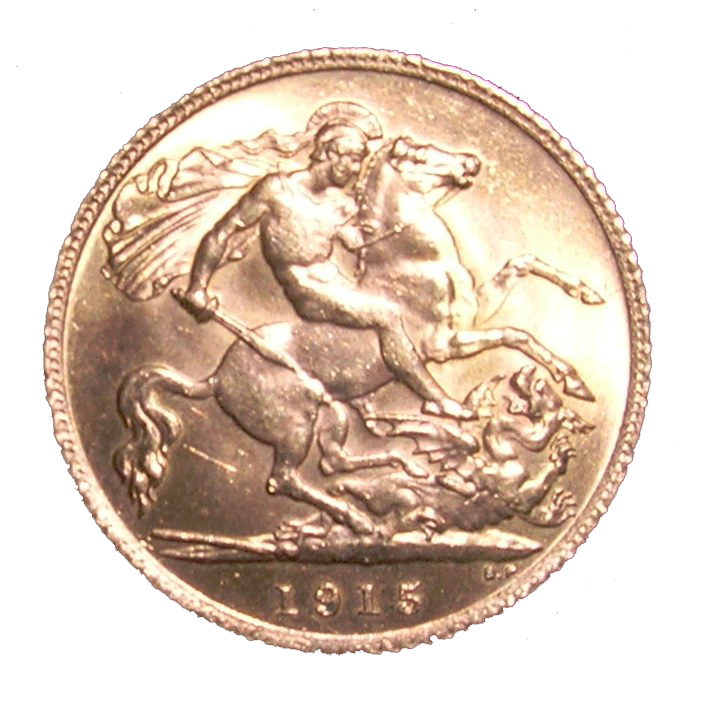
1915 half sovereign

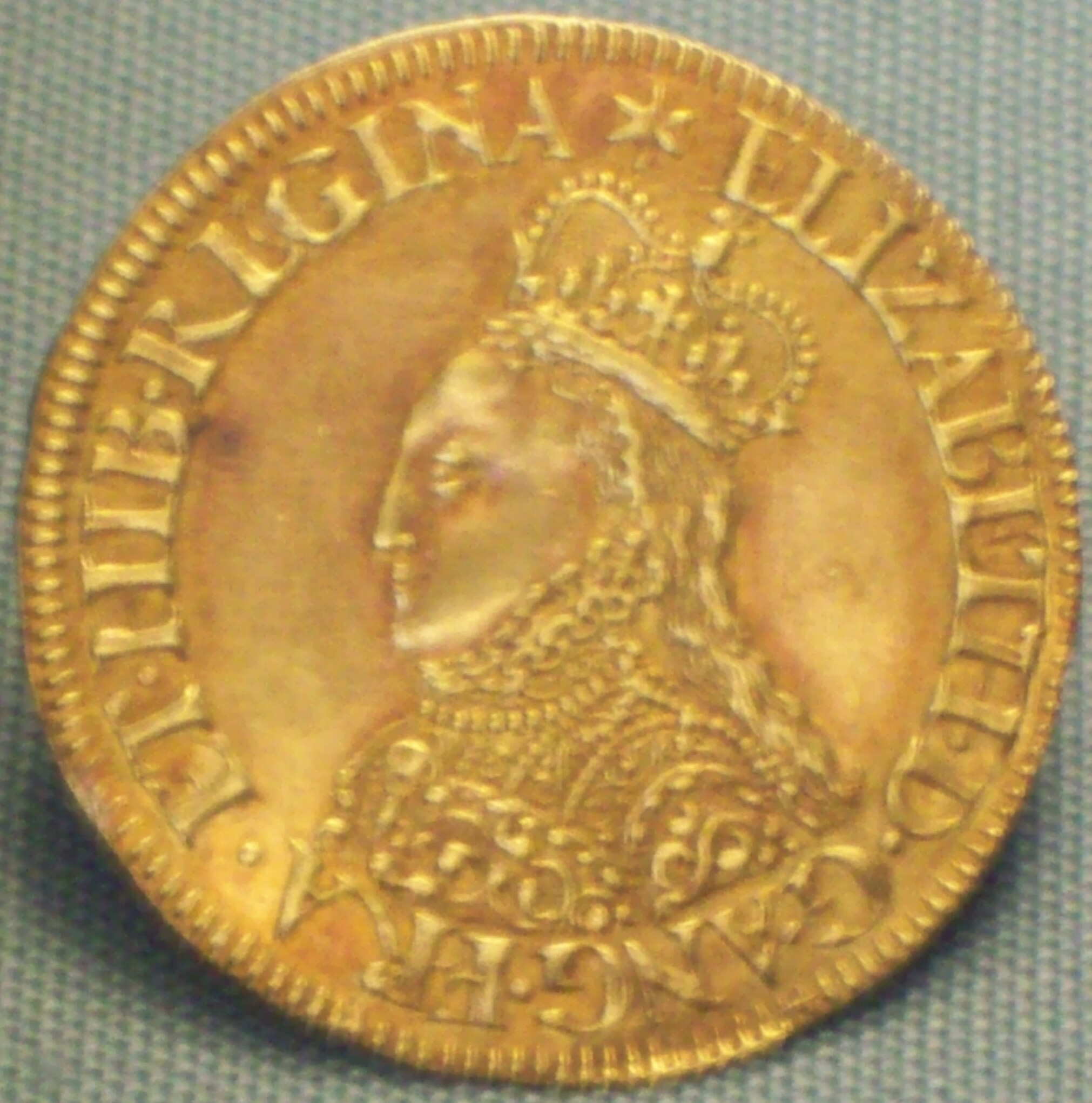
1560–61 halfpound, one of the first English milled coins

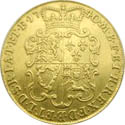
1740 Two guineas

=== Decimal ===
Since decimalisation on "Decimal Day", 15 February 1971, the pound has been divided into 100 pence. Originally the term "new pence" was used; the word "new" was dropped from the coinage in 1983. The old shilling equated to five (new) pence, and, for example, £2 10s 6d became £2.52 1/2. The symbol for the (old) penny, "d", was replaced by "p" (or initially sometimes "np", for new pence). Thus 72 pence can be written as £0.72 or 72p; both were commonly read as "seventy-two pee".

Post-decimalisation British coins.
Name	Value	Notes
Half penny	1/2p	Sometimes written "ha'penny" (pronounced /ˈheɪpni/ HAYP-nee), but normally called a "half-pee"; demonetised and withdrawn from circulation in December 1984.
One penny	1p	
Two pence	2p	
Five pence	5p	A direct replacement for the shilling. The coin was reduced in size in 1990.
Six pence	6p	Minted uniquely in 2016 as a commemorative coin.
Ten pence	10p	A replacement for the florin (two shillings). The coin was reduced in size in 1992.
Twenty pence	20p	Introduced in 1982.
Twenty-five pence	25p	A commemorative coin issued between 1972 and 1981 as a post-decimal continuation of the old crown. From 1990 it was replaced in the commemorative role by the £5 coin.
Fifty pence	50p	Introduced in 1969, just prior to decimalisation, to replace the ten shilling note ("ten bob note"). It was initially sometimes called a "ten bob bit". The coin was reduced in size in 1997.
One pound	£1	Introduced in 1983 to replace the one pound note.
Sovereign	£1	Gold bullion coins, available in four other sizes too: quarter sovereign (25p), half sovereign (£1/2), double sovereign (£2) and quintuple sovereign (£5).
Two pounds	£2	Issued as a commemorative coin from 1986 and in general circulation from 1998 (dated from 1997).
Britannia	various values	Gold and silver bullion coins, either one — or multiples, or fractions of — troy ounces.
Five pounds	£5	Introduced in 1990 as a commemorative coin, as a continuation of the old crown, replacing the commemorative role of the twenty-five pence coin.
The Valiant	various values	Bullion / collectors' coins issued in 2018 to 2021; 1 troy ounce of silver, with a value of £2, or 10 troy ounces, valued at £10.
Twenty pounds	£20	Introduced in 2013 as a commemorative coin.
Fifty pounds	£50	Introduced in 2015 as a commemorative coin.
One hundred pounds	£100	Introduced in 2015 as a commemorative coin.

== Banknotes ==
Main articles: Banknotes of the pound sterling and Bank of England note issues.

Note: The description of banknotes given here relates to notes issued by the Bank of England. Three banks in Scotland and three banks in Northern Ireland also issue notes, in some or all of the denominations: £1, £5, £10, £20, £50, £100.

Pre-decimalisation British Notes:
Name	Value	Circulation	Notes
Five shilling note	5/- (£0.25)	✗ withdrawn	Originally issued by the treasury in 1914-1928. Not replaced by Bank of England notes.
Ten shilling note	10/- (£0.50)	✗ withdrawn	Originally issued by the treasury in 1914. Replaced by Bank of England notes from 1928. Commonly known as "ten bob note" or "half a quid". 1914–1970.
£2 note	£2	✗ withdrawn	Originally issued by the treasury in 1797-1821. Not replaced by Bank of England notes.
£15 note	£15	✗ withdrawn	Issued from 1759
£25 note	£25	✗ withdrawn	Issued from 1765
£30 note	£30	✗ withdrawn	Issued from 1725
£40 note	£40	✗ withdrawn	Issued from 1725
£60 note	£60	✗ withdrawn	Issued from 1725
£70 note	£70	✗ withdrawn	Issued from 1725
£80 note	£80	✗ withdrawn	Issued from 1725
£90 note	£90	✗ withdrawn	Issued from 1725
£200 note	£200	✗ withdrawn	Issued from 1725
£300 note	£300	✗ withdrawn	Issued from 1725
£500 note	£500	✗ withdrawn	Issued from 1725
£1000 note	£1000	✗ withdrawn	Issued from 1725

Post-decimalisation British Notes:
Name	Value	Circulation	Notes
£1 note	£1	✗ withdrawn ✓ in circulation	Withdrawn in England and Wales in 1988. It is still issued by the Royal Bank of Scotland, and still used in some of the Channel Islands. Commonly known as a "quid".
£5 note	£5	✓ in circulation	The original "large white fiver" five pound note was known as "five jacks" and replaced in 1957 by the blue £5 note. Now also known as a "fiver".
£10 note	£10	✓ in circulation	Also known as a "tenner".
£20 note	£20	✓ in circulation	Also known as a "score".
£50 note	£50	✓ in circulation	Also known as a "bullseye".
£100 note	£100	✓ in circulation	Issued by Scottish and Northern-Irish banks only.
£1,000,000 note	£1,000,000	✗ non-circulating	Also known as a "Giant". Used as backing for banknotes issued by Scottish and Northern Irish banks when exceeding the value of their 1845 reserves. The amount to be covered is over a billion pounds. Also issued in 1948 as a temporary measure during the postwar reconstruction in the Marshall Plan.
£10,000,000 note	£10,000,000	✗ non-circulating	Used as backing for banknotes issued by Scottish and Northern Irish banks when exceeding the value of their 1845 reserves. The amount to be covered is over a billion pounds.
£100,000,000 note	£100,000,000	✗ non-circulating	Also known as a "Titan". Used as backing for banknotes issued by Scottish and Northern Irish banks when exceeding the value of their 1845 reserves. The amount to be covered is over a billion pounds.

Bank of England notes are periodically redesigned and reissued, with the old notes being withdrawn from circulation and destroyed. Each redesign is allocated a "series". Currently the £50 note is "series F" issue whilst the £5, £10 and £20 notes are "series G" issue. Series G is the latest round of redesign, which commenced in September 2016 with the polymer £5 note, September 2017 with the polymer £10 note, and February 2020 with the polymer £20 note.
