= Quarter guinea =

- United Kingdom
- Value: £0.2125; 5s 3d
- Mass: 2.10 g
- Diameter: 16.00 mm
- Edge: Milled
- Composition: 22 Carat Gold
- Years of minting: 1762

Obverse
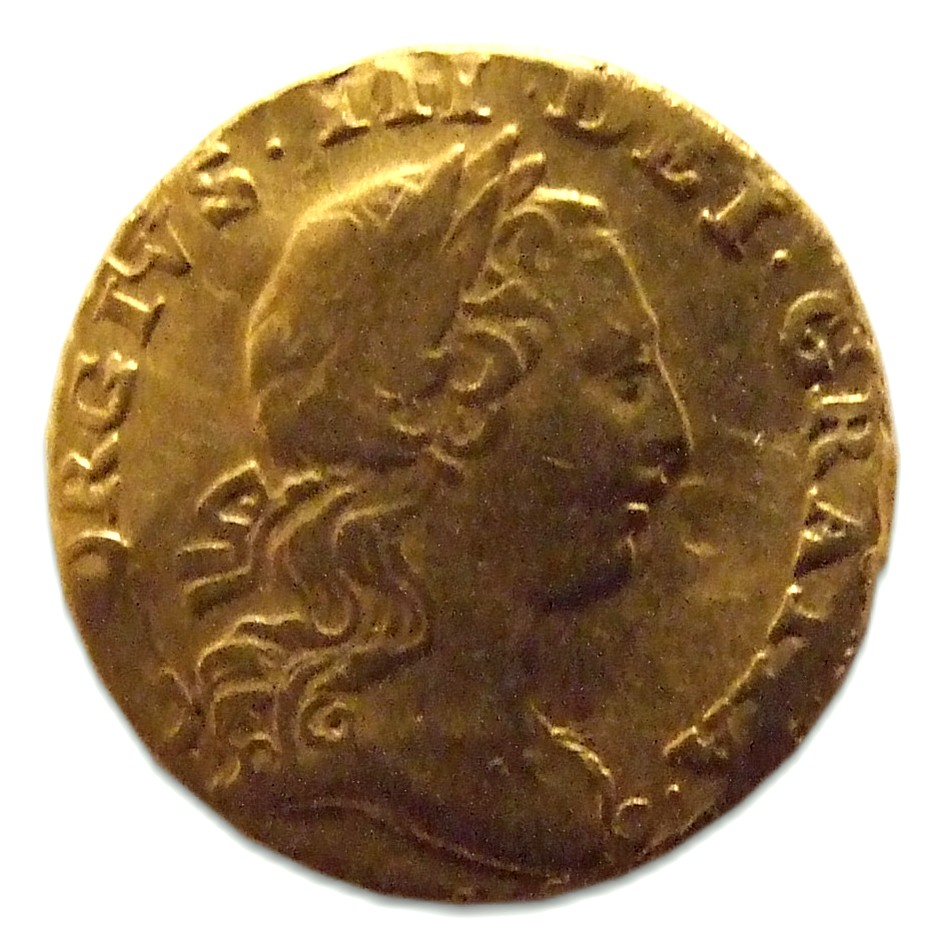
- Design: Portrait of George III
- Designer: Richard Yeo

Reverse
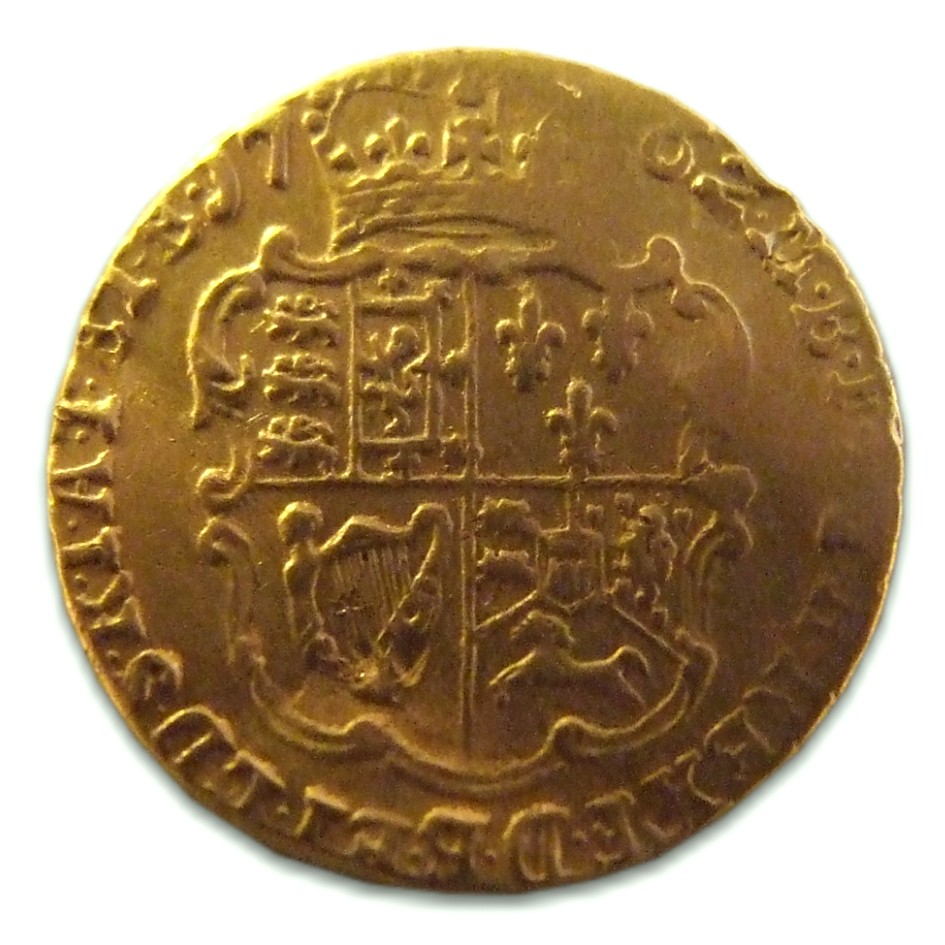
- Designer: Royal Arms of Great Britain in a shield

The quarter guinea was a British coin minted only in the years 1718 and 1762. As the name implies, it was valued at one-fourth of a guinea, which at that time was worth twenty-one shillings (£1.05). The quarter guinea therefore was valued at five shillings and threepence in sterling specie.

At the beginning of the reign of King George I (1714–1727) the price of silver had risen considerably, resulting in much British silver coinage being melted down and few silver coins' being struck. Isaac Newton, the Master of the Mint, wrote a minute dated 21 September 1717 in which he blamed the rising price of silver on the overvaluation of the guinea at twenty-one shillings and sixpence. Newton's memo resulted in a Proclamation of 20 December reducing the value of the guinea to twenty-one shillings. In 1718 it was decided to strike a new gold coin equal to a quarter guinea to provide useful coin worth approximately the same as the five-shilling silver crown.

The new coin had to be proportionate in size to the other gold denominations, and this resulted in a coin which weighed 2.1 grams and was 16 millimetres in diameter. It had not been realised at the time that a coin of this size was impracticably small to use, and would prove unpopular. 37,380 coins were minted, but many of them were put aside as keepsakes and many of the rest were lost. The coin was discontinued after 1718, and for the next few years there was an increased output of guineas and half guineas.

Despite its minuscule size, the coin took the form of a scaled-down version of the guinea and half guinea, including all the intricate cruciform shields on the reverse and all the king's Hanoverian titles. The coin is a fine example of the mint's work, although a magnifying glass is needed to properly appreciate it. The obverse shows a right-facing portrait of the king with the legend GEORGIVS D G M BR FR ET HIB REX F D, abbreviation for Georgius, Dei Gratia Magna Britannia, Francia, et Hibernia Rex, Fidei Defensor, which is Latin for "George, by the Grace of God King of Great Britain, France and Ireland, Defender of the Faith". The reverse shows four crowned cruciform shields separated by sceptres, with a central Star of the Order of the Garter, and the legend BRVN ET L DVX S R I A TH ET PR EL 1718 – Brunswick et Luneburg Dux, Sacrum Romanum Imperatoria Arch-Tresorum et Princeps-Elector, Latin for "Duke of Brunswick and Lüneburg, Arch-Treasurer and Prince Elector of the Holy Roman Empire". The dies for all quarter-guineas of King George I were engraved by John Croker, who was originally from Dresden.

When George III came to the throne in 1760, the price of silver had again risen dramatically. Despite the unpopularity of the 1718 quarter guinea it was considered necessary to produce this coin again, to the same size and weight as before, to fill the gap between the low-denomination silver coins and the larger gold coins. It met the same fate as its predecessor and was only produced in 1762. The obverse shows a right-facing portrait of the king with the legend GEORGIVS III DEI GRATIA, while the reverse shows a large crowned shield bearing the arms of England and Scotland, France, Ireland, and Hanover, and the legend M B F ET H REX F D B ET L D S R I A T ET E 1762 – abbreviation for Magna Britannia, Francia, et Hibernia Rex, Fidei Defensor, Brunswick et Luneburg Dux, Sacrum Romanum Imperatori Arch-Tresorum et Elector - Latin for "King of Great Britain, France, and Ireland; Defender of the Faith, Duke of Brunswick and Lüneburg, [and] Arch-Treasurer and Elector of the Holy Roman Empire".
