= Half laurel =

Coin of the Kingdom of England

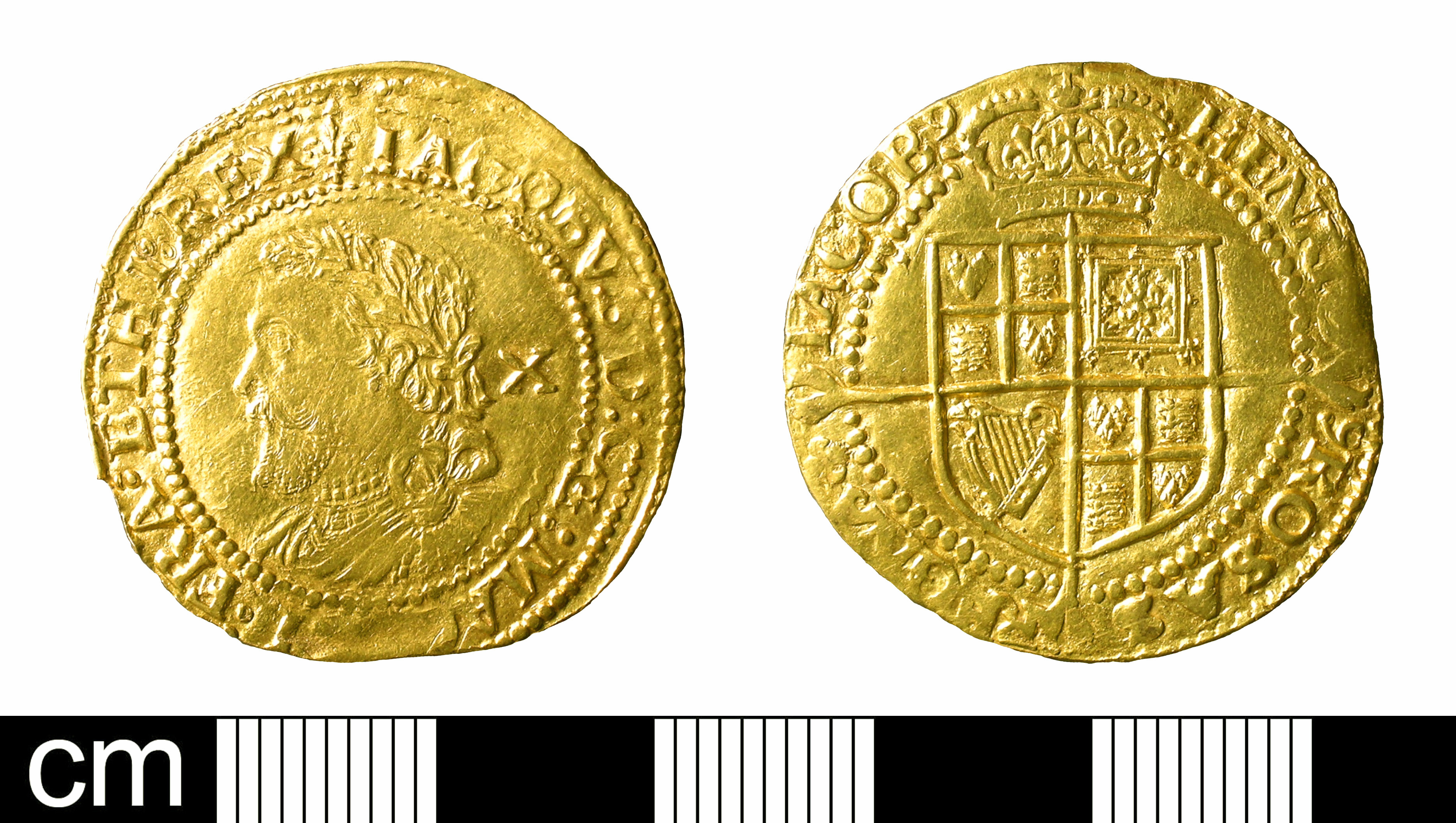
Half laurel of James I, 1623 or 1624

The half laurel was a coin of the Kingdom of England minted between 1619 and 1625, with a value of ten shillings (half a pound, or half a laurel).

The half laurel was the third English gold coin with a value of ten shillings produced during the reign of King James I. It was named after the laurel that the king is portrayed as wearing on his head, but it is considerably poorer in both quality and style than both the half sovereign and the double crown which preceded it. The coin was produced during James I's third coinage (1619–1625). All the coins were produced at the Tower Mint in the City of London.

The half laurel was introduced to replace the double crown of 1604, which had an initial value of ten shillings but whose value had been increased to eleven shillings in 1612 because of the increasing value of gold; the need was felt for a ten-shilling coin in circulation again.

The King is looking to the left of the coin and has the value X for "10 shillings" to the right, behind the kings' head. The legend on the obverse reads IACOBUS D G MAG BRI FRA ET HIB REX – James, by the grace of God King of Great Britain, France, and Ireland – while the reverse shows a long cross over a crowned shield with the arms of the four countries, and the legend HENRIC ROSAS REGNA IACOB[US] – Henry [united] the roses, James the kingdoms.
