= Spur ryal =

English coin

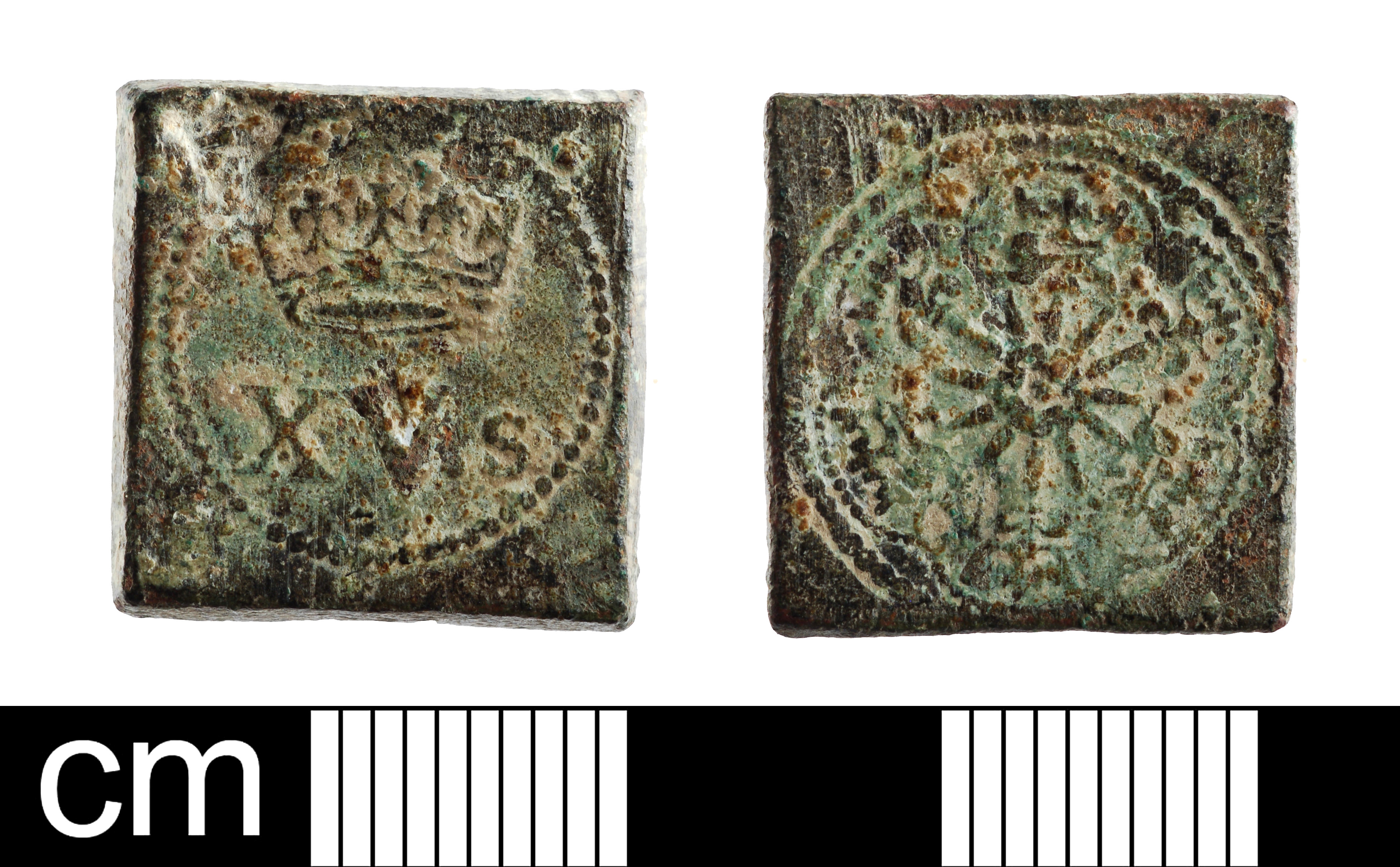
Coin weight for a spur ryal, with fifteen-shilling value marked.

The Spur Ryal was an extremely rare English gold coin issued in the reign of King James I. The coin is a development of the earlier Rose Noble, or Ryal which was worth ten shillings when issued by Kings Edward IV and Henry VII, and fifteen shillings when issued by Queens Mary and Elizabeth I.

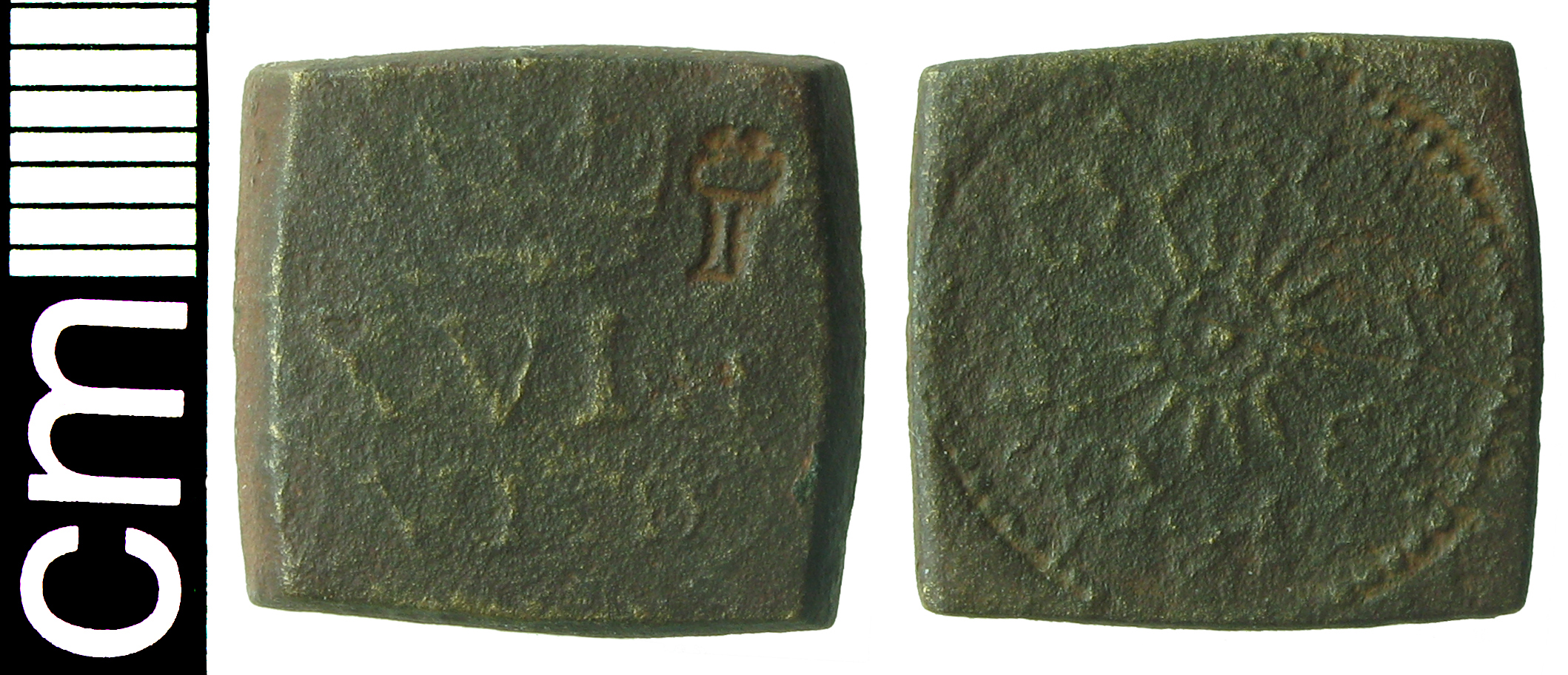
Coin weight for a later spur ryal, with sixteen-and-six value marked by Roman numerals XVI VI.

The Spur Ryal, so called because the sun and rose on the reverse resemble a spur, was introduced during James I's second coinage (1604–1619) when it initially had a value of fifteen shillings (15/-, £3/4), but in line with all gold coins its value was raised by one-tenth in 1612, to sixteen shillings and sixpence (16/6; £33/40). The design of this first issue shows on the obverse the king in a ship holding a sword and shield, surrounded by the legend IACOBUS DG MAG BRIT FRAN ET HIB REX — "James by the grace of God King of Great Britain France and Ireland". The reverse shows a rose over a radiant star, with a lion and crown in each quarter surrounded by the legend A. DNO FACTUM EST ISTUD ET EST MIRABILE (shorthand for the Latin A DOMINO FACTUM EST ISTUD ET EST MIRABILE) — "This is the Lord's doing and it is marvellous (in our eyes)".

During James' third coinage (1619–25) a new-style lighter spur ryal was issued with the value and weight reduced to fifteen shillings (15/-). On the obverse is a lion holding a sceptre over the royal shield which divides the value XV for fifteen shillings, surrounded by the legend IACOBUS DG MAG BRIT FRA ET HI REX -- James by the grace of God King of Great Britain France and Ireland. The reverse shows, as before, a rose over a radiant star, with a lion and crown in each quarter surrounded by the legend A. DNO FACTUM EST ISTUD ET EST MIRABILE — This is the Lord's doing and it is marvellous (in our eyes).
