= Quarter sovereign =

British gold bullion and collectors' coin

- United Kingdom
- Value: £0.25 pound sterling
- Mass: 1.997 g
- Diameter: 13.5 mm
- Edge: Milled
- Composition: .917 gold, .083 copper or other metals
- Gold: .0588 troy oz
- Years of minting: 2009–present

Obverse
- Design: Reigning British monarch (Elizabeth II shown)

Reverse
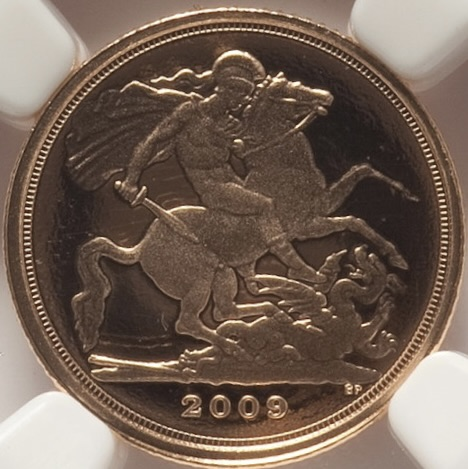
- Design: Saint George and the Dragon
- Designer: Benedetto Pistrucci
- Design date: 1817 (first used on quarter sovereign in 2009)

The quarter sovereign is a British sterling gold bullion and collector's coin, issued by the Royal Mint since 2009. The smallest in the sovereign range, it has a nominal value of 1/4 of a pound, or 25 pence (£0.25). (Note: Five shillings before Decimal Day, 1971. This is only the face value as a denomination of sterling; the gold within the coin is worth significantly more.)

In 1853, the Royal Mint produced two patterns for a quarter sovereign for circulation, with one denominated as five shillings. (Note: Until 1971, Britain used a monetary system where 20 shillings equalled one pound sterling; thereafter the pound was divided into 100 pence.) These coins never went into production, due to concerns about their small size and the likely wear in circulation. Gold passed from circulation in the aftermath of the First World War.

Beginning in 1979, the Royal Mint began to sell sovereigns to those wishing to own gold coins, by the following year selling four different denominations, ranging from the half sovereign to the five-pound gold coin. In 2009, a quarter sovereign was introduced as an extension of this range. The quarter sovereign shares the same design as the larger coins, depicting on the obverse the reigning monarch, Elizabeth II or, since 2022, Charles III. Although there are some one-year designs, the one most often used on the reverse of these issues is Benedetto Pistrucci's depiction of Saint George and the Dragon, which was first used on the sovereign in 1817.

== Victorian pattern coin ==
Pattern gold coins valued at a quarter sovereign (five shillings) were struck in 1853, as the Royal Mint reconsidered which denominations were to be struck in gold and which in silver. At this time, the mint could not process both gold and silver simultaneously, and such a coin was seen as an alternative to the larger silver coins, such as the florin and half crown. In 1853, there was heavy demand for coins of both metals, but the Royal Mint gave priority to the more valuable gold coinage, such as the sovereign (the gold coin valued at one pound sterling). On 7 March 1853, the Chancellor of the Exchequer, William Gladstone, explained to the House of Commons that the demand for gold was so heavy that there was no opportunity for the Royal Mint to coin silver.

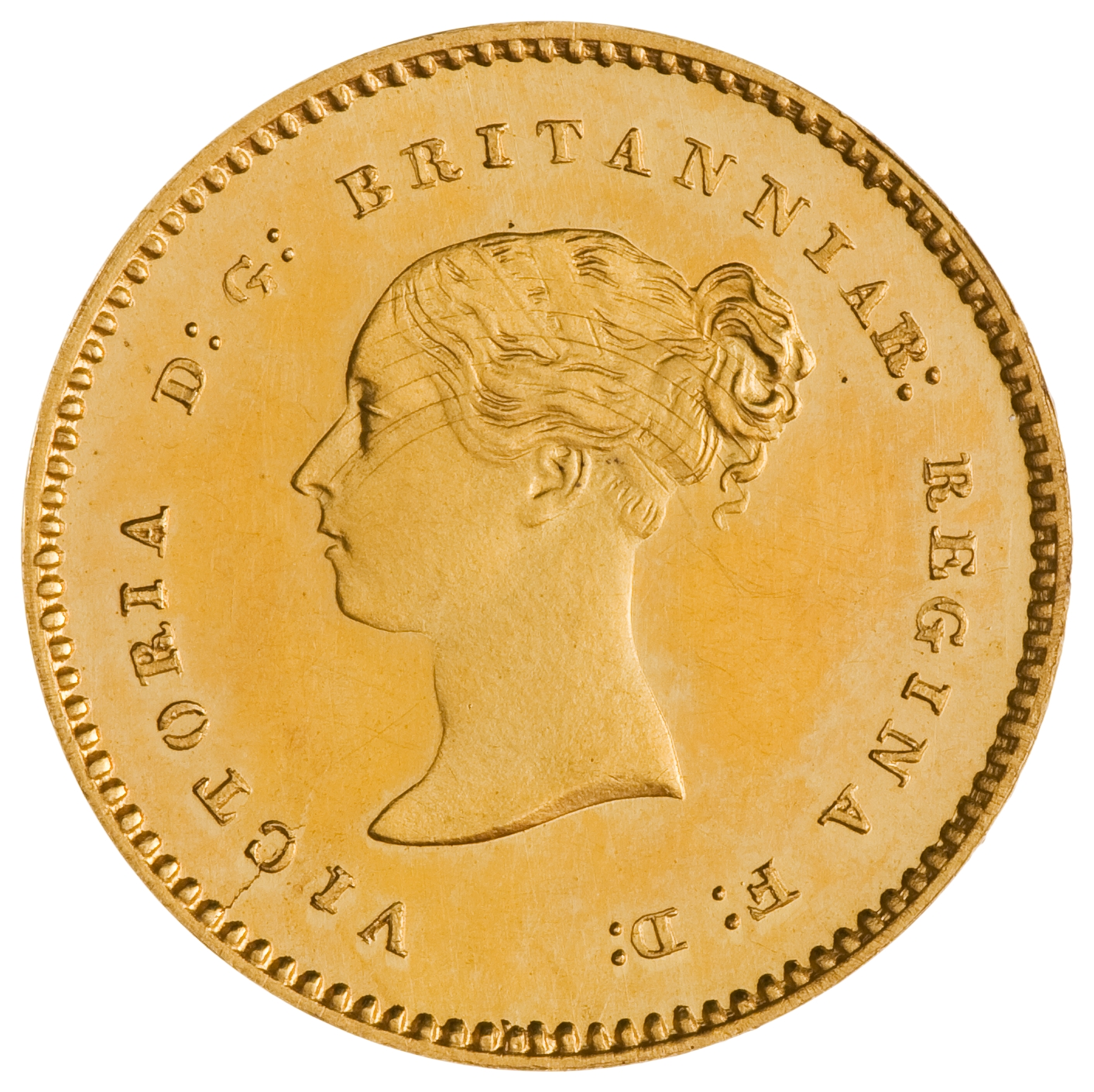
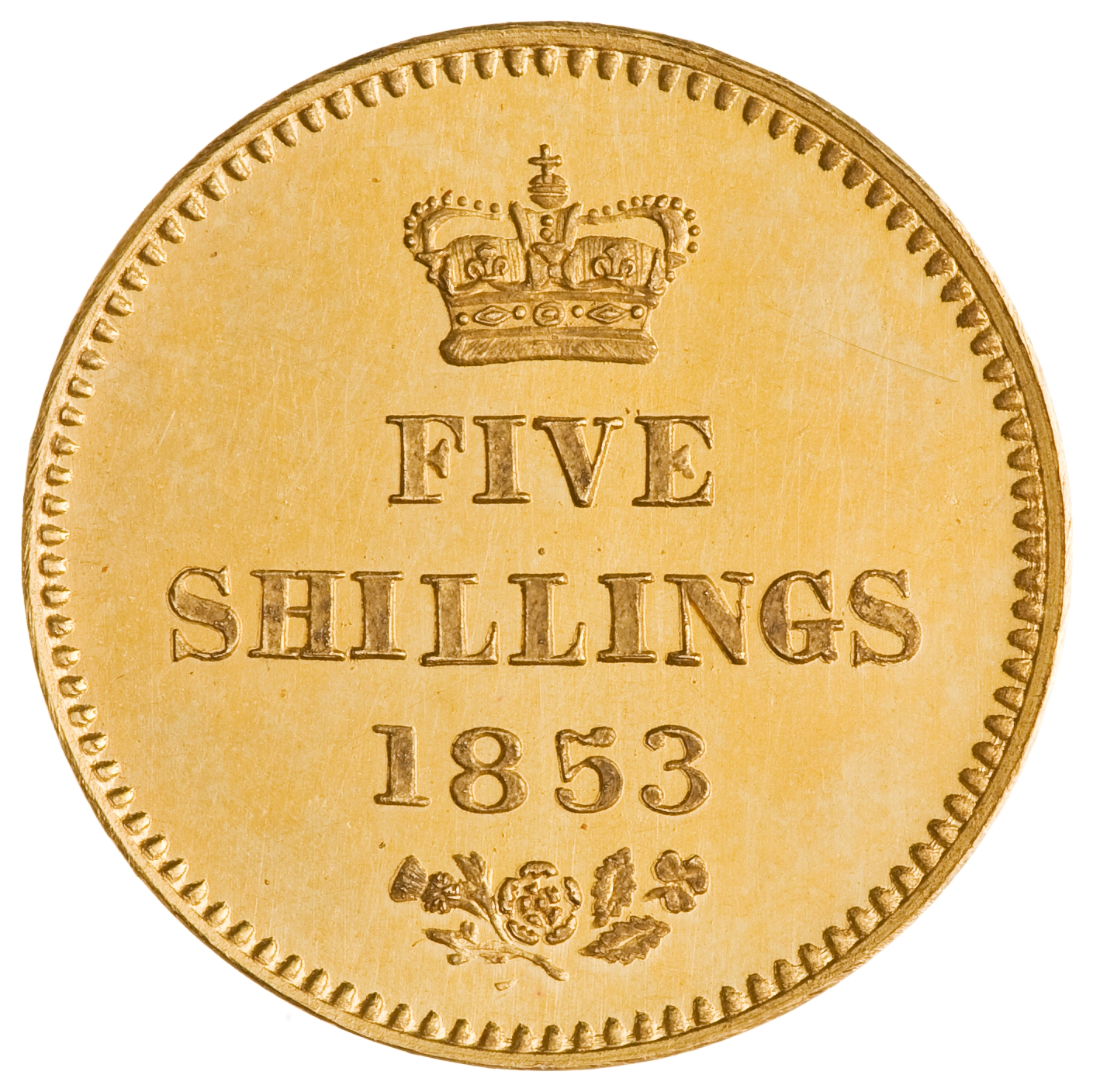
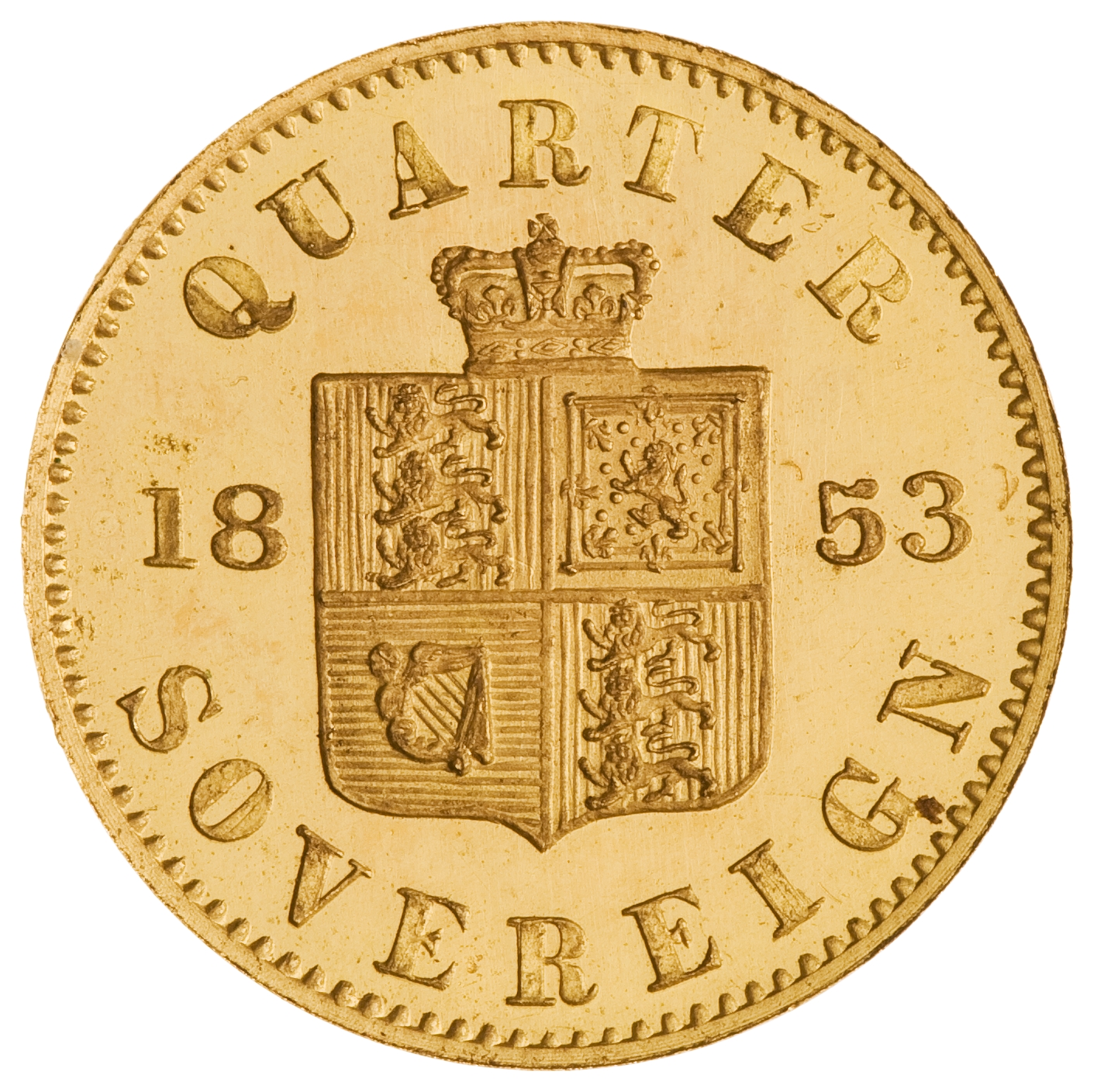
The two patterns struck in 1853. The common obverse is to the left of the two reverses.

During the 18 April 1853 sitting of the House of Commons, either Edward Divett (per Hansard) or the former chancellor, Benjamin Disraeli (per a press account), asked the Financial Secretary to the Treasury, James Wilson, if consideration had been given to striking a quarter sovereign. Wilson replied that the government had directed that a die be prepared as an experiment. He noted that one difficulty with such a coin was that it would take four times as long to coin the same gold as with a sovereign. Wilson stated that such a coin would be of very small size, about the size of an American one-dollar gold coin, which he held in his hand as he made his statement.

By the end of the month, the Master of the Mint, Sir John Herschel, was able to present to the Treasury two quarter-sovereign pattern coins. Both of the patterns depicted, on the obverse, Queen Victoria as shown on the early issues of sovereigns of her reign, with her name and abbreviated titles. The reverse of one of the patterns was inscribed FIVE SHILLINGS 1853 with a crown above the inscription and a rose, thistle and shamrock below it. The other had the inscription QUARTER SOVEREIGN 1853, with, between the 8 and the 5, a crowned square shield of arms.

The report that Herschel presented with the pattern coins demonstrated that it would be very expensive to strike them for commerce, as they would have to meet exacting standards, and would wear quickly in circulation. Herschel explained that such a coin would circulate faster than larger gold coins, leading to increased wear, and that the very small size would make the coin easy to lose. The light weight would make it difficult to detect counterfeits. He estimated that gold would be lost to the public (either through misplacing the coins or through abrasion) at fifteen times the rate for the same value of sovereigns.

At the time, a parliamentary select committee was considering decimal coinage, and both Herschel and Thomson Hankey, former governor of the Bank of England, gave evidence before it. William Miller of the Bank of England also testified. All opposed the quarter sovereigns due to the expense of striking and maintaining them, and the committee did not recommend the quarter sovereign. No further action was taken on the quarter sovereign proposal; numismatic writer G. P. Dyer suggested that Herschel would not have spoken so negatively about the quarter sovereign to the select committee unless he knew the proposal was doomed. A quarter sovereign was proposed again by the new Master of the Mint, Thomas Graham, in 1859, but was turned down by Gladstone.

Pieces purporting to be quarter sovereigns dated 1911 or 1922 are not genuine, but are modern inventions.

== 21st-century bullion and collector's coin ==
=== Background and authorisation ===
Striking of sovereigns for circulation had come to an end by 1932, with most issues after the start in 1914 of the First World War coined at the branches of the Royal Mint in Australia and South Africa, where economic conditions were different than in Britain. In 1979, the Royal Mint struck sovereigns for sale to collectors. The following year, it coined, also for collector sale, the sovereign as well as the half sovereign, double sovereign, and five-pound piece. These four denominations continued to be issued in most years, sold at a premium to their gold value. In 1987, the Royal Mint started to issue the Britannia gold issues, bullion pieces issued in competition with those of other nations. Despite the issue of the Britannia pieces, the sovereign range continued to be struck, as the Royal Mint found that the sovereign's history meant that some preferred it to the Britannia; others admired the sovereign's design.

In 2009, the Royal Mint added quarter sovereigns to the range. Since 21st-century gold coins do not go into circulation, the objections of the 1850s did not apply. The quarter sovereign's specifications and design were stated in a proclamation by the monarch, Elizabeth II (r. 1952–2022), dated 10 December 2008 and effective the following day.

=== Designs ===
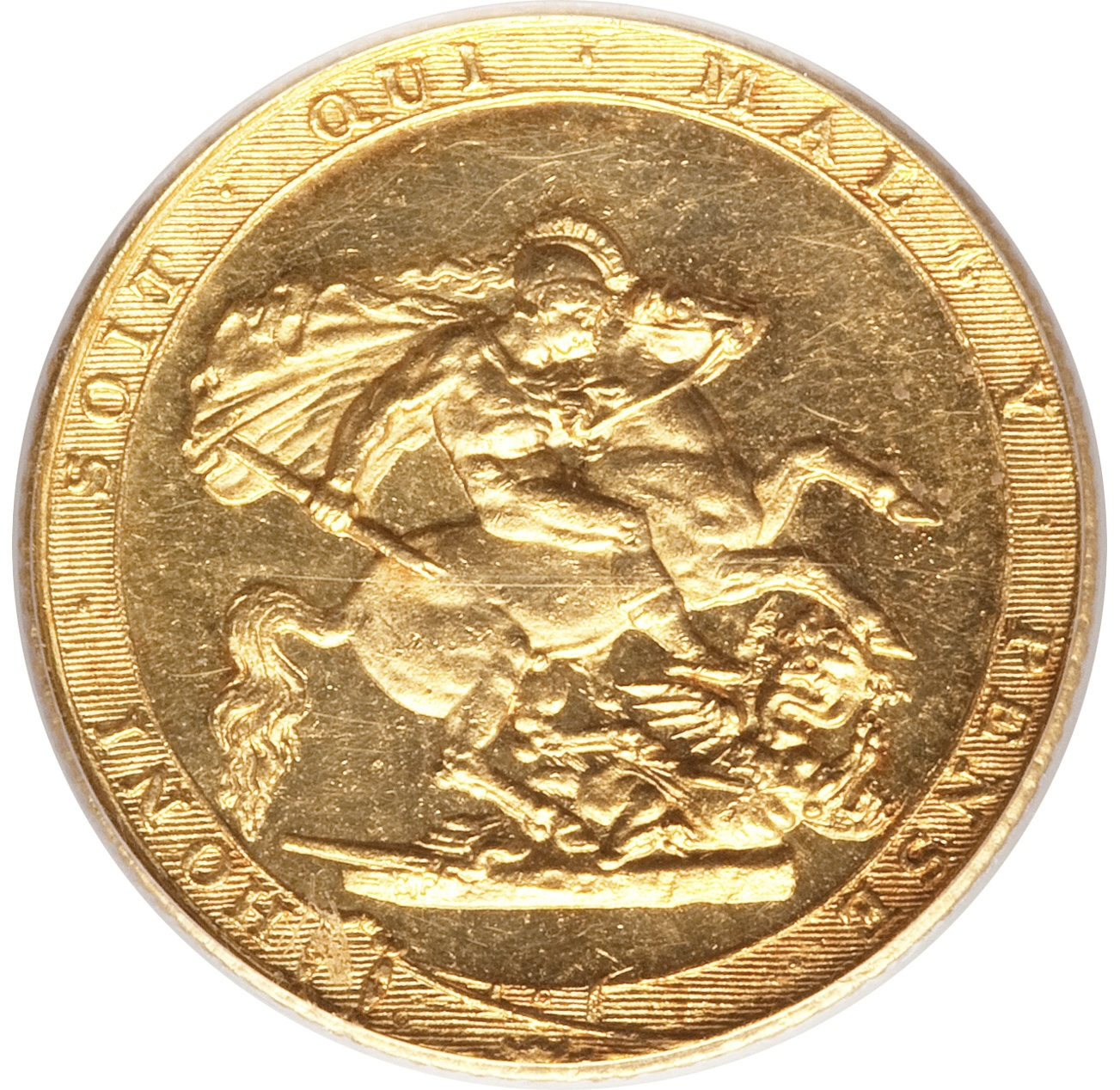
This design for the 1817 sovereign was reused for the sovereign range coins in 2017.

The quarter sovereign has not been given its own design, but uses a smaller version of those given to the other coins in the sovereign range, with the obverse depicting the reigning monarch. Initially, an obverse designed by Ian Rank-Broadley was used. Beginning with some 2015 issues, an obverse portrait of Elizabeth by Jody Clark was used, though in 2016, some coins bore a different portrait of the queen by James Butler. In most years, the sovereign-range coins have featured, on the reverse, Benedetto Pistrucci's depiction of Saint George and the Dragon that first appeared on the sovereign in 1817. Other reverse designs used include another interpretation of the George and Dragon, by Paul Day for Elizabeth II's Diamond Jubilee in 2012. In 2017, coins with the original, 1817 sovereign reverse design were struck, for its bicentennial.

In 2022, the Royal Mint struck quarter sovereigns with a reverse design by Noad showing an interpretation of the Royal Arms, marking the Platinum Jubilee of Elizabeth II. Later in the year, following the death of Elizabeth II, the Royal Mint issued memorial coins in the sovereign range, including the quarter sovereign, featuring on the obverse, the first coinage portrait of Elizabeth's successor, Charles III (r. 2022), by Martin Jennings. The reverse displayed an interpretation of the Royal Arms by Clark. In 2023, a quarter sovereign commemorating the coronation of Charles III was struck, with the obverse a crowned portrait of the king by Jennings and the reverse the Pistrucci George and Dragon. For 2024, Jennings' uncrowned portrait of Charles was paired with Pistrucci's reverse on each of the five sovereign denominations struck in proof condition, from the quarter sovereign to the five-pound piece. For 2025, Pistrucci's reverse was used on some coins, with others featuring Jean Baptiste Merlen's Royal Arms reverse, first used on the sovereign in 1825, for its 200th anniversary. For 2026, the sovereign range returned to yellow-coloured gold from rose and added security features amid strong demand and price rises for gold.

=== Issuance ===
From 2009 to 2012 the quarter sovereign was sold as a bullion piece, with authorised mintages of between 50,000 and 250,000, though the actual numbers sold are unreported. Such bullion issues are sold based on the price of gold, carrying a smaller premium than proof coins, with a sufficient premium charged to allow for the costs of manufacture and sale. Both varieties of the 2022 quarter sovereign were sold by the Royal Mint as bullion pieces, as well as in proof condition; the same is true of the 2023 coronation issue, as well as that for 2024 and 2026.

The quarter sovereign has been sold as a collector's coin, usually in proof condition, each year since 2009, though only in 2009 (13,495 pieces struck) did the reported mintage reach 10,000. In addition to being sold individually, these collector's coins have been available for purchase as part of a proof set of between three and five of the sovereign denominations. In 2023, the Royal Mint sold the Coronation quarter sovereign in proof condition for £235.00, and in uncirculated condition for £132.39 or £134.97, depending on what packaging is used. By the time of the 2026 issue the previous November, the price for a bullion quarter sovereign was £252.58.

== See also ==
- Half sovereign
- Double sovereign
- Twenty-five pence coin
- Crown

== Sources ==
- Clancy, Kevin (2017) [2015]. A History of the Sovereign: Chief Coin of the World (2nd ed.). Llantrisant, Wales: Royal Mint Museum. ISBN 978-1-869917-00-5.
- Dyer, G. P. (1997). "Quarter-sovereigns and other small gold patterns of the mid-Victorian period" (PDF). British Numismatic Journal. 67: 73–83.
- Hocking, William John (1906). Catalogue of the Coins, Tokens, Medals, Dies, and Seals in the Museum of the Royal Mint. Vol. 1. London: Darling & Son on behalf of His Majesty's Stationery Office. OCLC 4976846.
- Marsh, Michael A. (2017) [1980]. The Gold Sovereign (rev. ed.). Exeter, Devon: Token Publishing Ltd. ISBN 978-1-908828-36-1.
- Spink & Son Ltd (2022). Coins of England and the United Kingdom, Decimal Issues 2023 (9th ed.). London: Spink & Son Ltd. ISBN 978-1-912667-93-2.
