= Third guinea =

British gold coin

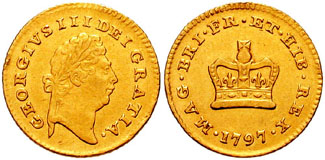
Third guinea coin of George III

The seven shilling piece was introduced in Great Britain by a proclamation of 29 November 1797. It has been called a third guinea, a guinea being worth 21 shillings in sterling specie. The gold coin was minted only in the reign of George III.

== Background ==
When it was introduced in 1797, during the French Revolutionary wars, the financial situation at the Bank of England was precarious: gold was in short supply and banknotes were given legal tender status in any amount. In order to pay the Bank's dividends it was decided to produce what at the time was known as seven-shilling pieces, with odd amounts of the dividend being paid in silver coins.

== Details ==
A total of £315,000 worth of coins was authorised in October 1797. The denomination was struck each year until 1813, with the exception of 1805, 1807, and 1812. Between 1800 and 1812 third and half guineas were the only gold coins issued.

The coin weighed 2.8 grams and was 17 millimetres in diameter with a milled edge. The design of the reverse changed in 1801 following the union of the parliaments of Great Britain and Ireland, when simultaneously the king relinquished his claim to the French throne (some four hundred years after it had ceased to mean anything). There were two obverses used, with different portraits of the king (the new one being introduced in 1804), with the legend GEORGIVS III DEI GRATIA. The design of the reverse was a crown, with the legend MAG BRI FR ET HIB REX date (to 1800) or FIDEI DEFENSOR BRITANNIARUM REX date (from 1801).
