= Rose Ryal =

Gold coin of the Kingdom of England

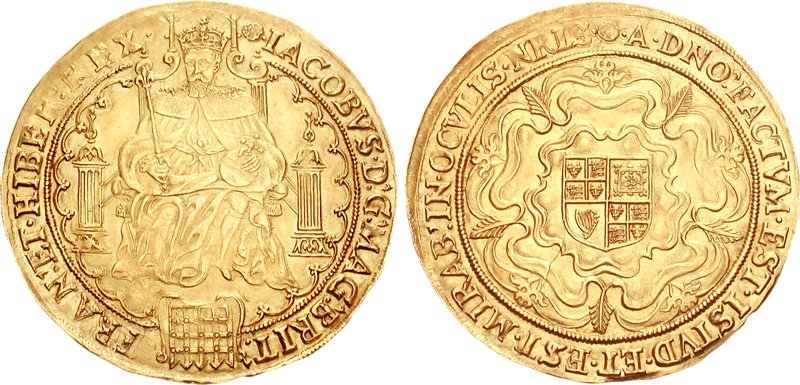
James I: Rose Ryal
• IACOBVS • D’. G’. MAG’. BRIT’. FRAN’. ET • HIBER’. REX •, James enthroned facing, scepter in right hand, orb in left, within tressure of arches; portcullis below	• A • DNO’. FACTVM • EST • ISTVD • ET • EST • MIRAB’. IN • OCVLIS • NRIS •, royal shield on rose.
AV Rose-ryal (13.68 g, 2h). Second coinage. London mint; im: rose. Struck 1605-1606.

The Rose Ryal is a gold coin of the Kingdom of England issued in the reign of King James I and is now very rare. The coin is really a two-ryal coin worth thirty shillings (i.e. 1 1/2 pounds) and is a development of the earlier fine sovereign of Queen Elizabeth I.

== Description ==
The Rose Ryal, so called because of the rose appearing on the reverse, was introduced during James I's second coinage (1604-1619). The design of this first issue shows on the obverse the king enthroned with a portcullis beneath his feet, surrounded by the legend IACOBUS DG MAG BRIT FRAN ET HIBER REX ("James, by the grace of God, of Great Britain, France and Ireland King"). The reverse shows the royal arms over a rose surrounded by the legend A. DNO FACTUM EST ISTUD ET EST MIRAB IN OCULIS NRIS ("This is the Lord's doing and it is marvellous in our eyes", from Psalm 118).

During James' third coinage (1619–1625) a new-style Rose Ryal was issued. On the reverse is the royal shield, with the value "XXX" over the shield and the whole surrounded by roses, lions, and lis, surrounded by the legend A. DNO FACTUM EST ISTUD ET EST MIRAB IN OCULIS NRIS, while the obverse shows a redesigned version of the enthroned king with a portcullis beneath, surrounded by the legend IACOBUS DG MA BRI FR ET HI REX.
