= Half guinea =

Gold coin of England and Great Britain

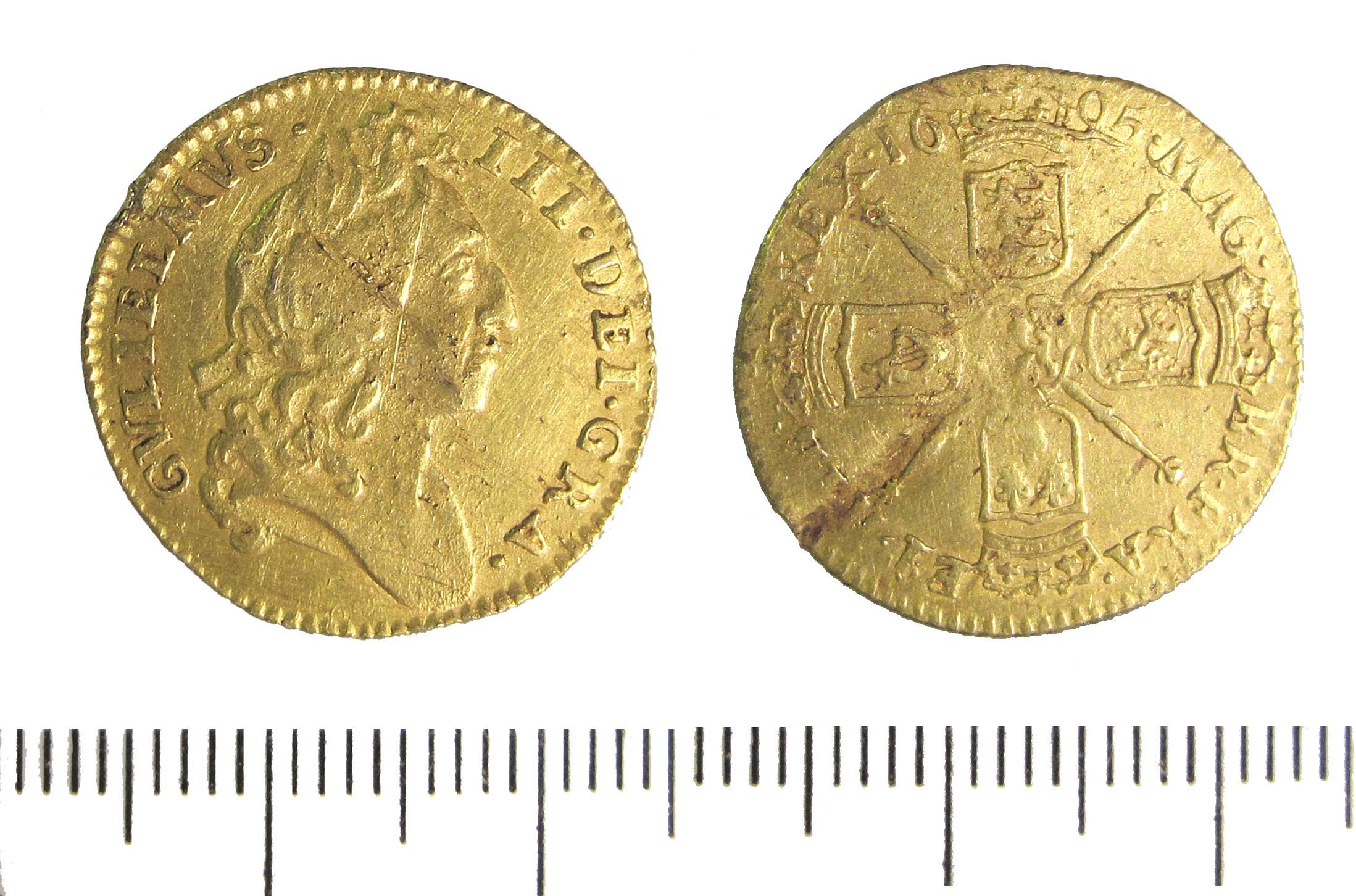
Half guinea of king William III, 1695.

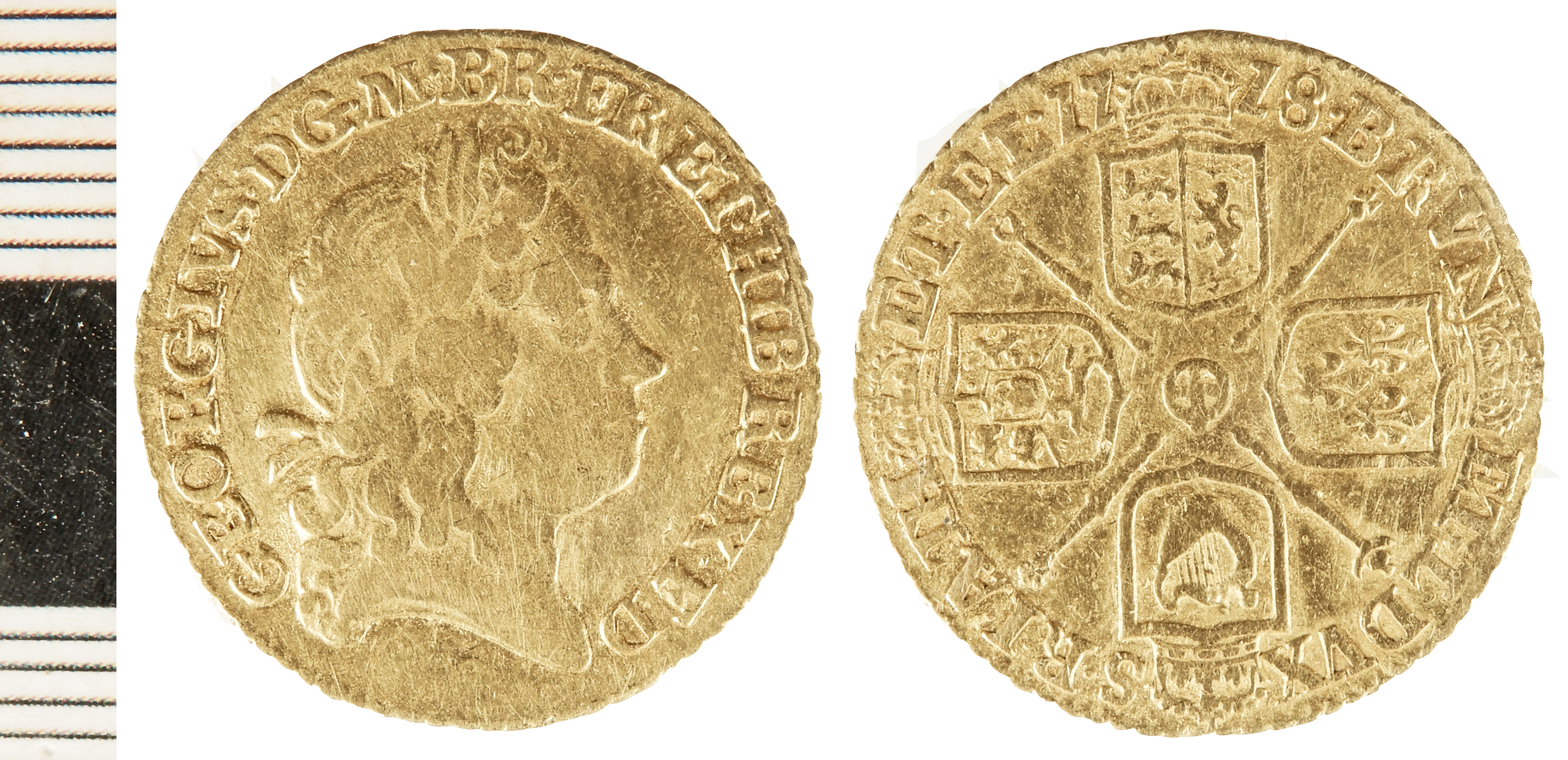
Half guinea of king George I, 1717.

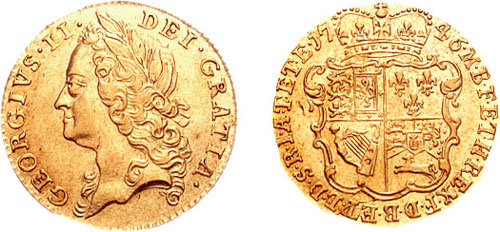
Half guinea of king George II, 1746.

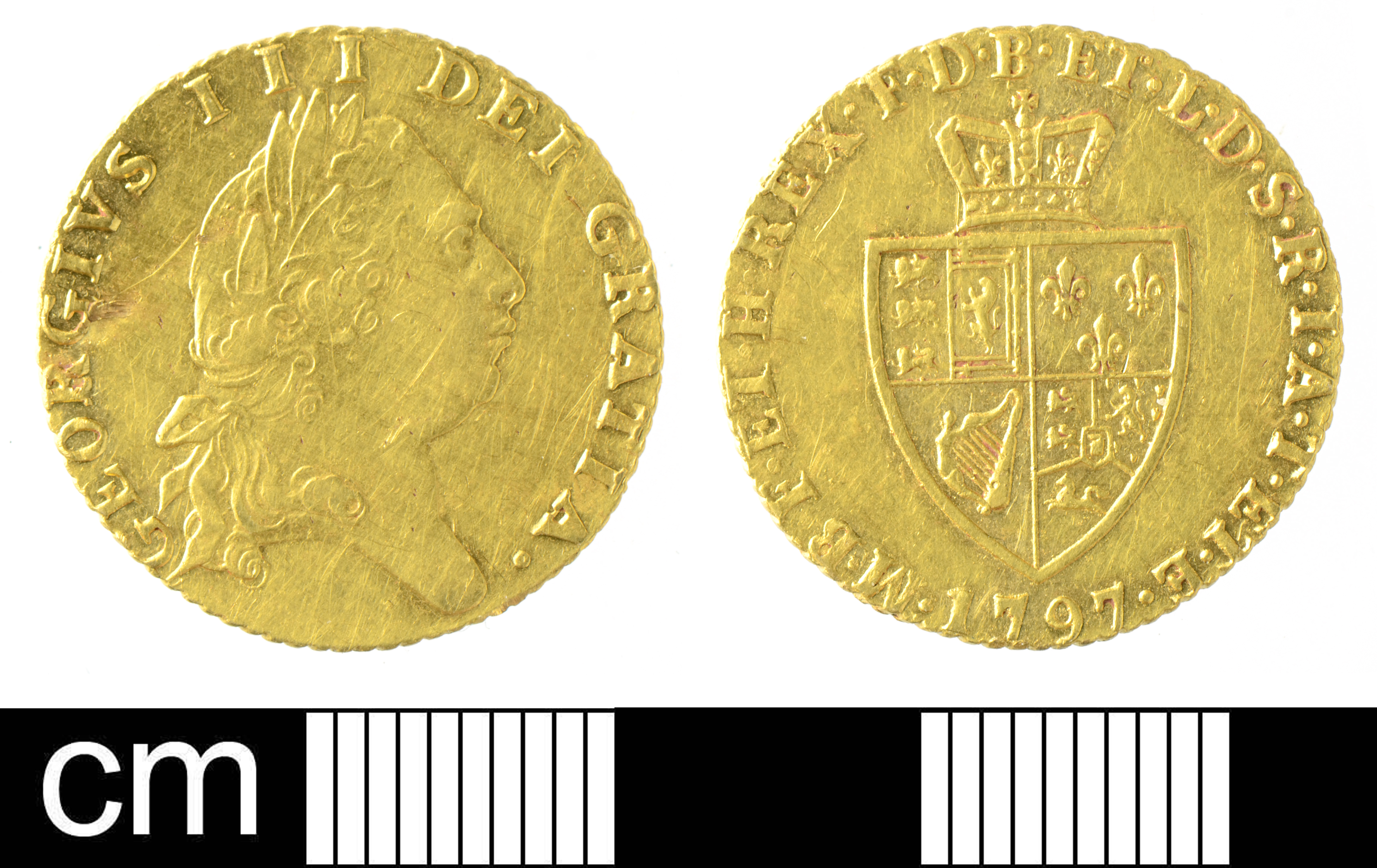
Half guinea of king George III, 1797.

The half guinea gold coin of the Kingdom of England and later of Great Britain was first produced in 1669, some years after the guinea entered circulation. It was officially eliminated in the Great Recoinage of 1816, although, like the guinea, it was used in quoting prices until decimalisation.

== Value ==
The price tag on the Hatter's hat reads "10/6", which was the value of a half guinea at that time.

The value of the guinea fluctuated over the years from twenty to thirty shillings, and back down to twenty-one shillings and sixpence by the start of George I's reign. A Royal Proclamation of December 1717 fixed the value of the guinea at twenty-one shillings. The value of the half guinea was thus fixed at ten shillings and sixpence (written as 10s. 6d. or 10/6).

A half-guinea weighed 64.719 grains (4.194 g; 0.135 ozt).

The present day value of a 1717 half guinea is about £92. A golden half guinea in fine condition would be worth considerably more.

== History ==
=== Charles II ===
During the reign of King Charles II, the elephant and castle logo of the Africa Company appeared on some coins from 1676 to 1684, although the denomination was produced in all years between 1669 and 1684. The coin weighed 4.2 grams and was 20 millimetres in diameter.

The obverse and reverse of this coin were designed by John Roettier (1631 – c. 1700). The obverse showed a fine right-facing bust of the king wearing a Laurel wreath, surrounded by the legend CAROLVS II DEI GRATIA, while the reverse showed four crowned cruciform shields bearing the arms of England, Scotland, France, and Ireland, between which were four sceptres, and in the centre were four interlinked "C"s, surrounded by the inscription MAG BR FRA ET HIB REX date. To avoid confusion with gilded silver coins the edge was milled to deter clipping or filing—in 1669 the milling was perpendicular to the coin, giving vertical grooves, while from 1670 the milling was diagonal to the coin.

=== James II ===
John Roettier continued to design the dies for this denomination in the reign of King James II. In this reign, the coins were of the same dimensions as before, and were minted in 1686-1688. The elephant and castle mark was only used on some coins in 1686, which are particularly scarce. The King's head faces left in this reign, and is surrounded by the inscription IACOBUS II DEI GRATIA, while the obverse is the same as in Charles II's reign except for omitting the interlinked "C"s in the centre of the coin. The edge of the coins are milled diagonally.

=== William and Mary ===
With the removal of James II in the Glorious Revolution of 1688, his daughter Mary, and her husband Prince William of Orange ruled jointly by agreement as co-monarchs. Their heads appear conjoined on the guinea piece in Roman style, with William's head uppermost, with the legend GVLIELMVS ET MARIA DEI GRATIA. In a departure from the previous reigns the reverse featured a totally new design of a large crowned shield which bore the arms of France in the first quarter, of Scotland in the second quarter, of Ireland in the third quarter, and of England in the fourth quarter, the whole ensemble having a small shield in the centre bearing the rampant lion of Nassau; the legend on the obverse read MAG BR FR ET HIB REX ET REGINA date. By the early part of this reign the value of the guinea had increased to nearly thirty shillings. The half guineas of this reign weighed 4.2 grams, were 20 millimetres in diameter. The credit for the design of the gold coinage of this reign is usually given to James and Norbert Roettier, but the 1689 coin bears somewhat caricatured heads of the monarchs, and it is thought that this is in the style of George Bower (d. 1689/90), an artist who designed the first type of penny and halfpenny of 1689 and also produced a number of medals with grotesque and cartoon-like busts. Records show that Bower was instructed in July 1689 'to make a puncheon for the Halfe Guinneys ande to worke it in the Mint'; the heads of the halfpenny, penny, and half guinea of 1689 don't share the harmony of design of later Roettier work. Half guineas were produced in all years between 1689 and 1694 with the elephant and castle appearing in 1691 and 1692.

=== William III ===
Following the death of Queen Mary from smallpox in 1694, William continued to reign as William III. The half guinea coin was produced in all years from 1695 to 1701, with the elephant and castle appearing on some coins from 1695, 1696, and 1698, the design probably being the work of James Roettier and John Croker.

The coins of William III's reign weighed 4.2 grams with a diameter of 20 millimetres. William's head faces right on his coins, with the legend GVLIELMVS III DEI GRATIA, while the reverse design of William and Mary's reign was judged to be unsuccessful, so the design reverted to that used by Charles II and James II, but with a small shield with the lion of Nassau in the centre, with the legend MAG BR FRA ET HIB REX date. The coin had a diagonal milled edge.

=== Anne ===
The reign of Queen Anne (1702–1714) produced pre-Union half guineas in 1702, 1703, and 1705. The 1703 half guinea bears the word VIGO under the Queen's bust, to commemorate the origin of the gold taken from the Spanish ships at the Battle of Vigo Bay. With the Union of England and Scotland the design of the reverse of the half guinea was changed. Until the Union, the cruciform shields on the reverse showed the arms of England, Scotland, France, and Ireland in order, separated by sceptres and with a central rose, and the legend MAG BR FRA ET HIB REG date. With the union, the English and Scottish arms appear conjoined on one shield, with the left half being the English arms and the right half being the Scottish arms, and the order of arms appearing on the shields becomes England+Scotland, France, England+Scotland, Ireland and the legend MAG BRI FR ET HIB REG date. The centre of the reverse design shows Star of the Order of the Garter. The coins weighed 4.2 grams, were 20 millimetres in diameter. The edge of the coin is milled diagonally.

The dies for all half-guineas of Queen Anne and King George I were engraved by John Croker, an immigrant originally from Dresden in the Duchy of Saxony.

=== George I ===
King George I's half guinea coins were struck between 1715 and 1727 except 1716, with the elephant and castle sometimes appearing in 1721. The coins weighed 4.2 grams, were 20 millimetres in diameter, with a diagonally milled edge.

The obverse shows the right-facing portrait of the king with the legend GEORGIVS D G M BR FR ET HIB REX F D. The reverse follows the same general design as before, except the order of the shields is England+Scotland, France, Ireland, and Hanover, with the legend BRVN ET L DVX S R I A TH ET EL date (Brunsuicensis Et Lueneburgensis Dux, Sacri Romani Imperii Archi-Tessarius et Elector, "Of Brunswick and Lüneburg Duke, of the Holy Roman Empire Arch-Treasurer and Elector").

=== George II ===
King George II's guinea pieces marks are a complex issue, with eight obverses and five reverses used through the 33 years of the reign. The coins were produced in all years of the reign except 1735, 1741, 1742, 1744, 1754, and 1757. The coins weighed 4.2 grams, and were 20 millimetres in diameter. Some coins issued between 1729 and 1739 carry the mark EIC under the king's head, to indicate the gold was provided by the East India Company, while some 1745 coins carry the mark LIMA to indicate the gold came from Admiral Anson's round-the-world voyage. The edge of the coin was milled diagonally, the coin being too thin to take the chevron milling applied to the larger gold coins from 1739.

The obverse has a left-facing bust of the king with the legend GEORGIVS II DEI GRATIA (GEORGIUS II DEI GRATIA between 1740 and 1745), while the reverse features a single large crowned shield with the quarters containing the arms of England+Scotland, France, Hanover, and Ireland, and the legend M B F ET H REX F D B ET L D S R I A T ET E(Magnae Britanniae Franciae Et Hiberniae Rex, Fidei Defensor, Brunsvicensis Et Lueneburgensis Dux, Sacri Romani Imperii Archi-Tessarius et Elector, "Of Great Britain, France and Ireland King, Defender of the Faith, of Brunswick and Lüneburg Duke, of the Holy Roman Empire Arch-Treasurer and Elector").

=== George III ===
The half guinea was minted in nearly all the years of the long reign of King George III (1760–1820).

The half guineas of George III weighed 4.2 grams and were 20 millimetres in diameter except from 1787 when they were 20-21 millimetres in diameter. They were issued with seven different obverses and three reverses in 1762-1766, 1768, 1769, 1772–1779, 1781, 1783–1798, 1800–1806, 1808–1811 and 1813. All the obverses show right-facing busts of the king with the legend GEORGIVS III DEI GRATIA with different portraits of the king. The reverse of half guineas issued between 1761 and 1786 show a crowned shield bearing the arms of England+Scotland, France, Ireland and Hanover, with the legend M B F ET H REX F D B ET L D S R I A T ET E date. In 1787 a new design of reverse featuring a spade-shaped shield was introduced, with the same legend; this has become known as the Spade Half-Guinea.

In 1774 almost 20 million worn guineas of William III and Queen Anne were melted down and recoined as guineas and half-guineas.

In 1801 the king relinquished his claim on the French throne, and the legend on the reverse was altered to reflect this, and the Hanoverian arms were removed from the coat of arms. The reverse of the 1801-1813 half guinea features a crowned shield within a Garter, with HONI SOIT QUI MAL Y PENSE on the Garter, and BRITANNIARUM REX FIDEI DEFENSOR around the edge, and date between the edge inscription and the garter.

=== Replacement ===
In the Great Recoinage of 1816, the half-guinea was replaced by the half sovereign, worth 10 shillings.

== See also ==
- For other denominations, see British coinage
