= Half sovereign =

British gold coin

- United Kingdom
- Value: £0.50 pound sterling
- Mass: 3.994 g (61.637 gr)
- Diameter: 19 mm
- Edge: Milled
- Composition: 22ct (91.67%) gold
- Gold: 0.1176 troy oz
- Years of minting: 1817–present
- Mint marks: I, M, P, S, SA. Found on reverse on exergue between design and date for Saint George and the Dragon coins, and under the shield for shield back coins.

Obverse
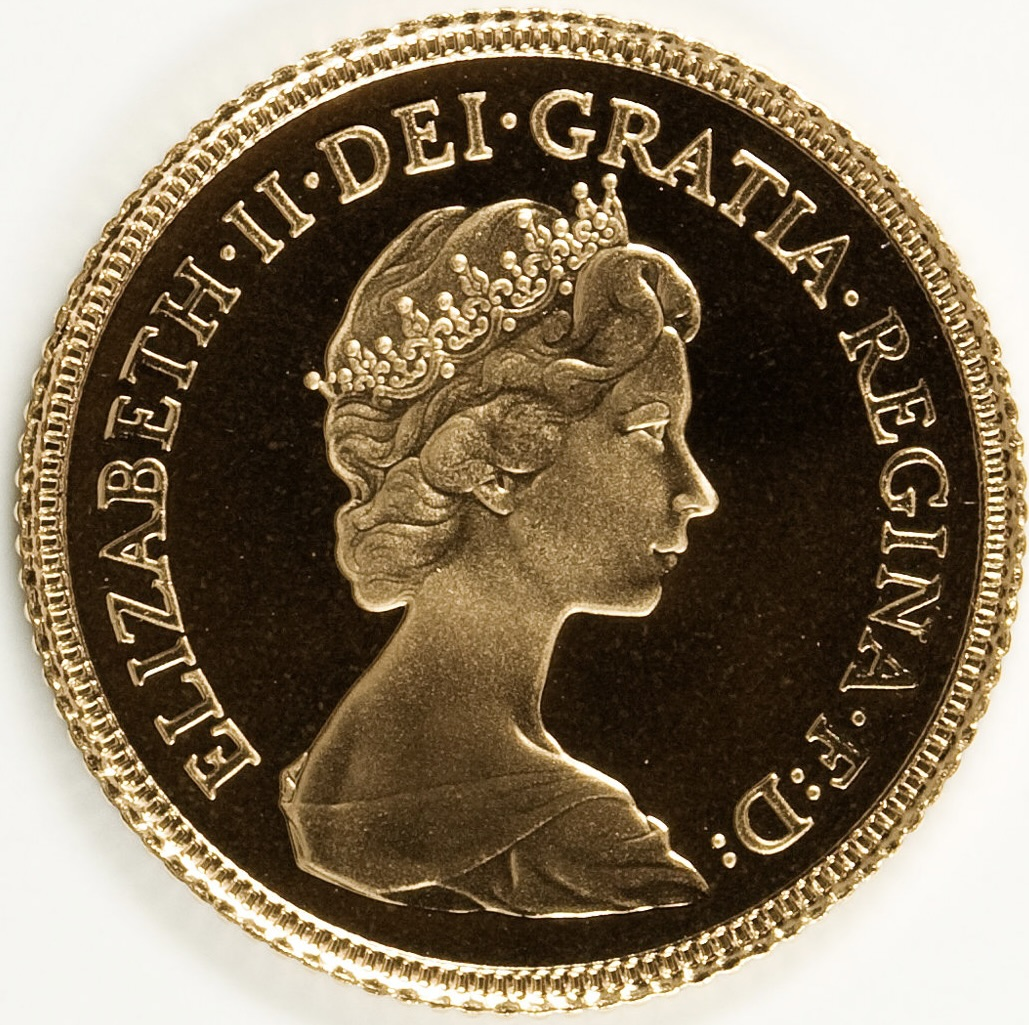
- Design: Portrait of reigning monarch. This coin shows Elizabeth II.

Reverse
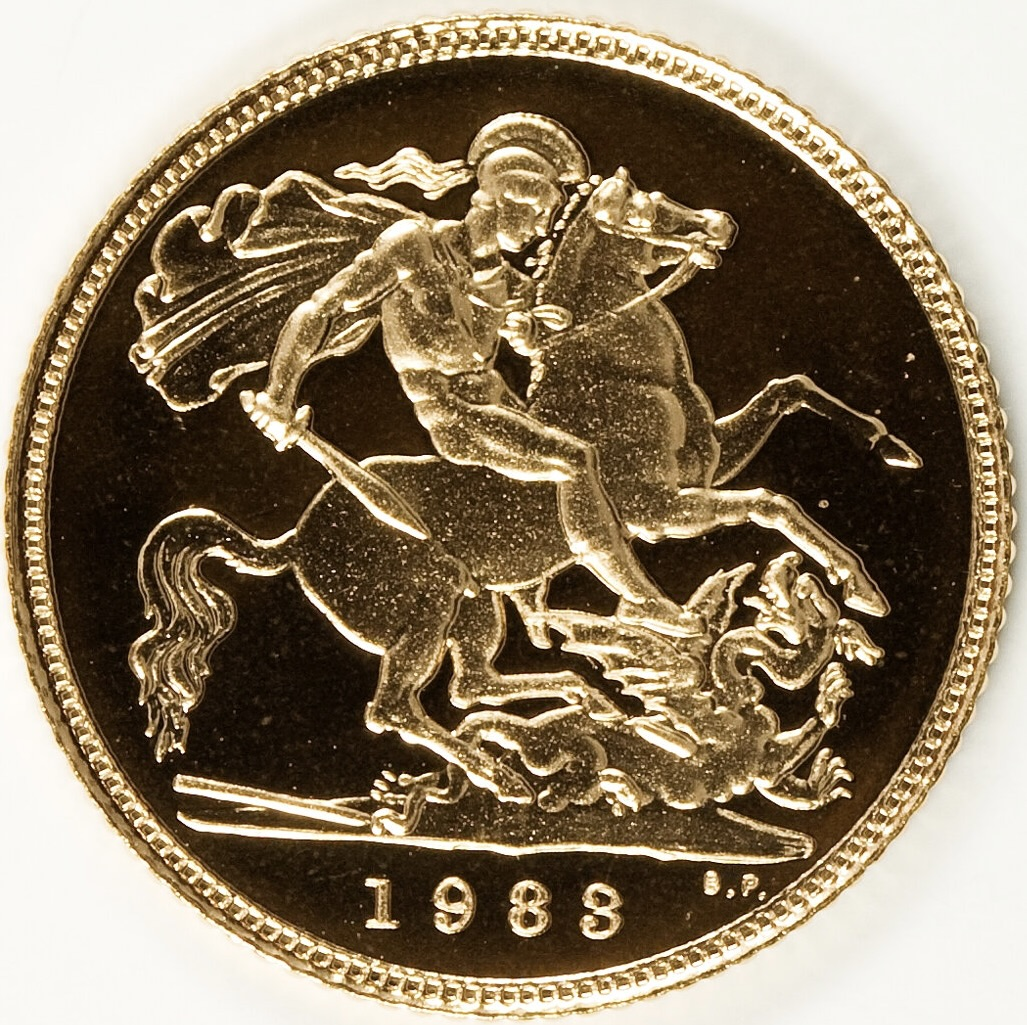
- Design: Saint George and the Dragon
- Designer: Benedetto Pistrucci
- Design date: 1817 (first used on half sovereign in 1893)

The half sovereign is a British sterling gold coin with a nominal face value of 1/2 of a pound, or 50 pence. (Note: Ten shillings before Decimal Day, 1971. This is only the face value as a denomination of sterling; the gold within the coin is worth significantly more.) First issued in its present form in 1817, it has been struck by the Royal Mint in most years since 1980 as a collector's and bullion piece.

The half sovereign was originally introduced in 1544 during the reign of Henry VIII but the issue was discontinued after 1604. In 1817, as part of the Great Recoinage, half sovereigns and sovereigns were reintroduced. Until it was discontinued as a currency coin in 1926, the half sovereign was struck in most years and circulated widely. In addition to being coined in London, it was struck at the colonial mints in Australia and South Africa. Exacting standards made it difficult to strike, and it was considered for elimination in the 1880s despite its popularity.

Production of half sovereigns continued until 1926 and, apart from special issues for coronation years, was suspended until 1980. Since then it has been struck for sale by the Royal Mint, although it does not circulate. In addition to the portrait of the reigning monarch, the coin features in most years an image of Saint George and the dragon, designed by Benedetto Pistrucci, first used on the sovereign in 1817 and the half-sovereign in 1893.

== English coin (1544–1604) ==
Henry VII (r. 1485–1509) revitalised England's economy following the War of the Roses. In 1489, he introduced the sovereign gold coin, which he valued at twenty shillings. Before the new denomination, the only gold coins being issued were angels and half angels.

Henry VII left a large treasury – the modern equivalent of about £375 million – to his successor Henry VIII (r. 1509–1547). The inherited wealth was dissipated due to Henry VIII's extravagant lifestyle and the war expenses needed to maintain a claim over France. These expenses led to the repeated debasement of the currency over the younger Henry's reign.

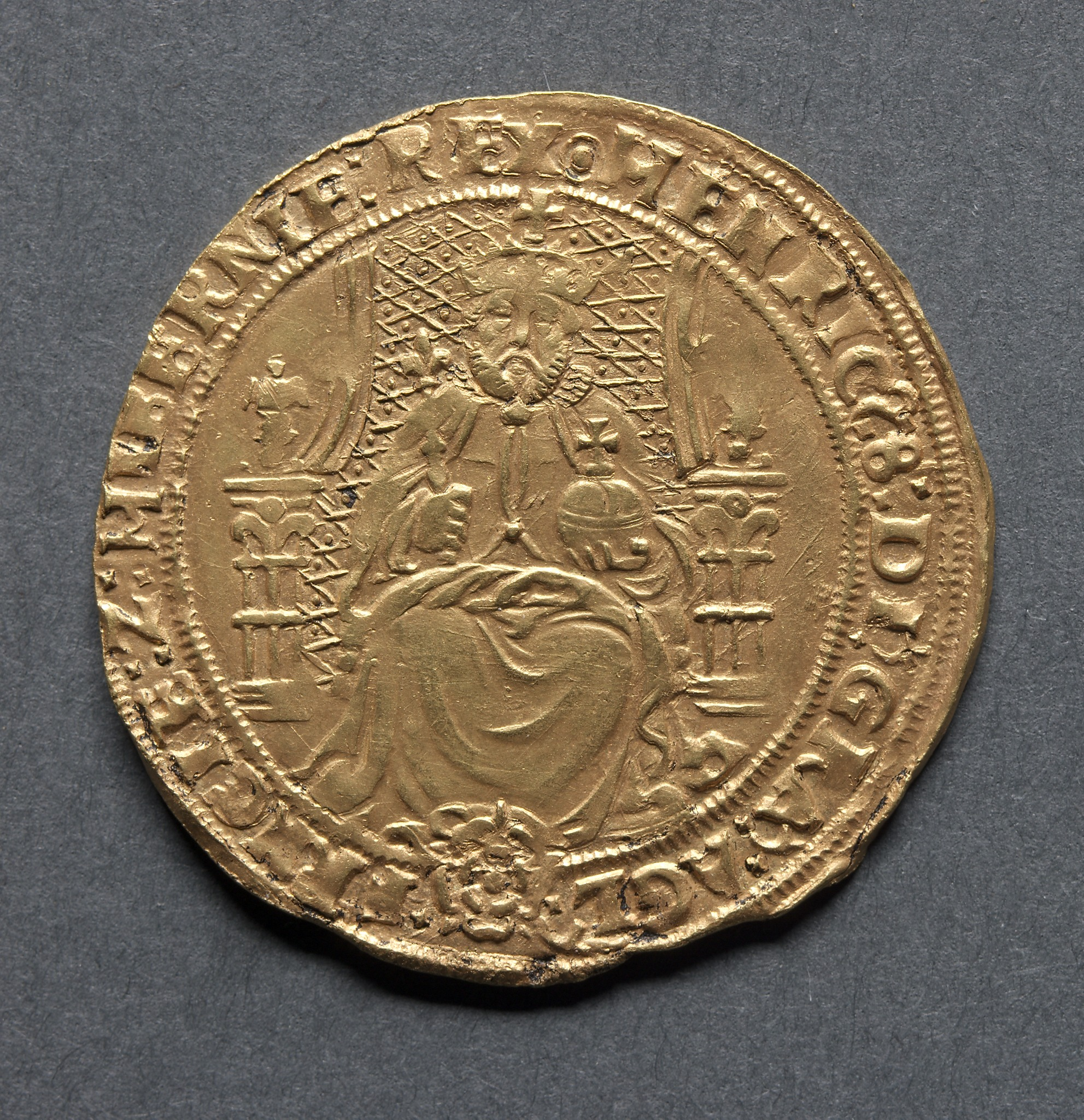
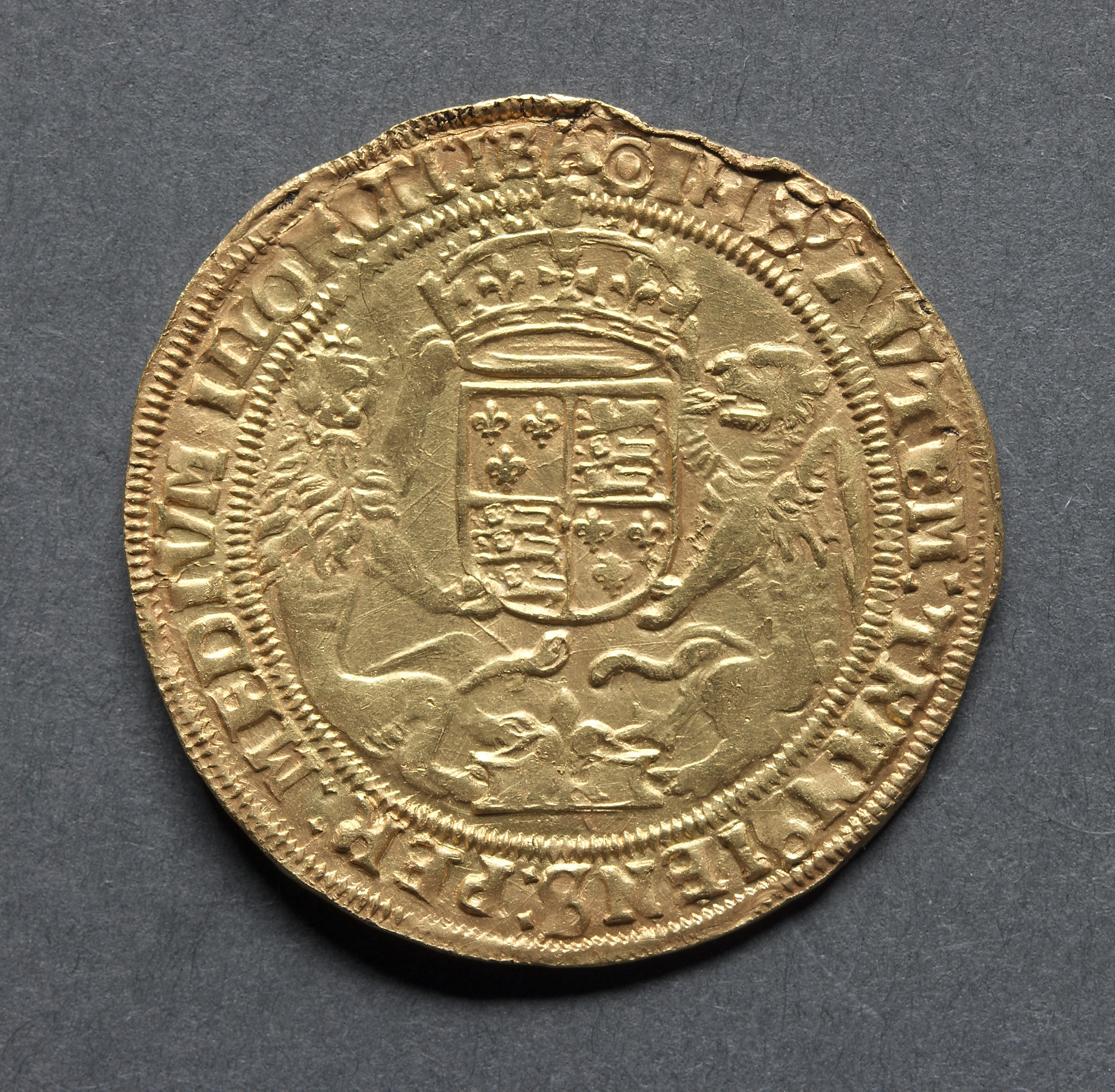
Henry VIII half sovereign

The half sovereign was introduced as part of Henry's third issue of coins, in 1544, debasing the coinage still further. The coin depicts a crowned King Henry sitting in his chair of state, holding his orb and sceptre on the obverse, while the reverse features a royal shield containing the arms of France and England, supported by a lion and a dragon. Henry's titles as king surround the designs on both sides, and HR (Henricus Rex, or Henry the King) appears at the bottom of the reverse design.

The new coin continued to be struck in the reign of Henry's son and successor, Edward VI (r. 1547–1553), initially with the designs of the previous reign, and later with a depiction of Edward seated in the chair of state.

The half sovereign was struck again under James I (r. 1603–1625 in England) beginning in 1603, and features a portrait of the king on the obverse, and a crowned shield on the reverse. The shield of arms featured on James I's coinage features the lions of England in the first quarter, that of Scotland in the second, the harp of Ireland in the third quarter and the fleurs-de-lis of France in the fourth. The legend on the coin proclaims James king of England, Scotland, Ireland and France, while the reverse legend reads "EXVRGAT DEVS DISSIPENTVR INIMICI" which translates as "Let God arise and let His enemies be scattered" from Psalms 68:1. The letters I and R, for IACOBIS REX (James the King) flank the shield. These half sovereigns were only issued in very small numbers. In 1604, James I reduced the weight of gold coinage, and renamed sovereigns and half sovereigns as unites and half unites, in honour of his uniting the two kingdoms on the island of Great Britain. The renamed half sovereign was thereafter replaced by the half guinea.

== British coin (1817 to present) ==
=== Origin ===
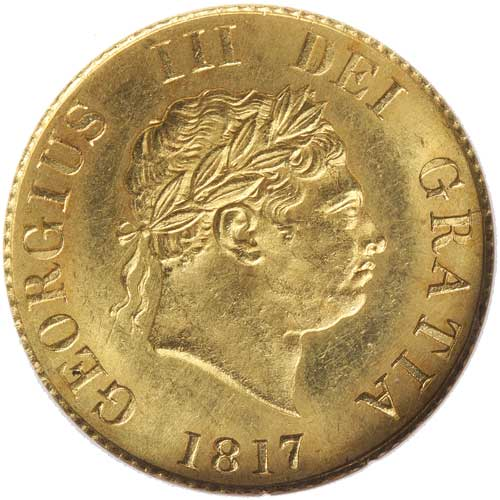
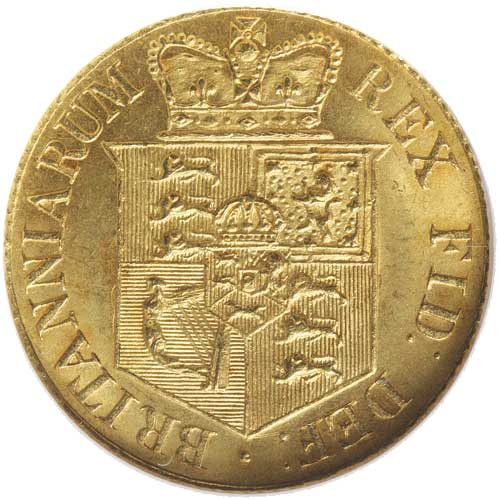
The 1817 George III half sovereign

During the Napoleonic Wars, large amounts of gold left Britain, and worn guineas and bank notes were used for currency. After the final defeat of Napoleon at the Battle of Waterloo (1815), Parliament, by the Coinage Act 1816, placed Britain officially on the gold standard, with the pound to be defined as a given quantity of gold. Almost every speaker in the parliamentary debate supported having a coin valued at twenty shillings, rather than continuing to use the guinea, valued at twenty-one shillings. One reason for the introduction of gold coinage based on the sovereign was that its value, equal to one pound sterling, was more convenient than the guinea. Nevertheless, the Coinage Act did not specify which coins the Mint should strike.

A committee of the Privy Council recommended gold coins of ten shillings, twenty shillings, two pounds and five pounds be issued, and this was accepted by George, Prince Regent on 3 August 1816. The twenty-shilling piece was named a sovereign, with the resurrection of the old name possibly promoted by antiquarians with numismatic interests. The modern sovereign featuring the well-known design by the Italian sculptor, Benedetto Pistrucci, of St George slaying the dragon was proclaimed as currency in 1817, and minting commenced later that year. The new half sovereign instead bore a reverse design depicting a shield, engraved by William Wyon, possibly based on a design by Pistrucci, though the numismatic scholar, Howard Linecar, stated that Wyon was also responsible for the modelling.

The shield was a new version of the royal arms, bearing the quartered arms of England, Scotland and Ireland, with the Hanoverian arms surmounted by a royal crown. The kings of Britain also ruled Hanover between 1714 and 1837; the arms of Hanover depicted the armorial bearings of Brunswick, Lüneburg and Celle. According to the Royal Mint's historian, Kevin Clancy, in his book on the sovereign's history:

a much more traditional fate awaited the first half-sovereigns issued in more than 200 years. All the powers of exuberance had plainly been expended on designing the larger coin and what emerged into circulation in September 1817 was an angular shield of the Royal Arms ... ensuring there was a fractional element to the gold coinage demonstrated forward thinking but, like its higher-value partner, it found the first few years of life beset with troubles.

The half sovereign, proclaimed legal tender on 10 October 1817, became the smallest gold coin in regular use. The first issues of the half sovereign, depicting the bust of George III (r. 1760–1820), were issued dated 1817, 1818 and 1820, with none dated 1819, a year in which few sovereigns were struck. Few gold coins were issued in 1819 because of a proposal that gold should be retained in the Bank of England and only issued in ingots worth £233, a plan which did not succeed.

=== 1820–1837 ===
The first type of half sovereign minted during the reign of George IV (r. 1820–1830) features his portrait engraved by Pistrucci wearing a laurel wreath on the obverse and an ornately garnished crowned shield on the reverse which was designed by Jean Baptiste Merlen. This initial reverse, issued in 1821, was quickly withdrawn due to its similarity in size and appearance to the sixpence, meaning that the sixpence could more easily be gilded and passed off as a half sovereign.

The next time the half sovereign was struck, in 1823, it featured a plainer version of the shield on the reverse, designed by Merlen, and Pistrucci's portrait of George. This version was also struck in 1824 and 1825. The king was dissatisfied with his portrayal, and Pistrucci's bust design was replaced beginning with some 1825 coins with an engraving by Wyon, based on a work by Francis Chantrey. Pistrucci had refused to copy Chantrey's work, and he had no further involvement with designing coinage. Changes were made to the reverse, which was given a more ornate version of the shield, and this was struck every year through 1829. The half sovereigns struck in 1829 were probably dated 1828, but one 1829 half sovereign is known, in the collection of the Ashmolean Museum. This was one of several coins struck by the Royal Mint in 1891 from original dies to supply the Bodleian Library with pieces to fill gaps in its collection. The George and dragon reverse vanished after 1825 from the sovereign, not to be seen again on it until 1871.

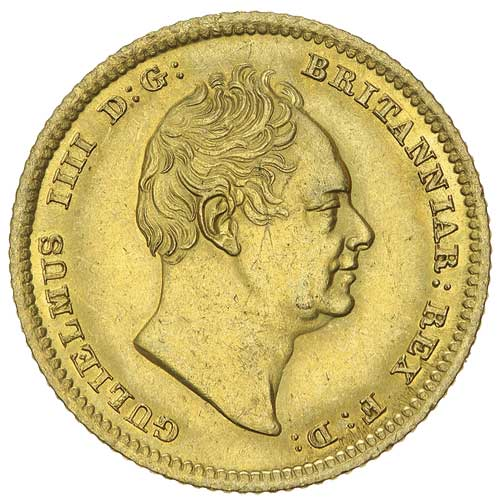
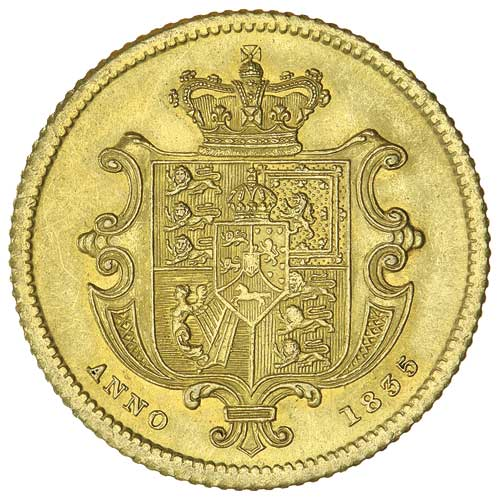
The 1835 half sovereign, depicting William IV

Half sovereigns were not issued for circulation during the reign of William IV (r. 1830–1837) until 1834, though proof coins were issued in 1831. They were issued as well in 1835, 1836 and 1837. The obverse features a barehead bust of William IV, which was engraved by William Wyon from a model by Chantrey. The reverse is similar to the later George IV issues, with a crowned shield and mantle on the reverse which was modelled and engraved by Merlen. The 1834 issue had a reduced diameter, 17.9 mm (most half sovereigns measure 19.4 mm in diameter), though no change was made to the weight or fineness. It is possible that the diameter was reduced so that tools and dies for the Maundy fourpence could be used for the half sovereign. Mint ledgers from this reign record that £60,000 or 120,000 half sovereigns dated 1834 were recalled due to their similarity to the discontinued seven shilling or third guinea pieces. Some 1836 and 1837 half sovereigns are known with a slightly different obverse, apparently taken from the obverse dies for the sixpence. This may have been due to an error by the Royal Mint. It being a common fraud to gild a sixpence to pass it as a half sovereign, beginning in William's reign, the sixpence carried a statement of its value.

=== Victoria (1837–1901) ===
Queen Victoria came to the throne in 1837 and reigned until 1901; the first half sovereigns of her reign were issued in 1838. The first series of Victorian half sovereigns (1838 to 1886) feature William Wyon's portrait of a youthful Victoria on the obverse, and a shield reverse by Merlen with the Hanoverian arms omitted as Victoria, as a woman, could not become the monarch of Hanover. Struck at the Royal Mint in London every year from 1838 to 1885, excepting 1881 and 1882 (the mint was under renovation in the latter year), there are a number of variations over time generally dealing with the size of Victoria's head, the position and size of the legends and date on the coin, and whether a die number (used by the Royal Mint to track die wear) is included on the reverse. Some variations were intentionally introduced by the Royal Mint, according to Sir John Craig in his history of it, "to titillate the numismatists".

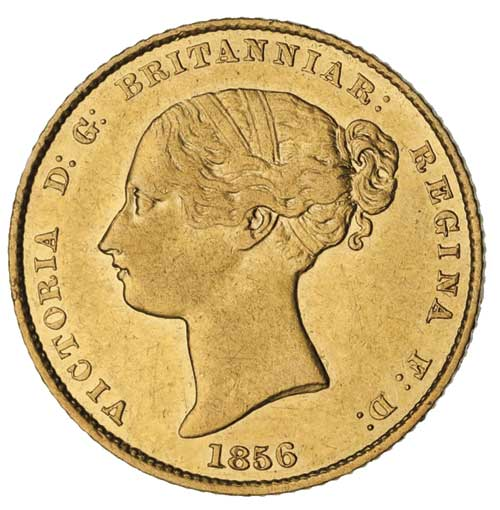
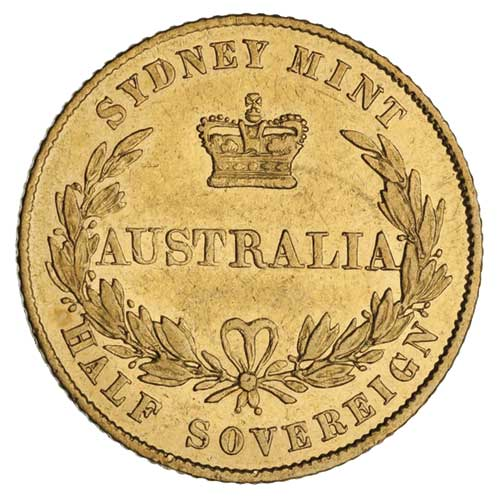
Sydney Mint half sovereign, 1856, depicting Queen Victoria

Gold was discovered in Australia in 1851, leading to requests from colonial officials that a branch of the Royal Mint be established there. After the Sydney Mint opened in 1855, half sovereigns were struck beginning in 1855. Half sovereigns struck at Sydney from 1855 to 1866 were not of the same design as struck in London, but, as the Royal Mint feared that they would not be struck to the same standard, stated their origin at the Sydney Mint as part of the design, and were not legal tender in Britain. Dies for these issues were prepared at London. As trust grew, the Australian coins were accepted as legal tender, and, beginning in 1871, Sydney used the same shield design as did London. The Melbourne Mint opened in 1873, and struck half sovereigns the same year. The Perth Mint opened in 1899, and first struck half sovereigns in 1900. The colonial mints used dies prepared in London and transported by ship, which included mint marks on the reverse for the issues that were otherwise identical to those struck in London: S for Sydney, M for Melbourne and P for Perth. In addition to the series struck whilst a branch of the Royal Mint, the modern Perth Mint has struck half sovereigns (with face value A$15) using the early Australian design, though with an inscription denoting their origin at the Perth Mint.

Despite the fact that the half sovereign saw more use in circulation than the sovereign, in the 1880s, there were efforts to abolish it and replace it with silver coinage. While the sovereign was a world-wide trade coin, the half sovereign stayed mostly in Britain, and had to be struck to exacting standards, which resulted in 45 per cent of newly-struck half sovereigns being melted at the mint. This made it expensive to coin, the more so because the government did not profit from seignorage on gold coinage, as it did on silver coinage, and so the government discouraged the use of the half sovereign. In 1884, the Gladstone government proposed to reduce the gold content of the half sovereign by a tenth; though this effort failed, a later chancellor of the exchequer, Lord Randolph Churchill, described the half sovereign as "that profligate little coin". Nevertheless Charles Fremantle, deputy master of the mint, stated in 1874 that the half sovereign was the most convenient part of the change given for a sovereign.

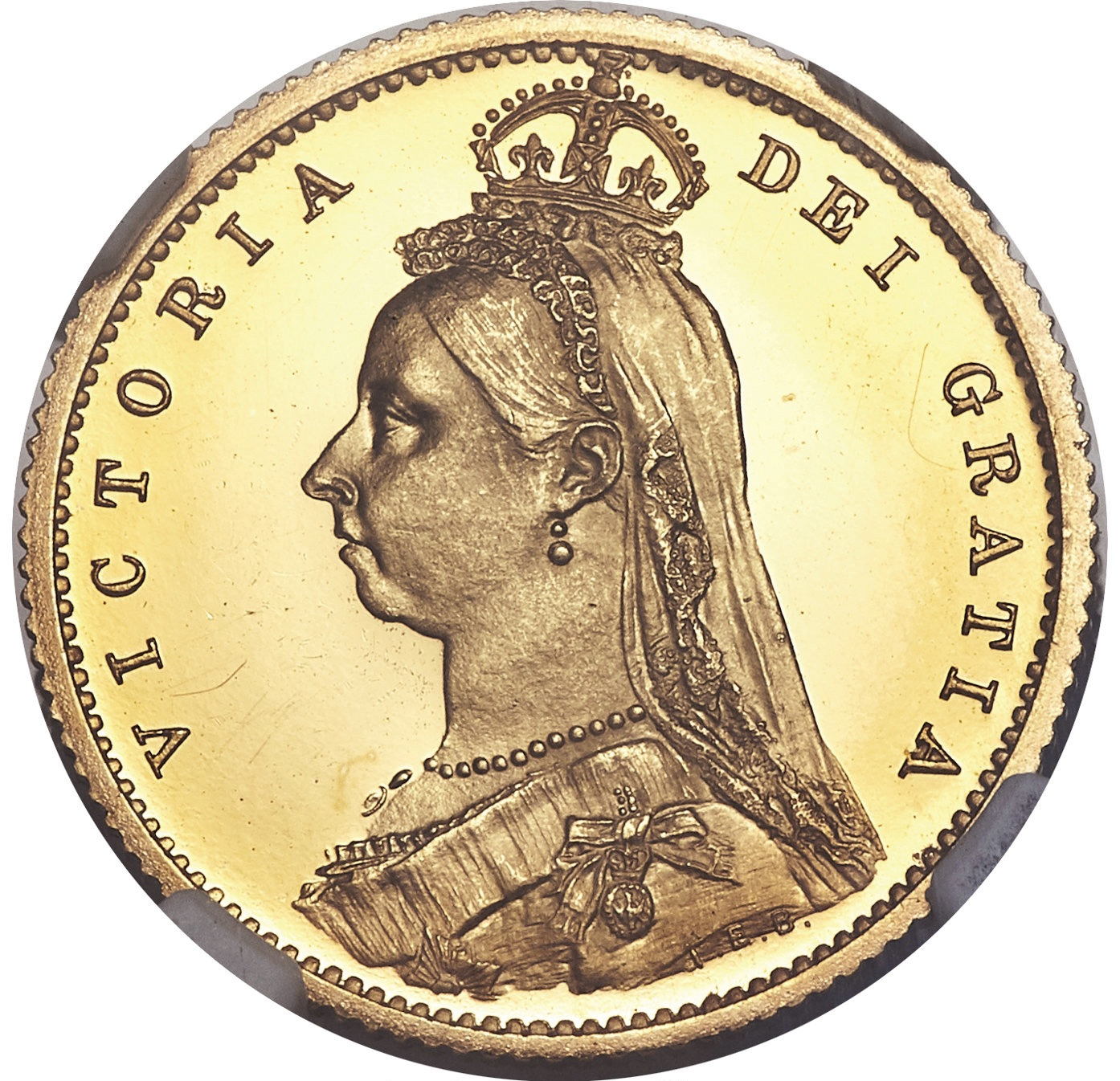
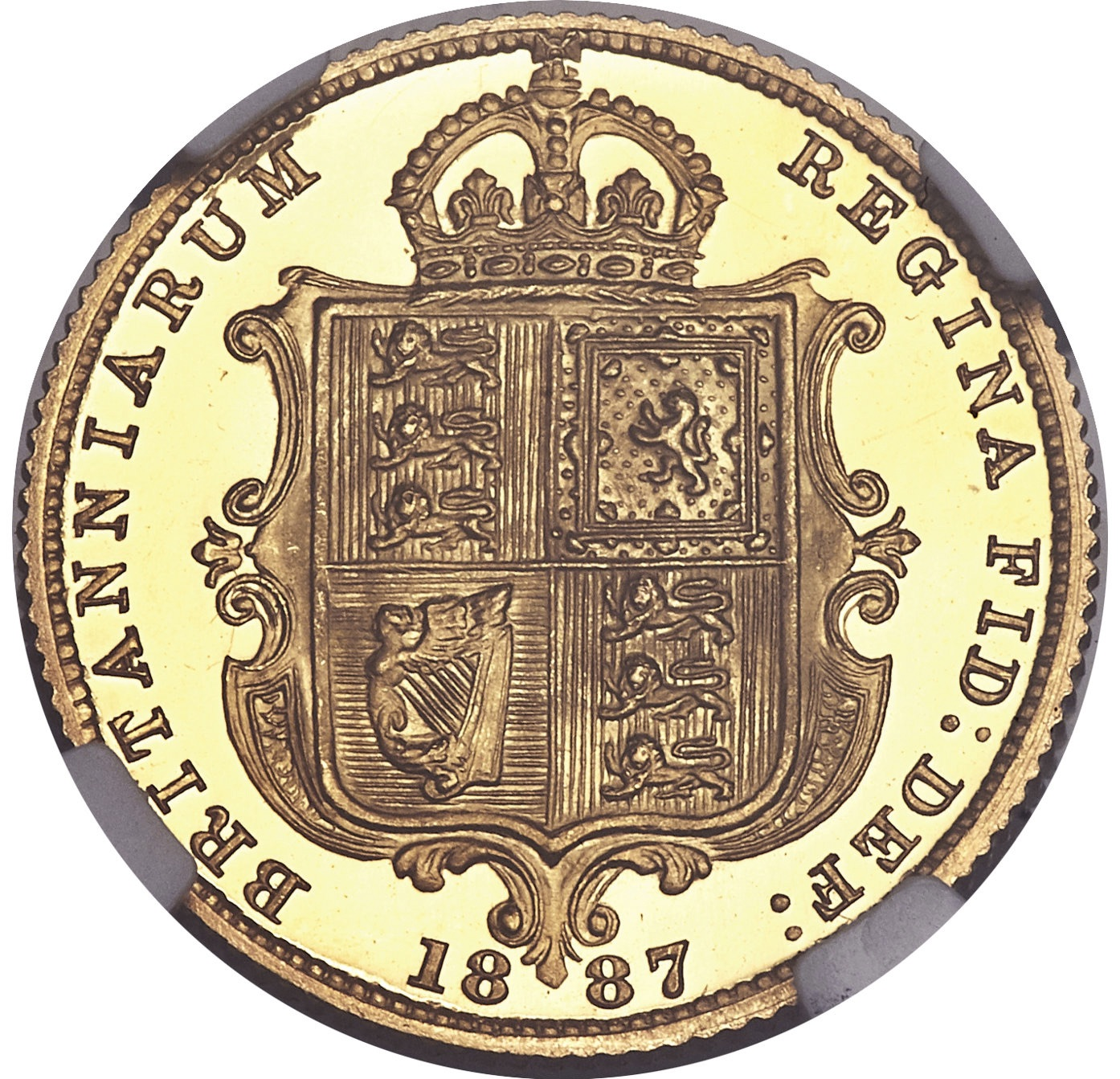
Jubilee coinage half sovereign depicting Victoria, 1887. This series became controversial because Victoria's crown was deemed undersized.

The efforts to use silver in place of gold resulted in the 1887 introduction of the double florin, but that coin lasted only four years. Also in 1887, a new obverse was given to the silver and gold coinage, including the half sovereign. The coins were introduced in the year of Queen Victoria's Golden Jubilee and dubbed the Jubilee coinage; the obverse was designed by Joseph Boehm. The reverse featured another version of the shield (the ensigns armorial of the United Kingdom), this one garnished and surmounted by a crown. The reverse design was engraved by Leonard Charles Wyon. The sixpence of the Jubilee coinage bore no written denomination and was the same size as (and resembled) the half sovereign; amid a flurry of fraud from those who gilded it, the new sixpence had to be withdrawn.

Churchill's successor as chancellor, George Goschen, was slow to decide whether to discontinue the half sovereign, and eventually decided against it. Nevertheless, Goschen was no supporter of the half sovereign, and none were struck at the Royal Mint's facility at Tower Hill between June 1887 and February 1890. No half sovereigns were struck at any mint in 1888, and only Sydney struck them in 1889. In February 1890, Goschen, in his budget statement, took pride in having temporarily curtailed what he described as "the most expensive coin in the world".

Boehm's obverse design showing Victoria wearing a crown that was deemed undersized proved controversial, and the Royal Mint was determined to replace it as soon as possible. An advisory committee on the design of coins was appointed, which recommended using Pistrucci's George and Dragon design for the sovereign on the half sovereign. For the obverse, a new design depicting a veiled bust of Victoria by Thomas Brock was used. First used in 1893, coins bearing it have become known as the Old Head coinage. Pistrucci's initials, BP, are not found on the Old Head half sovereign; Richard Lobel, in Coincraft's Standard Catalogue of English and UK Coins, commented, "how the egotistical Italian, who spelled his name in full on the 1818 crown, would have hated that!" Half sovereigns with Brock's obverse and the Pistrucci reverse continued to be struck until 1901, the year of the queen's death.

=== 1902–1953 ===
The first half sovereigns during Edward VII's reign (r. 1901–1910) were issued in 1902 and the series continued until 1910. The coin features a bare head bust of Edward VII by George William de Saulles on the obverse and the George and dragon reverse. Coins were minted in London, Melbourne, Perth and Sydney. The initial reverse was modified during 1904 to restore Pistrucci's initials to his design and make slight modifications elsewhere. Half sovereigns dated 1904 with the original design were struck at London and Perth; the modified version, with initials, was used at all four mints during that year. Beginning in 1908, the Ottawa branch of the Royal Mint (later the Royal Canadian Mint) struck sovereigns as it was obliged to do on request as a branch of the Royal Mint, mostly for export. Sovereigns and half sovereigns, though legal tender in Canada, did not circulate much. There were no strikings of half sovereigns at Ottawa.

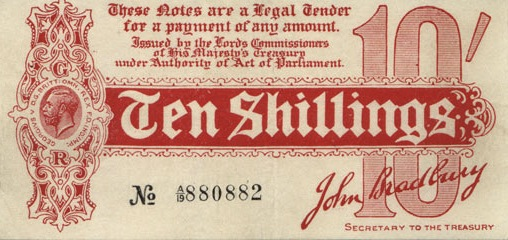
With war beginning in 1914, half sovereigns in British commerce were replaced by treasury notes.

After Edward's death in 1910, half sovereigns featuring the new king, George V (r. 1910–1936), with an obverse designed by Bertram Mackennal and the Pistrucci reverse, were first issued in 1911 and continued until 1915 at London. The final years before the start of the First World War in 1914 saw large circulation of sovereigns and half sovereigns, and during the final days of the July Crisis that led up to war, many members of the public exchanged banknotes for gold. Once war began, paper currency of ten shillings and of one pound were quickly issued to take the place of the two gold coins, and although there was no formal suspension of gold payments, the government promoted the view that to ask for payment in gold was unpatriotic. Nevertheless, production of gold coins at the colonial mints continued, mostly for export. Production of half sovereigns at Australian mints continued until 1920, though only a few were struck after 1916, all at Perth.

The 1918-P half sovereign is unusual because there was no record of half sovereigns being struck in Perth that year, and they were most likely produced in 1919 and 1920, and then exported to an uncertain fate, as relatively few are known. There were coinages at Pretoria (mint mark SA), the only half sovereign issues from there, in 1923, 1925 and 1926. Although the 1923-SA was a proof-only issue, the Pretoria Mint produced the 1925 and 1926 issues for local circulation as mine owners insisted on paying workers in gold. These issues bearing the portrait of George V were the last half sovereigns struck for circulation.

The half sovereign was not included in the sets of pattern coins prepared in 1936 for the reign of Edward VIII (r. 1936–1936), unlike the sovereign, double sovereign and five-pound piece, for which pattern coins exist. Half sovereigns bearing a bare head bust of George VI (r. 1936–1952) by Humphrey Paget on the obverse and the St George reverse, were struck in 1937 with a plain edge as part of the tradition to strike all denominations as part of a proof set in a new monarch's coronation year. They were struck again for that purpose for George's daughter, Elizabeth II (r. 1952–2022), with a portrait by Mary Gillick, in Elizabeth's coronation year of 1953, but these were not for public sale, only for the royal and national collections. Use of Pistrucci's design continued on the reverse.

=== Collector and bullion coin (since 1980) ===
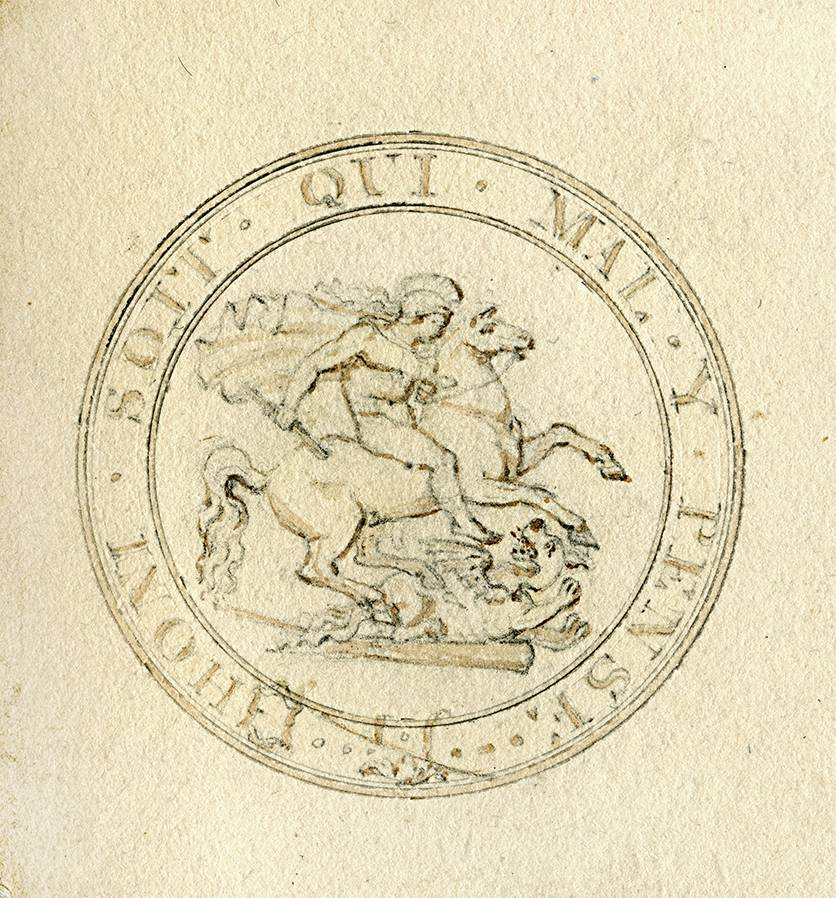
Benedetto Pistrucci's original sketch was the basis of both the 1817 sovereign and the 2017 sovereign series, including the half sovereign.

Although it no longer circulated, the sovereign had been issued as a bullion coin beginning in 1957, and with special-quality proof coins issued from 1979. The Royal Mint realised there was a market for sovereign coins and began to sell them to collectors at well over face or bullion value. In 1980, the first Elizabeth II half sovereigns available to the public were issued, in proof quality, and in 1982, the first half sovereigns sold as bullion coins. Both issues carried the second coinage portrait of Elizabeth II, by Arnold Machin on their obverses, with the Pistrucci design as the reverse. Proof half sovereigns with the Machin obverse were also struck dated 1983 and 1984.

From 1985 to 1997, except in 1989, half sovereigns in proof condition with the third coinage portrait of Elizabeth, by Raphael Maklouf, were struck. Many of these were issued in four-piece gold proof sets with the sovereign, double sovereign and five-pound piece. In 1989, a special design by Bernard Sindall for the 500th anniversary of the sovereign coin was struck in all four denominations. Sindall adapted a design showing an enthroned Queen Elizabeth II that he had originally proposed for the Silver Jubilee crown of 1977 for the obverse, and placed a crowned shield atop a double rose for the reverse.

The fourth coinage portrait of Elizabeth, by Ian Rank-Broadley, appeared on half sovereigns from 1998 to 2015. The coins were initially only in proof, but from 2000, were also made available as bullion coins. Special designs for the reverse were substituted for Pistrucci's for Elizabeth II's Golden Jubilee in 2002 (by Timothy Noad, depicting a crowned shield within a wreath), in 2005 (a more modern interpretation of the George and dragon, also by Noad), and in 2012 for Elizabeth II's Diamond Jubilee (another modern interpretation of the George and dragon, by Paul Day). In 2009, in conjunction with an attempt to restore Pistrucci's design for the sovereign as closely as possible to what he originally intended, the half sovereign was modified to resemble what it had looked like when the George and dragon was first placed on the coin in 1893. This entailed the loss of Pistrucci's initials, which remained absent in 2010 but were restored in 2011. Sovereigns which are legal tender in Britain were produced in India with the permission of the Royal Mint from 2013 with mint mark I; half sovereigns were struck there in 2014.

Beginning with some proof 2015 issues, and continuing with bullion issues in 2016, the fifth coinage portrait of Elizabeth II, by Jody Clark was substituted on the half sovereign's obverse. Proof half sovereigns dated 2016 featured an obverse with a different portrait of Queen Elizabeth by James Butler in honour of the queen's 90th birthday. For the 200th anniversary of the modern sovereign in 2017, proof half sovereigns featured a design evocative of the 1817 sovereign, with Pistrucci's design contained within a Garter, and bullion issues bore a privy mark with the number 200 marking the anniversary.

In 2022, the Royal Mint struck half sovereigns with a reverse design by Noad showing an interpretation of the Royal Arms. This design, used for the sovereign and its multiples and fractions, was to mark the Platinum Jubilee of Elizabeth II. Later in the year, following the death of Elizabeth II, the Royal Mint issued memorial coins in the sovereign range, including the half sovereign, featuring an interpretation of the Royal Arms by Clark as the reverse, and for the obverse, the first coinage portrait of Elizabeth's successor, Charles III (r. 2022– ), by Martin Jennings. Half sovereigns were issued in 2023, marking the coronation of Charles III, with a crowned bust of the king by Jennings on the obverse and with the Pistrucci design on the reverse. For 2024, Jennings' uncrowned portrait of Charles was paired with Pistrucci's reverse on each of the five sovereign denominations struck in proof, from the quarter sovereign to the five-pound piece. For 2025, Pistrucci's reverse was used on some coins, with others featuring Jean Baptiste Merlen's Royal Arms reverse, first used on the sovereign in 1825, for its 200th anniversary. For 2026, the sovereign range returned to yellow-coloured gold from rose and added security features amid strong demand and price rises for gold.

== See also ==
- Quarter sovereign
- Double sovereign

== Bibliography ==
- Bull, Maurice (2023). English Gold Coinage. Vol. II. London: Spink & Son Ltd. ISBN 978-1-912667-72-7.
- Celtel, André; Gullbekk, Svein H. (2006). The Sovereign and its Golden Antecedents. Oslo, Norway: Monetarius. ISBN 978-82-996755-6-7.
- Churchill, Winston (1906). Lord Randolph Churchill. Vol. II. London: Macmillan & Co. OCLC 59397927.
- Clancy, Kevin (2017) [2015]. A History of the Sovereign: Chief Coin of the World (2nd ed.). Llantrisant, Wales: Royal Mint Museum. ISBN 978-1-869917-00-5.
- Craig, John (2010) [1953]. The Mint (paperback ed.). Cambridge, United Kingdom: Cambridge University Press. ISBN 978-0-521-17077-2.
- Cross, W.K., ed. (2008). Charlton Standard Catalogue of Canadian Coins (62nd ed.). Toronto, Ontario, Canada: The Charlton Press. ISBN 978-0-88968-328-0.
- Dyer, G. P. (1995). "Gold, Silver and the Double Florin" (PDF). British Numismatic Journal. 64: 114–125.
- Lant, Jeffrey L. (1973). "The Jubilee Coinage of 1887" (PDF). British Numismatic Journal. 43: 132–141.
- Linecar, Howard W.A. (1977). British Coin Designs and Designers. London: G. Bell & Sons Ltd. ISBN 978-0-7135-1931-0.
- Lobel, Richard, ed. (1999) [1995]. Coincraft's Standard Catalogue English & UK Coins 1066 to Date (5th ed.). London: Standard Catalogue Publishers Ltd. ISBN 978-0-9526228-8-8.
- Marsh, Michael A. (1982). The Gold Half Sovereign. Cambridge, UK: Cambridge Coins. ISBN 978-0-9506929-1-3.
- Marsh, Michael A. (2017) [1980]. The Gold Sovereign (revised ed.). Exeter, Devon: Token Publishing Ltd. ISBN 978-1-908828-36-1.
- Seaby, Peter (1985). The Story of British Coinage. London: B. A. Seaby Ltd. ISBN 978-0-900652-74-5.
- Spink & Son Ltd (2004). Coins of England and the United Kingdom (39th ed.). London: Spink & Son Ltd. ISBN 978-1-902040-56-1.
- Stocker, Mark (1996). "The Coinage of 1893" (PDF). British Numismatic Journal. 66: 67–86.
- Whittington, Bob (2017). Money Talks: British Monarchs and History in Coins (Kindle ed.). Dunbeath, Caithness, Scotland: Whittles Publishing. ISBN 978-1-84995-356-6.
