= Old Head coinage =

1893–1901 British coins

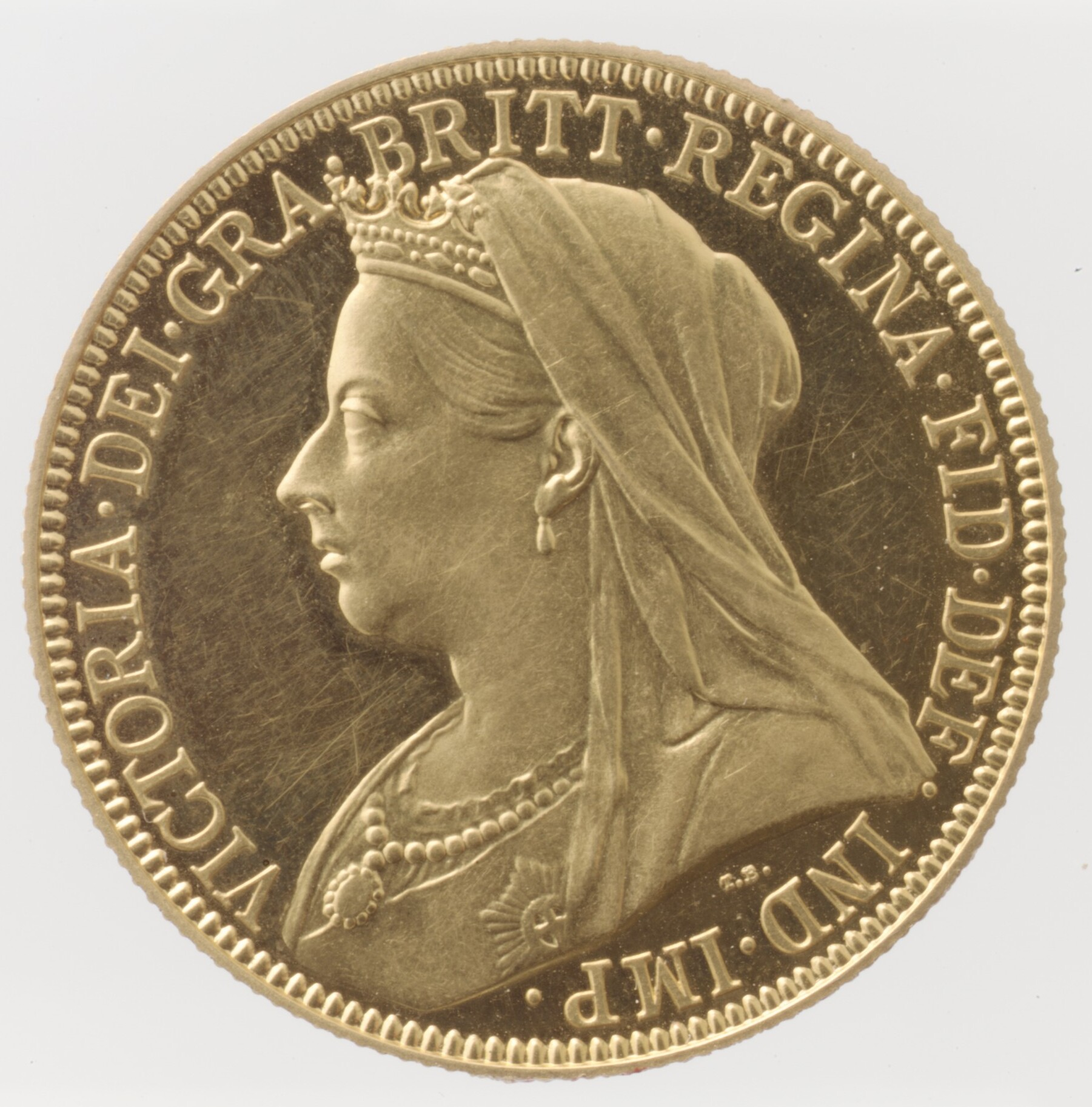
The Old Head coinage obverse (1893 double sovereign shown)

The Old Head coinage or Veiled Head coinage were British coins struck and dated between 1893 and 1901, which featured on the obverse a portrait by Thomas Brock of an aged Queen Victoria wearing a diadem partially hidden by a widow's veil. It replaced the Jubilee coinage, struck since 1887, which had been widely criticised both for the portrait of the Queen, and because the reverses of most of the coins did not state their monetary values. Some denominations continued with their old reverse designs, with Benedetto Pistrucci's design for the sovereign extended to the half sovereign. New designs for some of the silver coinage were inaugurated, created either by Brock or by Edward Poynter, and all denominations less than the crown, or five-shilling piece, stated their values.

As early as 1888, consideration had been given to replacing the Jubilee coinage with a new design, but officials preferred to wait. The designer of the Jubilee coins' obverse, Sir Joseph Boehm, died in 1890, and soon thereafter, the Chancellor of the Exchequer, George Goschen, appointed a Committee on the Design of Coins to consider the matter. That committee reported in 1892, proposing new reverse designs for some denominations, whilst other coins' reverses were to remain the same. Some alterations had to be made after the report, but the new coins were issued in early 1893 to generally positive reviews.

The Old Head coinage became the first to bear, as part of the monarch's royal titles, IND IMP (Indiae Imperatrix), the Latin for Empress of India. Although Victoria was not authorised to use this title in the United Kingdom, the Prime Minister, Lord Salisbury, and his cabinet had approved its use on the coinage in 1892 because the coins also circulated in the colonies. The Old Head coinage originally consisted only of gold and silver coins, but in 1895, the Brock head of Victoria was placed on the bronze coinage (the penny and its fractions) as well. They continued to be struck until the death of Victoria in 1901 necessitated a change of design for the obverse; beginning in 1902, the coinage bore the head of her successor, Edward VII.

== Background ==
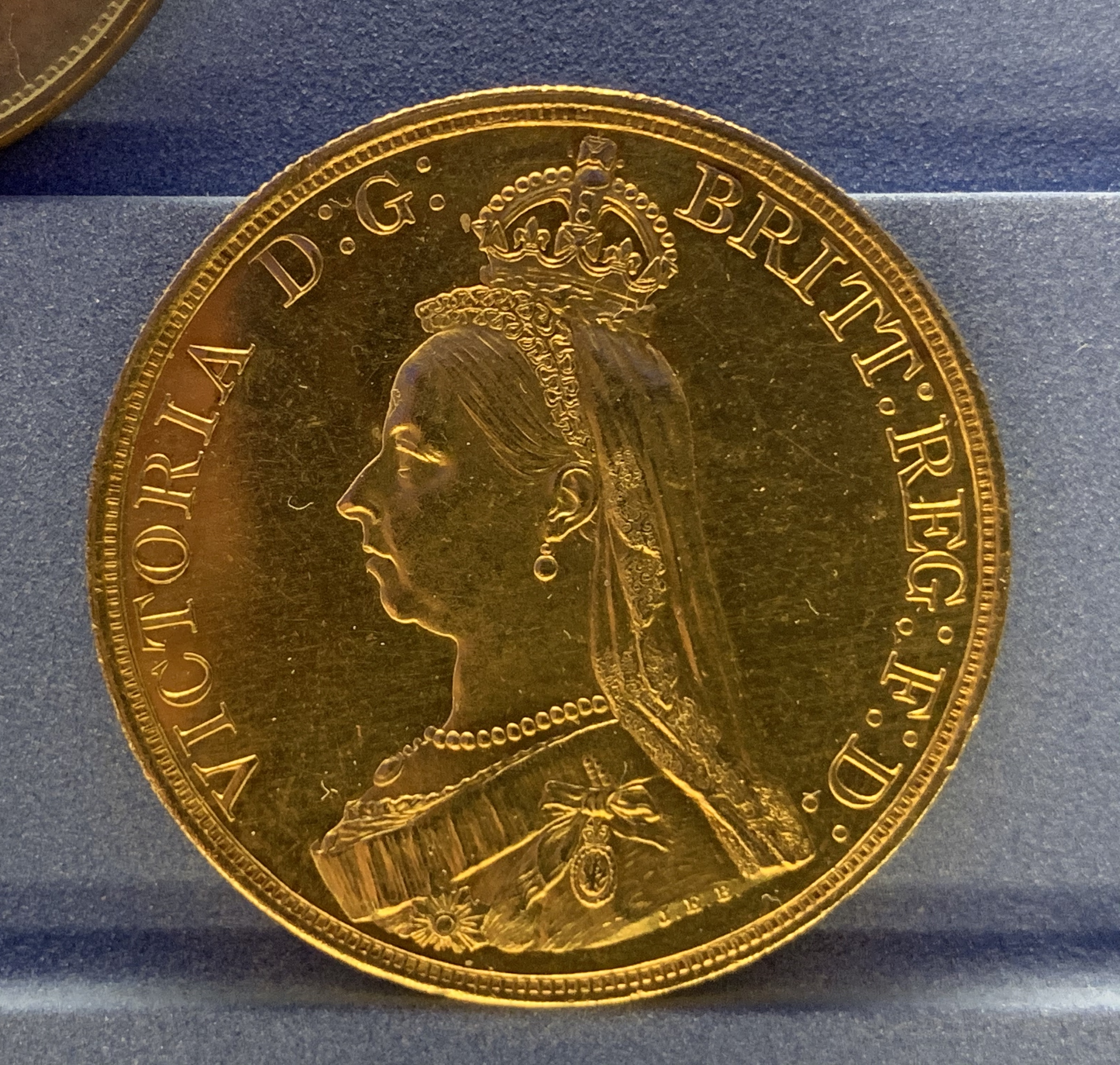
Gold coin of the Jubilee coinage

A new obverse design for British gold and silver coins was introduced in June 1887, designed by Joseph Boehm. This coincided with Queen Victoria's Golden Jubilee, and the new issue became known as the Jubilee coinage. New reverse designs by Leonard Charles Wyon were introduced at the same time for the silver coins between the sixpence and half crown, and a new coin, the double florin or four-shilling piece, was introduced. The crown, or five-shilling piece, was struck for circulation for the first time since the 1840s.

On Boehm's design, Victoria wears a small crown, the Small Diamond Crown, on her head. This was the crown she preferred to wear at the time, due to its light weight, but the design was criticised for making it appear that the crown was about to fall off. Furthermore, none of the new silver coin designs bore a statement of the coin's value. The sixpence, which was the same size as the gold half sovereign, was immediately gilded by fraudsters to make it appear to be the more valuable coin, and the Royal Mint hastily stopped production, returning to the previous reverse design, which included a statement of the coin's value.

The Royal Mint was anxious to change Boehm's design for another as soon as a decent interval had passed. As early as 1888, Victoria was shown a pattern coin with a proposed new design; Mark Stocker, in his article on the 1893 coinage, suggests the lack of further documentation on the new design meant that royal approval to proceed was not forthcoming. In September 1889, the Chancellor of the Exchequer, George Goschen, wrote to Victoria, "as the general discussion on the Jubilee coinage had subsided, and the public appeared to have got used to the new coin, I thought that it might possibly be best to let the matter rest for a while". She responded, "the Queen dislikes the new coinage very much, and wishes the old one could still be used and the new one gradually disused, and then a new one struck." Goschen was dubious that this could be done, but promised, "I will confer with the Mint authorities whether if we cannot go back we should not go forward with the fresh design."

== Preparation ==
Goschen chose to proceed by appointing an advisory commission, the Committee on the Design of Coins, in February 1891, with a brief "to examine the designs on the various coins put into circulation in the year 1887, and the improvements in those designs since suggested, and to make such recommendations on the subject as might seem desirable, and to report what coins, if any, should have values expressed on them in words and figures". The committee was chaired by the Liberal MP, Sir John Lubbock, and the other members were David Powell, Deputy Governor of the Bank of England; Richard Blaney Wade, Chairman of the National Provincial Bank; Sir Frederic Leighton, President of the Royal Academy; Sir John Evans, President of the British Numismatic Society; and Sir Charles Fremantle, Deputy Master of the Royal Mint.

At its first meeting, on 12 February 1891, the committee recommended that the double florin not be further struck. They felt that as the five-shilling piece would continue to be coined, two large silver pieces were unnecessary. The government agreed with the recommendation—minting of the double florin had been suspended in August 1890. At its second meeting, on 27 February, the committee considered an open competition for new coinage designs, but instead decided to invite several artists (all Royal Academicians or associate members of the academy) to submit proposals. The invited artists were asked to submit two portraits of Victoria, both left-facing, since the Royal Mint was contemplating not using the same portrait on the florin and half crown to avoid confusion between the denominations, which were close in size and value. Entrants were offered £150 for their labours, an amount the Illustrated London News considered inadequate, and two artists declined the invitation.

The competition had a deadline of 31 October 1891, and on 27 November, the committee met at the Bank of England to consider the submissions. The obverse designs submitted by the sculptor, Sir Thomas Brock, were selected. The committee decided to retain Benedetto Pistrucci's 1817 Saint George and the Dragon design on the crown, sovereign, double sovereign, and five-pound piece, and extended it to the half sovereign. For the sixpence and half crown, designs by Brock were selected, though he had intended them for the shilling and florin. For those coins, designs by Edward John Poynter were selected. The committee's decision-making process is unclear, though Goschen later stated that Leighton's influence had predominated.

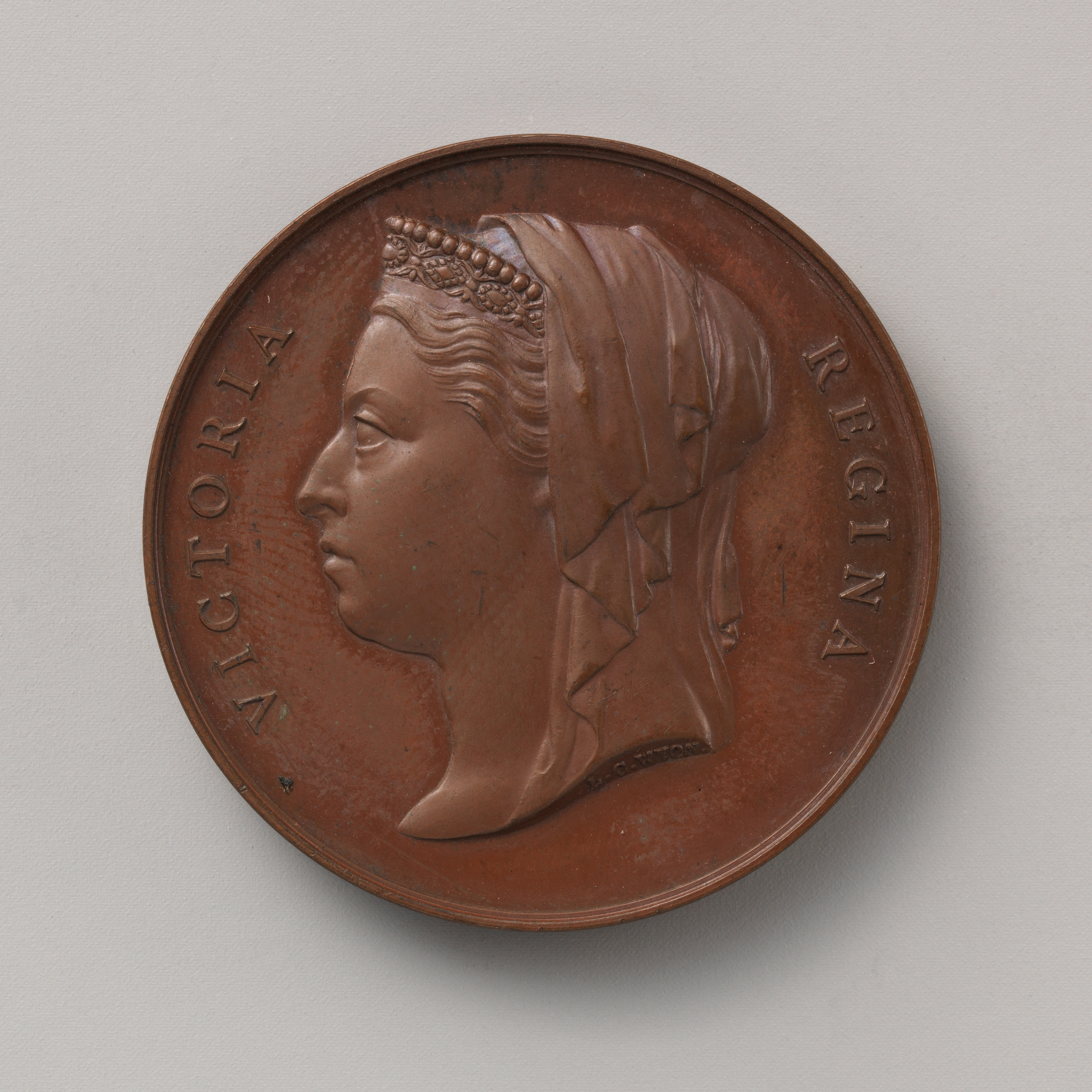
The Ashanti or "Ashantee" Medal (1874)

At the committee's next meeting on 23 December 1891, it was decided to ask Brock to alter his first obverse in imitation of the Ashanti medal of 1874. According to Stocker, "In short, the Ashanti Medal was fused with Brock's pre-existing design to create the 'Old Head'." Little change was required of his second obverse. Both sculptors were required to make slight changes to their reverse designs, which they did in time for the reverses to be approved at the final committee meeting on 11 March 1892. The committee recommended that a second portrait of Victoria be used only on the florin. When this was objected to by Victoria, who thought it unlikely that anyone would distinguish the two denominations in that manner, the committee revised its report. The new florin was made slightly smaller in diameter, the third time its size had been changed since its introduction in 1849.

The sculptors had been directed to include Victoria's name and titles on their designs, rendered as the Latin "Victoria Dei Gratia Regina Britanniarum Fidei Defensor" ("Victoria, by the Grace of God, Queen of the British Realms, Defender of the Faith"), to be abbreviated as necessary. Victoria had been lobbying since 1888 for her title as empress of India, granted by the Royal Titles Act 1876, to be included on the coinage, and on 12 February 1892, the Prime Minister, Lord Salisbury, wrote to her, "Your Majesty's Servants are of opinion that the title of Empress of India, indicating, as it does, Your Majesty's relation to far the larger portion of Your subjects, ought to appear on the coin, in the shape of the letters 'Ind Imp' or 'I.I.' or some such abbreviation." Although the Royal Titles Act forbade the monarch to use that title on matters exclusively within the United Kingdom, the cabinet determined that the wording could be included as the coins would also circulate in the colonies.

On 12 March 1892, the designs were sent to Sir Henry Ponsonby, the Queen's private secretary. The Queen generally liked the "Old Head" obverse, though she disliked Brock's second obverse, which was thereafter dropped. She disliked Brock's reverse for the half crown and Poynter's for the shilling. The two sculptors prepared new versions, though Poynter wanted extra pay, which he did not get. It was unclear who would engrave the designs into steel dies, as Leonard Wyon, the engraver to the Royal Mint, had died in 1891, leaving no clear successor. Brock eventually suggested George William De Saulles, a Birmingham-born engraver who had worked in London for John Pinches (Medallists) Ltd, but had since returned to his native city to work for the medallist, Joseph Moore.

Victoria had not sat for Brock; the sculptor worked from photographs of her, of which he had several. His original version was in wax, from which a plaster cast was made. Once the committee had approved his work, he made a new cast, working to make the coin of low relief, suitable for coining. De Saulles used a reducing lathe to make coin-size hubs, from which coinage dies could be made. This process left a number of small lines on the steel of the hubs; these were removed by De Saulles under Brock's supervision. Poynter similarly supervised the process for the reverses he had designed. De Saulles was responsible for much of the work involving the profile and lettering on the obverses of the coins.

== Design ==
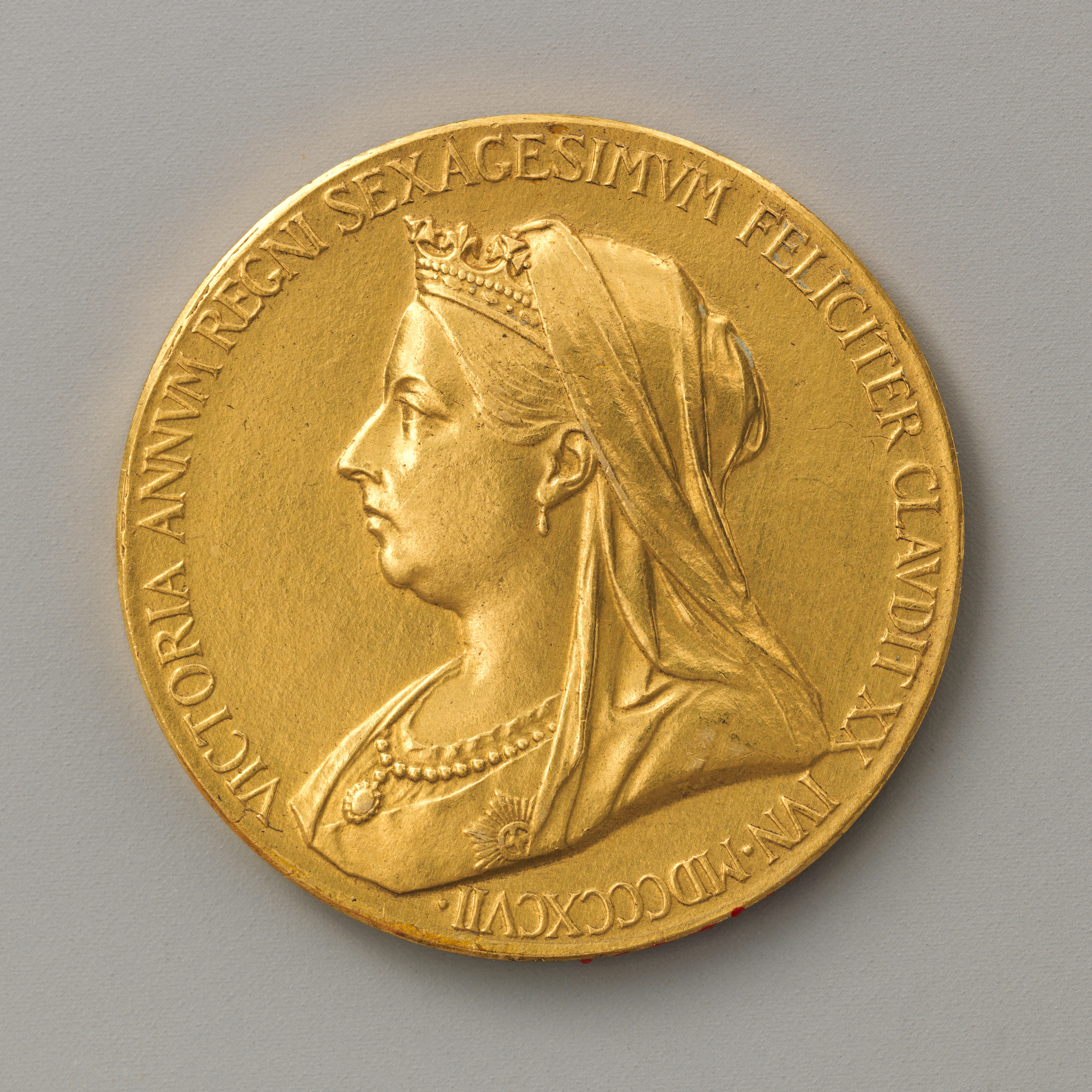
Brock's medal for Victoria's Diamond Jubilee (1897)

Brock's design for the obverse features a left-facing bust of Victoria, with the features of an older woman. She wears a diadem, partially obscured by a veil that hangs down behind the ear. Her straight hair is swept up from the temple, above the visible ear, from which dangles a single-drop earring. She wears a frill-necked bodice, with a mantle over it, and also a necklace with pendant. On the mantle, facing the viewer, is the Star of the Garter, with its outer portion partially obscured by the veil. The designer's initials, TB, are under the bust's truncation, on most denominations near the D in IND.

Except for the half crown, the coins bear on the obverse the legend VICTORIA DEI GRA BRITT REGINA FID DEF IND IMP. On the half crown, the Latin legend is divided VICTORIA DEI GRA BRITT REG on the obverse, with FID DEF IND IMP on the reverse. The IND IMP was new to British coinage, but Victoria had sought its inclusion as early as 1888. Balked then, she was successful with the introduction of the Old Head coinage five years later. "Britanniarum", meaning "the Britains", was abbreviated as BRITT, through the intervention of William Gladstone. A Latin scholar as well as a politician, Gladstone had invoked the rule that an abbreviation of a plural noun in Latin is to be rendered with a doubled final consonant.

The motto DECUS ET TUTAMEN ("an ornament and a safeguard") was added to the edge of the crown, as well as the regnal year in Roman numerals: thus some 1893 crowns render this as LVI (the 56th year of Victoria's reign) and some as LVII, with the pattern continuing until 1900 (the last year of Victoria's reign in which crowns were struck). Crowns with DECUS ET TUTAMEN on them with the regnal year were first struck during the reign of Charles II. At that time, the edge legend had the practical purpose of deterring the illicit clipping of coins to remove metal. The wording, DECUS ET TUTAMEN, was said to have been suggested by a Mr Evelyn based on a vignette of Cardinal de Richelieu's Greek Testament.

The gold coinage bore Pistrucci's Saint George and the Dragon design. The plume on the saint's helmet, which had featured in Pistrucci's original design for the five-pound and two-pound pieces before later being removed and then restored in 1887, was redesigned. The half sovereign, though it bears Pistrucci's design, does not bear his initials; the numismatist, Richard Lobel, commented, "how the egotistical Italian, who spelt his name in full on the 1818 crown, would have hated that!" The Australian branch mints at Sydney and Melbourne would issue gold sovereigns of the United Kingdom type with Brock's portrait from 1893 to 1901, with the new branch mint at Perth issuing similar coins from 1899 to 1901. Half sovereigns from the Australian mints were also issued, though not in all years

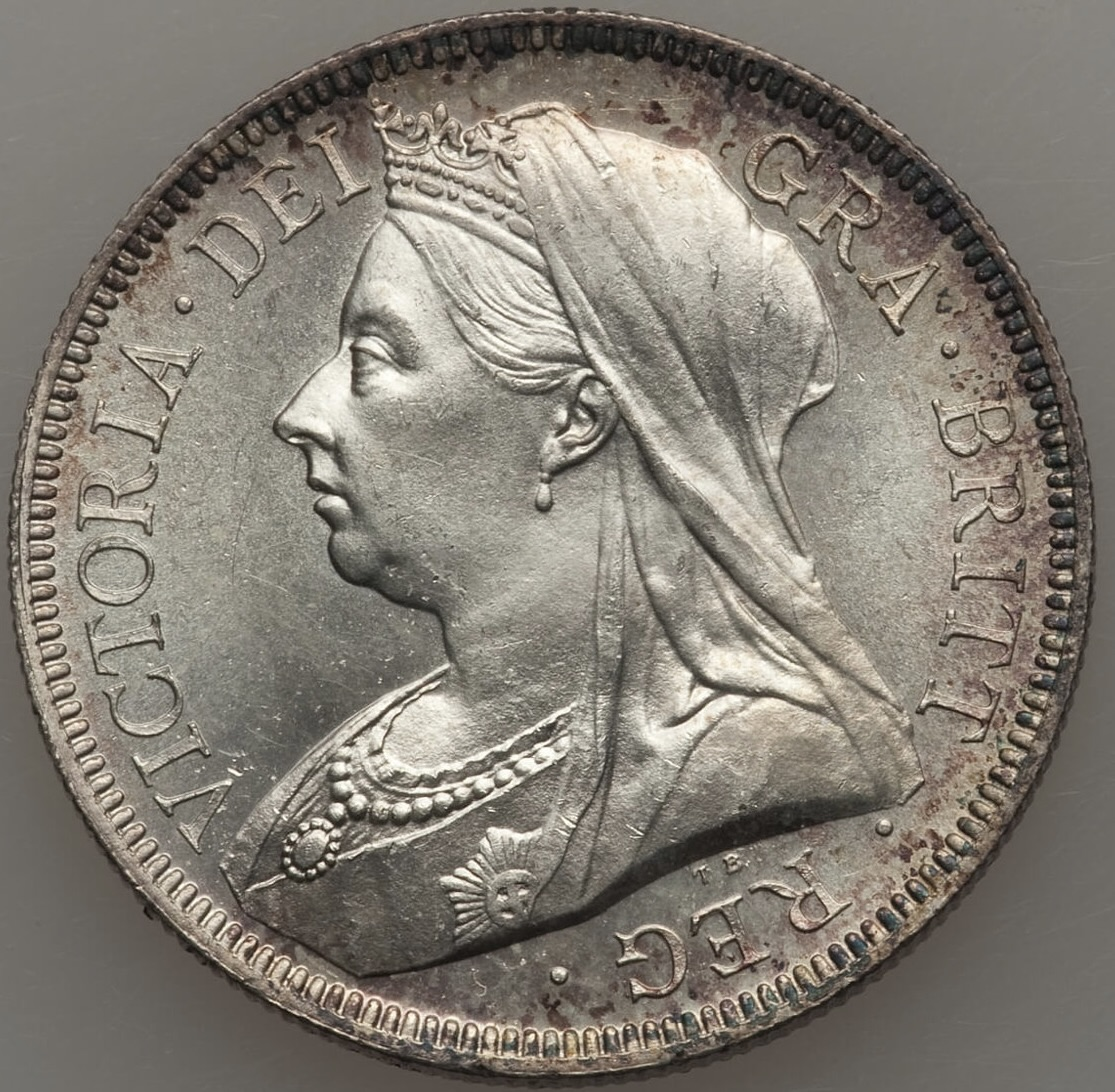
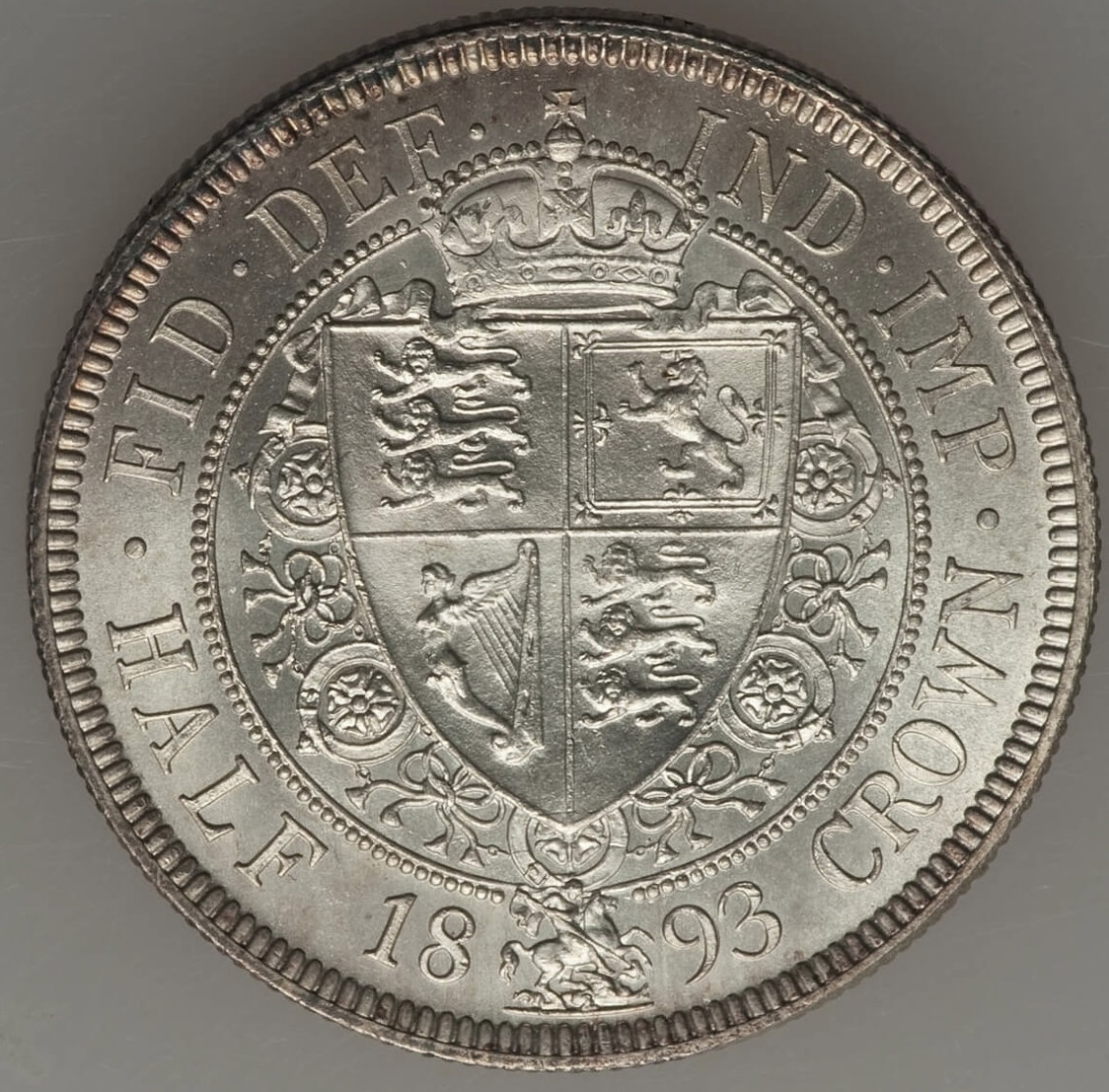
Brock's and Poynter's half crown, the only Old Head coin to bear part of Victoria's titles on the reverse.

The half crown, the first coin of that value to proclaim its value on its face, depicts a shield within the collar of the Order of the Garter. Poynter's design for the shilling and florin show shields with the arms of England, Scotland and Ireland on separate shields, with the whole surrounded by a Garter. The shilling had seen its value engraved on its face from 1831 until the Jubilee redesign; the words ONE SHILLING were restored to it. The sixpence and threepence would continue to bear their previous designs; all denominations less than the crown would now bear a statement of value. On the penny and its fractions, the figure of Britannia from previous issues was made more erect and alert, and the sailing ship and lighthouse seen on either side of her were omitted; the lighthouse would be restored in 1937.

Sir John Craig, in his history of the Royal Mint, considered Brock's efforts "the least unsuccessful" of the submitted designs. Peter Seaby, in his history of British coinage, deemed the depiction "a new and improved portrait of the queen", with a larger portrait than on the Jubilee coinage. Leonard Forrer, in his 1916 Biographical Dictionary of Medallists, deemed the obverse "a splendid portrait of the Queen by that scholarly sculptor, Sir Thomas Brock", though he characterised Poynter's reverses as "not very satisfactory".

== Circulation ==
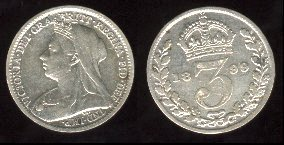
No change was made to the reverse design of the threepence

On 30 January 1893, the date of the proclamation declaring the new coins current, Fremantle displayed the new coins for the press at the Royal Mint, getting a reaction far more positive than the Jubilee coinage had six years previously. The Birmingham Daily Post reported that "the result is a distinct success [...] Her Majesty's features have a most pleasing expression". The Pall Mall Gazette noted that, "it would be damning them with faint praise merely to say that they are of superior appearance to the Jubilee issue", and that though the use of the power to include the Empress of India title was belated, it was unquestionably valid, since British coins were legal tender in the colonies.

The Lancaster Gazetter wrote on 8 February, "The new coinage starts at a great advantage, for it supplants some of the most unfortunate designs that the Mint has ever put in circulation. In a few days' time it will be in everybody's hands." The Daily News wrote:

The new coinage is an immense improvement upon its predecessor. A Greek artist would have given his approval to Mr. Brock's design of the Queen's head. In place of that ridiculous topknot toy crown of the Jubilee period, Mr. Brock puts a simple, perfectly becoming tiara, over the back part of which and down to the shoulders droops a veil in light, graceful folds. There, at last, is something you can look at without laughing. The portrait is excellent. As for the tiara, it is the ornament which her Majesty habitually wears on State occasions. It is the ornament she would wear this 31st of January if she were opening Parliament in person.

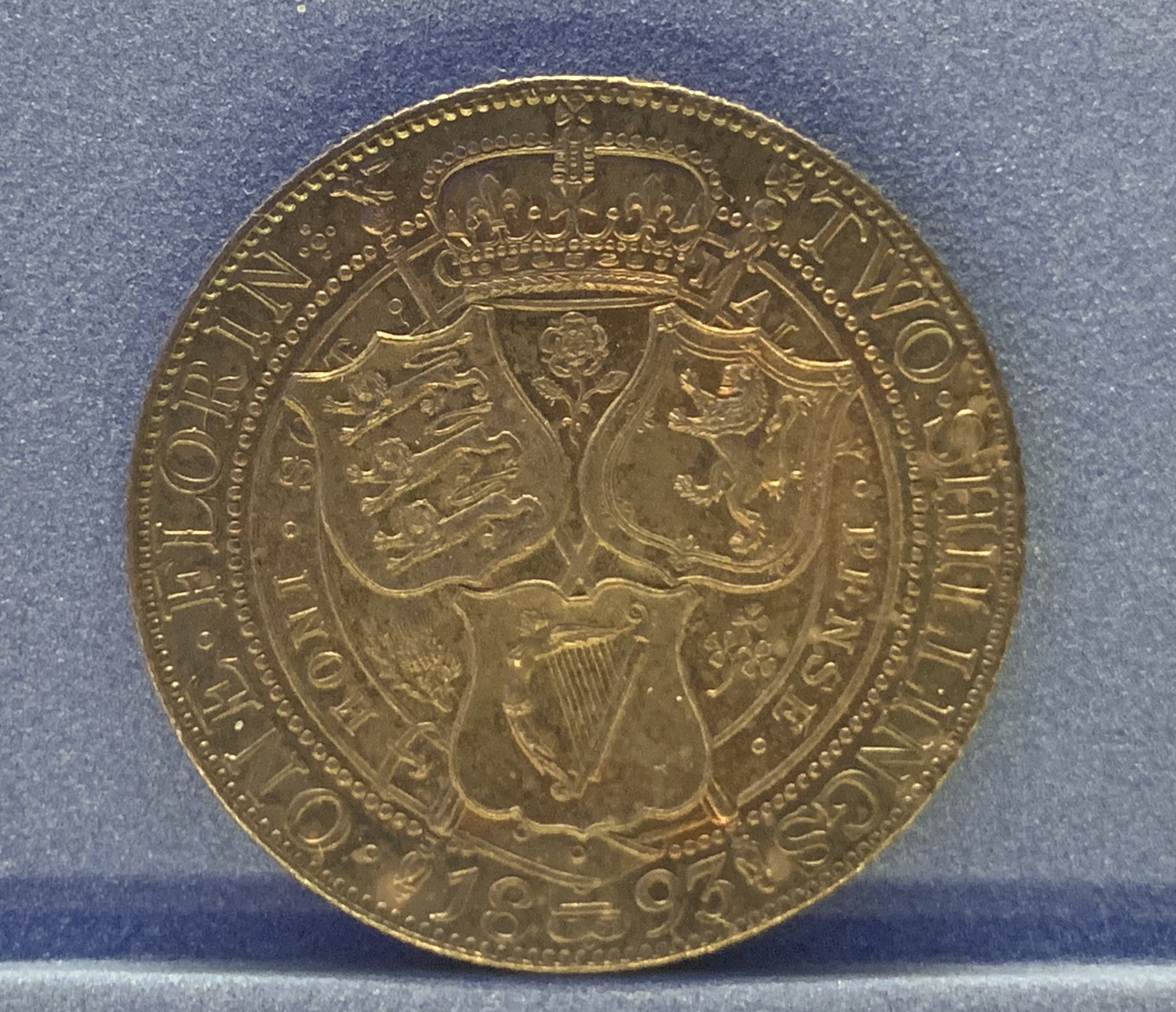
The new florin, designed by Poynter

Not all liked the new visage of the Queen. The Liberal Unionist MP, James Parker Smith, stated in the House of Commons that the new sovereigns reminded him of the whist counters that could be purchased at twenty for tuppence; "he did not think anyone who was conversant with coins would be quite satisfied with it. A great deal too much was attempted to be crowded into the design". Victoria herself may have been dissatisfied with the new obverse, for the new chancellor, William Harcourt, wrote to her on 1 February 1893 expressing "his entire concurrence in Your Majesty's View that the Queen's head in the new coinage leaves much to be desired both in likeness and execution". The painter, Philip Wilson Steer, felt that the Queen's necklace, earring and orders gave the new obverse "a certain tawdry look" and felt that Poynter's designs were cramped, with the lettering on the shilling oversized. There was some objection from Wales to the exclusion of any emblem of that country from the coinage, given the depiction of symbols of England, Scotland and Ireland, and some wanted a leek or dragon included. John Leighton of the Society of Antiquaries, though, stated that he found the leek "far from decorative and as difficult to characterise as a carrot".

Fremantle deemed the new obverse "almost the popular portrait of the Queen" and praised De Saulles for his part in "the favourable reception of coins both by experts and by the public generally". Sets of proof coins of the new issue, dated 1893, were sold by the Royal Mint to the public at a premium.

No bronze coins (the penny and its fractions) had been struck with the Jubilee portrait, as there was then a large surplus of them. In 1895, De Saulles adapted Brock's obverse for the bronze pieces, making modifications to their reverses, and these were made current by a proclamation dated 11 May 1895.

The Australian branch mints of Melbourne and Sydney struck sovereigns in every year from 1893 to 1901. Half sovereigns were struck at Sydney in each year, and at Melbourne in 1893, 1896, 1899 and 1900. In 1899, a third Australian branch mint began to strike sovereigns. This was the Perth Mint, inaugurated on 20 June 1899. It struck sovereigns in 1899, 1900 and 1901 and half sovereigns in 1899 and 1900.

Queen Victoria died in January 1901. Coins depicting her, dated 1901 and using the obverse by Brock, continued to be struck until the new coinage (designed by De Saulles) for her successor, Edward VII, was ready in May 1902.

== Bibliography ==
- Craig, John (2010) [1953]. The Mint (paperback ed.). Cambridge, UK: Cambridge University Press. ISBN 978-0-521-17077-2.
- Dyer, G. P. (1995). "Gold, Silver and the Double Florin" (PDF). British Numismatic Journal. 64: 114–125.
- Dyer, G. P.; Gaspar, P. P. (1992). "Reform, the New Technology and Tower Hill". In Challis, C. E. (ed.). A New History of the Royal Mint. Cambridge, UK: Cambridge University Press. pp. 398–606. ISBN 978-0-521-24026-0.
- Freeman, Michael J. (1985) [1970]. The Bronze Coinage of Great Britain (revised ed.). London: Barrie & Jenkins Ltd. ISBN 978-0-09-155240-4.
- Lant, Jeffrey L. (1973). "The Jubilee Coinage of 1887" (PDF). British Numismatic Journal. 43: 132–141.
- Linecar, Howard W.A. (1977). British Coin Designs and Designers. London: G. Bell & Sons Ltd. ISBN 978-0-7135-1931-0.
- Lobel, Richard, ed. (1999) [1995]. Coincraft's Standard Catalogue English & UK Coins 1066 to Date (5th ed.). London: Standard Catalogue Publishers Ltd. ISBN 978-0-9526228-8-8.
- Marsh, Michael A. (2017) [1980]. The Gold Sovereign (revised ed.). Exeter, Devon: Token Publishing Ltd. ISBN 978-1-908828-36-1.
- Seaby, Peter (1985). The Story of British Coinage. London: B. A. Seaby Ltd. ISBN 978-0-900652-74-5.
- Skillern, Stephen (October 2013). "The coinage of Edward VII, Part I". Coin News: 31–33.
- Spink (2016). Coins of England and the United Kingdom (52nd ed.). London: Spink. ISBN 978-1-907427-98-5.
- Stocker, Mark (1996). "The Coinage of 1893" (PDF). British Numismatic Journal. 66: 67–86.
