= Gasparo Molo =

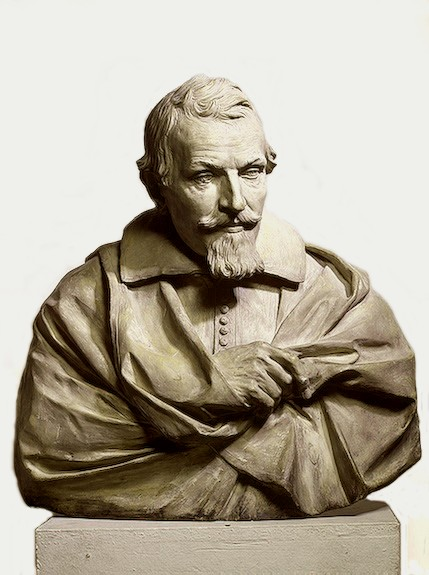
Statue of Gasparo Molo

Gasparo Molo (also spelt Mola or Moli) was an Italian goldsmith and planisher, chiefly known as a medalist.

== Biography ==
Born (according to Forrer) in Breglia near Como or (according to older records) in Lugano, his date of death is unknown. He was first active in Milan, then in Mantua, from 1608 in Florence; his first surviving signed medal is from the latter period. Here he was maestro delle stampe della monete. In 1609 he became well known for his medals commemorating the marriage and the accession of Cosimo II. In 1609 and 1610 he cut the dies for the thalers and the "medals of merit" conferred by the grand duke. According to Kenner, it is not necessary to suppose that he gave up his connection with the Florentine court at this time, because, in the following years, he struck medals for the court in Mantua, as well as coins for Guastalla and Castiglione, especially as he was again working in Florence in 1614 (certainly in 1615). The medals, which he made after 1620 for Prince Vincenzo II of Mantua, may very well also have been struck at Florence.

His further sojourn in Tuscany seems to have been rendered distasteful to him by intrigues. About 1623 he moved to Rome, where he became a die-cutter at the Papal mint in place of J. A. Moro, who died in 1625. Here he made a great many coins and medals for Urban VIII (1623–44), Innocent X (1644–55), and Alexander VII (1655–57).

His last works date from 1664. As it seems strange that Molo should, at the age of eighty-four, still continue working with unabated strength, it is thought that another artist of his name - perhaps his son - continued Gasparo's work. Indeed, a G. D. Molo is attested in 1639, who might have been a son of Gasparo and who apparently died young; but it is more likely that Gasparo founded a school in Rome, and that his engravers worked according to his instructions and his style, but passed off their works under his name and with his signature.

One of his numerous pupils was his successor at the Mint, Hamerani (Hameran, a German), the founder of the long-lived Hamerani family of artists. As long as cast medals were generally used, public interest in the portrait predominated, and the reverse was usually neglected. This changed with the introduction of stamping, which Molo preferred, and in which he developed new techniques.

== Sources ==
- cites
  - Kenner in Jahrb. der kunsthistor. Sammlungen des Ah. Kaiserhauses, XII (Vienna, 1891), 137–49;
  - Leonard Forrer, Biographical Dictionary of Medallists, etc. (4 vols., London, 1902–09).
