= Numismatic Circular =

- Cover of March 2010 issue
- Type: Bimonthly
- Founded: 1892
- Language: English
- Headquarters: London, UK
- ISSN: 0263-7677

The Numismatic Circular was an international periodical published by coin dealers Spink from December 1892 until January 2014.

Originally edited by Leonard Forrer, it was published monthly and offered collectors fixed price listings of coins, medals (both commemorative and military), tokens and banknotes. It would also circulate articles of numismatic interest including auction results and wider research into Ancient, British and World numismatics.

Despite its discontinuance in printed format in January 2014, it was the longest running such publication in existence.

In February 2020, Spink announced that the Numismatic Circular was to be re-launched as an online-only auction format.
