= British Guianan guilder =

The guilder was the currency of British Guiana (initially known as Essequibo and Demerara) between 1796 and 1839.

== History ==
The Guianese guilder replaced the Dutch guilder at par after the colonies were captured by the British from the Dutch. The guilder was initially subdivided into 20 Stuivers, in English stivers. Brazilian peças (6,400 réis gold coins), known locally as joes, circulated at a value of 22 guilders. The exchange rate to the British pound was initially fixed at 1 pound = 12 guilders (1 guilder = 20 pence).

In 1836, the guilder was reduced in value to 16 pence and, in 1839, the British pound and British Guiana dollar replaced the guilder as the currency of British Guiana, at the rates of £1 = 15 guilders and $1 = 3 1/8 guilders (thus £1 = $4.8; $1 = 4s 2d, or 50d).

== Coins ==
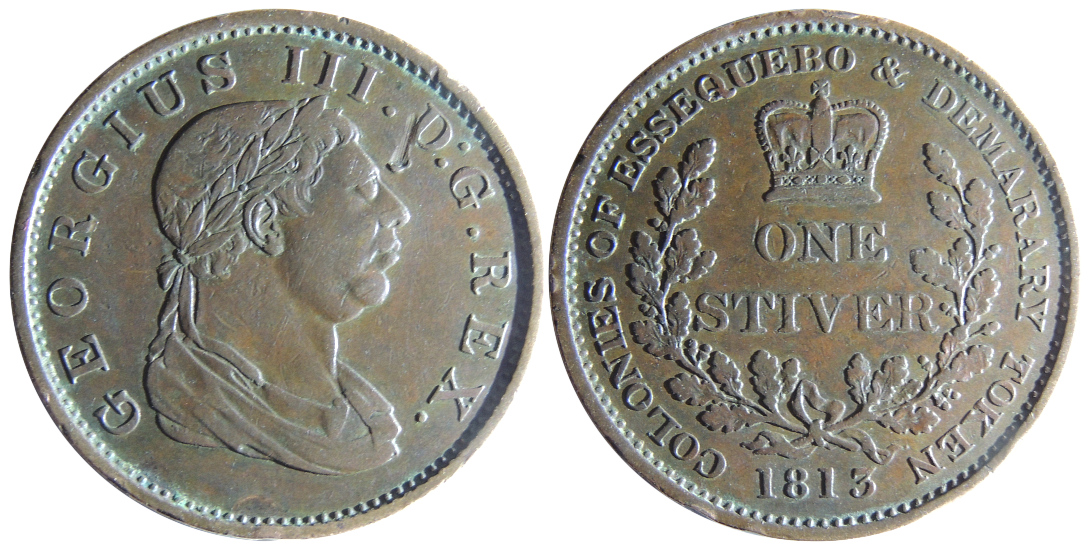
Demerary and Essequebo, one stiver of the 1813s

The first issue of coins from 1798 and 1799 were overstamps on Brazilian pecas. These were followed in 1808 by an issue which consisted of holed Spanish dollars, worth 3 guilders, and the plugs, worth 3 bits (equal to 15 stiver).

In 1809, regular coins were issued for Essequibo and Demerara in denominations of 1/4, 1/2, 1, 2 and 3 guilders, followed in 1813 by 1/2 and 1 stiver coins and 1/8 guilder coins from 1832.

1836 saw the introduction of a new series of coins denominated solely in guilders. This year also saw the first production of fourpenny coins by the British Royal Mint for use in British Guiana (worth 1/4 guilder) which did not bear any indication of where the coins were to circulate (they later also circulated in the UK). Twopenny coins (worth 1/8 guilder) were issued in the same way from 1838.

== Banknotes ==
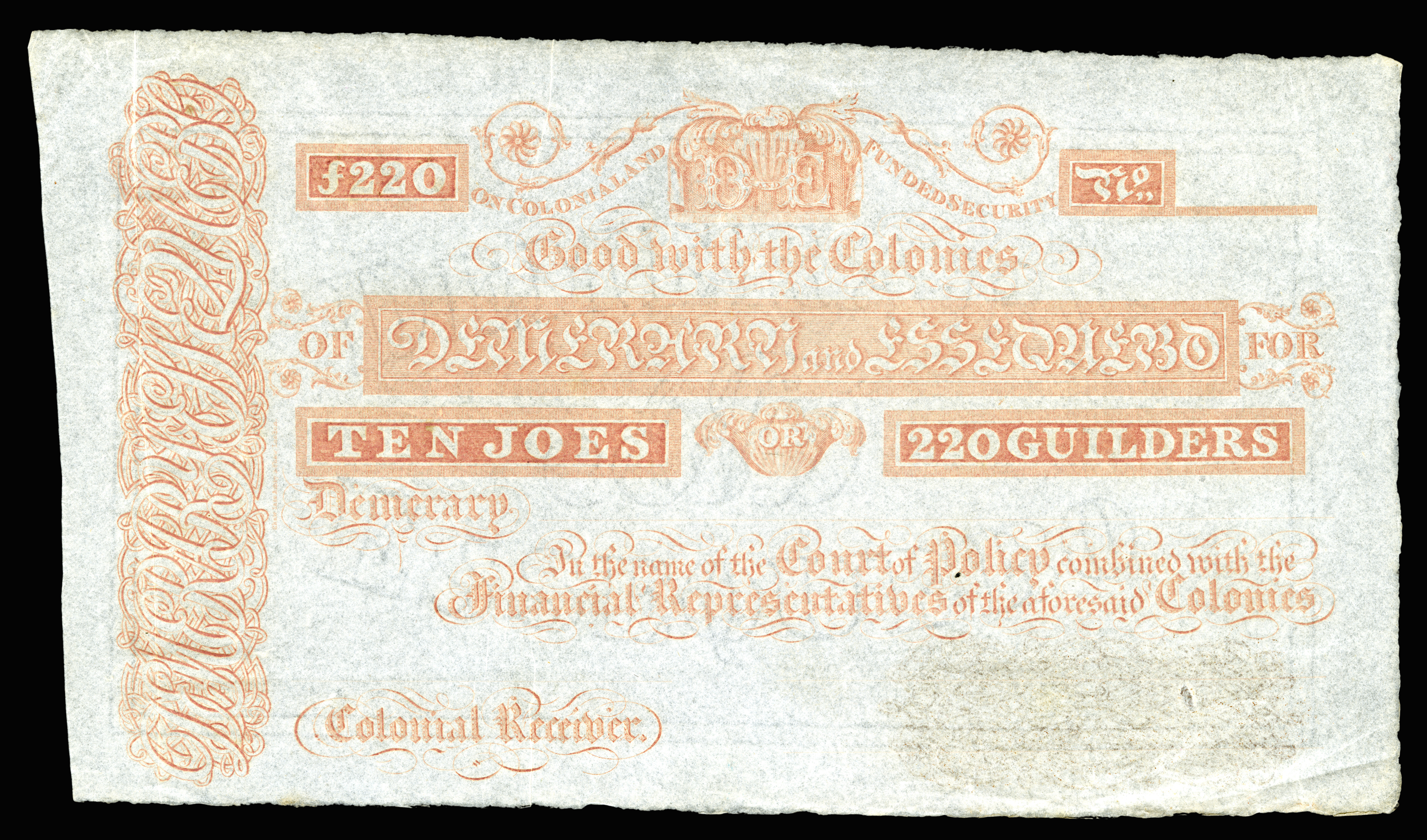
Demerary and Essequebo, 10 joes (220 guilders) of the 1830s

In the 1830s, the colonies issued paper money denominated in joes and guilders. There were notes of 1, 2, 3 and 10 joes (22, 44, 66 and 220 guilders). It wasn’t until 1916 that the Government of British Guiana begin issuing dollar-denominated banknotes. Banknotes produced specifically for British Guiana ceased in 1942, and were replaced by British West Indies dollars in 1951. In 1955, the British West Indies dollar was decimalized and issued in the name of the British Caribbean Territories, Eastern Group. In 1965, the East Caribbean dollar replaced the British West Indies dollar and circulated in British Guiana for a year until, following independence in 1966, the Guyanese dollar was introduced, replacing the East Caribbean dollar at par.
