= Small Diamond Crown of Queen Victoria =

Miniature crown made in 1870

Small Diamond Crown
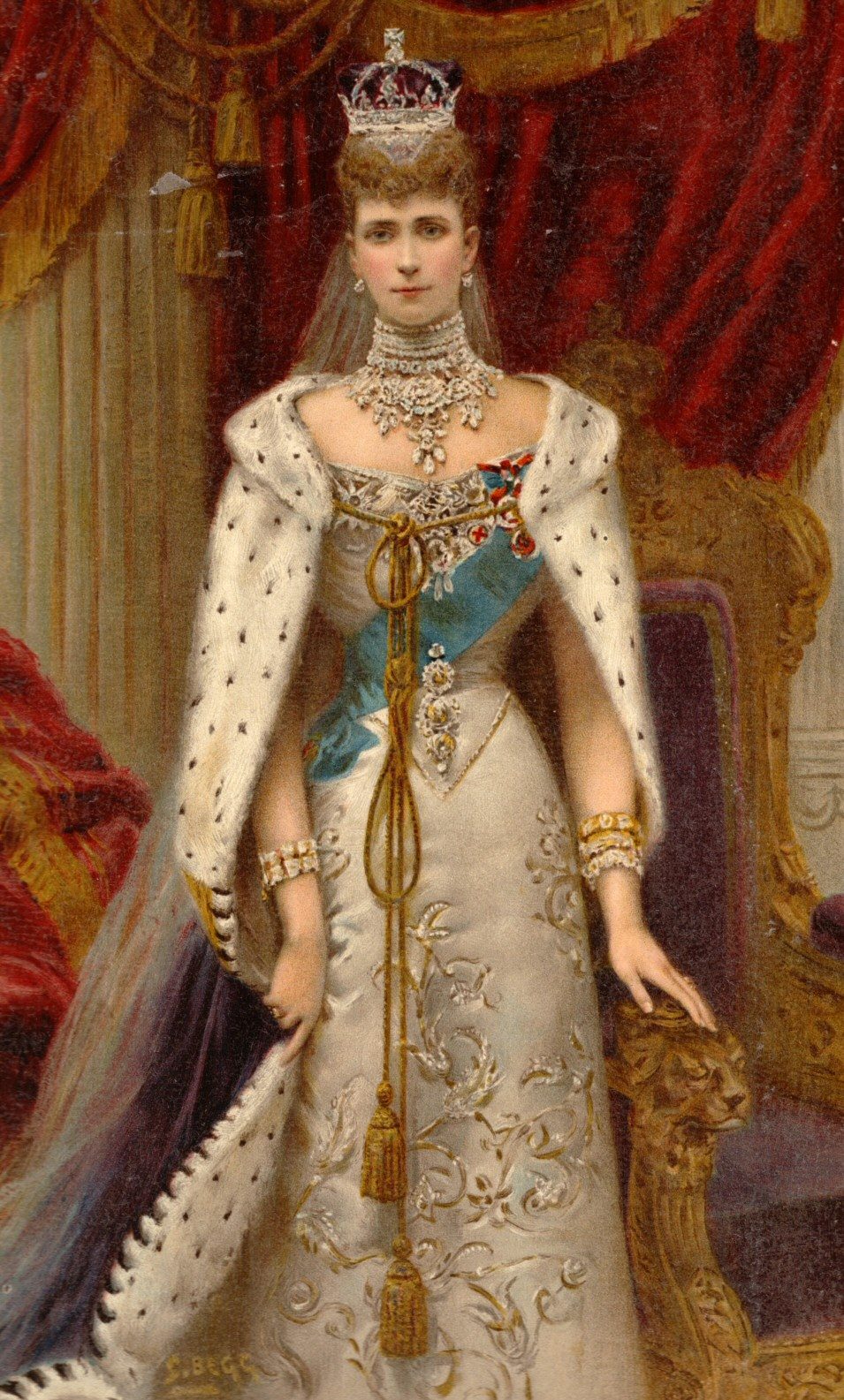
- Queen Alexandra wearing the crown

Details
- Country: United Kingdom
- Made: 1870
- Weight: 160 g
- Arches: 2
- Material: Silver
- Cap: None
- Notable stones: Diamonds

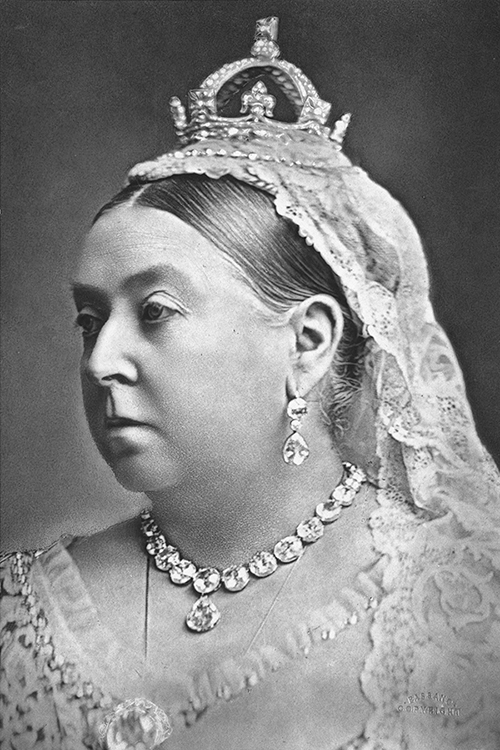
Queen Victoria, 1887

The Small Diamond Crown of Queen Victoria is a miniature imperial and state crown made at the request of Queen Victoria in 1870 to wear over her widow's cap following the death of her husband, Prince Albert. It was perhaps the crown most associated with the queen and is one of the Crown Jewels on public display in the Jewel House at the Tower of London.

== Background ==
Following the death of Prince Albert of Saxe-Coburg and Gotha, Victoria's husband, in 1861, Queen Victoria withdrew from public life and wore a black and white ensemble colloquially known as widow's weeds, which she continued to wear until her death in 1901. Under government pressure she came back into public view in 1870. However, she declined to wear her Imperial State Crown again, partly because she found it heavy and uncomfortable to wear, and partly because it would have been impossible to wear on top of her widow's cap. The new small crown was created as a substitute, meeting both the ceremonial duties of a monarch and her own desired form of dress as a widow. It was manufactured in March 1870 by the Crown Jewellers, Garrard & Co.

== Design ==
Although diminutive, the silver crown follows the standard design for British crowns. It is made up of two arches joining at a monde surmounted by a cross. Each of the arches runs from a cross pattée along the rim of the base. Between each cross pattée is a fleur-de-lis. Because of its small size – 9 cm (3 1/2 in) across and 10 cm (4 in) high – the crown possesses no internal cap. It contains 1,162 brilliant and 138 rose-cut diamonds weighing 132 carats (26.4 g) that were taken from a large necklace belonging to the queen. Unlike coloured gemstones, diamonds were seen as acceptable to wear in mourning. The crown weighs 160 g (5 3/4 oz) in total.

== Usage ==
Queen Victoria first used her new crown at the State Opening of Parliament on 9 February 1871. She often wore it minus the arches as a circlet or open crown. Following Victoria's death, the crown was placed on her coffin at Osborne House.

== After Victoria ==
The crown had belonged to Queen Victoria personally, rather than to the Crown, and thus was not a part of the Crown Jewels. Victoria left it to the Crown in her will. It was subsequently worn on occasions by the queen consort, Alexandra of Denmark (1901–1910), and after her by the next queen consort, Mary of Teck (1910–1936). After the death of Mary's husband, George V, she stopped wearing the crown. When the new queen consort, Elizabeth Bowes-Lyon (1936–1952), decided not to wear the Small Diamond Crown, it was deposited by Queen Victoria's great-grandson, George VI, in the Jewel House at the Tower of London, where it remains on public display.
