= Widow's cap =

Sign of mourning worn by women after the death of their husbands

A widow's cap (or mourning cap), a sign of mourning worn by many women after the death of their husbands, was a sign of religious and social significance and was worn through the first mourning period during the 19th century (Victorian era).

== History ==
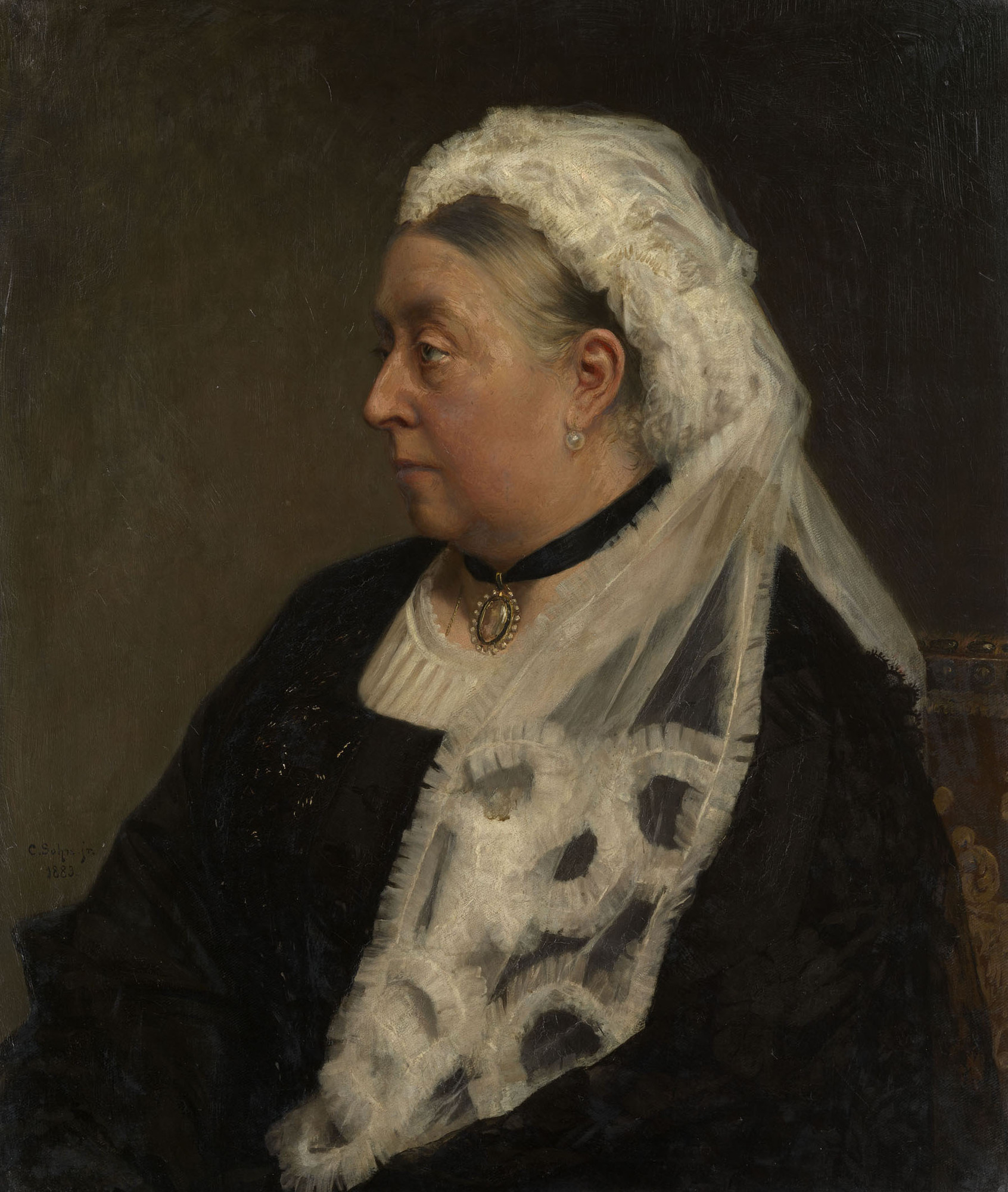
Victoria in later life wearing a white mourning cap (1883)

After Queen Victoria's husband, Prince Albert, died of typhoid on 14 December 1861, she wore mourning dress for more than forty years until her own death in 1901. She fully mourned for three years and dressed her whole court the same way. The queen's conduct strengthened traditions of public mourning during the Victorian era.

Victorian mourning fashion was aimed particularly at women, widows to be precise. The fashion had the function of signalling the widow's social distance just as Queen Victoria had done. Mourning attire was the main way to show how wealthy and respectable a woman was.

== Material ==
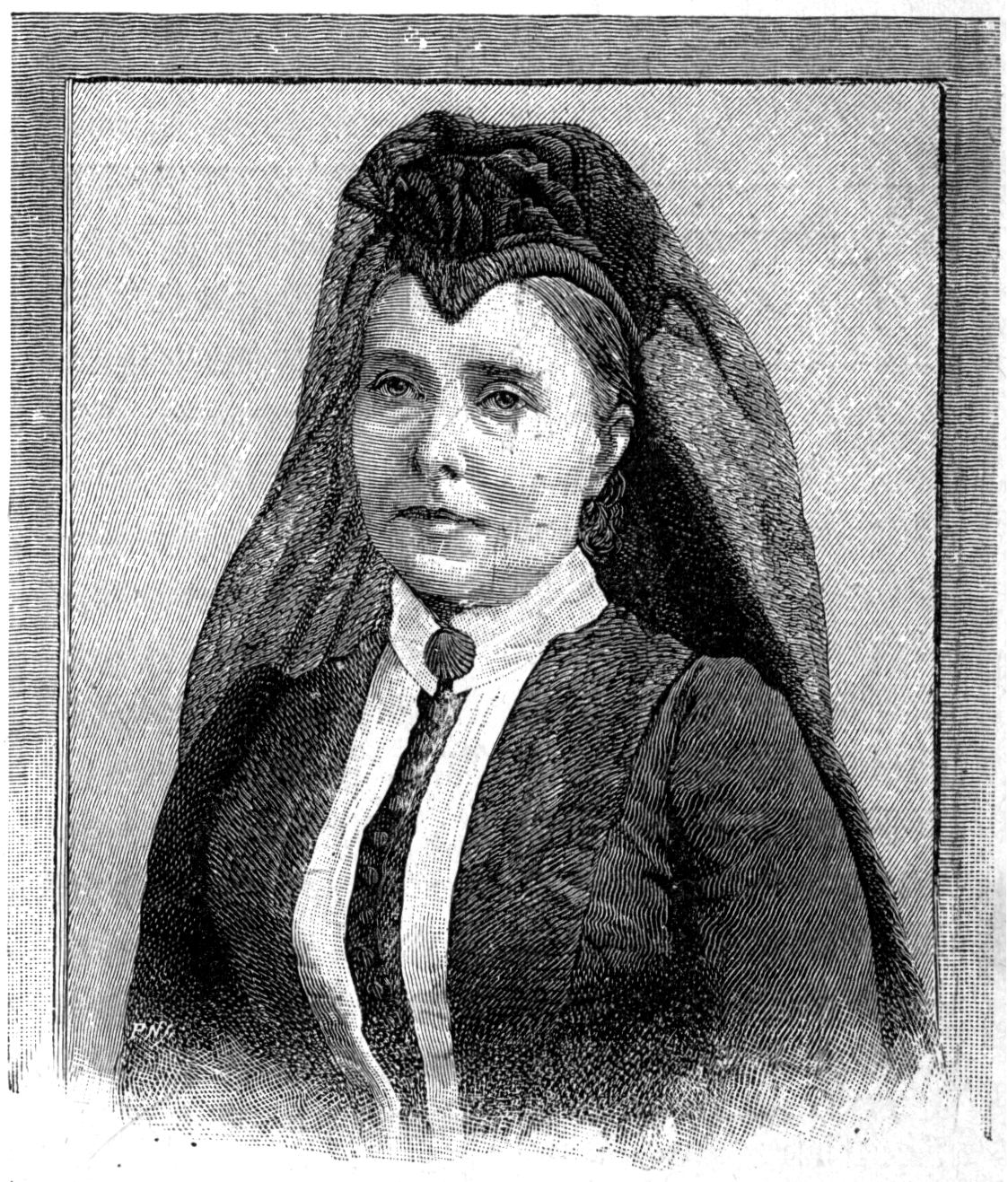
A Victorian woman wearing a widow's cap. Illustration from The Strand Magazine (1890).

A Victorian mourning cap was identified by its black colour or tone (depending on the level of mourning). The more recent the loss the simpler the design. The shape of the cap depended on the age of the widow but the most common was peaked at the front. Widows' caps were either lisse, tulle or tarlatan, shape depending mainly on the age. Young widows wore mainly the Mary Stuart shape, but all widows' caps had long streamers. Their prices were various. Tarlatan could be home-made, but widows did not like home-made widows' caps because even though economical, they were ruined quicker than bought caps. It was smart to buy extra streamers and bows for them as they could be used at home to trim mourning caps.

== Mary Stuart cap ==
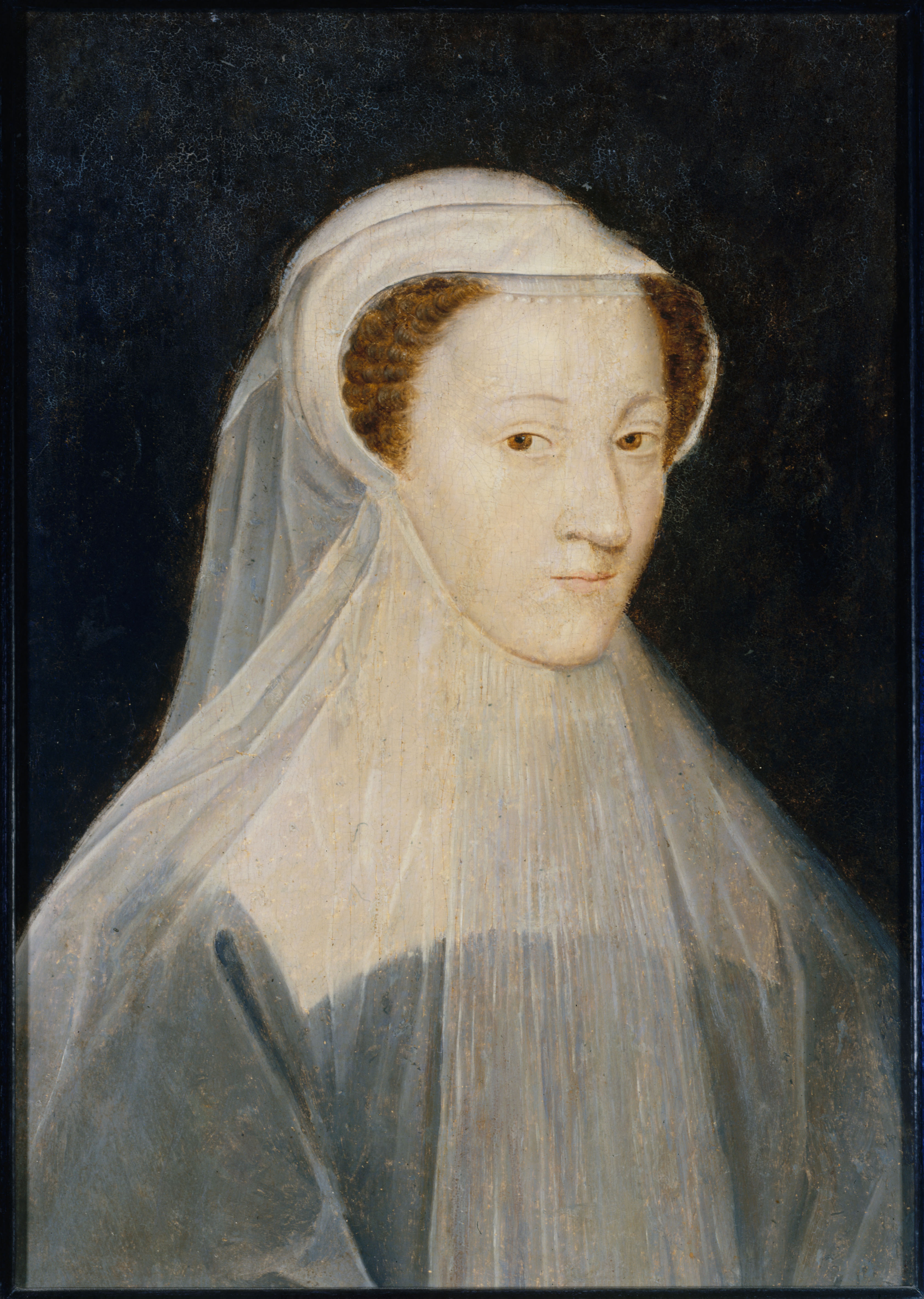
Mary, Queen of Scots in white mourning for her husband (1560)

A Mary Stuart cap, or attifet, is a type of hat which was made well known in the 16th century, thanks to it regularly appearing in portraits of Mary, Queen of Scots. This specially styled cap became quite fashionable for a small period of time, and even became part of formal mourning dress until the 19th century. A classic Mary Stuart cap is discerned by being very tight, with a solid piece of triangular material which hangs over the forehead, creating a heart shape when it is viewed from the front. The design was intended to hold a veil, which would usually be worn over the cap, and the material might be rolled into shape in the back or formed with wires which held it tightly in place. The cap also flickered slightly at the sides to accommodate rolls of hair.

== See also ==
- List of hat styles
