= Leonard Forrer =

Swiss-born British historian (1869–1953)

Leonard Forrer or Leonhard Forrer (7 November 1869, Winterthur, Switzerland – 17 November 1953, Bromley, United Kingdom) was a Swiss-born numismatist and coin dealer. He was later naturalised as a British subject.

== Life ==
He came to study in England in 1887 and two years later began working for Spink and Son, an art dealer's in London. He soon became responsible for their sales of coins and medals and developed that sector of their business to a world-class level. From 1893 onwards he was editor of the Numismatic Circular. As well as several other publications and numismatic catalogues, he was most notable for his eight-volume biographical dictionary of medallists and mint magistrates from classical antiquity to 1900, still an important work. In 1944 he was awarded the medal of the Royal Numismatic Society. His sons Leonard Steyning Forrer (1895–1968) and Rudolph Forrer (1896–1974) also became coin dealers.

== Publications ==
- Biographical dictionary of medallists, coin-, gem-, and seal-engravers, mint-masters, etc. ancient and modern. With references to their works, B. C. 500 – A. D. 1900. London 1902–1930. 8 volumes.
  - Volume 1, (A–D), 1904 (University of Michigan)
  - Volume 2, (E–H), 1907 (Internet Archive) (not «1907», but 1904!)
  - Volume 3, (I–Maz), 1907 (Internet Archive)
  - Volume 4, (M.B.–Q), 1909 (Internet Archive)
  - Volume 5, (R–S), 1912 (Internet Archive)
  - Volume 6, (T–Z), 1916 (Internet Archive)
  - Supplement: Biographical notices of medallists... London 1924–1930. 2 volumes.
    - reprint of all 8 volumes: London 1979–1981, ISBN 90-70296-02-0, ISBN 90-70296-03-9.
    - with J. S. Martin: Index to Leonard Forrer's Biographical Dictionary of Medallists. London 1987.
