= Coinage of Upper Canada =

Upper Canada had a short history as a coin-issuing entity.

== King George IV Posthumous Issue (1832) ==
This coin was a 1/2d. token bearing a portrait of King George IV, even though it was issued two years after his death. The obverse of this piece is inscribed "PROVINCE OF UPPER CANADA". The reverse has a representation of Britannia facing from right to left.

== Bank of Upper Canada Coinage (1850-57) ==
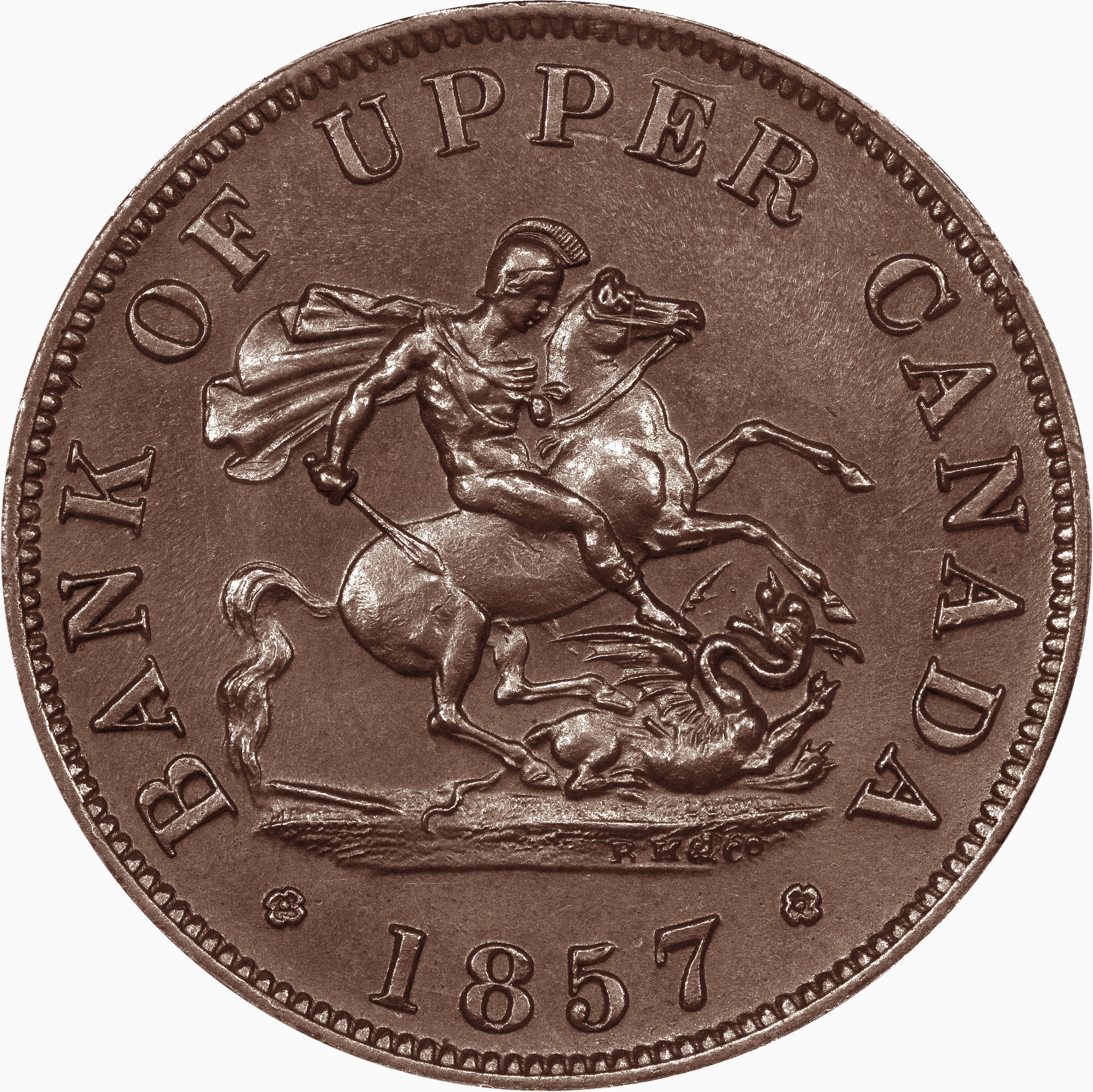
Obverse

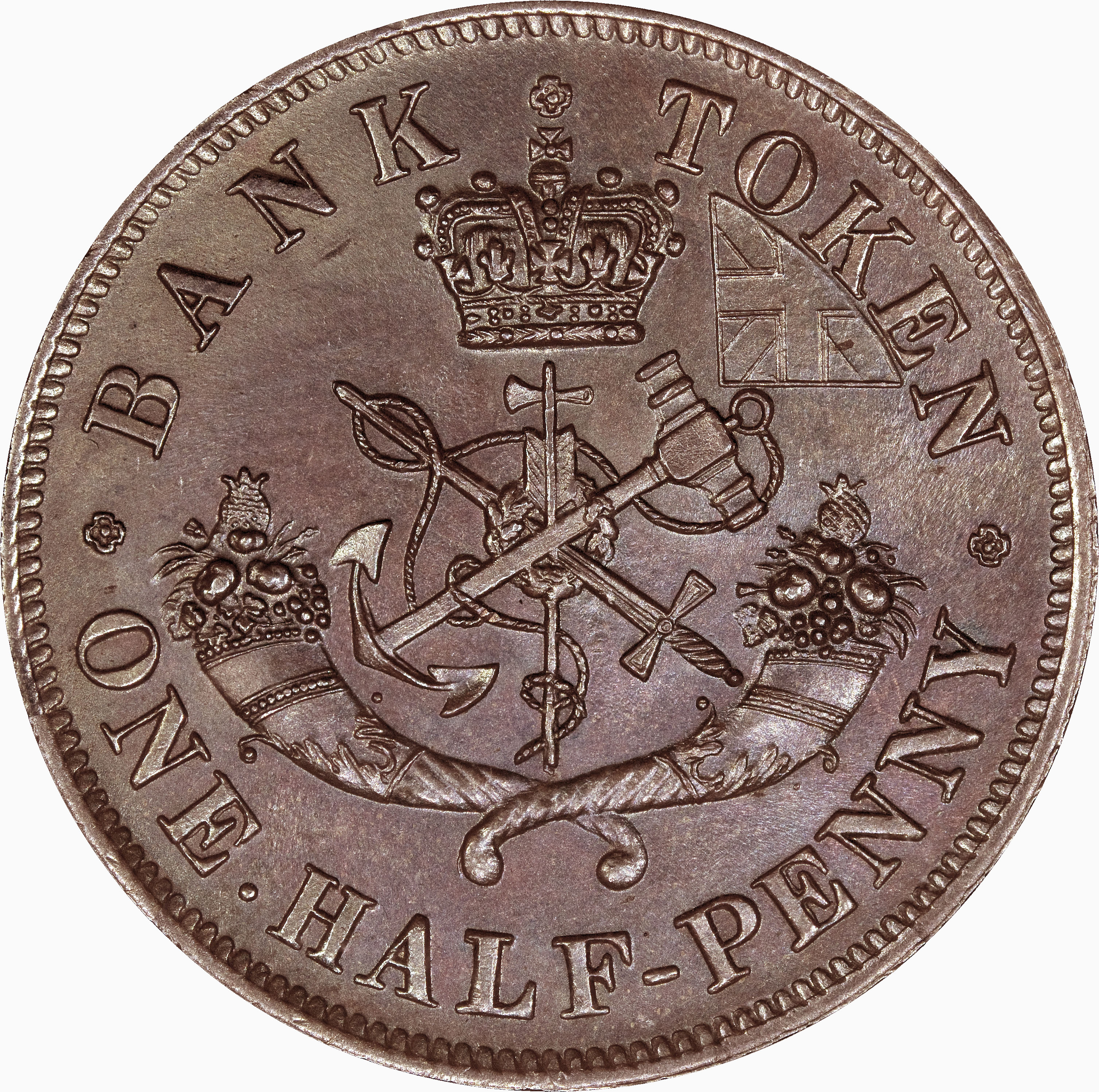
Reverse

A Bank of Upper Canada half-penny token struck in 1857.

In 1850, the Bank of Upper Canada received the right to issue a coinage due to a severe coin shortage. The coinage consisted of 1/2 Penny and 1 Penny Bank Tokens. The obverse of the coins carried a representation of St.George slaying the dragon based on Benedetto Pistrucci's gold sovereign coinage design. The reverse of the coins carried the then obsolete Coat-of-Arms of Upper Canada. The 1850 issue was struck at the Royal Mint, London, but the coins did not arrive in Canada until 1851. Some of the 1d. pieces bear a dot between the tips of the cornucopiae, but the significance of this is unknown. The letters "R.K. & Co." is not a mintmark. It is the mark of Rowe, Kentish and Company of London, the agents the Bank of Upper Canada used to place their coin orders.

In 1852, the Royal Mint started to strike the second issue, but due to a heavy schedule and time pressure, the coin dies and planchets were transferred to Heaton's Mint. There is a way that the strikings can be distinguished. The Royal Mint issue has the dies in medallic alignment, whereas, the Heaton's Mint issue has the dies in coin alignment.

In 1854, Heaton's Mint were asked to strike a new coinage. There are two types of '4's' in the date: a plain '4', and a crosslet '4'.

In 1857, Heaton's Mint were asked to strike this final coinage. The reason why this was the final coinage was, because the introduction of a decimal currency into Canada was being contemplated.

In 1863, the Bank of Upper Canada complained to the Canadian government that it had a hard time trying to issue their final coinage because of the change to decimal currency. The government bought the coins and stored them in a warehouse as copper bullion. After Canadian Confederation, the coins were melted in 1873 under government supervision.
