= Distinguished Conduct Medal =

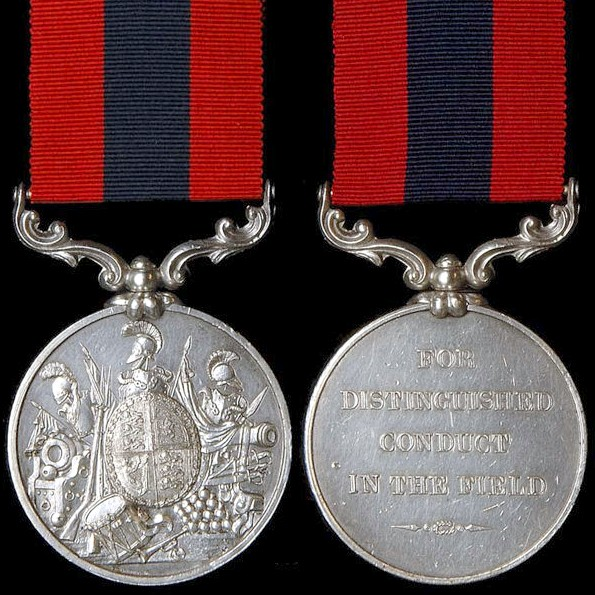
- Queen Victoria version
- Type: Military decoration for bravery
- Awarded for: Gallantry in the field
- Country: British Empire
- Presented by: the Monarch of the United Kingdom of Great Britain and Ireland
- Eligibility: Other ranks
- Post-nominals: DCM
- Status: Discontinued in 1993
- Established: 4 December 1854
- First award: 1855
- Final award: 1993

Highlights
- Total: 30,200+
- Ribbon bar without and with rosette to indicate award of a bar

Order of Wear
- Next (higher): Air Force Cross
- Equivalent: Distinguished Conduct Medal (Natal)
- Next (lower): Conspicuous Gallantry Medal
- Related: Distinguished Service Order

The Distinguished Conduct Medal (DCM) was a British military decoration instituted in 1854 by Queen Victoria to recognise gallantry in the field by other ranks of the British Army. It was the oldest British award for gallantry and served as the second highest military decoration for bravery, ranking just below the Victoria Cross. The medal remained in use until 1993, when it was discontinued and succeeded by the Conspicuous Gallantry Cross. In addition to British personnel, the medal was also awarded to non-commissioned members of the armed forces from other Commonwealth Dominions and Colonies.

== Institution ==
The Distinguished Conduct Medal was instituted by Royal Warrant on 4 December 1854, during the Crimean War, as an award to warrant officers, non-commissioned officers and men of the British Army for "distinguished, gallant and good conduct in the field". For all ranks below commissioned officer, it was the second highest award for gallantry in action after the Victoria Cross, and the other ranks equivalent of the Distinguished Service Order, which was awarded only to commissioned officers.

Before its institution, there had been no official medal awarded by the British Crown in recognition of individual acts of gallantry in the Army. The Meritorious Service Medal, established in 1845 to reward long serving warrant officers and sergeants, was awarded several times up to 1854 for gallantry in action, although this was not the medal's main purpose. One earlier award specifically for acts of gallantry by other ranks was the unofficial Sir Harry Smith's Medal for Gallantry, instituted by Major General Sir Harry Smith in 1851. Although the British government initially disapproved of Sir Harry's institution of the medal, it subsequently paid for it and thereby gave it recognition, but not official status.

The Distinguished Conduct Medal was awarded with a gratuity, that varied in amount depending on rank, and given on the recipient's discharge from the Army.

Since January 1918 recipients have been entitled to the post-nominal letters DCM.

A bar to the medal, introduced in 1881, could be awarded in recognition of each subsequent act of distinguished conduct for which the medal would have been awarded.

During the First World War, concern arose that the high number of medals being awarded would devalue the medal's prestige. The Military Medal was therefore instituted on 25 March 1916 as an alternative and lower award, with the Distinguished Conduct Medal reserved for more exceptional acts of bravery. Around 25,000 Distinguished Conduct Medals were awarded during the First World War, with approximately 1,900 during the Second World War.

== Eligibility ==
The Distinguished Conduct Medal could also be awarded to military personnel serving in any of the Sovereign's forces in the British Empire, with the first awards to colonial troops made in 1872, to the West India Regiment. Members of the Indian Army remained ineligible since they could receive the Indian Order of Merit and, from 1907, the Indian Distinguished Service Medal.

From September 1916, members of the Royal Naval Division were made eligible for military decorations, including the Distinguished Conduct Medal, for the war's duration. Otherwise, it remained an exclusively Army award until 1942, when other ranks of the Royal Navy, Royal Air Force and the Navies and Air Forces of the Dominions and Colonies also became eligible for distinguished conduct in action on the ground.

In 1979 eligibility for a number of British awards, including the DCM, was extended to permit posthumous awards. Until that time, only the Victoria Cross and a mention in dispatches could be awarded posthumously.

== Adoption ==
In May 1894, Queen Victoria authorised Colonial governments to adopt various military medals for award to their local military forces. The Colony of Natal and the Cape Colony introduced this system in August and September 1894 respectively, and the Transvaal Colony followed in December 1902, while Australia, Canada and New Zealand also adopted the medal. However, only the Natal and Canada versions were finally awarded.

A territorial version of the Distinguished Conduct Medal was approved for the Union of South Africa in 1913, but was never awarded. More than 300 members of the Union Defence Forces were awarded the applicable British versions of the decoration during the two World Wars.

In 1903 specific African Distinguished Conduct Medals were established for the King's African Rifles and the Royal West African Frontier Force. These were superseded by the British Distinguished Conduct Medal in 1943.

These colonial Distinguished Conduct Medals were of the same design as the British version, with an additional territorial or unit inscription on the reverse, in a curved line above the regular inscription.

== Discontinuation ==
In the aftermath of the 1993 review of the British honours system, which formed part of the drive to remove distinctions of rank in respect of awards for bravery, the Distinguished Conduct Medal was discontinued, as was the Conspicuous Gallantry Medal and the award, specifically for gallantry, of the Distinguished Service Order. These three decorations were replaced by the Conspicuous Gallantry Cross, to serve as the second level award for gallantry for all ranks of all the Arms of the Service.

After the Second World War, most Commonwealth countries created their own honours system and no longer recommended British awards. The last Distinguished Conduct Medal awards for the Canadian Army were for Korea. The last Australian DCM award was announced in The London Gazette on 1 September 1972 for Vietnam, as was the last New Zealand award, announced on 25 September 1970. Canada, Australia and New Zealand replaced the DCM in the 1990s, as part of the creation of their own gallantry awards under their own honours systems.

== Order of wear ==
In the order of wear prescribed by the British Central Chancery of the Orders of Knighthood, the Distinguished Conduct Medal ranks on par with the Distinguished Conduct Medal (Natal) and takes precedence after the Air Force Cross and before the Conspicuous Gallantry Medal.

== Description ==
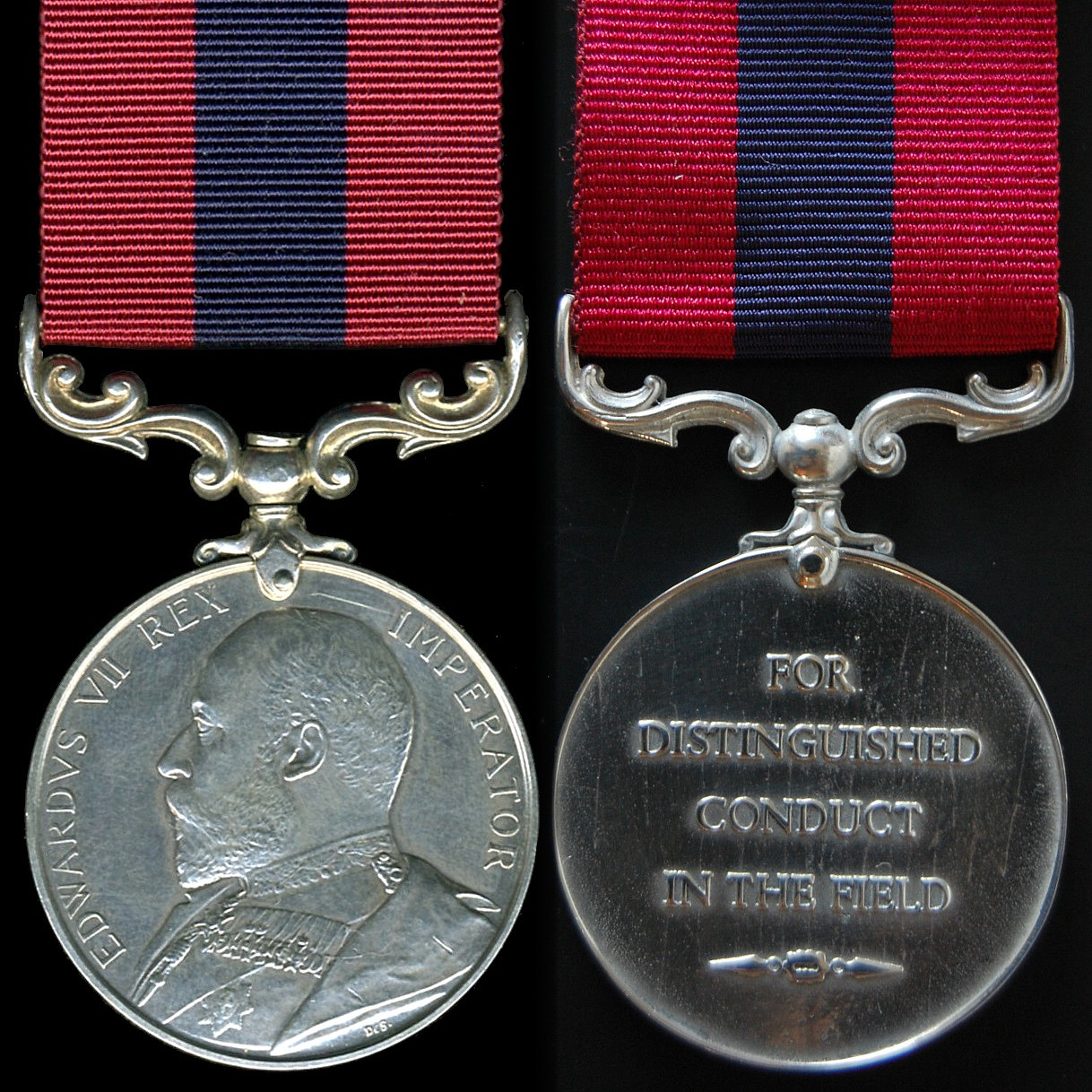
King Edward VII version

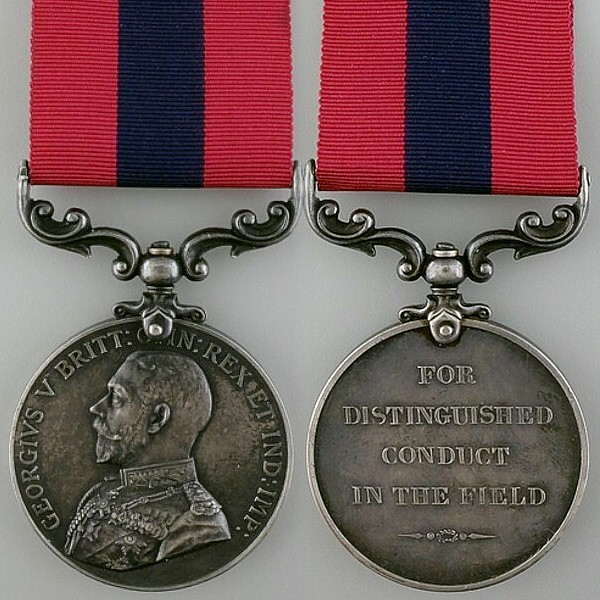
King George V version 1

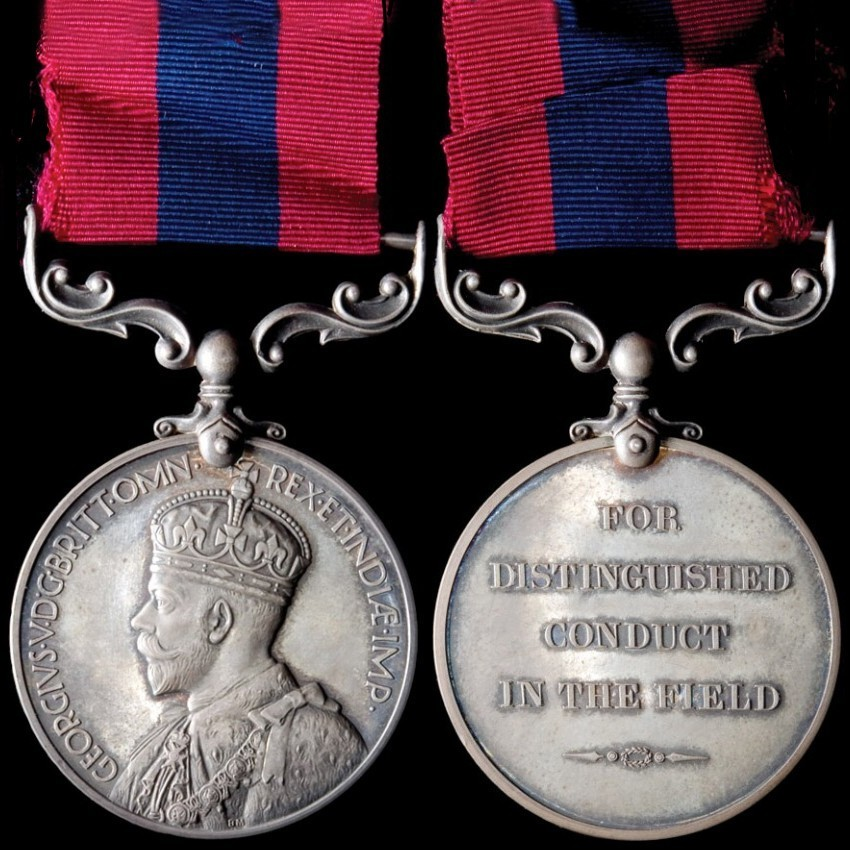
King George V version 2

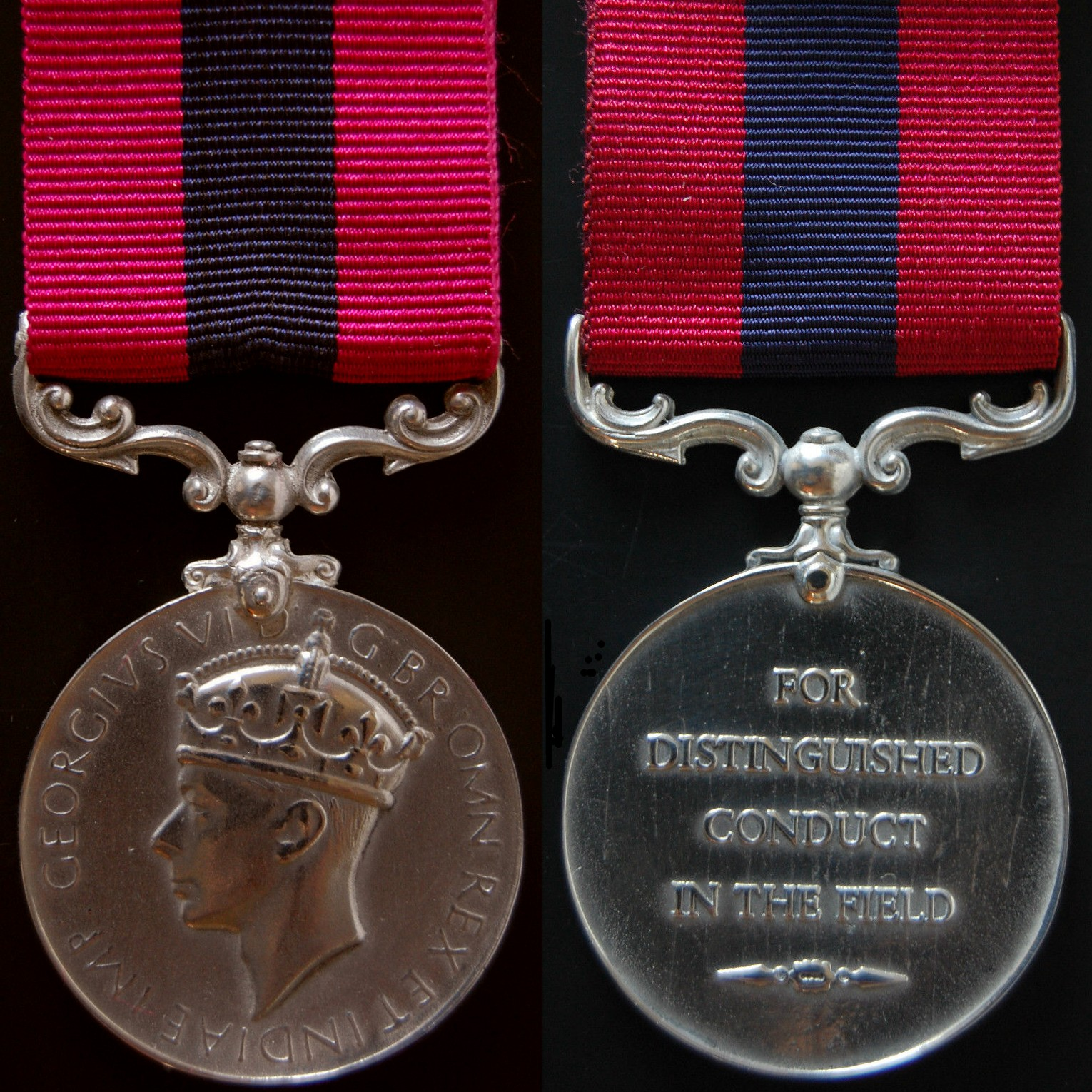
King George VI version 1

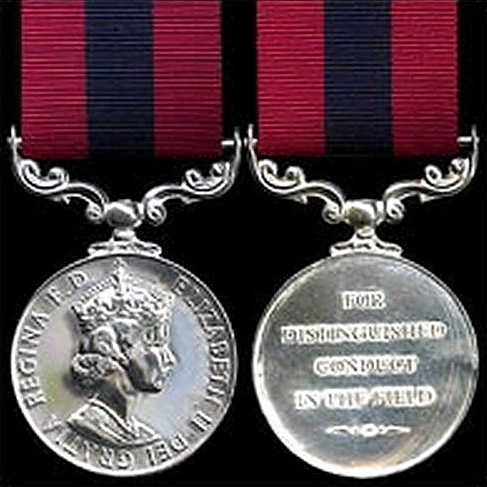
Queen Elizabeth II version

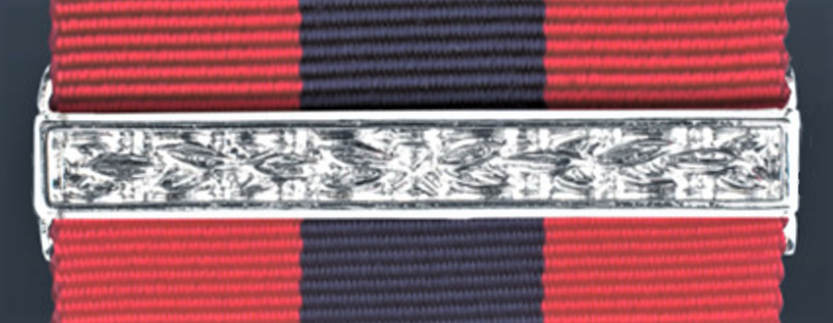
Second award bar, design from mid–1916

The medal was struck in silver and is a disk, 36 millimetres (1.4 inches) in diameter and 3 millimetres (0.12 inches) thick. The suspender of all versions is of an ornamented scroll pattern. The manner of attachment of the suspender to the medal varied between medal versions and, on early versions, allows the medal to swivel.
All medals awarded bear the recipient's number, rank, name and unit on the rim.

Obverse

There were eight variants of the obverse:

- The original Victorian obverse shows a Trophy of Arms, designed by Benedetto Pistrucci, incorporating a central shield bearing the Royal Coat of Arms without any inscription, as also seen on early Army Long Service and Good Conduct Medal. From 1902, after the accession of King Edward VII, the effigy of the reigning monarch replaced the trophy of arms, with the respective titles of the monarch inscribed around the perimeter:
- King Edward VII – "EDWARDVS VII REX IMPERATOR".
- King George V, bareheaded – "GEORGIVS V BRITT: OMN: REX ET IND: IMP:".
- King George V, crowned – "GEORGIVS•V•D•G•BRITT•OMN•REX•ET•INDIÆ•IMP•". Issued for awards in the 1930s.
- King George VI – There were two versions, with those inscribed "GEORGIVS VI D:G:BR OMN REX ET INDIAE IMP:" awarded during the Second World War and immediately after, and "GEORGIVS VI DEI GRA: BRITT: OMN: REX FID: DEF:" current from the late 1940s. This second type was awarded, instead of the Elizabeth II version, to Canadians during the Korean War.
- Queen Elizabeth II – Two versions, with those inscribed "ELIZABETH II D:G:BR:OMN: REGINA F:D:" awarded in the mid-1950s and "ELIZABETH II DEI GRATIA REGINA F.D" awarded thereafter until 1993.

Reverse

The reverse of all versions is smooth, with a raised rim, and bears the inscription "FOR DISTINGUISHED CONDUCT IN THE FIELD" in four lines, underlined by a laurel wreath between two spear blades.

Bars

The bar for a second or subsequent award is straight and also of silver. Bars awarded between 1881 and mid–1916 bear the month and year of the subsequent award, while those awarded after mid–1916 bear a laurel-spray and no date. In undress uniform or on occasions when only ribbons are worn, a silver rosette is worn on the ribbon to indicate the award of each bar.

Ribbon

The ribbon is 32 millimetres wide and dark crimson, with a 10 millimetres wide navy blue band in the centre.

== Recipients ==
All awards of the Distinguished Conduct Medal were notified in the London Gazette and, during the First World War, citations were generally also included.

From 1854 to 1914 3,529 medals and 13 second award bars were awarded. Of these, about 808 medals were awarded for the Crimean War and 2,092 for the Second Boer War, with some of the latter being the Edward VII version. During the Boer War, six medals were awarded posthumously and six dated bars were awarded, three of them to recipients who had received their first Distinguished Conduct Medal in this war.

Any recipient of the Distinguished Conduct Medal during King Edward VII's reign had their award announced in the London Gazette, although a citation was rarely published.

For the First World War, 24,620 medals as well as 472 first bars and nine second bars were awarded, with 46 further awards for the period 1920–39.

During the First World War and after all soldiers who received the Distinguished Conduct Medal also had their award announced in the London Gazette, although unlike the earlier awards a brief citation was always included describing their gallant acts and why were given the award. The citation very often started with the words, "For conspicious gallantry and devotion to duty...."

For the Second World War, 1,891 medals and nine first bars were awarded.

Post War, a total of 153 DCMs were earned between 1947 and 1979, including 45 to Australian and New Zealand forces for service in Vietnam. A further 25 awards were made after 1979, nine for service in Northern Ireland, eight for the South Atlantic, and eight for the Gulf War, including a number of retrospective awards up to 2006.

Honorary awards of the Distinguished Conduct Medal were made to members of allied forces, including 5,227 for the First World War and 107 for the Second World War. (Lists of WW1 awards to allied forces are kept in country specific files within the WO 388/6 series at Kew, and were published in 2018.)

Australia

Beginning in the Second Boer War, the Distinguished Conduct Medal has been awarded to 2,071 members of the Australian Army and to three members of the Royal Australian Air Force. Thirty first Bars were awarded, all to members of the Army and the majority for actions during the First World War. The last award to an Australian was made in 1972, arising from the Vietnam War.

Canada

The medal was first awarded to a Canadian on 19 April 1901. Altogether, there were 2,132 awards to Canadian Army and Royal Canadian Air Force personnel, 38 first Bars and one second Bar.

New Zealand

Between 1899 and 1970, 525 awards of the Distinguished Conduct Medal were made to New Zealanders.

South Africa

More than 300 Distinguished Conduct Medals were awarded to South Africans during the two World Wars.

== See also ==
- Distinguished Conduct Medal (Natal)
- West African Frontier Force & King's African Rifles Distinguished Conduct Medal
- Orders and decorations of the Commonwealth realms
- Recipients of the Distinguished Conduct Medal

== Sources and further reading ==
- Abbott, Peter E. (1975). Recipients of the Distinguished Conduct Medal, 1855–1909, A List with other Details of all who Received the Medal before the Outbreak of World War 1. J. B. Hayward and Son. ISBN 0903754096.
- Abbott, Peter E.; Tamplin, John (1981). British Gallantry Awards (2nd ed.). Nimrod Dix and Co, London. ISBN 9780902633742.
- Duckers, Peter (2001). British Gallantry Awards 1855–2000. Shire Publications, Risborough, Buckinghamshire, UK. ISBN 9780747805168.
- McDermott, Philip (1994). For Distinguished Conduct in the Field, the Register of the DCM 1920–1993. ISBN 9780903754651.
- Mussell, John W., ed. (2014). Medals Yearbook 2015. Token Publishing, Honiton, Devon. ISBN 9781908828163.
- Walker, Robert (1981). Recipients of the Distinguished Conduct Medal 1914–1920. Midland Medals. ISBN 090745500X.
- Williamson, Howard J. (2025). The Annotated DCM Roll 1914-1920 Volumes I & II (1st ed.). privately published by Anne Williamson.
