= Waterloo Medal (Pistrucci) =

1849 British medal

- United Kingdom

Obverse
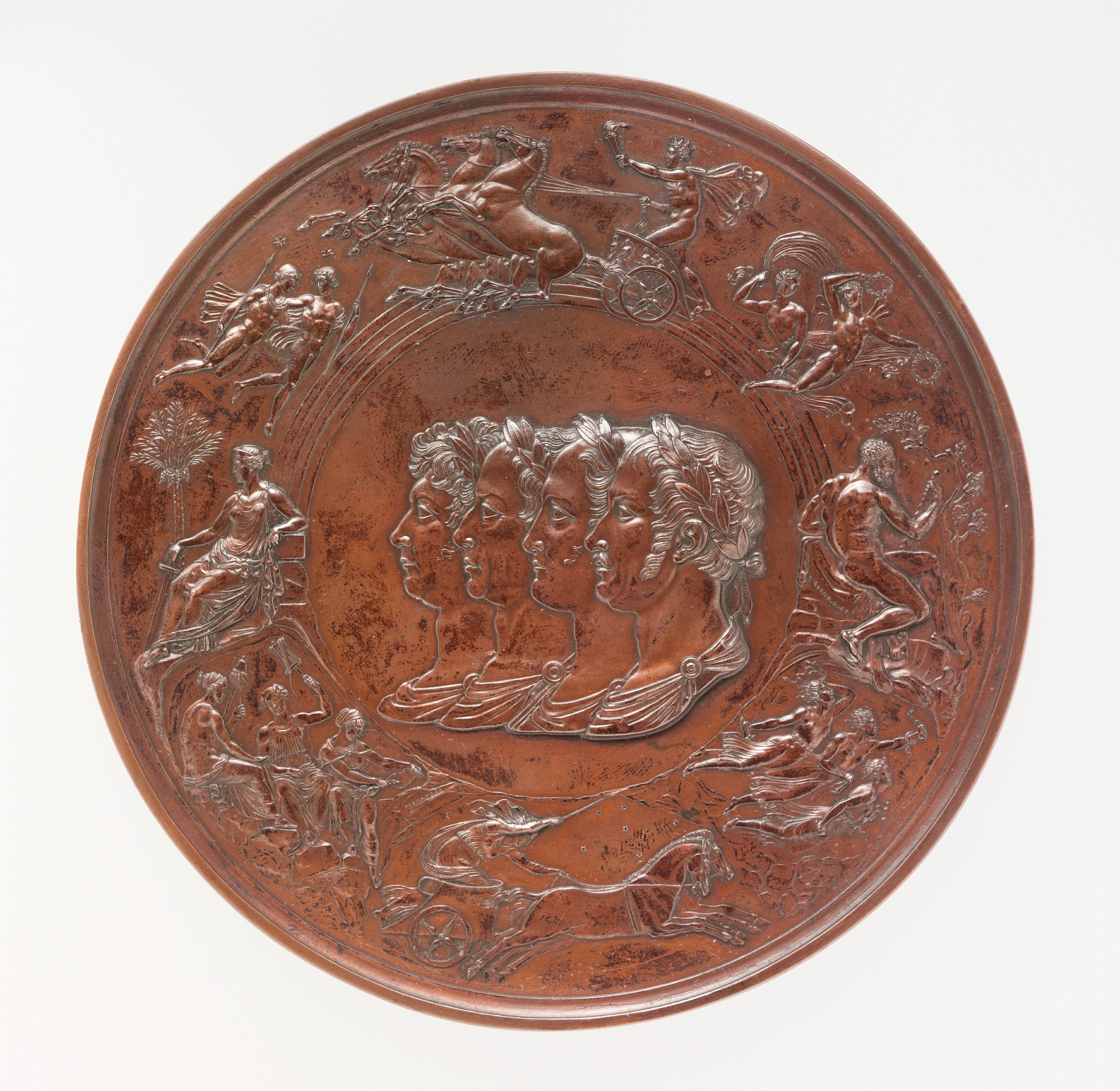
- Design: The four rulers of the nations triumphant at the Battle of Waterloo, surrounded by a mythological allegory evoking peace
- Designer: Benedetto Pistrucci
- Design date: 1849

Reverse
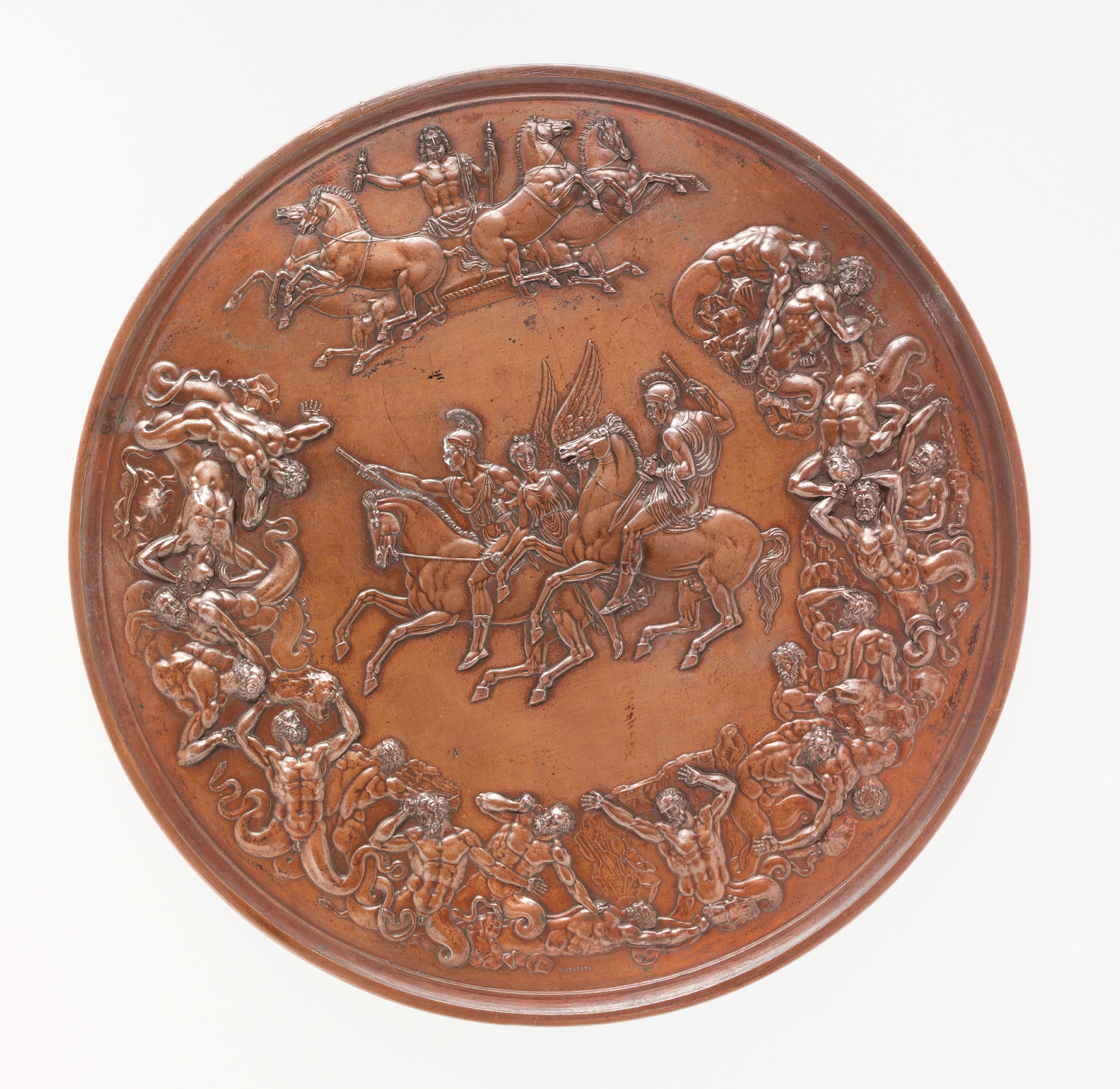
- Design: Equestrian figures of Wellington and Blücher surrounded by a design representing the defeat of the French
- Designer: Benedetto Pistrucci
- Design date: 1849

The Waterloo Medal was designed by Italian-born sculptor Benedetto Pistrucci. He worked on it from 1819 to 1849, when the completed matrices were presented to Britain's Royal Mint. The medal was commissioned by the British Government in 1819 on the instructions of the Prince Regent (later George IV); copies were to be presented to the generals who had been victorious in the 1815 Battle of Waterloo, and to the leaders of Britain's allies. As most of the intended recipients had died by 1849, and relations with France had improved, the medals were never struck, though modern-day editions have been made for sale to collectors.

In 1816, the Prince Regent had first suggested a medal to be presented to allies and commanders from Waterloo. The Royal Academy proposed work by John Flaxman, one of its members, but Pistrucci, whose responsibility it was to engrave the dies, refused to copy another's work, and brought forth designs of his own. The Prince Regent and William Wellesley-Pole, Master of the Mint were impressed by Pistrucci's models, and he gained the commission.

Pistrucci fell from grace at the Royal Mint in 1823 by refusing to copy another's work for the coinage, and he was instructed to concentrate on the medal. He likely concluded that he would be sacked if he completed it, and progress was extremely slow. Health issues also played a part. He stayed on at the Mint, the medal uncompleted, despite repeated calls from Masters of the Mint to finish the project. In 1844, the Master, W. E. Gladstone, reached an accord with Pistrucci and the medal matrices were eventually submitted in 1849. Due to their great size, 5.3 inches (130 mm) in diameter, the Mint was unwilling to risk damaging the matrices by hardening them, and only electrotypes and soft impressions were taken. Pistrucci's designs have been greatly praised by numismatic writers.

== Inception ==
On 28 June 1815, ten days after the Battle of Waterloo, the victorious general, the Duke of Wellington proposed to Frederick, Duke of York, that bronze medals be presented to the British soldiers at Waterloo, silver to their officers and gold to the sovereigns of the victorious nations, and to their generals and ministers. Wellington's brother was William Wellesley-Pole, the Master of the Mint, and Wellesley-Pole at once ordered designs prepared for the soldiers' medal. In early 1816, it was decided that officers and soldiers alike would receive their medal in silver, and it was produced in large numbers by the Royal Mint for the military. The Royal Academy was taxed with recommending a design for the gold medal; they selected a sketch by Sir John Flaxman, but no action was immediately taken.

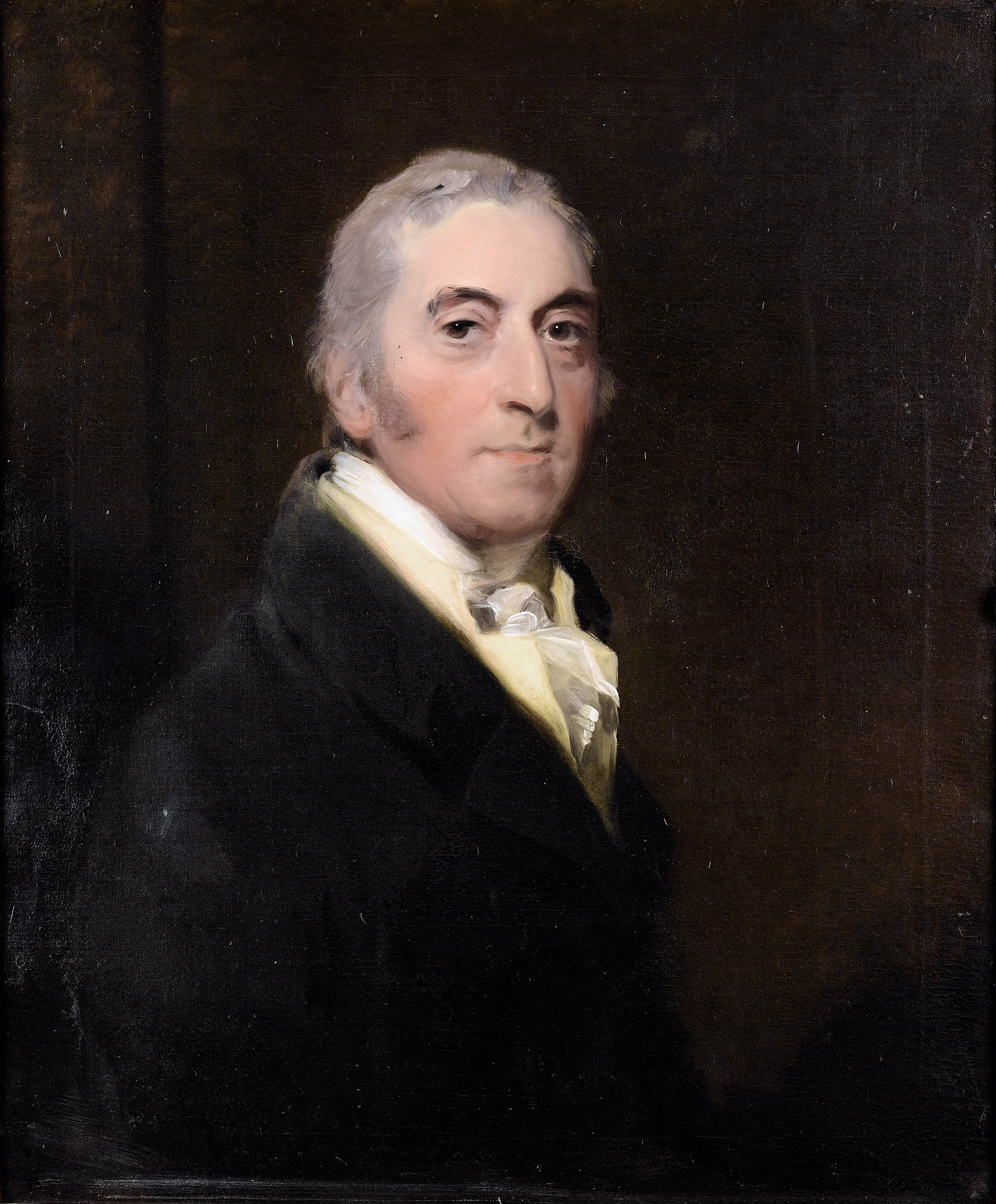
William Wellesley-Pole, by Thomas Lawrence

In 1816, George, Prince Regent (later George IV), pressed the idea of a commemorative medal to be presented to the victorious generals and national leaders of the Battle of Waterloo. It was decided to give this medal in gold to the heads of state and in silver to the victorious generals. Others to be honoured would receive the medal in bronze. Flaxman's design was to be used.

Wellesley-Pole in 1819 instructed Benedetto Pistrucci to engrave Flaxman's work to make steel dies for the medal. Pistrucci, an Italian who had come to Britain in 1815, was performing the duties of Chief Engraver of the Royal Mint. He believed he had been promised the title, which as a foreigner he was ineligible for, and this would be a longtime grievance for him. Pistrucci refused to engrave Flaxman's model, unwilling to copy the work of another artist. This refusal angered the Royal Academy. Pole instead asked Pistrucci to prepare a design of his own, and in a day he had produced wax models, about which the Prince Regent was enthusiastic. In August 1819, Pole received instructions from the Treasury to employ Pistrucci to produce the medal. The fee was £2,400, to be paid in instalments. Pole promised an advance that would allow Pistrucci to bring his family from Rome. According to Carlo Milano in his article on Pistrucci for the Royal Mint, "The Waterloo Medal could not be compared to any previous medal: it was much bigger and its iconography more complicated than had ever been seen before in the history of medallic art. But Pistrucci believed that it could be done and immediately began to work."

== Design ==
The centre of the obverse depicts the four allied rulers: George, Prince Regent (although not king, he was exercising the monarch's powers due to the illness of his father, George III), Emperor Francis I of Austria, Tsar Alexander I of Russia and King Frederick William III of Prussia.

Aside from the rulers, who are seen grouped in profile, Pistrucci's design for both sides is entirely allegorical, with the subject the treaty of peace concluded after Waterloo. At top of the obverse Apollo is seen in his chariot; he restores the day. Following the chariot are Zephyr, who scatters flowers, symbolic of peace, and Iris. The carriage flies in the sky towards Castor and Pollux, representing the constellation Gemini and symbolising the period of the Zodiac when Waterloo took place. The twins are armed with spears, and are meant as the apotheses of the victorious generals, Wellington and Blücher. Themis, the goddess of justice, appears before the rulers, a reminder that justice, more than power, secures their rule. Under her are seen the Fates, their subservient position meaning that human fate will henceforth be determined by justice. Opposite Themis, behind the rulers, is a man armed with a club, seated under an oak tree, he represents power. Beneath him are the Furies, symbolising that human actions and passions are subject to power, and at the bottom is a figure representing night, fleeing.

The reverse has at centre equestrian figures meant to be Wellington and Blücher, with Victory between them, guiding them to battle. They are in the Grecian style, similar to Pistrucci's earlier St George and the Dragon design for the sovereign coin. At the top of the reverse is Jupiter. Taking up the rest of the circumference of the medal are 19 figures of giants whom Jupiter has struck down; they are the defeated enemy and number one for every year of the war.

Pistrucci placed inscriptions on the wax model that he did not keep for the final version of the design. Above the royal heads was seen their countries, thus: ANGLIA (England) AUSTRIA RUSSIA PRUSSIA and below, FŒDERE JUNCTIS (Joint League). On the reverse he placed above and below the figures in the centre: WATERLOO and 18 JUNE 1815 (the date of the battle). These inscriptions were restored on the version of the medal struck by the Royal Mint in 2015 for the bicentenary of the battle.

== Delay ==
In 1822, Pole informed George (who had succeeded to the throne as George IV in 1820) that £1,700 had been paid to Pistrucci, and that the work on the dies was at an advanced stage. King George had strongly disliked the depiction of him Pistrucci had prepared for his coinage. Soon after this, he ordered a new one to be based on a portrait by Francis Chantrey, and Pistrucci refused the instructions to prepare the dies, again declining to copy the work of another artist. The resulting furore endangered his position, causing him to be excluded from further work on the coinage, and Pistrucci was instructed to concentrate on the Waterloo Medal. By 1826, part of one side had been completed. With Pistrucci's role at the Royal Mint now controversial, according to the Royal Mint Museum, "his progress was slow—and deliberately so since he feared that, having put himself beyond the pale by his obstinate behaviour, the Royal Mint would sever its association with him as soon as he handed over the dies."

The Weekly News inquire, "What has become of the celebrated Waterloo Medal die on which Signor Pistrucci has been employed at a salary of from £350 to £500 per annum, ever since the year 1815?" Who wouldn't turn meddler, when it is a business so liberally rewarded? Medlars, we believe, become very sleepy when kept long, but Signor Pistrucci must be the sleepiest medaller that ever hung to a Government branch. Not so sleepy either, when he has managed to pocket near upon £12,000 for one die, which one die is not even finished yet, after labour of thirty-four years! We begin to suspect that Signor Pistrucci's motto must be "Never say Die."

— "The sleepiest medlar on record", The Liverpool Mercury, 28 August 1849, p. 4.

According to Howard Linecar in his book on British coin designs and designers, "Pistrucci held the cutting of these dies [for the Waterloo Medal] as a bargaining counter in his relentless efforts to obtain the post of Chief Engraver at the Royal Mint". Pistrucci asked each new Master of the Mint for appointment to the position, until in 1828, amid Treasury concerns about how much money was being paid Pistrucci, he was made Chief Medallist, a new position, at a reduced salary; William Wyon became Chief Engraver. Milano wrote, "the Italian artist took this as an act of hostility by his enemies." At about this time, Pistrucci contracted an illness that affected his vision, slowing his work.

The net result was that little work was done on the Waterloo Medal. In 1832, the Master of the Mint, Lord Auckland, noted that the dies had been long delayed. In 1836, the new Master, Henry Labouchere, also complained about the delay, feeling the medal could be finished in 18 months. He offered Pistrucci extra payment if he would take on four apprentices and finish the Waterloo Medal. Pistrucci declined.

== Completion ==
I propose to call in person on Mr Sheil, Master of the Mint, for the purpose of presenting to him my respects on the 1st day of January next year 1849, and at the same time to place in his hands the two matrices of the great Waterloo Medal, given me to execute by the late Lord Maryborough (Note: The ennobled William Wellesley-Pole.) when Master of the Mint, and on which I have employed the same diligence and perseverance which I have given to the most finished works which have issued from my hands.

— Benedetto Pistrucci, 1848

In 1841, a new Master of the Mint, William Ewart Gladstone was appointed. Gladstone thought highly of Pistrucci and corresponded with him in Italian, but was unwilling to grant him any new commissions while the Waterloo Medal remained outstanding. By 1844, the continued expense of Pistrucci was a concern to the Audit Office. Gladstone restored cuts in Pistrucci's pay that had been made for failure to train an apprentice, and offered him a bonus of £400 to complete the medal. Pistrucci was to work solely on the one project. He vacated his home at the Royal Mint, moving to Old Windsor, where he set up a workshop to attempt the medal's completion. Although Pistrucci worked constantly on the medal during some periods, he was slowed by a fall in his cottage, which incapacitated him for much of 1846. On 1 January 1849, Pistrucci submitted the matrices of the medal to the Royal Mint, and was paid £1,500.

Pistrucci submitted a lengthy letter of advice to aid in hardening the steel of the matrices, with commentary on other matters interspersed; he had the letter published in the numismatic press. The matrices were each submitted in two pieces, a ring and core, and Pistrucci cautioned that successfully making dies from them was no certainty, "an accident produced by carelessness or inattention might in one moment entirely destroy the whole work, and without remedy". The matrices were 5.3 inches (130 mm) in diameter; Mint officials did not think they could be hardened and converted to dies without the likelihood of major damage. A few electrotypes were made from the matrices, along with some soft impressions, but no medals were struck. Improving relations between Britain and France made presentation of medals recalling Waterloo impolitic. Linecar noted that by then "all the great men to whom it was intended that a specimen of the medal should be given were dead, save only the Iron Duke".

Pistrucci was embittered by the experience. He stated in an 1850 letter to William Richard Hamilton:

I have nobody in the world to tell about my frustrations. It is not by chance that I put my name [on the Waterloo Medal] under the thread that the Fate is cutting. I knew that after the completion of the medal this would have happened. I have done more than my duty, the dishonest will have their triumph over me for a brief time, and I hope that one day their names will be covered in shame. My daughters are looking after the dies of the great medal from time to time to make sure that they don’t rust, I can swear that I have not looked at them for more than six months because I don’t have the strength of doing so. They have ruined my good health and they are the reason of all my troubles.

== Appraisal and later versions ==
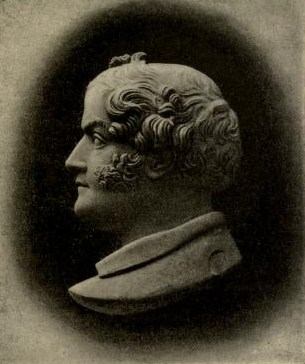
Cameo of Pistrucci (ca. 1850, by his daughter, Elisa)

Linecar said of the Waterloo Medal designs, "that they were one of the most magnificent examples of the die-sinker's art there can be no doubt". Roderick Farey, in his 2014 study of the artist, stated, "Pistrucci's genius is clearly apparent in the design". Milano summed up Pistrucci's matrices, still in the possession of the Royal Mint, as "undoubtedly among the finest pieces in the history of European medals, and a testimony to the genius of their creator". Hubert Elsassar of the Royal Mint deemed the medal, "the finest example of the art of a man whose skill has yet to be surpassed".

Pistrucci's biographer, Michael A. Marsh, described the medal as "the finest piece of intaglio work by any engraver". A spokesperson for the Royal Mint in the late 20th century praised the medal, "Pistrucci's design far excels anything ever attempted as regards the number of figures portrayed. Several of Pistrucci's wax models, including the definitive final versions, are held by the Museo della Zecca di Roma (the museum of the mint in Rome).

In 1990, the Royal Mint struck a reduced-size collector's version in bronze for the 175th anniversary of the battle, with the piece offered in bronze, sterling silver and in 9-carat gold. It struck one in silver, also for collectors, for the 200th anniversary in 2015, with Pistrucci's inscriptions from the wax models restored. In 2014, as part of the preparations for the battle's bicentenary, the Worcestershire Medal Service (Queen Elizabeth II's official medallist), on behalf of the London Mint Office (part of the Samlerhuset Group) prepared full-size versions in silver. They were presented to the ambassadors of Austria, Russia and Germany (as successor to Prussia), with Elizabeth to receive one later, and were also made available for sale to the public at £3,900 each. Sir Evelyn Webb-Carter, chairman of the Waterloo 200 Committee described the medal, weighing 4.5 pounds (2.0 kg), as a "thumping great thing".

== Bibliography ==
- Craig, John (2010) [1953]. The Mint (paperback ed.). Cambridge, United Kingdom: Cambridge University Press. ISBN 978-0-521-17077-2.
- Farey, Roderick (September 2014). "Benedetto Pistrucci (1782–1855), Part 1". Coin News: 51–53.
- Farey, Roderick (October 2014). "Benedetto Pistrucci (1782–1855), Part 2". Coin News: 51–52.
- Farmer, Ben (11 November 2014). "Britain's Waterloo allies awarded medals – 199 years late". The Telegraph. Archived from the original on 15 November 2014.
- Linecar, H.W.A. (1977). British Coin Designs and Designers. London: G. Bell & Sons Ltd. ISBN 978-0-7135-1931-0.
- Marsh, Michael A. (1996). Benedetto Pistrucci: Principal Engraver and Chief Medallist of the Royal Mint, 1783–1855. Hardwick, Cambridgeshire: Michael A. Marsh (Publications). ISBN 978-0-9506929-2-0.
- Milano, Carlo. "The Talent and the Temperament". Royal Mint Museum. Archived from the original on 11 May 2018.
