= Distinguished Conduct Medal (Natal) =

Military decoration for bravery in Natal

- Type: Military decoration for bravery
- Awarded for: Gallantry in the field
- Country: Colony of Natal
- Presented by: the Monarch of the United Kingdom and the British Dominions, and Emperor of India
- Eligibility: Other Ranks
- Post-nominals: DCM
- Status: Discontinued in 1913
- Established: 1897

Highlights
- Total: 10
- Ribbon bar

Order of Wear
- Next (higher): Union of South Africa Queen's Medal for Bravery, Gold
- Equivalent: Distinguished Conduct Medal
- Next (lower): Conspicuous Gallantry Medal
- Related: Distinguished Service Order

In 1895, Queen Victoria authorised Colonial governments to adopt various British military decorations and medals and to award them to their local military forces. The Colony of Natal introduced this system in August 1895 and, in 1897, instituted the Distinguished Conduct Medal (Natal), post-nominal letters DCM.

== Origin ==
The Distinguished Conduct Medal was instituted by Queen Victoria in 1854, during the Crimean War, as a decoration for gallantry in the field by other ranks of the British Army. The medal could also be awarded to non-commissioned military personnel of the British Dominions and Colonies.

For all ranks below commissioned officer, the Distinguished Conduct Medal was the second highest award for gallantry in action after the Victoria Cross, and the other ranks' equivalent of the Distinguished Service Order, awarded to commissioned officers. Recipients of the Distinguished Conduct Medal are entitled to the post-nominal letters DCM.

== Natal Colonial Forces ==
In the late 19th century, the Colony of Natal's armed forces consisted of the para-military Natal Police and a military Volunteer Force. The Volunteer Force was reorganised as the Natal Militia in 1904 and, in 1908, the Natal Police and Natal Militia were amalgamated to form the Natal Colonial Forces.

== Institution ==
On 31 May 1895, Queen Victoria authorised Dominion and Colonial governments to adopt various military medals and to award them to their local military forces. The Colony of Natal introduced this system in August 1895. In 1897, the Distinguished Conduct Medal (Natal) was one of three known decorations and medals which were instituted by Natal under this authority.

The Natal medal remained current even after Natal became a Province of the Union of South Africa in 1910, until the first medals for the Union Defence Forces were introduced in June 1913.

== Order of wear ==
In the order of wear prescribed by the British Central Chancery of the Orders of Knighthood, the Distinguished Conduct Medal (Natal) ranks on par with the Distinguished Conduct Medal. It takes precedence after the Union of South Africa Queen's Medal for Bravery, Gold (a civilian honour) and before the Conspicuous Gallantry Medal.

=== South Africa ===
On 6 April 1952 the Union of South Africa instituted its own range of military decorations and medals. These new awards were worn before all earlier British decorations and medals awarded to South Africans, with the exception of the Victoria Cross, which still took precedence before all other awards. Of the official British medals applicable to South Africans, the Natal DCM took precedence after the Air Force Cross.

- Preceded by the Air Force Cross.
- Succeeded by the Conspicuous Gallantry Medal.

== Description ==
The medal was struck in silver and is a disk, 36 millimetres (1.42 inches) in diameter and 3 millimetres (0.12 inches) thick. The suspender is an ornamented scroll pattern, affixed to the medal by means of a claw and a pin through the upper edge of the medal.

Obverse

The original Victorian obverse of the British Distinguished Conduct Medal shows a Trophy of Arms incorporating a central shield bearing the Royal Coat of Arms. From 1902, after the accession of King Edward VII, his effigy with the inscription "EDWARDVS VII REX IMPERATOR" around the perimeter replaced the trophy of arms.

Reverse

The reverse is smooth, with a raised rim, and bears the inscriptions "NATAL" in a curved line at the top and "FOR DISTINGUISHED CONDUCT IN THE FIELD" in four straight lines in the centre. The inscriptions are underlined by a small laurel wreath between two spear blades.

Ribbon

The ribbon is identical to that of the British Distinguished Conduct Medal, 32 millimetres wide and crimson, with a 10 millimetres wide Navy blue band in the centre.

== Recipients ==
Of the four Colonies which were to form the Union of South Africa in 1910, the Cape of Good Hope, Colony of Natal and Transvaal Colony adopted their own territorial versions of the Distinguished Conduct Medal. Of these, only Natal actually awarded the medal, with ten awards made, one in 1901 for the Second Boer War (with the trophy of arms obverse) and nine for the Zulu Rebellion of 1906 (with Edward VII's effigy on the obverse). In June 1913 the Union of South Africa instituted its own version of the DCM, but this was never awarded, with members of the Union Defence Forces awarded the British version during the two World Wars.
