= Chief Medallist of the Royal Mint =

Senior position at the British Royal Mint

Chief Medallist of the Royal Mint was a senior position at the British Royal Mint responsible for the overseeing of medal production. Historically the position was created in 1828 as a compromise to allow Italian engraver Benedetto Pistrucci to be more involved in the mint's engraving process without becoming the Mint's chief engraver. Being a foreign born Italian, appointment of Pistrucci to the prestigious role of Chief Engraver would have proved too scandalous and therefore despite performing the duties of chief engraver he was awarded the title of Chief Medallist. The role of Chief Engraver previously held by Thomas Wyon was awarded to his cousin William Wyon who along with Pistrucci were required to share the wages of both the Chief Engraver and second engraver, much to their disliking. In his role of Chief Medallist, Pistrucci was left feeling bitter at the injustice against him, producing little work of note apart from his Waterloo Medal.
