= Benedetto Pistrucci =

Italian engraver (1783–1855)

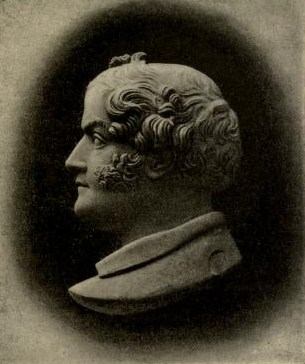
Cameo of Pistrucci (ca. 1850, by his daughter, Elisa)

Benedetto Pistrucci (29 May 1783 – 16 September 1855) was an Italian gem-engraver, medallist and a coin engraver, probably best known for his Saint George and the Dragon design for the British sovereign coin. Pistrucci was commissioned by the British government to create the large Waterloo Medal, a project which took him thirty years to complete.

Born in Rome in 1783, Pistrucci studied briefly with other artists before striking out on his own at age 15. He became prominent as a cameo carver and was patronised by royalty. In 1815, he moved to Britain, where he would live for most of the rest of his life. His talent brought him to the attention of notables including William Wellesley-Pole, the Master of the Mint. Pole engaged Pistrucci to design new coinage, including the sovereign, which was first issued in 1817 to mixed reactions. Although Pole probably promised Pistrucci the post of Chief Engraver, the position could not be awarded as only a British subject could hold it. This slight became a long-term grievance for Pistrucci.

Talented but temperamental, Pistrucci refused to copy the work of other artists. When in 1823 George IV demanded that an unflattering portrait of him on the coinage be changed with a new likeness to be based on the work of Francis Chantrey, Pistrucci refused and was nearly dismissed. The Mint did not dismiss him, lest the money already spent on the Waterloo Medal be wasted. Pistrucci kept his place with the Mint for the rest of his life, eventually completing the Waterloo Medal in 1849, though because of its great size it could not be struck. After Pistrucci's death, the George and Dragon design was restored to the sovereign coin, and is still used today.

== Early life and career (1783–1815) ==
Benedetto Pistrucci was born in Rome on 29 May 1783, second child and son of Federico Pistrucci, Senior Judge of the High Criminal Court under the papal government, and Antonia (née Greco). His elder brother Filippo displayed artistic tendencies from a young age, but Benedetto showed mainly a disinclination to study. Federico Pistrucci wanted his sons to follow in his footsteps and sent them to Latin schools. Benedetto began his education in Bologna, where the family had property, but the Pistrucci family was forced to move to Rome in 1794 when Napoleon invaded Italy, and the boys were enrolled in the Roman College.

Napoleon had put a price on Federico Pistrucci's head, as he had prosecuted Bonapartist rebels, so the family fled Rome when the French advanced towards it, stopping in Frosinone, where the boys were again put into an academic school. Filippo satisfied his father with enough academic achievement that he was allowed to take a job with a painter named Mango. Deprived of his brother, Benedetto became despondent and was eventually allowed to work at Mango's. There, he quickly displayed his artistic talent. Mango told Benedetto of his brother Giuseppe Mango, a cameo engraver in Rome. With the Pope and the French having made peace, the family was able to return there, and Benedetto Pistrucci began his training as a cameo carver. He advanced quickly, also taking lessons from Stefano Tofanelli, and soon Giuseppe Mango was selling Pistrucci's carvings as his own. Realising that his works were being sold as counterfeit antiques, Pistrucci began placing a secret mark, the Greek letter λ (lambda) on his creations.

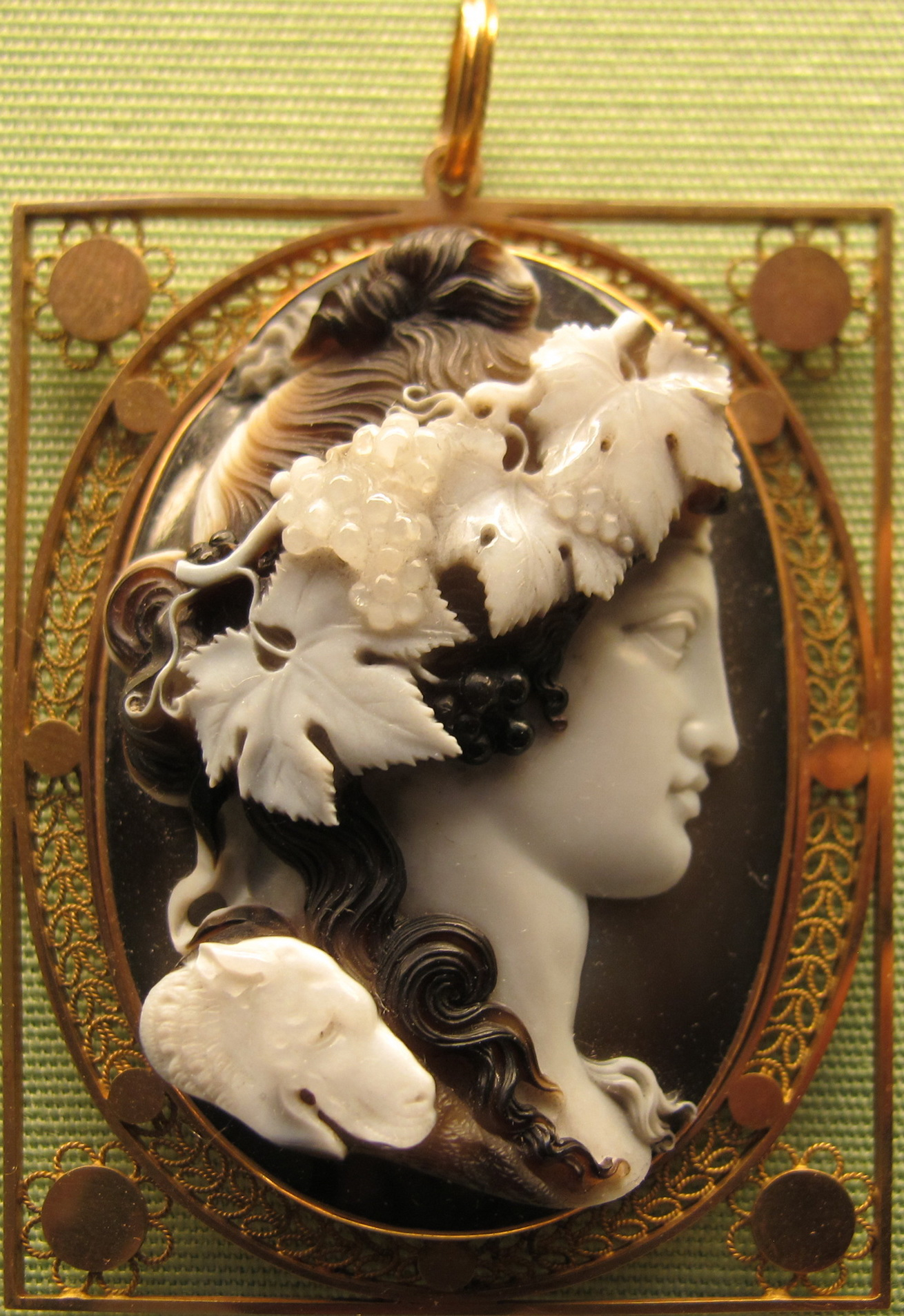
A Pistrucci cameo (1800)

Pistrucci's obvious talent made his fellow apprentices envious, and one provoked a fight with him, stabbing him in the abdomen before Pistrucci fended off the attack. Recovering at home, he taught himself to model with wax. Federico Pistrucci decided his son would be better off with a new master, and secured a position for him with Giuseppe Cerbara, but the boy refused, believing that he would have to work in poor conditions. A place with gem-carver Nicolo Morelli was secured, and Pistrucci also attended the scuola del nudo art academy at the Campidoglio, where in 1800 he took the first prize for sculpture. Pistrucci felt Morelli was seeking to profit from his ability while giving him little training, and left his position at the age of 15, working from the family home. He was able to pay rent, as from the beginning he had ample commissions for cameos.

Pistrucci's early clients included two of Rome's major art dealers, Ignazio Vescovali and Angelo Bonelli, and Napoleon's three sisters, Elisa, Pauline and Caroline. Pistrucci gained prominence by winning a competition to make a cameo of Elisa (the Grand Duchess of Tuscany), working nearly nonstop for eight days to complete it. The Grand Duchess was so impressed by his work that she gave him studio space at her palace. Pistrucci felt secure enough with this patronage that in 1802, he married Barbara Folchi, daughter of a well-to-do merchant; they had nine children together. He continued working in Rome, turning out portrait cameos and engraved gems, until 1814.

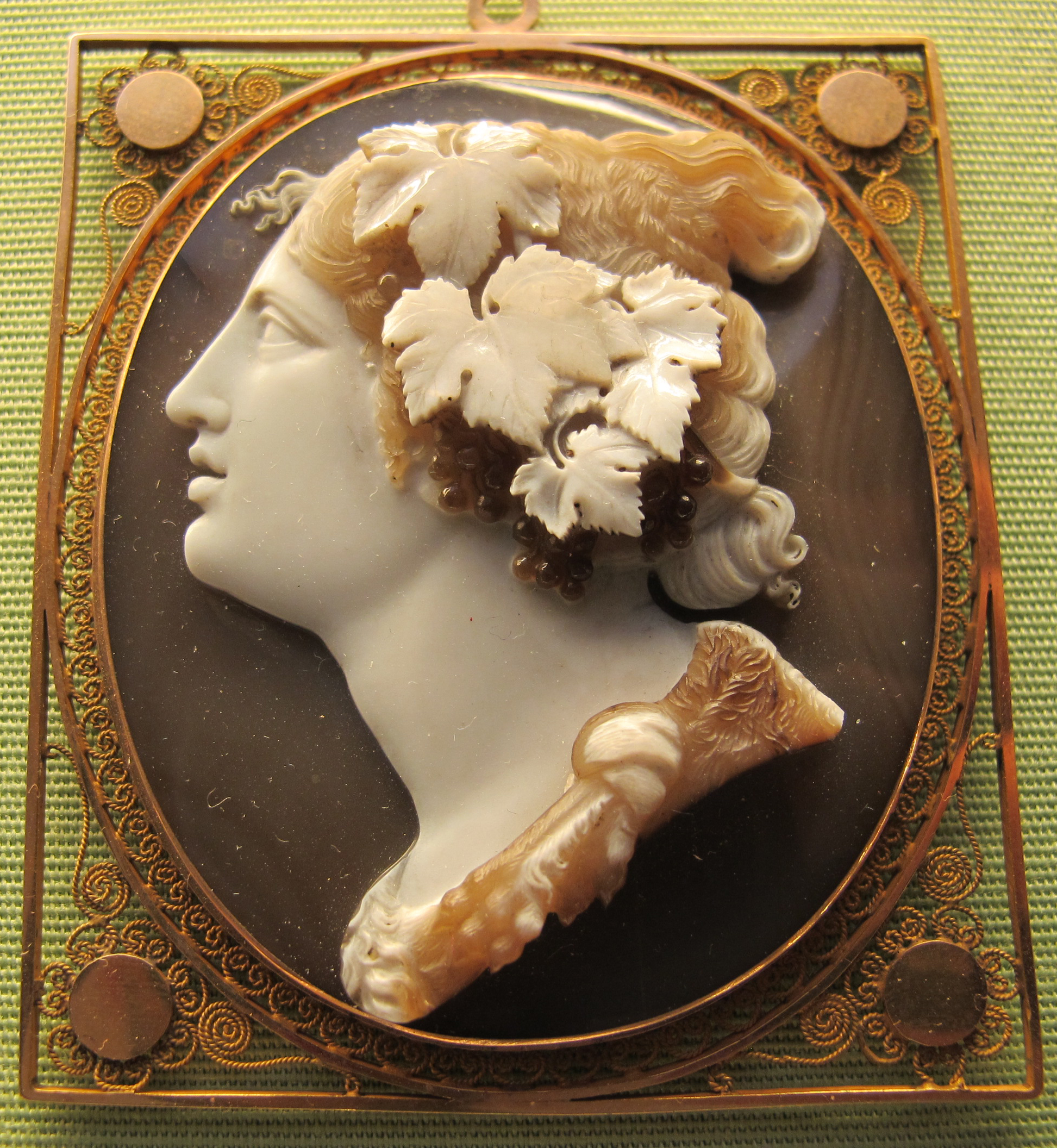
Cameo, 1810

Bonelli returned from a successful trip to Britain in 1814 and proposed that Pistrucci go back with him, arguing that the artist's future was there. Pistrucci was willing, and after making provision for his family left Rome with Bonelli. They first stopped in Perugia so that Pistrucci could say farewell to his brother Filippo, but found him willing to accompany them. By Turin, Filippo Pistrucci had decided that Bonelli was not to be trusted, and so informed his brother. When they reached Paris in December 1814, the brothers refused to accompany Bonelli further, and after making threats, the dealer departed. Filippo soon returned to Italy, but Benedetto Pistrucci found his name and art were known in Paris, and set to work. He was there when Napoleon returned from Elba, beginning the Hundred Days, but worked on, unaffected by the war. He saw Napoleon in a garden, and always having a ball of wax with him, quietly modelled the emperor, the last portrait of him done in Europe. After the Battle of Waterloo in June 1815, Pistrucci began preparations to move on to Britain, but it was not until 31 December that he arrived there.

== Rise to prominence (1815–1819) ==
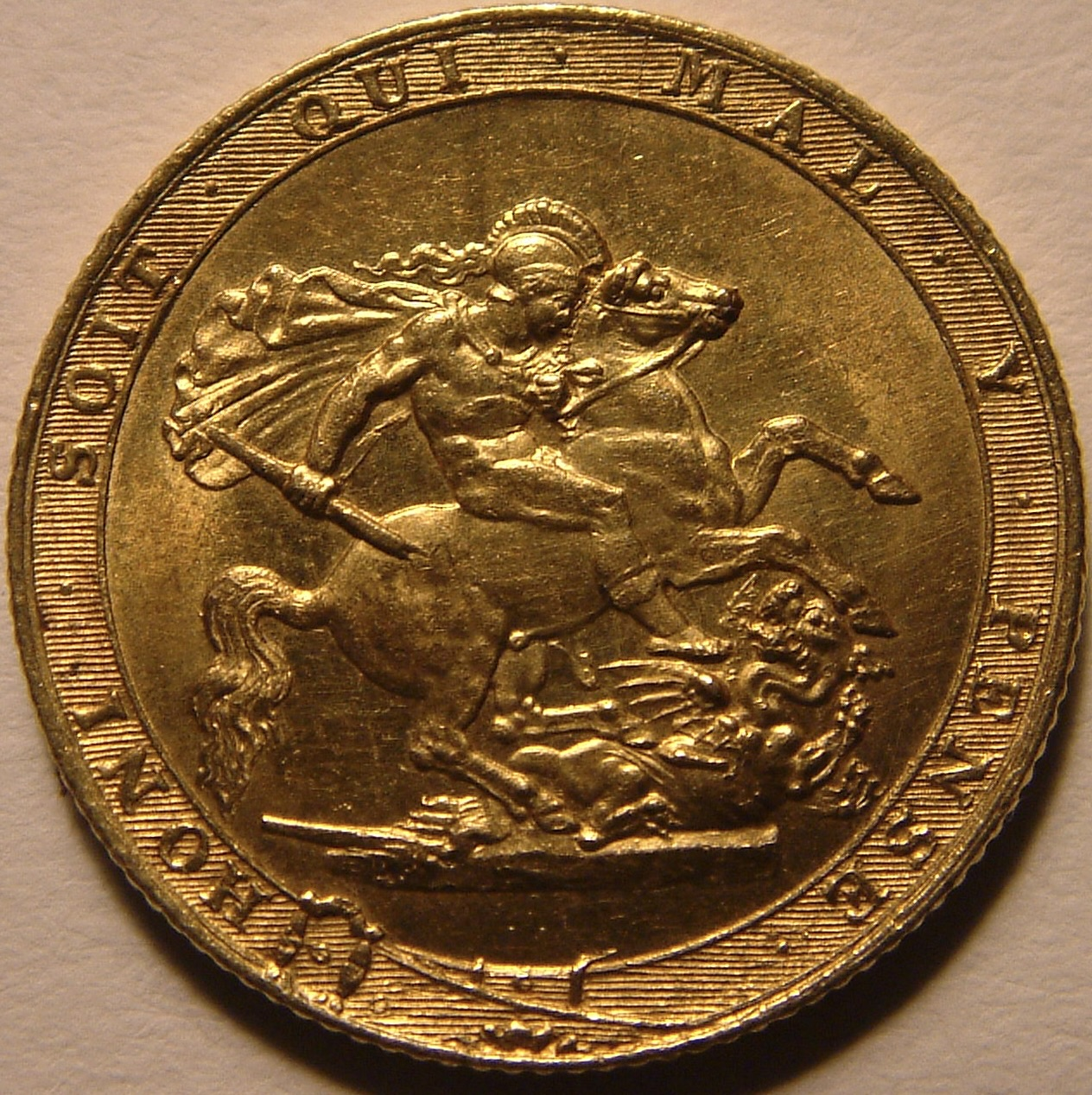
Reverse of the 1817 sovereign

On arrival at Dover, Pistrucci had difficulty with Customs, possibly caused by Bonelli's malice. Once he was able to, he journeyed to London. He had letters of introduction to several people, and Charles Konig, Keeper of Minerals at the British Museum, proved a loyal friend. Through Konig, Pistrucci met the famous naturalist, Sir Joseph Banks, who commissioned the artist to do a portrait of him. While Banks was sitting for Pistrucci, the connoisseur Richard Payne Knight came by, anxious to show Sir Joseph a cameo fragment he had purchased, and which he dated to Ancient Greece. After Banks praised it highly, Pistrucci, on examining it, identified it as his own work, displaying the secret mark he had placed on it. The incident increased Pistrucci's reputation in London.

Pistrucci was introduced to Lord and Lady Spencer by Banks. Lady Spencer showed Pistrucci a model of Saint George and the Dragon by Nathaniel Marchant and commissioned him to reproduce it in the Greek style as part of her husband's regalia as a Knight of the Garter. Pistrucci had already been thinking of such a work, and he produced the cameo. The model for the saint was an Italian waiter at Brunet's Hotel in Leicester Square, where he had stayed after coming to London.

Sir Joseph commissioned Pistrucci to craft a cameo of King George III. As the King was ill with porphyria, Pistrucci modelled the likeness from Marchant's three-shilling bank token, and cut it in red jasper for a fee of 50 guineas. Banks showed the cameo to William Wellesley-Pole, elder brother of the Duke of Wellington and the Master of the Mint, who was greatly impressed by the quality of what he saw. At this time, the Royal Mint was preparing to issue new gold and silver coins as part of the Great Recoinage of 1816, and in June of that year, Pole decided to hire Pistrucci to make models in stone for the new coinage that could be converted into steel dies by the Mint's engravers.

Pole had Pistrucci create three portraits of the King in different sizes. Only two were used, one for the obverse of the half crown, and the other for the shilling and sixpence. Both were modified by Thomas Wyon of the Mint, who engraved the designs in steel. What was dubbed the "bull head" of the King on the 1816 half crown was disliked by the public, and it was replaced by another in 1817. The criticism incensed Pistrucci, who blamed Wyon for bungling the design, and who set about learning to engrave in steel himself.

After completing Lady Spencer's commission, by most accounts, Pistrucci suggested to Pole that an appropriate subject for the sovereign, a new gold coin equal to one pound that was to be struck, would be Saint George. Until the early 20th century, gold coins were struck for circulation, rather than as bullion pieces. Kevin Clancy, in his volume on the history of the sovereign coin, doubted whether the Spencer commission was truly the inspiration for the George and Dragon design which that coin has long featured, and that the idea might not even have come from Pistrucci. Clancy argued that such motifs were common at the time and that the story originated with Pistrucci, whom he deemed an unreliable witness on his own past.

For a fee of 100 guineas (£105), Pistrucci created the sovereign's design, engraving it himself. He depicted the saint atop a fiery steed which is trampling the wounded dragon. George has a broken spear in his hand; part is in the dragon and another fragment lies on the ground. Pistrucci's original design, used for circulation in 1817–1819 and reprised by the Royal Mint in 2017, has the ribbon of the Order of the Garter surrounding the George and dragon design, with its motto HONI SOIT QUI MAL Y PENSE. The design, with Saint George bearing a sword rather than a spear, is ordinarily seen on the sovereign, and was also used for the crown from 1818. Clancy noted of the design process for the crown, "what emerges is the presence of Pole at each turn. He bombarded the young artist with suggestions and instructions on how the design should be changed from the shape of the sword to the perceived ferocity of the dragon." Pistrucci had placed his full last name on both sides of the crown, for which he was criticised by the public, and some said the saint would surely fall off his horse with the next blow.

After the death in 1817 of Thomas Wyon Sr, the father of the man who had adapted Pistrucci's designs, Pole most probably offered Pistrucci the post of chief engraver at the Royal Mint, with a salary of £500 per annum. and a house within the grounds of the Mint. However, it soon appeared that a law passed under William III barred foreigners from the post, and so Pole left it vacant, while granting Pistrucci the salary and emoluments of the office. Sir John Craig wrote in his history of the Royal Mint: "The arrangement was not put into writing, and misunderstanding was easy for a foreigner. Pole categorically denied any commitment beyond the grant for the time being of a salary for coinage designs as cheaper than payment of fees. The Italian persistently contended that he was seduced into Mint service by a promise of formal appointment to the chief engravership". According to H.W.A. Linecar in his book on British coin designs and designers, "the arrangement might have worked very well, even though it was against accepted procedure, had Pistrucci been other than he was."

In 1819, Pistrucci was awarded the commission to design the Waterloo Medal, a huge piece some 5.3 inches (130 mm) in diameter that the government planned to award to the victorious generals and national leaders who had defeated Napoleon. Such a medal had been proposed by the Prince Regent (later George IV) soon after the battle. Pistrucci's price was £2,400, and the down payment allowed him to bring his family from Italy. The medal was originally supposed to be a design by John Flaxman, but Pistrucci refused to engrave the work of another artist, and Pole allowed him to design his own medal, a decision that antagonised London's art establishment against Pistrucci. A gigantic undertaking, the medal would take Pistrucci 30 years to complete.

== Conflict at the Mint (1820–1836) ==
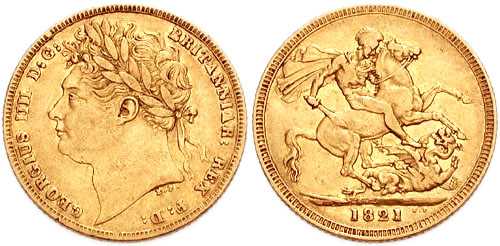
A George IV sovereign, with the head so disliked by the King

After the death of George III in 1820, Pistrucci prepared the coinage bust of the new King, George IV. The King despised Pistrucci's work for its bloated expression—according to Clancy, "its full features implying something of the appetites of the monarch". The King and Pistrucci also came into conflict over the Coronation medal, with the King objecting to being placed on the same level as the allegorical representations of his kingdoms. Pistrucci stated, "I shall elevate His Majesty", and did so. The King's toupee also caused difficulty in the engraving process. On the coinage, the sovereign was modified to remove its garter, and the saint's broken spear was replaced by a sword. Thus, it became very similar to the design used on modern-day sovereigns but for the lack of a streamer on Saint George's helmet. This version of the reverse was struck from 1821 to 1825, (Note: And again from 2009.) but Pistrucci's design would be thereafter absent from the sovereign from 1825 to 1874, after his death.

Aware of King George's dissatisfaction with the coinage effigy, the Mint played for time. Pole's resignation in 1823 deprived Pistrucci of a friend and supporter at the Mint. Sculptor Francis Chantrey had prepared a bust of the King which the monarch liked, and ordered that it be placed on the coinage. Pistrucci would not copy the work of another artist, and refused. The new coinage of 1823–1825 was engraved by Pistrucci's assistant, Jean Baptiste Merlen, and by William Wyon; Pistrucci was thereafter excluded from work on the coinage. The Mint considered sacking Pistrucci, but realised that if it did, the £1,700 advanced for fees and expenses on the Waterloo medal would probably be wasted, and he kept his position and pay on condition he focused on the completion of the medal. Despite this, by 1826, only a portion of one side had been completed. Though the banishment of the George and Dragon design from the sovereign after 1825 was more part of a general redesign of the coinage than an attack upon Pistrucci, according to Clancy he "cannot have masked the sense he must have felt of tides turning against him".

There was conflict at the Mint between Pistrucci and William Wyon, that sometimes involved Merlen. According to Graham Pollard in the Oxford Dictionary of National Biography, "Pistrucci's temperament did not foster good relations with his colleagues at the mint; the insecurity of his position there was deepened by a spasmodic but bitter campaign conducted through the newspapers by his partisans and those of William Wyon." Pistrucci appealed to each new Master of the Mint for appointment to the post of chief engraver. In 1828, the incumbent Master, George Tierney, worked a compromise that satisfied no one. Wyon was appointed as chief engraver, and Pistrucci as chief medallist, with the salaries of the top two engraving positions divided between them. Of Pistrucci's salary of £350, £50 was conditional on his training an apprentice. Pistrucci in succession named two of his sons, but the allowance was stopped after 1830 as it had come to light that each resided abroad, and one was not a British subject and so was ineligible for regular Mint employment. Pistrucci's understanding of the arrangement was that he would create such medals as might be ordered by government departments, with each medal a separate fee in addition to the annual salary.

This effectively left Pistrucci with little to do at the Mint. He created several medallic works, for example, a small memorial medal for the King's brother, Frederick, Duke of York in 1827 that was popular, in royal circles, mounted in rings. He was asked to design the Coronation medal after King William IV came to the throne on George's death in 1830, but declined as he was asked to copy a bust by Chantrey, and the King refused to sit for him. He created, in 1830–1831, the Army Long Service and Good Conduct Medal, the first non-campaign medal of the British Army. He took twelve months to do so, a period of time Craig found unduly long. He continued to cut cameos, and to work, slowly, on the Waterloo Medal. Pistrucci's biographer, Michael A. March, tied his disinclination to work on the Waterloo Medal to his unhappiness about his position at the Mint, and he may have concluded that he would be sacked if he finished the medal. In 1836, the new Master, Henry Labouchere, stated that he felt the medal could be finished in 18 months, and offered Pistrucci payment if he would take on four apprentices and finish it. Pistrucci declined.

== Later career and death (1837–1855) ==
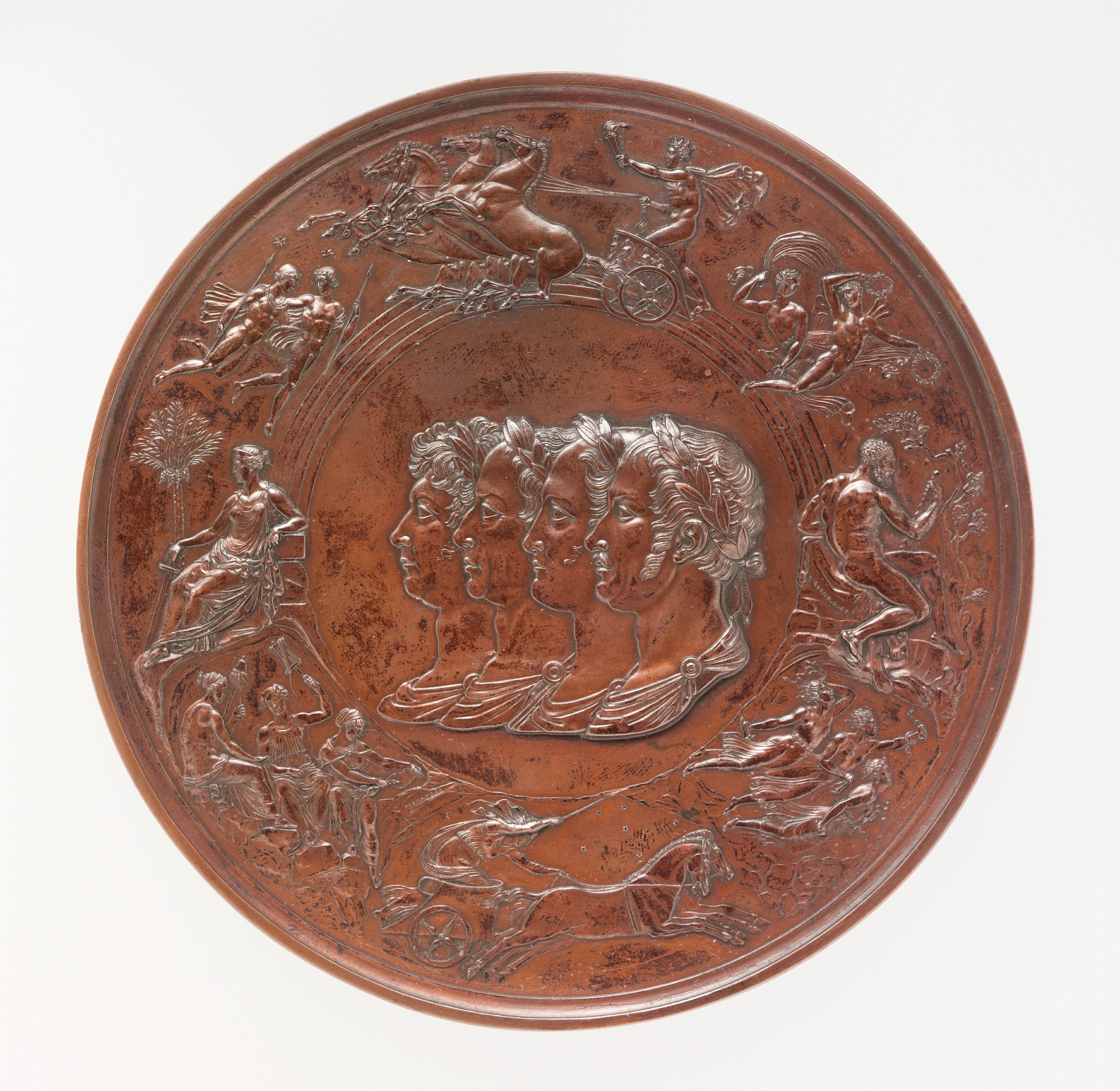

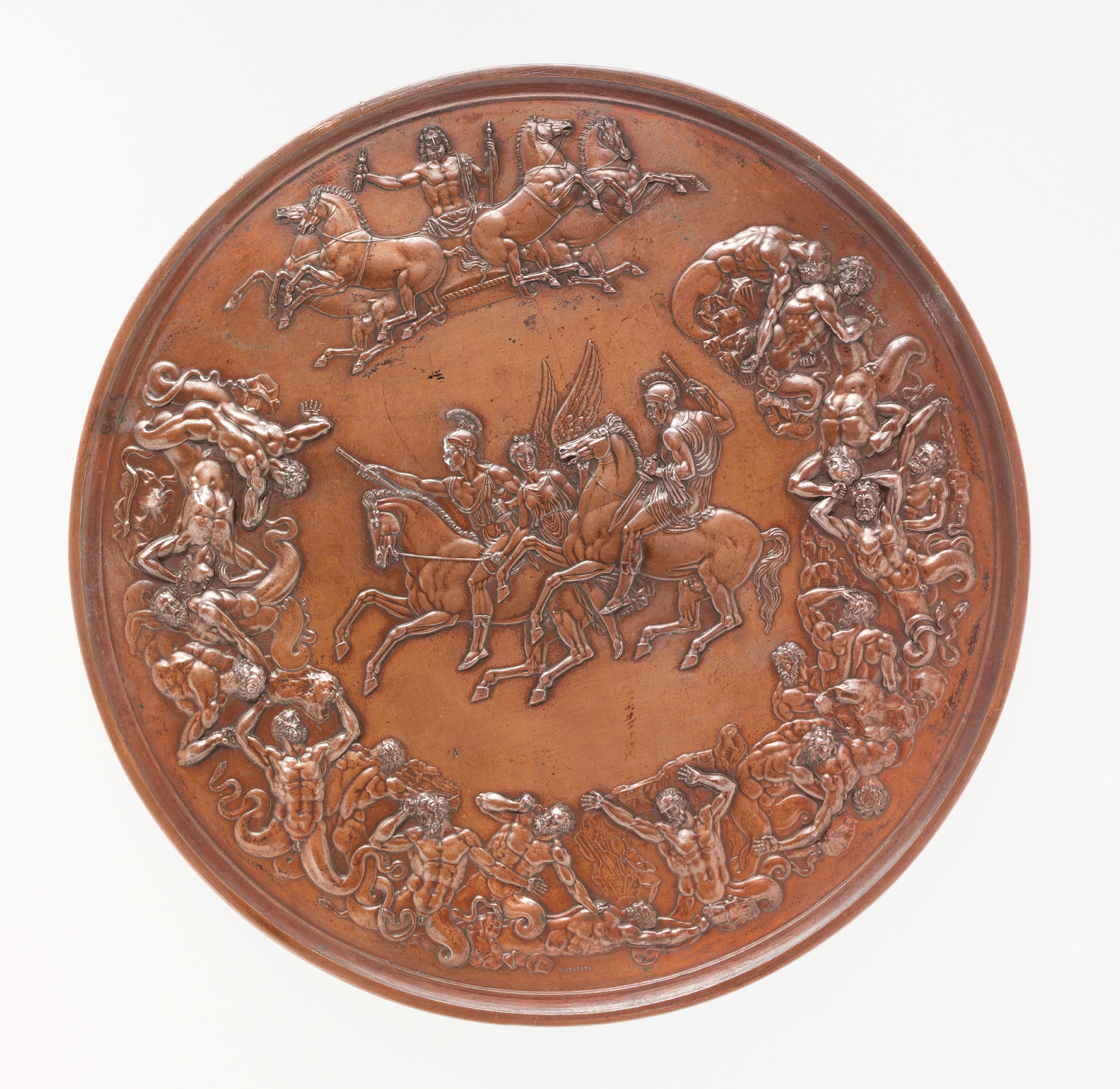
The Waterloo Medal

Pistrucci enjoyed a friendly relationship with Princess Victoria of Kent, the niece and heiress presumptive of King William, and cut several cameos of her. After she succeeded to the throne as Queen Victoria in 1837, Pistrucci was selected to sculpt her Coronation medal, which he did; the Queen granted him several sittings. Although the Queen was pleased, there were mixed reviews. When questions were asked in the House of Commons, Labouchere stated that Pistrucci may have been ill. Joseph Hume opined that the reverse was no better done than the cheap medals sold in the streets for a penny each. In 1838, Pistrucci made the silver seal of the Duchy of Lancaster, using a new process by which the punch or die could be cast in metal directly from the original wax or clay mould, rather than having to be copied by hand engraving. The following year, Pistrucci left for Rome to take up a position as chief engraver at the papal mint, but returned to London a few months later, deeming the salary too low.

By the early 1840s, the Audit Office was questioning the amount spent on Pistrucci. In 1844, the Master of the Mint, William Gladstone restored Pistrucci's salary to the full £350 and offered him £400 to complete the Waterloo Medal. Pistrucci moved his residence from the Mint on Tower Hill to Fine Arts Cottage, Old Windsor, and set to work in full earnest. He was slowed by injuries from a fall, and it was not until the beginning of 1849 that he submitted the matrices of the medal, and was paid the remaining balance of £1,500. The matrices were so large no one at the Royal Mint was willing to take the risk of hardening them and possibly ruining three decades' work. So only soft impressions were taken, with no medals in gold, silver and bronze as intended, though replicas have since been minted from other dies. Even if the government had struck the medals, there was almost no one to present them to, for of the intended recipients, all were dead but the Duke of Wellington.

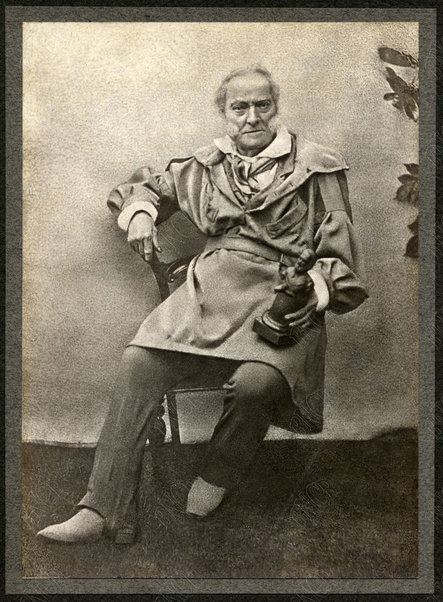
Photograph of Benedetto Pistrucci

The conflict between Pistrucci and William Wyon continued into the late 1840s, and was sometimes featured in the press, contributing to the feeling that all was not well at the Mint. A Royal Commission on reform of the Royal Mint was appointed in 1848. Pistrucci submitted a report, in which he settled some old scores. The reforms abolished the positions of chief engraver (Wyon died in 1851) and chief medallist, with Pistrucci appointed a modeller and engraver to the Mint, to receive a salary in addition to payment for any work done.

Pistrucci in 1850 moved from Old Windsor to Flora Lodge, Englefield Green, near Windsor, where he lived with his daughters Maria Elisa and Elena, both gem engravers. He continued to accept private commissions for cameos and medals. Pistrucci died there of "inflammation of the lungs", on 16 September 1855, and is buried at Christ Church, Virginia Water, Surrey.

== Appraisal ==
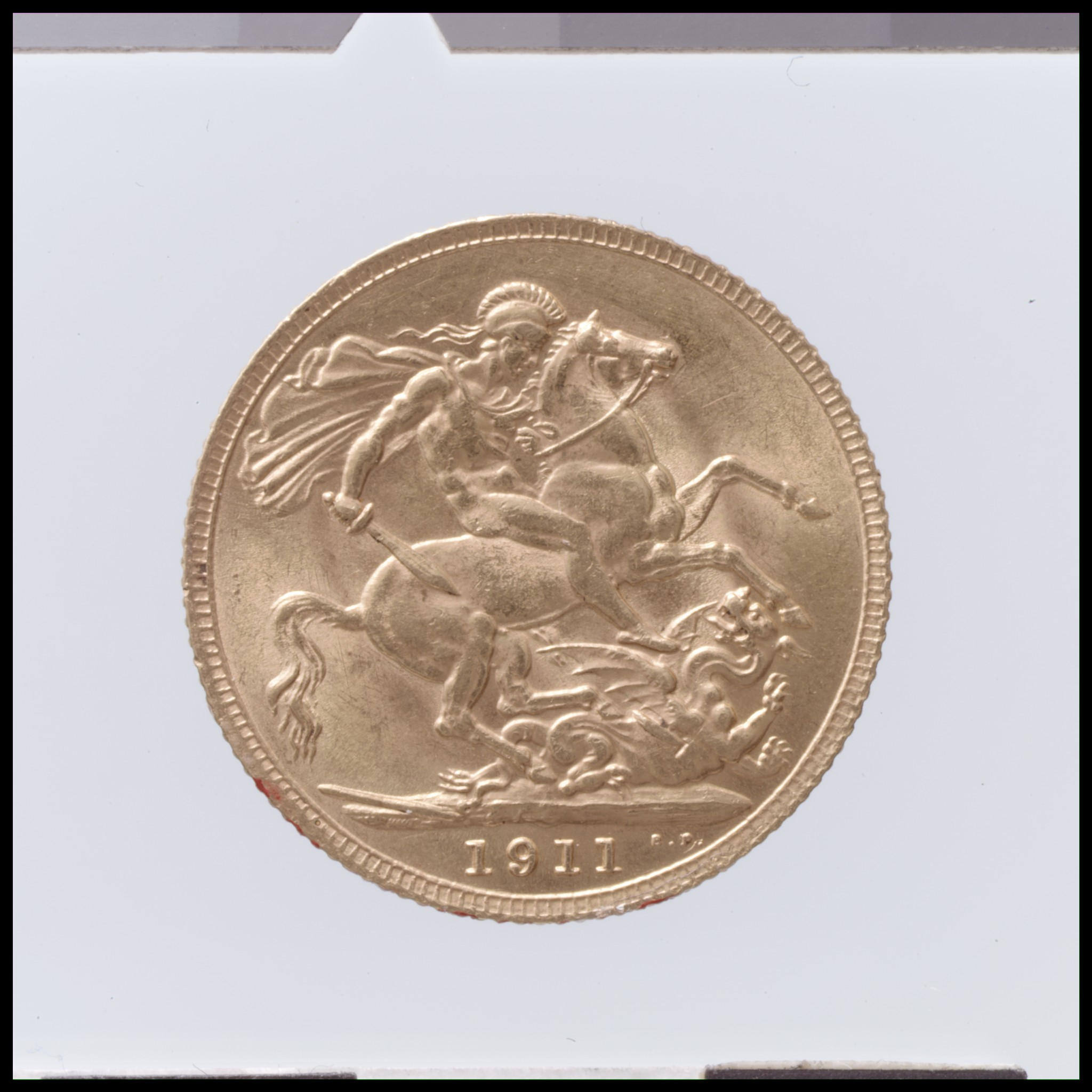
Reverse of a 1911 (George V) sovereign, showing the main element of Pistrucci's original George and the Dragon design of 1817

Pistrucci is probably remembered most for his George and Dragon design for the sovereign. Not greatly liked at the time of its origin, it has come to be celebrated. The Deputy Master of the Mint who restored the design to the sovereign in 1871, Charles Fremantle, stated his view that "it is hardly possible to over-rate the advantages accruing to a coinage from an artistic and well-executed design". By 1893, it was on all of Britain's gold coins; The Art Journal described Pistrucci's design as having "triumphantly borne the test of time". Marsh noted, "it is indeed a tribute that his wonderful design should still adorn the gold coinage of our current Queen Elizabeth II. It is one of the finest ever in our coinage history, and has certainly stood the test of time. Long may it continue." Pistrucci's design has also appeared on a non-circulating £20 silver coin in 2013 and on the crown in 1818–1823, 1887–1900, 1902 and 1951.

Roderick Farey, in his biographical articles on Pistrucci, described him as "an Italian with a fiery disposition, he had numerous arguments with the authorities but no-one could doubt his genius firstly as a cameo cutter and later as an engraver and medallist." Those disputes, and a perceived slowness to complete his works (especially the Waterloo Medal) have been sources of criticism by later writers. Howard Linecar, in his book on British coin designs and designers, wrote, "there is little doubt that Pistrucci held the cutting of these dies as a bargaining counter in his relentless efforts to obtain the post of Chief Engraver at the Royal Mint ... On balance it is perhaps fair to say that Pistrucci, having probably been promised that which he could not have ... squeezed the last drop of blood out of the situation." According to Clancy, "With great talent can often come controversy and throughout his career Pistrucci was acclaimed and reviled in equal measure, maintaining a series of tense relationships with his colleagues, the most pointed of which [was] with his fellow engraver William Wyon." Craig concluded, "Apart from the George and Dragon design, which was less esteemed then than now ... this artist's Mint works, unlike his private commissions, were failures".

The Waterloo Medal is regarded by many as a masterpiece on par with his St George and the Dragon. Pollard stated that the Waterloo Medal, "shows Pistrucci's command of the types (or figures) of cameos, an understanding of the figurative language of the Roman Renaissance, and an appreciation of the antique sculptured relief—his types, none the less, were always original". Marsh also praised the medal: "no better piece of intaglio engraving or design has surely ever been seen before or since. It contains as much as thirty ordinary-sized medals, and this alone is more than most medalists achieved in a life time."

Farey concluded his study of Pistrucci,

By his own admission, Benedetto Pistrucci argued readily with his peers and lost work by refusing point blank to copy the efforts of another artist. He remains an enigmatic figure whose genius is represented especially in the Waterloo medal and survives unsurpassed to this day in his portrayal of St George and the Dragon.

== Gallery ==
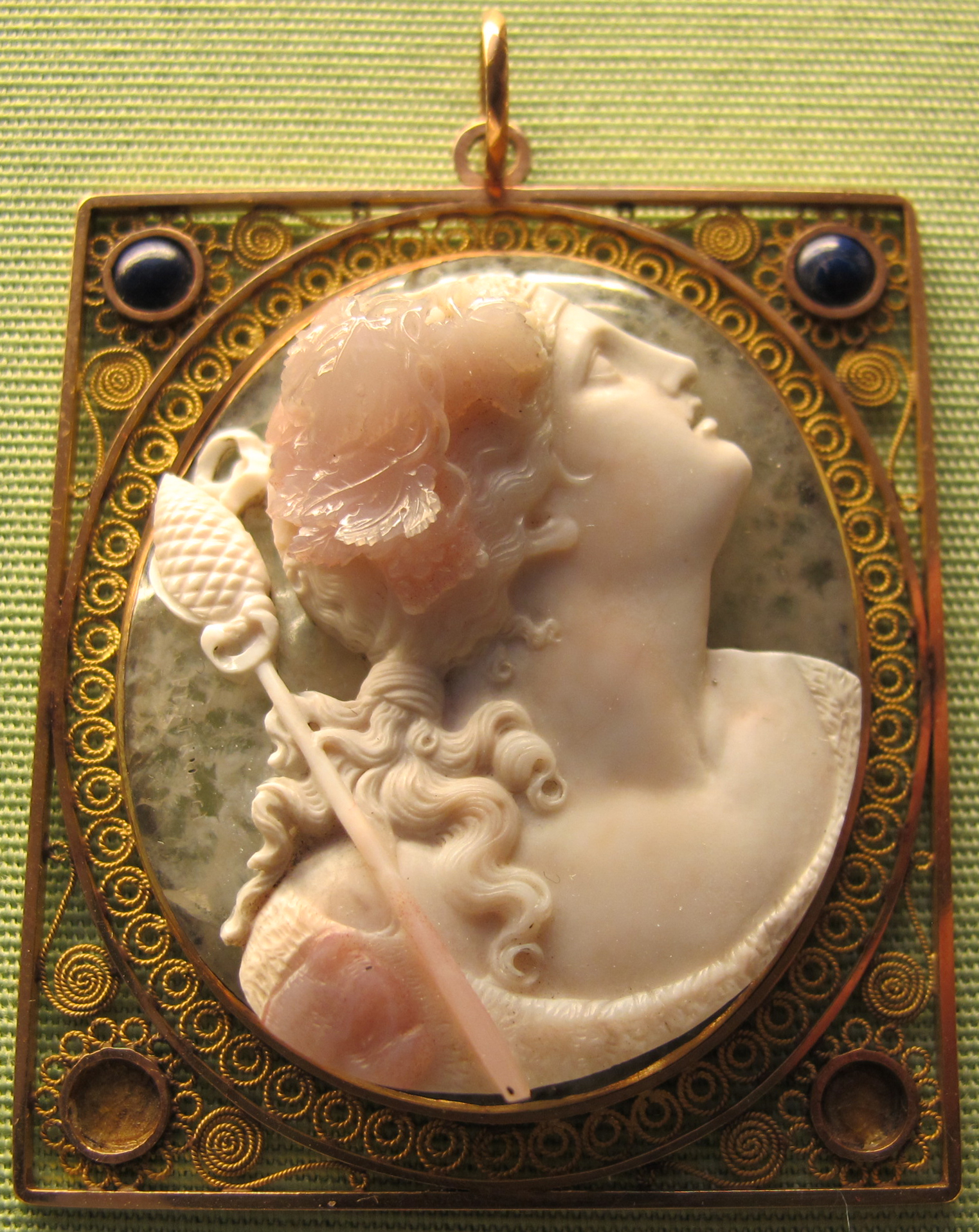
Cameo, 1810

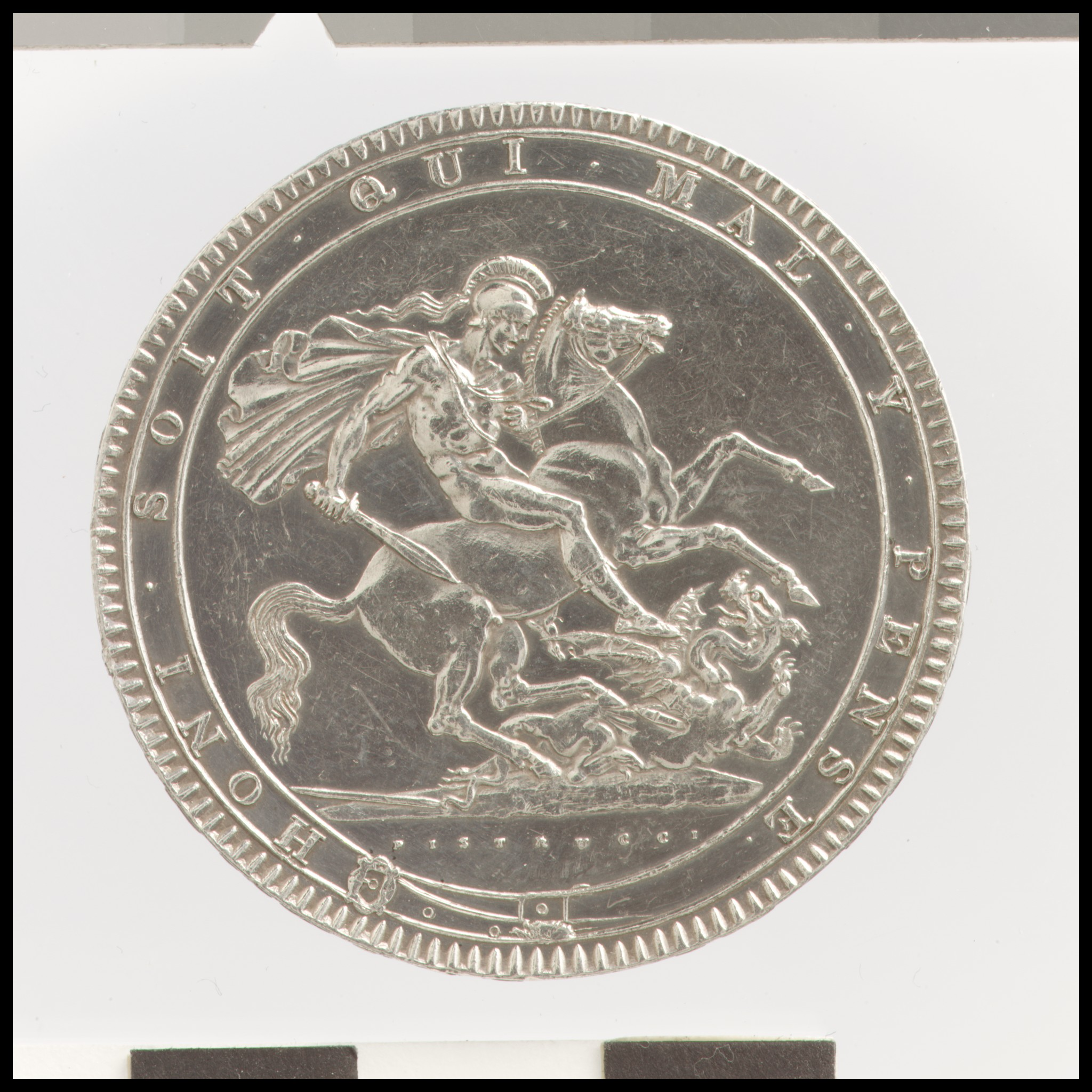
1819 crown

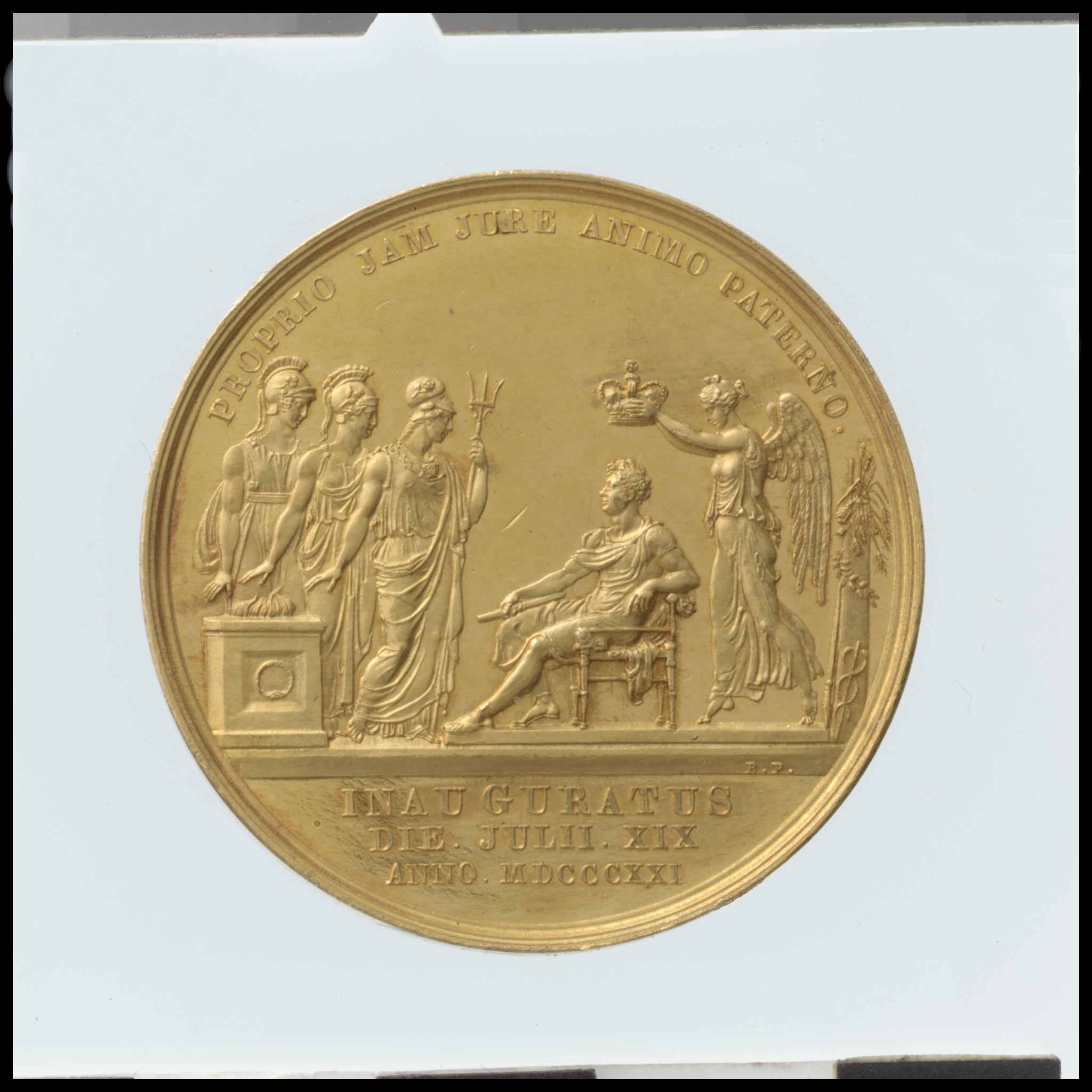
Coronation medal for George IV (1821). Note the elevated King.

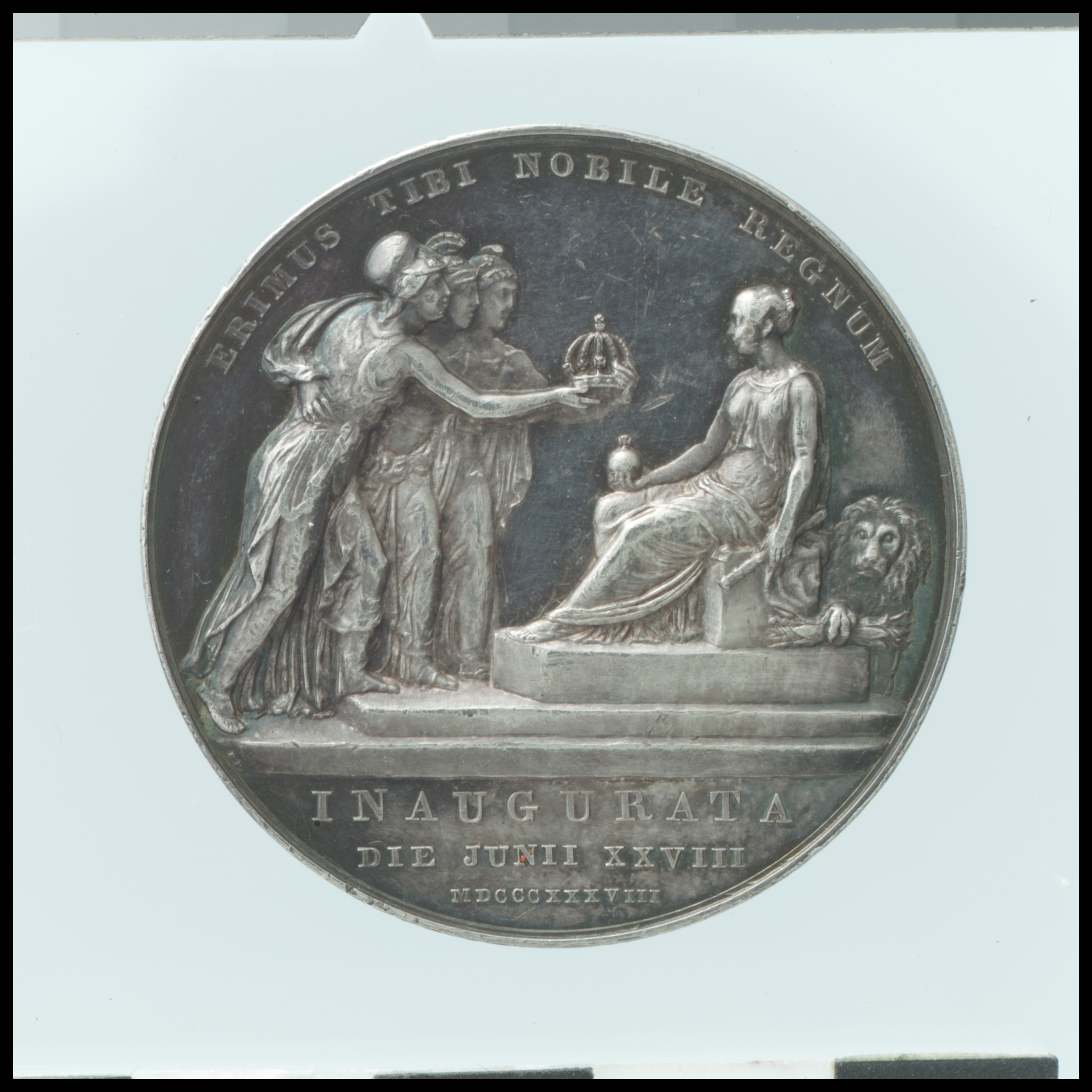
The Victoria Coronation design (1838) criticised by Joseph Hume

== Bibliography ==
- Clancy, Kevin (2017) [2015]. A History of the Sovereign: Chief Coin of the World (second ed.). Llantrisant, Wales: Royal Mint Museum. ISBN 978-1-869917-00-5.
- Craig, John (2010) [1953]. The Mint (paperback ed.). Cambridge, United Kingdom: Cambridge University Press. ISBN 978-0-521-17077-2.
- Dyer, G.P.; Gaspar, P.P. (1992), "Reform, the New Technology and Tower Hill", in Challis, C.E. (ed.), A New History of the Royal Mint, Cambridge, United Kingdom: Cambridge University Press, pp. 398–606, ISBN 978-0-521-24026-0
- Farey, Roderick (September 2014). "Benedetto Pistrucci (1782–1855), Part 1". Coin News: 51–53.
- Farey, Roderick (October 2014). "Benedetto Pistrucci (1782–1855), Part 2". Coin News: 51–53.
- Leonard Forrer. Benedetto Pistrucci: Italian medallist & gem-engraver, 1784-1855 (Spink, 1906).
- Linecar, H.W.A. (1977). British Coin Designs and Designers. London: G. Bell & Sons Ltd. ISBN 978-0-7135-1931-0.
- Lobel, Richard, ed. (1999) [1995]. Coincraft's Standard Catalogue English & UK Coins 1066 to Date (5th ed.). London: Standard Catalogue Publishers Ltd. ISBN 978-0-9526228-8-8.
- Marsh, Michael A. (1996). Benedetto Pistrucci: Principal Engraver and Chief Medallist of the Royal Mint, 1783-1855. Hardwick, Cambridgeshire: Michael A. Marsh (Publications). ISBN 978-0-9506929-2-0.
- Marsh, Michael A. (2002) [1980]. The Gold Sovereign (Golden Jubilee (Third) ed.). Hardwick, Cambridgeshire: Michael A. Marsh (Publications). ISBN 978-0-9506929-4-4.
- Mussell, John W., ed. (2016). The Coin Yearbook 2017. Exeter, Devon: Token Publishing Ltd. ISBN 978-1-908828-30-9.
- Peck, C. Wilson (1960). English Copper, Tin and Bronze Coins in the British Museum 1558–1958. London: Trustees of the British Museum. OCLC 906173180.
- Pollard, Graham. "Pistrucci, Benedetto". Oxford Dictionary of National Biography (online ed.). Oxford University Press. doi:10.1093/ref:odnb/22314. (Subscription, Wikipedia Library access or UK public library membership required.)
- Rodgers, Kerry (June 2017). "Britain's Gold Sovereign". Coin News: 43–47.

| Preceded by Conrad Küchler | Coins of the pound sterling Obverse sculptor 1817 | Succeeded by Jean Baptiste Merlen |
