= Matrix (numismatics) =

Intermediate mould used in the process of manufacturing coins

In numismatics, a matrix is an intermediate mould used in the process of manufacturing coins. The use of a matrix lengthens the production of dies, but makes for a gain in consistency.

== Terminology ==
The matrix is an "original die": indeed it has its design in the same sense as a die. The design is incised into the matrix, which is used to create punches. The creation of a matrix addresses the basic problem for the coinage of multiplying dies, i.e. having enough accurate copies of dies to produce long runs of essentially identical coins. The creation of a master punch from a matrix is called "hobbing".

In contrast, a patrix is a type of master punch with a design in relief, used to create dies.
