= Gold IRA =

Precious Metal Based IRA

A gold IRA or precious metals IRA is an individual retirement account in which physical gold or other approved precious metals are held in custody for the benefit of the IRA account owner. It functions the same as a regular IRA, only instead of holding paper assets, it holds physical bullion coins or bars. Precious metals IRAs are usually self-directed IRAs, a type of IRA where the custodian allows more diverse investments to be held in the account.

The four precious metals allowed to be held in an individual retirement account are gold, silver, platinum and palladium, provided they are in the form of IRS-approved coin or bar products. Since gold is the most commonly purchased of the four, the overarching term "gold IRA" is used most often as industry slang to mean a retirement account containing any combination of precious metals. Other terms such as, "precious metals IRA", "silver IRA", "platinum IRA", or "palladium IRA" are also frequently used.

Investors often use precious metals as a long-term hedge against inflation, to diversify their portfolio. Internal Revenue Code requirements state that the approved precious metals must be stored in a specific manner. Some trustees have their own facilities to hold the physical precious metals, while others use a third party metals depository as a storage facility.

== History ==
The Taxpayer Relief Act of 1997 broadened the permissible types of investments allowed in IRAs, stating: "Your IRA can invest in one, one-half, one-quarter, or one-tenth ounce U.S. gold coins, or one-ounce silver coins minted by the Treasury Department. Beginning in 1998, an IRA can invest in certain platinum coins and certain gold, silver, palladium, and platinum bullion."

== IRA-accepted precious metals ==
The IRS approves select precious metals and forms of bullion for IRAs. Although investment in "Collectibles" using IRAs and Qualified Plans is not allowed, there is a carve-out allowing for investment in certain coins, as well as bullion meeting certain fineness requirements. Gold bars are more difficult to sell due to their higher price and easier ability to be counterfeited, as well as being more difficult to deliver due to their heaviness and the amount of security required during transport. There are currently a variety of precious metals that meet the minimum purity requirements that are acceptable for inclusion into a gold IRA account. Some gold IRA companies argue inclusion of certain coins in a precious metals IRA; however, several of those companies have been investigated by the government for misleading customers and aggressively selling numismatic coins over gold bullion. Numismatic coins pay the gold company higher commissions, but bullion bars more directly reflect the spot price of the precious metal.

=== Gold ===
- American Gold Eagle bullion coins
- American Gold Eagle proof coins
- British Gold Britannia coins (from 2013)
- British The Queen's Beasts (coin)
- British gold Shēngxiào Lunar Series (British coin)
- Canadian Gold Maple Leaf coins
- Austrian Gold Philharmonic coins
- Australian Kangaroo/Nugget coins
- Chinese Gold Panda coins
- American Gold Buffalo uncirculated coins (proofs not allowed)
- Gold bars and rounds produced by a NYMEX or COMEX-approved refinery or national government mint, meeting minimum fineness requirements.

=== Silver ===
- American Silver Eagle bullion coins
- American Silver Eagle proof coins
- British Silver Britannia coins (from 2013)
- British The Queen's Beasts (coin)
- British silver Shēngxiào Lunar Series (British coin)
- Canadian Silver Maple Leaf coins
- Austrian Silver Philharmonic coins
- Australian Silver Kookaburra coins
- Chinese Silver Panda coins
- Mexican Libertad coins
- Silver bars and rounds produced by a NYMEX or COMEX-approved refinery or national government mint, meeting minimum fineness requirements

=== Platinum ===
- American Platinum Eagle coins
- American Platinum Eagle proof coins
- British The Queen's Beasts (coin)
- British Britannia (coin) (from 2018)
- Canadian Platinum Maple Leaf coins
- Isle of Man Noble coins
- Australian Platinum Koala coins
- Platinum bars and rounds produced by a NYMEX or COMEX-approved refinery or national government mint, meeting minimum fineness requirements

=== Palladium ===
- American Palladium Eagle bullion coins
- Canadian Palladium Maple Leaf coins
- Palladium bars and rounds produced by a NYMEX or COMEX-approved refinery or national government mint, meeting minimum fineness requirements

== Receiving distributions ==
The laws for taking distributions from a gold IRA are the same as those for a regular IRA. The account holder may liquidate their IRA metals for cash or take physical possession of them. Both actions are akin to taking an IRA distribution and will be taxed accordingly.

== Storage ==
To comply with IRS requirements, all IRAs, including precious metals IRAs, must leave their assets in possession of a trustee or custodian, not the owner's individual possession. IRS Publication 590 specifies that for all IRAs, "The trustee or custodian must be a bank, a federally insured credit union, a savings and loan association, or an entity approved by the IRS to act as trustee or custodian." All nonbank IRA trustees must demonstrate to the IRS that they will meet Treasury standards of accounting, auditing, reporting, and asset security.

Several companies promote gold IRA arrangements based on the checkbook control strategy, where the IRA does not own the metals directly, but owns a limited liability company (LLC) through which the taxpayer purchases and stores the metals. Neither the IRS nor federal courts have taken a position on the legality of these arrangements, and the IRS has warned that they carry a risk of disqualifying the IRA.

== Risks and Considerations in Gold IRA Investments ==
While Gold IRAs offer unique benefits, such as diversification and a hedge against inflation, they also come with specific risks and considerations that investors must evaluate. One of the primary concerns is the volatility of gold prices, which can lead to significant fluctuations in the value of the IRA. Additionally, the fees associated with Gold IRAs, including storage, insurance, and custodial fees, can be higher compared to traditional IRAs, impacting long-term returns.

Liquidity is another important factor; selling physical gold can be more complex and time-consuming than liquidating other assets like stocks or bonds. Moreover, the market for specific types of coins or bullion may be limited, potentially affecting the ease of sale.

Investors should also be wary of potential fraud and scams in the Gold IRA industry. Some companies have been known to push high-commission products like numismatic coins, which do not offer the same value as standard bullion. Thorough due diligence is essential when choosing a Gold IRA provider, and investors are advised to consult with financial professionals to ensure that a Gold IRA aligns with their overall retirement strategy. For more insights on evaluating precious metals investments, see the U.S. Securities and Exchange Commission’s guidelines.
