= Lunar Series (British coin) =

British coins featuring the Chinese zodiac

Year of the Sheep (Gold)
- United Kingdom
- Value: 100 pounds sterling
- Mass: 31.103 g
- Diameter: 38.61 mm
- Thickness: 2.7 mm
- Edge: Milled
- Composition: .9999 fine gold
- Years of minting: 2016

Obverse
- Design: Queen Elizabeth II
- Designer: Jody Clark

Reverse
- Design: Sheep
- Designer: Wuon-Gean Ho
- Design date: 2016

The Lunar Series or Shēngxiào Collection (生肖, '(Chinese) zodiac') coin series is a collection of British coins issued by the Royal Mint, featuring the Chinese zodiac in celebration of Chinese New Year. First issued in 2014, the series has been minted in varying denominations of silver and gold, as both bullion and proof.

== Year of the Horse 2014 ==
=== Reverse ===
The reverse design consists of a galloping Horse set against the background of the pre-historic Uffington White Horse, located in Oxfordshire. Lettering on the coin reads "YEAR OF THE HORSE · 2014"^{a} plus details of the mass and metal content of the coin. The Chinese character for Horse (馬) is displayed near the coin's centre.

==== Mule version ====
In March 2014, it was reported that a number of 1oz bullion coins had mistakenly been struck with the incorrect die. Around 38,000 of the Lunar Horse coins were struck with an obverse intended for the Britannia series, while 17,000 Britannia coins were stuck with the obverse for the Lunar series.

== Year of the Sheep 2015 ==
The reverse design consists of two Yorkshire Swaledale sheep facing each other and the background consists of a forest of trees.^{B} As designer Wuon-Gean Ho explains: "the ancient Chinese character for the word sheep looks a little bit like a tree", so the forest consists of a series of this character (羊). This character is further displayed near the coin's center. Across the top lettering, it reads "YEAR OF THE SHEEP · 2015" plus details of the mass and metal content of the coin.

== Year of the Monkey 2016 ==
The reverse design features a leaping rhesus monkey jumping forward from a tree with another monkey also jumping in the background. Lettering on the coin reads "YEAR OF THE MONKEY· 2016"^{A} plus details of the mass and metal content of the coin. The Chinese character for Monkey (猴) is displayed in the lower right of the coin.

== Year of the Rooster 2017 ==
The reverse design features a crowing rooster amongst ten sea thrift flowers, the number ten symbolising of perfection in Chinese culture. Lettering on the coin reads "YEAR OF THE ROOSTER · 2017"^{A} plus details of the mass and metal content of the coin. The Chinese character for Rooster (雞) is displayed near the coin's centre. Unlike the previous coins in the series, the 2017 coin breaks the otherwise uniform smooth obverse design, opting for an obverse similar to that of the Britannia coin series.

== Year of the Dog 2018 ==
Wuon-Gean explains on the Royal Mint's site that "the reverse design is a picture of a very happy, bounding dog that is jumping for joy! This dog is a mix between a West-Highland white Terrier and a Jack Russell – it’s really wirey and really energetic; he also looks like he’s smiling because his mouth is slightly open and it seems like he’s leaping across the waves. In reality, the background is a hidden story; I like to put hidden motifs in my coins, so the background is actually created from a nose pattern of another dog. The nose print is unique to every dog, so the nose print is a portrait of another animal that this dog is potentially playing with – it’s a story of a dog in a landscape, but the landscape is not what you expect it to be. The signature is in the foreground of the landscape and it’s looks like a little shell on a beach – it’s just a motif that says “Wuon-Gean” in very old characters, at the front of the coin." The reverse design features the Chinese character (狗) displayed near the coin's center.

== Year of the Pig 2019 ==
The reverse design on this Royal Mint Shēngxiào Collection coin celebrates the Year of the Pig. The design by Harry Brockway represents these traits and the cultural traditions behind the lunar calendar, and shows a female pig (or sow) suckling five piglets. Brockway includes an English Cottage in the background. Each coin features the traditional Chinese symbol for ‘pig’ appears below the sow's head (豬).

== Year of the Rat 2020 ==
The rat is the seventh design in The Shēngxiào Collection and this coin was designed by illustrator P.J. Lynch. The design obviously features a rat itself, which had to be appealing and interesting. Lynch claims he shows a rat as it twists, responding to a noise or something happening nearby. The rat is momentarily vulnerable, but also curious and unafraid. Lynch adds: "As well as the twisting body, I was able to have fun with the rat’s long curvy tail, which weaves its way around the composition through the flowers. I chose peonies because of their popularity in China and association with good luck. The arch of text frames the upper hemisphere of the design, and then the only other element is the Chinese character for ‘rat’. I have placed this so that the trailing stroke echoes the shape of the rat's face and jaw. I wanted them to look like continental plates on a globe that might belong together." The Chinese character for rat (鼠) is displayed near the coin's centre.

== Year of the Ox 2021 ==
Harry Brockway on the Royal Mint site is quoted as saying: "It was important to give an Eastern feel to the design, yet with a ‘British twist'. The design was inspired by eighteenth-century British paintings of prize cattle and he places the Ox in an English landscape." Harry's design contains a variety of elements, including blossom trees and ploughs. He claims he explores the concept of a minimalist setting with a strong focus on the creature itself; the design has an emphasis on ‘less is more’. By stripping back the distractions and placing the ox centre stage, Harry believes his final design managed to portray the ox in its purest form. The Chinese character for Ox (牛) is displayed near the coin's centre.

== Year of the Tiger 2022 ==
The 2022 coin features the Tiger. David Lawrence's reverse design depicts a tiger facing front and the Chinese character for "tiger" (虎).

== Year of the Rabbit 2023 ==
The 2023 coin features the Rabbit. It was the last of the series to depict Queen Elizabeth II, who died in September 2022. The reverse design by Louie Maryon shows a rabbit and falling oak leaves, as well as the Chinese character for "rabbit" (兔).

== Year of the Dragon 2024 ==
The 2024 coin features the Dragon. It is the first of the series to depict King Charles III, who acceded to the throne in September 2022. The reverse design by William Webb shows a Chinese dragon flying over a forest, as well as the Traditional Chinese character for "dragon" (龍).

== Year of the Snake 2025 ==
The 2025 coin features the Snake and completes the 12-sign cycle of the Chinese zodiac. Designed by Chris Costello, it shows a coiled adder on grass and the Chinese character 蛇 (shé) for "snake". The obverse features King Charles III.

== Year of the Horse 2026 ==
The 2026 coin features the Horse (Chinese 馬 mǎ). Designed by William Webb, it shows a thoroughbred racehorse and a stable.

== Face values ==
Face Value
	1/10 ozt	1 ozt	5 ozt	1 kg
Silver	—N/a	£2	£10	£500
Gold	£10	£100	£500	£1,000

== Mintage figures ==
Silver										Notes
Year	Obverse	Obverse Designer	Reverse	Reverse Designer	Bullion	Proof				Notes
Year	Obverse	Obverse Designer	Reverse	Reverse Designer	1oz	1 oz	1 oz PNC	5oz	1 Kilo	Notes
2014	Queen Elizabeth II	Ian Rank-Broadley	Horse	Wuon-Gean Ho	300,000	8,888	2,014	1,488		
2015	Queen Elizabeth II	Ian Rank-Broadley	Sheep	Wuon-Gean Ho	188,888	9,888	2,015	1,088		
2016	Queen Elizabeth II	Jody Clark	Monkey	Wuon-Gean Ho	138,888	8,054	2,016	588	88	
2017	Queen Elizabeth II	Jody Clark	Rooster	Wuon-Gean Ho	138,888	3,888		388	68	
2018	Queen Elizabeth II	Jody Clark	Dog	Wuon-Gean Ho	138,888	5,008		388	108	
2019	Queen Elizabeth II	Jody Clark	Pig	Harry Brockway	138,888	3,888		288	38	
2020	Queen Elizabeth II	Jody Clark	Rat	P.J. Lynch	138,888	3,898		198	38	
2021	Queen Elizabeth II	Jody Clark	Ox	Harry Brockway		3,998		198	38	
2022	Queen Elizabeth II	Jody Clark	Tiger	David Lawrence		3,998		228	38	
2023	Queen Elizabeth II	Jody Clark	Rabbit	Louie Maryon		2,888		228	50	
2024	King Charles III	Martin Jennings	Dragon	William Webb		3,898		288	52	
2025	King Charles III	Martin Jennings	Snake	Chris Costello						
2026	King Charles III	Martin Jennings	Horse	William Webb						

Gold												Notes
Year	Obverse	Obverse Designer	Reverse	Reverse Designer	Bullion	BU		Proof				Notes
Year	Obverse	Obverse Designer	Reverse	Reverse Designer	1oz Gold	1/10 oz	1/4 oz	1oz	1 oz Gold-plated	5 oz	1 Kilo	Notes
2014	Queen Elizabeth II	Ian Rank-Broadley	Horse	Wuon-Gean Ho	30,000	2,888		888				
2015	Queen Elizabeth II	Ian Rank-Broadley	Sheep	Wuon-Gean Ho	8,888	2,888		888	4,888	38		
2016	Queen Elizabeth II	Jody Clark	Monkey	Wuon-Gean Ho	8,888	1,888		888		38	8	
2017	Queen Elizabeth II	Jody Clark	Rooster	Wuon-Gean Ho	8,888	2,088		688		38	8	
2018	Queen Elizabeth II	Jody Clark	Dog	Wuon-Gean Ho		1,008		888				
2019	Queen Elizabeth II	Jody Clark	Pig	Harry Brockway	8,888	1,088		888	58	38		
2020	Queen Elizabeth II	Jody Clark	Rat	P.J. Lynch	8,888		398	898		30	10	
2021	Queen Elizabeth II	Jody Clark	Ox	Harry Brockway			398	898				
2022	Queen Elizabeth II	Jody Clark	Tiger	David Lawrence				888			10	
2023	Queen Elizabeth II	Jody Clark	Rabbit	Louie Maryon			388	888		128	8	
2024	King Charles III	Martin Jennings	Dragon	William Webb			388	888		128		
2025	King Charles III	Martin Jennings	Snake	Chris Costello								
2026	King Charles III	Martin Jennings	Horse	William Webb								

== See also ==
- List of British banknotes and coins
- Coins of the pound sterling
- Royal Mint
- The Queen's Beasts (coin)
- Gold as an investment
- Silver as an investment

== Notes ==
^A Coin mass and metal content are only displayed of bullion coins
^B This feature only appears on proof coins
