= Silver exchange-traded product =

Exchange-traded products linked to the price of silver

Silver exchange-traded products are exchange-traded products (ETPs) that seek to provide exposure to silver or to the market price of silver. They include exchange-traded funds (ETFs), exchange-traded commodities (ETCs), exchange-traded notes (ETNs), and closed-end funds or trusts. Product structures vary: some hold allocated bullion with a custodian, while others obtain exposure through futures contracts, swaps, or other derivatives.

Silver ETPs are traded on major securities exchanges, including exchanges in the United States, Canada, the United Kingdom, Switzerland, and other markets. Their legal structure, redemption terms, fees, tax treatment, and exposure to counterparty risk differ by issuer and jurisdiction.

== History and market impact ==
The first silver ETF was established in April 2006. The iShares Silver Trust was organized as a New York trust on April 21, 2006. The United States Geological Survey reported in 2011 that the rise in silver prices through 2010 corresponded with continued investment interest and holdings in new silver ETFs, and that silver ETF inventories totaled 15,240 metric tons at the end of November 2010.

As a date-stamped example of the scale of a large silver ETP, the iShares Silver Trust reported holdings of 490,988,894 troy ounces of silver at March 31, 2026. The U.S. Geological Survey estimated world silver mine production at 26,000 metric tons in 2025.

== Structure ==
=== Physically backed products ===
Physically backed silver ETPs generally hold silver bullion in vaults and seek to track the spot price of silver, less fees and expenses. The bullion may be held by a bank custodian, a mint, or another vaulting provider. For example, the iShares Silver Trust holds silver bullion with JPMorgan Chase Bank, N.A., London Branch, as custodian, and values its silver by reference to the LBMA Silver Price. WisdomTree describes WisdomTree Physical Silver as an ETC backed by allocated silver bullion held by HSBC Bank plc.

Some closed-end trusts and bullion funds also allow large holders to redeem units for physical silver, subject to minimum redemption sizes and other product terms. Sprott states that the Sprott Physical Silver Trust holds unencumbered and fully allocated London Good Delivery silver bars and offers monthly physical redemption subject to minimum requirements.

=== Derivative, leveraged, and inverse products ===
Some silver ETPs do not hold physical silver. Instead, they use futures, swaps, or other derivatives to track silver prices or silver-price indexes. Leveraged and inverse products are generally designed to provide a multiple, or inverse multiple, of the daily return of a silver index. ProShares states that ProShares Ultra Silver seeks twice the daily performance of the Bloomberg Silver Subindex, while ProShares UltraShort Silver seeks twice the inverse daily performance of the same index. Both products state that they invest in derivatives such as futures and swaps and do not directly invest in silver.

== Examples ==
The following examples include historically significant products, selected current products, and selected successor vehicles; the table is not a complete directory of silver ETPs.

Product	Main structure	Notes
iShares Silver Trust	Physically backed U.S. grantor trust	Organized on April 21, 2006; shares trade on NYSE Arca under the ticker symbol SLV.
abrdn Physical Silver Shares ETF	Physically backed silver trust	abrdn states that the fund seeks to track the price of silver bullion, less trust expenses, and holds silver bullion bars in vaults.
WisdomTree Physical Silver	Exchange-traded commodity backed by allocated silver	Formerly associated with ETF Securities' European ETC business, which was acquired by WisdomTree in 2018; WisdomTree describes the product as backed by allocated silver bullion held by HSBC Bank plc.
ZKB/Swisscanto Silver ETF	Swiss physically backed silver ETF	The ZKB Silver ETF termsheet stated that the fund invested exclusively in physical silver and that units were listed on the SIX Swiss Exchange.
Sprott Physical Silver Trust	Closed-end physical bullion trust	Sprott states that the trust holds unencumbered and fully allocated London Good Delivery silver bars and offers monthly physical redemption subject to product minimums.
iShares Silver Bullion ETF	Canadian physically backed silver ETF	BlackRock states that the fund seeks to replicate the performance of the price of silver bullion, less fees and expenses.
Purpose Silver Bullion Fund	Canadian open-ended silver bullion fund	Purpose states that the fund owns physical silver bullion held in fully allocated and segregated form at a Canadian chartered bank; the fund is a successor to Silver Bullion Trust after a 2016 conversion.
Sprott Physical Gold and Silver Trust	Closed-end physical bullion trust	Successor vehicle associated with Central Fund of Canada after Sprott completed its acquisition and reorganization in 2018.
Xtrackers Physical Silver ETC	Secured silver ETC	DWS describes the product as a secured, limited-recourse ETC collateralized by physical silver; the product page gives a launch date of August 27, 2010.
Invesco Physical Silver ETC	Silver ETC collateralized by bullion	Invesco describes the product as seeking to provide the performance of the spot silver price through certificates collateralized with silver bullion.
ProShares Ultra Silver and ProShares UltraShort Silver	Leveraged and inverse derivative-based ETFs	ProShares states that the funds seek 2x and -2x daily performance, respectively, of the Bloomberg Silver Subindex; the funds use derivatives and do not directly invest in silver.

== Former names and restructured products ==
Several products that appeared in early lists of silver ETPs have since been renamed, acquired, or restructured:

- Central Fund of Canada was reorganized into Sprott Physical Gold and Silver Trust after Sprott completed its 2018 acquisition and management transition.
- Silver Bullion Trust was converted into Purpose Silver Bullion Fund in 2016.
- ETFS Physical Silver became part of WisdomTree's European ETC platform after WisdomTree acquired ETF Securities' European exchange-traded commodity, currency, and short-and-leveraged business in 2018.
- Claymore Silver Bullion Trust was part of the group of Claymore exchange-traded and closed-end funds affected by BlackRock's 2012 acquisition of Claymore Investments. BlackRock said most Claymore ETFs and closed-end funds were expected to be rebranded to iShares, and BlackRock Investments Canada later converted its silver bullion closed-end fund into an ETF called the iShares Silver Bullion Fund (SVR).
- Julius Baer Physical Silver Fund was among the Julius Baer-branded funds rebranded under the GAM name in 2017.

== See also ==
- Gold exchange-traded product
- Platinum as an investment
- Silver as an investment
- Commodity ETPs
- Precious metal
