= Chinese lunar coins =

Overview of coin production

In 1981, China began minting coins to commemorate the Chinese New Year. The Chinese lunar series consist of gold, silver and platinum coins, in a variety of sizes, denominations and shapes. The reverse of each coin depicts the zodiac animal for the corresponding year of issue, while the obverse features an historical building or other notable cultural image.

== 1981–1992 (1st Lunar Series) ==
The size, mintage, metal content and even face value changed, throughout the first series. This is a reflection of China's gradual adoption of the ounce over the metric gram in line with international bullion standards and China's improving economic conditions and technological advances.

From 1981 to 1987, the obverse and reverse of the 8 g gold coin were the same as that of the 15 g silver coin. The exception being in 1985, when the reverse differed. 1987 seems to be special:

- both the 5 ozt (5.5 oz; 160 g) silver lunar coin and the 5 ozt silver panda coin were debuted,
- the 5 ozt (5.5 oz; 160 g) silver lunar coin was the first of the series to be over 99% pure silver, and
- the 5 ozt (5.5 oz; 160 g) silver coin had a face value of 50 yuan, even though it contained over 10 times as much silver as the 15 g silver coin, which had a face value of 10 yuan.

In 1988, the first platinum lunar coin was introduced and the number of different lunar coins exploded when the Shanghai Mint began minting a different set of lunar coins. In total, there were 4 different designs: the 5 ozt (5.5 oz; 160 g) coins featured triple dragons and the 15 g and 8 g coins each featured a different dragon; the Shanghai Mint coins featured double dragon reverses.

All coins minted by the Shenyang mint, unless noted with an "SH", which indicates that it was minted by the Shanghai mint. The size, mintage and face values are listed to illustrate the numerous changing standards in the first lunar series.

1st Lunar Series 1981–1992
Year	Animal	Silver Coins (mintage)	Gold Coins (mintage)	Platinum Coins (mintage)
1981	Rooster	15 g, 33 mm, 30 CNY (10,000)	8 g, 23 mm, 250 CNY (5,000)	
1982	Dog	15 g, 33 mm, 20 CNY (15,000)	8 g, 23 mm, 200 CNY (5,000)	
1983	Pig	15 g, 33 mm, 10 CNY (10,000)	8 g, 23 mm, 150 CNY (5,000)	
1984	Rat	15 g, 33 mm, 10 CNY (10,000)	8 g, 23 mm, 150 CNY (5,000)	
1985	Ox	15 g, 33 mm, 10 CNY (10,000)	8 g, 23 mm, 150 CNY (5,000)	
1986	Tiger	15 g 33 mm 10 CNY (15,000)	8 g, 23 mm, 150 CNY (5,000)	
1987	Rabbit	15 g, 33 mm, 10 CNY (15,000); 5 ozt (5.5 oz; 160 g), 70 mm, 50 CNY (4,000)	8 g, 23 mm, 150 CNY (5,000)	
1988	Dragon	15 g, 33 mm, 10 CNY (15,000); 1 ozt (1.1 oz; 31 g), 32 mm, 10 CNY SH (20,000); 5 ozt (5.5 oz; 160 g), 70mm, 50 CNY (5,000); 12 oz, 80 mm, 100 CNY SH (3,000)	8 g, 23 mm, 150 CNY (7,500); 1 ozt (1.1 oz; 31 g), 32 mm, 100 CNY SH (3,000); 5 ozt (5.5 oz; 160 g), 60 mm, 500 CNY (3,000); 12 oz, 1,000 CNY SH (500)	1 ozt (1.1 oz; 31 g), 32 mm, 100 CNY SH (2,000)
1989	Snake	15 g, 33 mm, 10 CNY (15,000); 1 ozt (1.1 oz; 31 g), 32 mm, 10 CNY SH (6,000); 5 ozt (5.5 oz; 160 g), 70 mm, 50 CNY (1,000); 12 oz, 80 mm, 100 CNY SH (400)	8 g, 23 mm, 150 CNY (7,500); 1 ozt (1.1 oz; 31 g), 32 mm, 100 CNY SH (3,000); 5 ozt (5.5 oz; 160 g), 60 mm, 500 CNY (500); 12 oz, 70 mm, 1,000 CNY SH (200)	1 ozt (1.1 oz; 31 g), 32 mm, 100 CNY SH (1,000)
1990	Horse	15 g, 33 mm, 10CNY (15,000); 1 ozt (1.1 oz; 31 g), 32 mm, 10 CNY SH (12,000); 5 ozt (5.5 oz; 160 g), 70 mm, 50 CNY (2,000); 12 oz, 80 mm, 100 CNY SH (1,000)	8 g, 23 mm, 150 CNY (7,500); 1 ozt (1.1 oz; 31 g), 32 mm, 100 CNY SH (6,000); 5 ozt (5.5 oz; 160 g), 60 mm, 500 CNY (500); 12 oz, 70 mm, 1,000 CNY SH (200?)	1 ozt (1.1 oz; 31 g), 32 mm, 100 CNY SH (2,000)
1991	Goat	15 g, 33 mm, 10 CNY (15,000); 1 ozt (1.1 oz; 31 g), 32 mm, 10 CNY SH (8,100); 5 ozt (5.5 oz; 160 g), 70 mm, 50 CNY (2,000); 12 oz, 80 mm, 100 CNY SH (1,000)	8 g, 23 mm, 150 CNY (7,500); 1 ozt (1.1 oz; 31 g), 32 mm, 100 CNY SH (1,900); 5 ozt (5.5 oz; 160 g), 60 mm, 500 CNY (400); 12 oz, 70 mm, 1,000 CNY SH (200)	1 ozt (1.1 oz; 31 g), 32 mm, 100 CNY SH (500)
1992	Monkey	15 g, 33 mm, 10 CNY (10,000); 1 ozt (1.1 oz; 31 g), 32 mm, 10 CNY SH (8,100); 5 ozt (5.5 oz; 160 g), 70 mm, 50 CNY (1,000); 12 oz, 80 mm, 100 CNY SH (500)	8 g, 23 mm, 150 CNY (5,000); 1 ozt (1.1 oz; 31 g), 32 mm, 100 CNY SH (1,900); 5 ozt (5.5 oz; 160 g), 60 mm, 500 CNY (99); 12 oz, 70 mm, 1,000 CNY SH (99)	1 ozt (1.1 oz; 31 g), 32 mm, 100 CNY SH (300)

== The 2nd Series 1988–1999 for 1 ozt Ag Piedfort ==
These were minted as 1 ozt (1.1 oz; 31 g) silver, but were 32 mm in diameter, instead of the standard 40 mm. This increased the thickness in the style of a piedfort coin.

- 1988 Dragon Mintage: 20,000
- 1989 Snake
- 1990 Horse
- 1991 Goat
- 1992 Monkey
- 1993 Rooster Mintage: 9,000
- 1994 Dog
- 1995 Pig
- 1996 Rat
- 1997 Ox Mintage: 8,000
- 1998 Tiger Mintage: 8,000
- 1999 Rabbit

== The 3rd Series 1997–2008 for 1 ozt Ag ==
- 1997 Ox
- 1998 Tiger
- 1999 Rabbit
- 2000 Dragon
- 2001 Snake
- 2002 Horse
- 2003 Goat
- 2004 Monkey
- 2005 Rooster
- 2006 Dog
- 2007 Pig
- 2008 Rat

== The 4th Series 2009–2020 for 1 ozt Ag ==
- 2009 Ox
- 2010 Tiger
- 2011 Rabbit
- 2012 Dragon
- 2013 Snake
- 2014 Horse
- 2015 Goat
- 2016 Monkey
- 2017 Rooster

== The 1st Scallop Series 1993–2004 for 2/3 oz Ag ==
Mintage: 6,800 each

- 1993 Rooster
- 1994 Dog
- 1995 Pig
- 1996 Rat
- 1997 Ox
- 1998 Tiger
- 1999 Rabbit
- 2000 Dragon
- 2001 Snake
- 2002 Horse
- 2003 Goat
- 2004 Monkey

== The 1st Scallop Series 1993–2004 for 1/2 ozt Au ==
Mintage: 2,300 each

- 1993 Rooster
- 1994 Dog
- 1995 Pig
- 1996 Rat
- 1997 Ox
- 1998 Tiger
- 1999 Rabbit
- 2000 Dragon
- 2001 Snake
- 2002 Horse
- 2003 Goat
- 2004 Monkey

== The 2nd Scallop Series 2005–2016 for 1 ozt Ag ==
Mintage: 60,000 each

- 2005 Rooster
- 2006 Dog
- 2007 Pig
- 2008 Rat
- 2009 Ox
- 2010 Tiger
- 2011 Rabbit
- 2012 Dragon
- 2013 Snake
- 2014 Horse
- 2015 Goat
- 2016 Monkey

== The 2nd Scallop Series 2005–2016 for 1/2 ozt Au ==
Mintage: 8,000 each

- 2005 Rooster
- 2006 Dog
- 2007 Pig
- 2008 Rat
- 2009 Ox
- 2010 Tiger
- 2011 Rabbit
- 2012 Dragon
- 2013 Snake
- 2014 Horse
- 2015 Goat
- 2016 Monkey

== The 1st Fan Series 2000–2011 for 1 ozt Ag ==
Mintage: 66,000 each

- 2000 Dragon
- 2001 Snake
- 2002 Horse
- 2003 Goat
- 2004 Monkey
- 2005 Rooster
- 2006 Dog
- 2007 Pig
- 2008 Rat
- 2009 Ox
- 2010 Tiger
- 2011 Rabbit

== The 1st Fan Series 2000–2011 for 1/2 ozt Au ==
Mintage: 6,600 each

- 2000 Dragon
- 2001 Snake
- 2002 Horse
- 2003 Goat
- 2004 Monkey
- 2005 Rooster
- 2006 Dog
- 2007 Pig
- 2008 Rat
- 2009 Ox
- 2010 Tiger
- 2011 Rabbit

== The 2nd Fan Series 2012–2024 for 1/3 ozt Au ==
- 2012 Dragon
- 2013 Snake
- 2014 Horse
- 2015 Goat

== The 2nd Fan Series 2012–2024 for 1 ozt Ag ==
- 2012 Dragon
- 2013 Snake
- 2014 Horse
- 2015 Goat

== See also ==
- Lunar Series (British coin)
