= The Queen's Beasts (coin) =

21st-century British coin series

The Lion of England (Bullion Silver)
- United Kingdom
- Value: 5 pounds sterling
- Mass: 62.42 g
- Diameter: 38.61 mm
- Thickness: 6 mm
- Edge: Milled
- Composition: .9999 silver
- Years of minting: 2016

Obverse
- Design: Queen Elizabeth II
- Designer: Jody Clark
- Design date: 2015

Reverse
- Design: The Lion of England
- Designer: Jody Clark
- Design date: 2016

The Queen's Beasts coins are British coins issued by the Royal Mint in platinum, gold, and silver since 2016. Each of the 10 beast coins in the series features a stylized version of one of the heraldic Queen's Beasts statues present at the coronation of Queen Elizabeth II representing her royal line of ancestry. The silver coin is notable as the first two-ounce United Kingdom silver bullion coin. Engraver Jody Clark designed the entire series. In December 2016, a full line of proof-quality coins was announced. In 2017, the mint began producing a platinum version of the coin. In April 2021, the Royal Mint issued an eleventh "Completer Coin" that featured all 10 of the Queen's Beasts, taking the series to 11 coins in total. The April 2021 release included a "one of a kind" gold coin weighing 10 kg and a denominated value of £10,000. Based upon the UK spot price at the time of release, the 10 kg gold coin had an intrinsic scrap value of approximately £411,000. It was widely reported that the 10 kg gold coin was the heaviest gold coin the Royal Mint had ever produced and that it had taken 400 hours to produce, four days to polish and has been described as a "Masterwork". The Royal Mint announced that Completer Coin completes the Queen's Beasts commemorative collection.

Single coins were delivered in a plastic coin capsule or flip, as chosen when ordering. Bulk orders were delivered in the same containers used for packaging Britannia bullion coins: 10 coins per tube, 20 tubes per box. The tube for silver can potentially hold a total of 14 coins. Proof coins were typically delivered in a coin capsule along with a display box and a booklet explaining the beast's significance in heraldic art.

On February 18, 2016, Wholesale Direct Metals announced that they would be the exclusive North American distributor for the Royal Mint of the Lion of England bullion coins. By mid-2016, the coins were widely available for sale and trade from a variety of sources. The proof versions were widely available in December 2016.

== Common obverse ==
The obverse features the fifth definitive coinage portrait of Queen Elizabeth II, surrounded by the text "ELIZABETH II • D • G • REG • F • D • (2/5/10/25/100/500/1000) POUNDS". DG REG FD is an abbreviation of the Latin "Dei Gratia Regina Fidei Defensor," meaning "By the Grace of God, Queen, Defender of the Faith". It is a form of the style of the British sovereign of Queen Elizabeth II common on coins of the pound sterling. The initials of artist Jody Clark appear just below the portrait.

== Reverse on bullion coins ==
The reverse features a stylized rendition of the beast surrounded by the text "[BEAST'S NAME] • (¼/1/2/10) oz • FINE (GOLD/SILVER/PLATINUM) • 999.(5/9) • (2016/-/2021)". Jody Clark's initials appear just below the shield, offset either to the left or to the right.

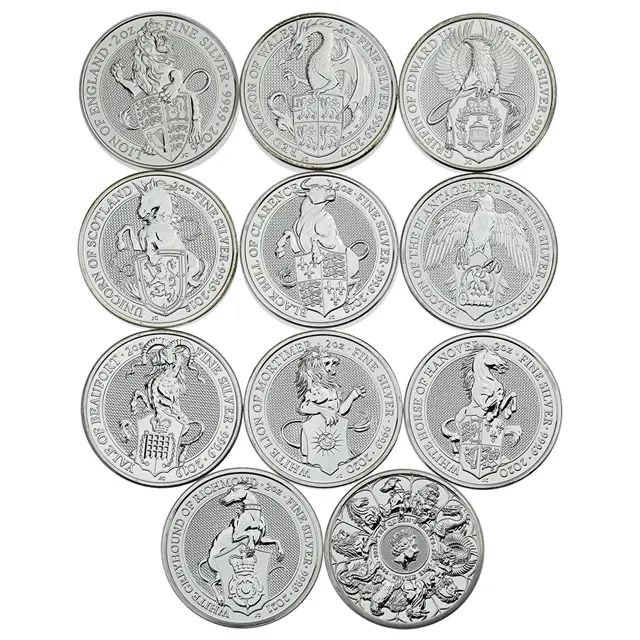
UK Queen's Beasts 2 Oz Coins

== Reverse on proof and brilliant uncirculated coins ==
The reverse features a slightly different stylized rendition of the beast from the bullion version, surrounded by the text "[BEAST'S NAME] • (2016/-/2021)". Jody Clark's initials appear within the shield, offset either to the left or to the right.

== I. Lion of England ==
The Lion of England is the first in the series of Queen's Beasts coins, released in March, 2016. The initial allocation of bullion coins from the Royal Mint sold out and were not available again until mid-June 2016. Proof versions were announced in November 2016.

== II. Griffin of Edward III ==
The Griffin of Edward III is the second in the series of Queen's Beasts bullion coins, released in 2017.

== III. Red Dragon of Wales ==
The Red Dragon of Wales is the third in the series of Queen's Beasts bullion coins, released in 2017.

== IV. Black Bull of Clarence ==
The Black Bull of Clarence is the fourth in the series of Queen's Beasts bullion coins, released 2018.

=== Obverse ===
Beginning with this fourth release, the obverse background of the bullion versions was changed from a stucco-like finish to an arcing pattern of many small diamonds.

== V. Unicorn of Scotland ==
The Unicorn of Scotland is the fifth in the series of Queen's Beasts bullion coins, released in 2018.

== VI. Yale of Beaufort ==
The Yale of Beaufort is the sixth in the series of Queen's Beasts bullion coins, released in 2019.

== VII. Falcon of the Plantagenets ==
The Falcon of the Plantagenets is the seventh in the series of Queen's Beasts bullion coins, released in 2019.

== VIII. White Lion of Mortimer ==
The White Lion of Mortimer is the eighth in the series of Queen's Beasts bullion coins, released in 2020

== IX. White Horse of Hanover ==
The White Horse of Hanover is the ninth in the series of Queen's Beasts bullion coins, released in 2020.

== X. White Greyhound of Richmond ==
The White Greyhound of Richmond is the tenth coin in this series, Released in 2021

== XI. The Completer Coin ==
The "Completer Coin" is a commemorative of the series and it brings together all ten of the Queen's Beasts on one coin. It is presented in non-bullion variants with a booklet detailing the fascinating history and symbolism behind each beast. Released in April 2021.

The Completer Coin introduced 2 kg and 10 kg gold versions featuring the popular Queen's Beasts designs for the first time, and this commemoration of the series does not include several versions in the actual series such as 1/4 oz gold in both proof and bullion formats.

== Royal Mint's pricing strategy on the Completer Coin ==
Analysis of the recommended retail price (RRP) for each of the Completer Coin variants at time of issue and comparing these with the intrinsic value provides an insight into Royal Mint's pricing strategy. The RRP changed throughout the series. The spot price per gram on 30 April 2021 for gold was £40.9; and for silver was £0.6.

Analysis of The Collector's Coin RRP and intrinsic value
Coin	RRP	Weight in grams	Intrinsic value at launch	Combined Royal Mint profit, manufacturing, distribution, and VAT (silver only) costs (RRP minus the intrinsic value of raw materials)
One ounce gold proof coin	£2,315	31.21	£1,276.49	£1,038.51
Five-ounce gold proof coin	£10,525	156.295	£6392.47	£4,132.53
Gold proof kilo coin	£63,380	1,005	£41,104.5	£22,275.5
Gold proof 2 kilo coin	£139,200	2,010	£82,209	£56,991
Gold proof 10 kilo coin	Price on application	10,005	£409,204.5	N/A
One ounce silver proof coin	£92.5	31.21	£18.73	£73.77
Five-ounce silver proof coin	£455	156.295	£93.78	£361.22
Ten-ounce silver proof coin	£865	312.59	£187.55	£677.45
Silver proof kilo coin	£2,270	1,005	£603	£1,667
£5 brilliant uncirculated coin	£13	28.28	est. £0.5	£12.5

The estimate of the intrinsic value of the £5 cupro-nickel coin is based upon the Royal Mint's statement made when making the business case to change the composition of the material used to produce the 10p coin from cupro nickel to steel. The statement made implied that the intrinsic value of the metal used was less than the face value of the 10p coin. When an economy uses a fiat currency, it is important that the face value of a coin is greater than the intrinsic value to prevent opportunists hoarding coins and then melting them for scrap to make a profit as was seen with the old copper 1p and 2p coins that had an intrinsic value 50% above their face value and thus the government were forced to replace them.

The intrinsic value of the 10p coin was widely reported as being close to the face value and given this, dividing a face value of old 10p by the weight of the cupro nickel in the coin (6.5 g), and multiplying that intrinsic value per gram by the weight of the £5 brilliant coin (£28.28), the estimate of about £0.5 was produced. This figure shows that The Royal Mint is able to produce, market, package and distribute a high quality coin and make a profit for under £12.5 a coin.

== Specifications ==
The following table contains specifications for each coin.

Quality	Purity	Metal	Edition	Face Value	Weight	Diameter
Bullion	.9999	Gold	1 oz	£100	31.21 g	32.69 mm
Bullion	.9999	Gold	¼ oz	£25	7.8 g	22 mm
Bullion	.9999	Silver	10 oz	£10	311.055 g	89 mm
Bullion	.9999	Silver	2 oz	£5	62.42 g	38.61 mm
Bullion	.9995	Platinum	1 oz	£100	31.21 g	32.69 mm
Proof	.999	Gold	10 kg	£10,000	10,005 g	200 mm
Proof	.999	Gold	2 kg	£2,000	2,010 g	150 mm
Proof	.999	Gold	1 kg	£1,000	1,005 g	100 mm
Proof	.9999	Gold	5 oz	£500	156.3 g	50 mm
Proof	.9999	Gold	1 oz	£100	31.21 g	32.69 mm
Proof	.9999	Gold	¼ oz	£25	7.8 g	22 mm
Proof	.999	Silver	1 kg	£500	1,005 g	100 mm
Proof	.999	Silver	10 oz	£10	312.59 g	65 mm
Proof	.999	Silver	5 oz	£10	156.3 g	65 mm
Proof	.999	Silver	1 oz	£2	31.21 g	38.61 mm
Brilliant Uncirculated	Cupro-nickel		1 oz	£5	28.28 g	38.61 mm

== Mintage ==
The following table has the most recent available information on the numbers of coins minted by year and design.

Position	Bullion Release Order	Obverse	Reverse	Bullion					Proof											Brilliant Uncirculated		
Position	Bullion Release Order	Obverse	Reverse	.9999				.9995	.999			.9999			.999					Cupro-nickel		
Position	Bullion Release Order	Obverse	Reverse	Gold		Silver		Platinum	Gold						Silver					Cupro-nickel		
Position	Bullion Release Order	Obverse	Reverse	1 oz	¼ oz	10 oz	2 oz	1 oz	10 kg	2 kg	1 kg	5 oz	1 oz	¼ oz	1 kg	10 oz	5 oz	1 oz	¼ oz (RP)	1 oz		
Position	Bullion Release Order	Obverse	Reverse	£100	£25	£10	£5	£100	£10,000	£2,000	£1,000	£500	£100	£25	£500	£10	£10	£2	50p	£5		
I	1	Queen Elizabeth II	Lion of England	2016; Unl.	2016; Unl.	2017; Unl.	2016; Unl.	2017; Unl.			2017; 25	2017; 125	2017; 1,000	2017; 2,500	2017; 600	2017; 1,250	2017; 2,500	2017; 8,500	2021; 1,250	2017; Unl.	2018; Ltd.	2019; Ltd.
II	4	Queen Elizabeth II	Unicorn of Scotland	2018; Unl.	2018; Unl.	2019; Unl.	2018; Unl.	2019; Unl.			2017; 13	2017; 85	2017; 475	2017; 1,500	2017; 225	2017; 850	2017; 750	2017; 6,250	2021; 1,250	2017; Unl.		
III	3	Queen Elizabeth II	Red Dragon of Wales	2017; Unl.	2017; Unl.	2018; Unl.	2017; Unl.	2018; Unl.			2018; 13	2018; 90	2018; 500	2018; 1,500	2018; 200	2018; 700	2018; 500	2018; 6,000	2021; 1,250	2018; Unl.		
IV	5	Queen Elizabeth II	Black Bull of Clarence	2018; Unl.	2018; Unl.	2019; Unl.	2018; Unl.	2019; Unl.			2018; 10	2018; 75	2018; 400	2018; 1,500	2018; 150	2018; 600	2018; 700	2018; 4,360	2021; 1,250	2018; Unl.		
V	6	Queen Elizabeth II	Falcon of the Plantagenets	2019; Unl.	2019; Unl.	2020; Unl.	2019; Unl.	2020; Unl.			2019; 13	2019; 85	2019; 445	2019; 1,250	2019; 125	2019; 400	2019; 550	2019; 5,650	2021; 1,250	2019; Unl.		
VI	7	Queen Elizabeth II	Yale of Beaufort	2019; Unl.	2019; Unl.	2020; Unl.	2019; Unl.	2020; Unl.			2019; 13	2019; 70	2019; 445	2019; 1,000	2019; 120	2019; 240	2019; 335	2019; 4,360	2021; 1,250	2019; Unl.		
VII	8	Queen Elizabeth II	White Lion of Mortimer	2020; Unl.	2020; Unl.	2021; Unl.	2020; Unl.	2021; Unl.			2020; 13	2020; 70	2020; 445	2020; 1,000	2020; 120	2020; 240	2020; 335	2020; 4,360	2021; 1,250	2020; Unl.		
VIII	9	Queen Elizabeth II	White Horse of Hanover	2020; Unl.	2020; Unl.	2021; Unl.	2020; Unl.	2021; Unl.			2020; Unl.	2020; 69	2020; 435	2020; 1,000	2020; 115	2020; 235	2020; 315	2020; 4,310	2021; 1,250	2020; Unl.		
IX	10	Queen Elizabeth II	White Greyhound of Richmond	2021; Unl.	2021; Unl.	2022 Unl	2021; Unl.	N/R			2021; 10	2021; 69	2021; 425	2021; 1,010	2021; 80	2021; 195	2021; 370	2021; 3,960	2021; 1,250	2021; Unl.		
X	2	Queen Elizabeth II	Griffin of Edward III	2017; Unl.	2017; Unl.	2018; Unl.	2017; Unl.	2018; Unl.			2021; 10	2021; 115	2021; 500	2021; 1,240	2021; 70	2021; 140	2021; 290	2021; 4,400	2021; 1,250	2021; Unl.		
XI	11	Queen Elizabeth II	The Completer Coin featuring all 10 of the Queen's Beasts	2021; Unl.			2021; Unl.		2021 1	2021 4	2021 16	2021 135	2021 625		2021 75	2021 125	2021 300	2021 7,100		2021; Unl.		

== See also ==
- Bullion
- Bullion coin
- Coins of the pound sterling
- Gold as an investment
- Inflation hedge
- List of British banknotes and coins
- Platinum as an investment
- Royal Mint
- Silver as an investment
- The Queen's Beasts
