= Wuon-Gean Ho =

British Chinese artist (born 1973)

- Born: 1973 (age 52–53); Oxford, United Kingdom
- Education: Cambridge University
- Notable work: Lunar coin series
- Awards: 2007 John Purcell Paper prize; 2009 Printmakers' Council prize; 2010 Birgit Skiöld Memorial Trust Award of Excellence

Wuon-Gean Ho (Chinese: 何文津; pinyin: hé wén jīn) (born 1973, Oxford) is a British Chinese artist who specialises in printmaking and whose work has appeared in various international art exhibitions and art collections. She has taken on art residencies at a number of institutions, including the Caldera Arts Center, Crow’s Shadow Institute of the Arts, Bluecoat Arts Centre and Aberystwyth School of Art. Examples of her work are displayed at both the National Art Library and the Tate Library. In 2014 she was commissioned by the Royal Mint to design their annual Lunar coin series for which she has done five years in a row.

== Biography ==
Wuon-Gean Ho was born in Oxford to Malaysian and Singaporean parents who moved to London in the 1960s to study. Her mother was a nurse and her father was a veterinary physician. She graduated in 1998 from Cambridge University with a degree in the History of Art and gained a license to practice veterinary medicine. After university she applied for a Japanese scholarship to study traditional woodblock printmaking in Kyoto and later returned to the UK to work in printing.

== Commissions ==
- Cover art for 2011 novel The Tiger's Wife
- Animal designs for the Royal Mint's Lunar coin series
