= Britannia (coin) =

British bullion coins

Britannia (One ounce silver)
- United Kingdom
- Value: 2 pounds sterling
- Mass: 32.45g (1997–2012); 31.21g (2013–present); g
- Diameter: 40.00mm (1997–2012); 38.61mm (2013–present day); mm
- Thickness: 3 mm (2013–present day) mm
- Edge: Milled
- Composition: .958 silver (1997–2012); .999 silver (2013–present)
- Years of minting: 1997–present

Obverse
- Design: Queen Elizabeth II
- Designer: Jody Clark
- Design date: 2015

Reverse
- Design: Britannia
- Designer: Philip Nathan
- Design date: 1987

The Britannia is a bullion coin issued by the Royal Mint. It has been minted in gold since 1987, in silver since 1997, and in platinum since 2018. The reverse of the coin patterns feature various depictions of Britannia, a feminine personification of Great Britain, while the obverse features the effigy of the monarch of the United Kingdom with the legend around it.

Britannia gold coins contain one troy ounce of gold and have a face value of £100. Up to 2012, the gold was 22 carat (0.917 gold), but since 2013 has been fine gold (0.9999 gold). The coins are also issued in fractional sizes of one-half, one-quarter, and one-tenth of a troy ounce and with face values of £50, £25, and £10 respectively. In 2013, two additional sizes were introduced, a five-ounce coin of face value £500, and a fractional size of one-twentieth of face value £5.

Britannia silver coins contain one troy ounce of silver and have a face value of £2. Silver Britannias also are issued in fractional sizes of one-half, one-quarter, and one-tenth of a troy ounce and with face values of £1, 50p, and 20p respectively. Like the gold coins in 2013, two additional sizes were introduced, a five-ounce coin of face value £10, and a fractional size of one-twentieth of face value 10p.

2023 marked the first year that King Charles III was depicted on the obverse. Queen Elizabeth II had featured on all previous ones.

== Gold Britannia ==
From 2013 the gold coins have a millesimal fineness of 0.9999 (or 24 carat gold). Until 2012 the gold coins have a millesimal fineness of 0.917 (91.7% or 22 carat gold) with the non-gold component being copper until 1989 and silver from 1990.

2013– Gold Britannia specifications (gold content and approx. total weight)

Five ounces: diameter 65 mm (156.295 g)
One ounce (2013) : diameter 38.61 mm (31.104 g) 'larger thinner coin' just for 2013
One ounce (2014–) : diameter 32.69 mm (31.104 g)
Half ounce: diameter 27 mm (15.60 g)
One quarter ounce: diameter 22 mm (7.86 g)
One tenth ounce: diameter 16.50 mm (3.13 g)
One twentieth ounce: diameter 12 mm (1.58 g)
One fortieth ounce: diameter 8 mm (0.80g)

1987–2012 Gold Britannia specifications (gold content, not total weight)

One ounce: diameter 32.69 mm (31.104 g; total wt 34.050 g)
Half ounce: diameter 27 mm, (15.552 g)
Quarter ounce: diameter 22 mm (7.776 g)
Tenth ounce: diameter 16.5 mm, (3.11 g)

Gold Britannias are struck to an unlimited mintage every year.

== Silver Britannia ==
The reverse design of the first silver Britannia from 1997

Since 2013 the silver coins have been produced with a millesimal fineness of 0.999 (99.9% silver). They have a mass of 31.21 grams and diameter of 38.61 mm.

From 1997 to 2012 the silver coins had a millesimal fineness of 958 (95.8% or Britannia silver). Total mass 32.45 grams, diameter 40.00 mm.

Silver Britannias have been released each year beginning in 1997, when a silver proof set was offered. In 1998 and in all subsequent even-numbered years the reverse design has depicted a standing Britannia figure. Beginning in 1999 and continuing in odd-numbered years, a series of alternate, non-repeating depictions of Britannia have replaced the standing figure on the reverse. Starting in 2013, the proof versions of the coin will feature a different design each year, while the bullion version of the coin will always feature the classic standing Britannia. While mintage was limited prior to 2013, in 2013 and after mintage of the bullion version of the coin is unlimited based on demand.

Some 2014 silver Britannia coins were struck with the incorrect obverse as there was a mix up during the manufacturing process with the 'Lunar' Year of the Horse coins from The Royal Mint, as both coins were to the same fineness and specification, and similar but not identical obverse sides. It is thought that there are around 17,000 examples with the mis-strike, which have been dubbed the 'Mule Britannia'. These coins have fetched substantial premiums on online auction sites.

=== Silver Britannia mintages ===
The following table has the most recent numbers of coins minted by year.

| Year | Uncirculated | 1 oz proof (orders / issue limit) | Proof sets (orders / issue limit) | 5 oz proof |
|---|---|---|---|---|
| 1997 (.958 Ag) | – | 16,005 | 11,832 | Not available |
| 1998 (.958 Ag) | 88,909 | 3,044 | 3,044 | Not available |
| 1999 (.958 Ag) | 69,394 | No proof coins released | No proof coins released | Not available |
| 2000 (.958 Ag) | 81,301 | No proof coins released | No proof coins released | Not available |
| 2001 (.958 Ag) | 44,816 | 4,596 | 10,000 | Not available |
| 2002 (.958 Ag) | 48,816 | No proof coins released | No proof coins released | Not available |
| 2003 (.958 Ag) | 73,271 | 2,016 / 5,000 | 3,669 / 5,000 | Not available |
| 2004(.958 Ag) | 100,000 | 2,174 / 5,000 | – | Not available |
| 2005(.958 Ag) | 100,000 | 1,539 / 2,500 | 2,360 / 3,500 | Not available |
| 2006(.958 Ag) | 100,000 | 2,529 / 2,750 | 3,000 / 3,000 (The Silhouette Collection encompasses five styles, which are 1 oz .999 silver & gold gilt) | Not available |
| 2007(.958 Ag) | 100,000 | 5,157 / 7,500 | 2,500 / 2,500 (Sold out) | Not available |
| 2008(.958 Ag) | 100,000 | 2,500 / 2,500 (Sold out) | 2,500 / 2,500 (Sold out) | Not available |
| 2009(.958 Ag) | 100,000 | 6,784 | 2,500 / 2,500 (Sold out) | Not available |
| 2010(.958 Ag) | 126,367 | 6,539 | 3,497 | Not available |
| 2011(.958 Ag) | 100,000 | 4,973 | 2,483 / 2,500 | Not available |
| 2012 (.958 Ag) | 100,000 | 2,500 | – | Not available |
| 2013 (.999 Ag) | Mint to order | 2,500 in limited edition presentation, maximum mintage 8,500 | – | 1,150 in limited edition presentation, 3,500 in First Strike Presentation, maximum mintage 4,650 |
| 2013 (.999 Ag) Snake privy rim | 300,000 | 0 | – | 0 |
| 2014 (.999 Ag) | Mint to order | 2,981 Individual mintage 2,285 Set mintage | 1,750 in limited edition presentation, 550 in First Strike Presentation | 600 in limited edition presentation, 750 in First Strike Presentation, maximum mintage 1,350 |
| 2014 (.999 Ag) Horse privy rim | 1,000,000 | 0 | – | 0 |
| 2015 (.999 Ag) | Mint to order | 4,240 Individual mintage 1,559 Set mintage | unknown | 995 limit |
| 2015 (.999 Ag) Ram privy rim | 200,000 | 0 | – | 0 |
| 2016 (.999 Ag) | Mint to order | 4,137 Individual mintage 1,300 Set mintage | unknown | 783 limit |
| 2016 (.999 Ag) Monkey privy rim | 176,300 | | – | 0 |
| 2017 (.999 Ag) | | 5,225 Individual mintage 1,351 Set mintage | | 656 Limit |
| 2017 (.999 Ag) Rooster privy rim | – | – | – | – |
| 2017 (.999 Ag) Dog privy rim | 1 mintage error known | – | – | – |
| 2018 (.999 Ag) Dog privy rim | – | – | – | – |
| 2018 (.999 Ag) | | 3,630 Individual mintage 937 Set mintage | | 430 Limit |
| 2019 (.999 Ag) | | 2,995 Individual mintage 999 Set mintage | | 340 limit |
| 2019 (.999 Ag) Pig privy rim | - | - | - | - |
| 2020 (.999 Ag) | | 4,960 Individual limit 1,000 Set limit | | 250 limit |
| 2020 (.999 Ag) Rat privy rim | – | – | – | – |
| 2021 (.999 Ag) | | 2,900 Individual limit 1,000 Set limit | | 250 limit |
| 2022 (.999 Ag) | | 3,500 Individual limit 3,300 Set limit | | 350 limit |
| 2023 (.999 Ag) | | 3,450 Individual limit 1,470 Set limit | | 420 limit |
| 2024 (.999 Ag) | | 3,500 Individual limit 2,100 Set limit | | 556 limit |

== Platinum Britannia ==
From 2018, platinum Britannias have been minted, with a millesimal fineness of 0.9995.

== Coin designs ==
| Year | Metal | Finish | Artist | Description | Comments |
|---|---|---|---|---|---|
| 1997 | Gold & Silver | Proof | Philip Nathan | Britannia riding horse-drawn chariot | |
| 1998 | Gold & Silver | Brilliant Uncirculated Proof | | Classic standing Britannia | |
| 1999 | Gold & Silver | Brilliant Uncirculated | Philip Nathan | Britannia riding horse-drawn chariot | In 1999, the silver Britannia repeated the Boudicca in chariot design used in 1997, but was only issued in the uncirculated bullion (non-proof) version, as opposed to 1997 when it was only issued in the proof version. |
| 2000 | Gold & Silver | Bullion Proof | | Classic standing Britannia | |
| 2001 | Gold & Silver | Bullion Proof | Philip Nathan | With lion, vertical text | This year features a new design, Britannia is shown standing, accompanied by a lion, similar to the Una and the Lion reverse used on the very rare 1839 £5 gold coins. |
| 2002 | Gold & Silver | Bullion Proof | | Classic standing Britannia | |
| 2003 | Gold & Silver | Bullion Proof | Philip Nathan | Britannia wearing a helmet with waves in the background | |
| 2004 | Gold & Silver | Bullion Proof | | Classic standing Britannia | |
| 2005 | Gold & Silver | Bullion Proof | Philip Nathan | Seated Britannia | features a seated figure of Britannia, similar to that used on halfpennies and farthings from 1672, which in turn reflects the original personification of Britannia on Roman coins of Hadrian. |
| 2006 | Gold & Silver | Bullion Proof | | Classic standing Britannia | |
| 2007 | Gold & Silver | Bullion Proof | Christopher Le Brun | Seated Britannia with lion | features a seated figure of Britannia, with large shield bearing the Union Flag (Union Jack), with a lion at her feet, and what looks like the white cliffs of Dover and a sailing yacht in the background. |
| 2008 | Gold & Silver | Bullion Proof | John Bergdahl | With large waves | This year's Britannia has a new design featuring Britannia on the beach, with giant waves and a lighthouse in the background. |
| 2009 | Gold & Silver | Bullion Proof | Philip Nathan | | The 2009 issue has reverted to the Chariot design last seen in 1999. |
| 2010 | Gold & Silver | Bullion Proof | Suzie Zamit | In Corinthian-style helmet | Designer Suzie Zamit says: "Britannia is a really important British icon and I wanted to create a design that represents her as a symbol of British liberties and democracy. I felt it was important to portray Britannia as strong - almost Amazonian - and courageous, but not overly warlike, more peaceful and protective".... Britannia wears a Corinthian-style helmet, emphasising her warlike spirit and is accompanied by a lion to symbolise courage. However, Britannia's serene gaze and the presence of an olive branch, also portrays the goddess as a protective defender of peace and modern British liberty and values. Her eastward looking gaze alludes to Britain's role in the EU and its presence in Afghanistan. |
| 2011 | Gold & Silver | Bullion Proof | David Mach | In front of large flag | David Mach talks about his challenge to make Britannia a contemporary image and not just appear nationalistic: 'I worked out a design with as much movement as I could for a small surface area; movement that would encourage people to turn the coin and watch the light shift over the surface like I had done with half-crowns as a boy. My design acts as a lenticular image. The flag and Britannia appear to move reflecting a contemporary Britain; a changing Britain; a Britain which is culturally on the move but still with plenty of reasons to wave the flag.' |
| 2012 | Gold & Silver | Bullion Proof | Philip Nathan | Classic standing Britannia | It draws its inspiration from a strongly maritime approach, Britannia windswept on a cliff-top, the very essence of authority and elegance. |
| 2013 | Gold & Silver | Proof | Robert Hunt | Britannia and the owl | her head appears turned, symbolizing an interest in lands beyond her borders. She wears a Corinthian helmet and holds Neptune's trident to represent her claim as "ruler of the waves". An owl is present as a symbol of wisdom. |
| 2014 | Gold & Silver | Proof | Jody Clark | Britannia with lion in front of globe | I wanted to include a lion in this Britannia portrayal too because I had decided upon a very feminine and elegant looking Britannia, and I needed the strong presence of the lion to balance the design out. I didn't want it to be overly soft and flowing. I don't think a lion had featured for a while either so I knew I wanted to include one in mine.... Why did you place the globe in the background – what is it – what does it represent? In my research I found that Britannia often sat on the globe in an imperial fashion. I didn't think that was a very modern concept. Instead, I decided to place it alongside her. I wanted to make the design appear as if Britannia is moving with the globe, and portray a sense of movement, with flowing elements like her dress. I thought it would be nice to have the contrast of static graphic elements too, like the globe. I found it a real balancing act getting the traditional aspects in whilst giving them a modern twist. |
| 2015 | Gold & Silver | Proof | Anthony Dufort | Corinth helmet and shield | Anthony looked back to Greek and Roman coins and statues to ensure authenticity while modelling her trident and Corinthian helmet. |
| 2016 | Gold & Silver | Proof | Suzie Zamit | Warrior Britannia with lion | Susie has brought her own perspective to Britannia, 'the warrior queen'. "I knew it was important to make Britannia immediately recognisable but I also tried to think about how she could represent Britain in the twenty-first century. Britannia represents British liberty and democracy, especially potent in times of national insecurity, so I wanted to portray her as a strong figure, almost Amazonian, proud, patriotic and courageous. She is reminiscent of the goddess 'Athena,’ a warrior but in a protective, peace-keeping way. "The shield, a symbol of protection and security, incorporates the Union Jack and I included the lion as national symbol of courage. Visually it is very strong, beautiful and watchful and also a symbol of protection. The inclusion of wind and sea reflect the more modern, forward thinking themes of renewable and green energy". |
| 2017 | Gold & Silver | Proof | Louis Tamlyn | British isles forming body 30th anniversary design | Louis created the design as a first year student at Central Saint Martins college when the Royal Mint requested a 'contemporary interpretation' of Britannia. Louis states: Britannia used to be the name of Great Britain in Roman times and hasn't really been used enough as a visual feature. I think it is important to revive it as a visual feature of the Britannia design as it communicates notions of the history and identity of Britain; by showing Britannia and the island as one it changes our perception. |
| 2018 | Gold & Silver | Proof | David Lawrence | In helmet with sunburst behind | Wears traditional British flowers around her helmet. Lawrence commented: "I wanted to create something with classical grace about it and a certain amount of gravitas: coins of the realm, especially when cast in valuable metals, are a serious business. I enrolled various family members to pose, bedecked with bedsheets and broomsticks for reference shots. It was then a matter of working through the compositions until some pleasing shapes could be resolved within the constriction of the coin's roundel". |
| 2019 | Gold & Silver | Proof Brilliant Uncirculated | David Lawrence | With lion, thrusting trident | David said of his of design: "My initial thoughts were influence by the great engravers of the past. Their work has a classical grace and gravitas I was keen to recreate. After all, coins of the realm are a serious business. The lion had to be there somewhere, as did the shield and trident... many of the components were already decided in a way. The result is an Anglicised version of ancient Rome". |
| 2020 | Gold & Silver | Proof Brilliant Uncirculated | James Tottle | Britannia in front of flag with lion on shield | James Tottle said of his design: "I felt that a strong pose with a striking silhouette of Britannia in the foreground alongside the Union flag in the background would produce a well-balanced image; I also wanted to feature the lion so I worked it onto the shield. The image needed some movement and drama so I used crashing wave and a billowing dress to achieve this". |
| 2021 | Gold & Silver | Proof | P.J. Lynch | Britannia with lion | |
| 2021 | Silver | Brilliant Uncirculated | P.J. Lynch | Contemporary Britannia in helmet looking out to sea | On Premium Exclusive only. P.J. Lynch said of his design: “For the Exclusive editions in the range, I decided it would be a good idea to go in close for a profile portrait of Britannia. I wanted her to look strong, resolute and attractive, but I also felt that her features should reflect something of the diversity of the people of Britain in the twenty-first century.” |
| 2022 | Silver | Proof | Dan Thorne | Britannia with trident and lion shield | Dan Thorne said of his design: “My goal with this coin was to merge a classical feel with something that appeals to a wider, modern audience. I put the figure in a three-quarter view that we don't normally see her in but kept the iconic distant gaze and proud stance. I wanted to have a fully 3D modelled Britannia but with the background in a flatter, graphic style in order to make her really stand out. I have included all the iconic imagery associated with Britannia – the lion, waves and flag – but, in a more subtle way. All these elements are surrounded by the beading that is reminiscent of older coins.” |
| 2022 | Gold | Proof 1 kg silver proof | Sandra Deiana | 3 figures of Britannia at different ages | Celebrating International Women's Day the design is inspired by Gustav Klimt's classic 1905 painting ‘The Three ages of Woman’ Ms Deiana said: “I particularly love the Britannia theme – it is the most difficult concept I have faced so far and I will always remain connected to it. No one had harmonised three female representations together. "I had to find a way to represent the Britannia icon in three different eras, through the three ages of woman.” |
| 2023 | Gold & Silver | Proof | Jonathan Olliffe | Britannia rides a chariot pulled by 2 horses with webbed feet for hooves. | Jonathan Olliffe said of his design: “Britannia should, of course, take centre stage, so she is positioned amongst the ocean waves whilst riding a sled-like chariot. A warrior queen, she is standing tall at the helm and holding onto the reigns of the two rearing sea creatures and pointing her trident forwards towards distant lands. “With a focus on Britannia as the female personification of the nation, it was important to capture a pose which expressed strength, power and beauty, but most importantly that conveyed her role as protector of the realm.” |
| 2024 | Gold & Silver | Proof | Marie-Alice Harel | Features Britannia in profile wearing a helmet with a lion emblem, facing towards a wave. | Marie-Alice Harel 'tried to imagine Britannia as a benevolent and peaceful protector, someone one could trust and turn to in challenging times.' “I wanted to represent Britannia as quite young in some of the designs to address the younger generations who are the future of the country. They will need those ideas of strength, peace and resilience to solve the problems of health, society and environment that we experience today. “Even though the idea of strength is central to the character, I did my best to show that this power is rooted in kindness, compassion and peace. For me, that's where true power lies and is what we need more of in the world. “This is why I was especially inspired by the symbol of the sea (to me, a reminder of environmental protection and climate change) and the presence of animals around Britannia (the symbolic lion).” |
| 2025 | Gold & Silver | Proof | Bradley Morgan Johnson | Features Britannia with trident and shield against a sea with a large sunburst emanating from behind her head | Bradley Morgan Johnson said, "I love Art Nouveau sculpture and took inspiration from a sculpture of Britannia in this style." “The figure of Britannia is strong; it’s clear what you’re looking at and who she is. The design is unfussy, and I’m really pleased that it’s streamlined and easy to read.” “This is the first coin that I’ve designed and sculpted myself. This is a big deal; I’ve been sculpting for a long time and it was good to have The Royal Mint trust in my ability to realise the design.” |
| 2026 | Gold & Silver | Proof | Emily Damstra | Britannia is depicted in a profile view with her traditional shield and trident with Longships lighthouse and waves in the background. “Majesty, Justice, and Peace” is inscribed at the bottom. | Artist Emily Damstra said, 'Nature is a great source of personal inspiration, so the possibility of the sea as a prominent element in my design appealed to me. Wanting to make both Britannia and her environment as dynamic as possible, I considered how a strong wind would animate her hair and create the waves that crash on the shores, and how the wind and waves could also symbolize the turbulent world we live in. The strength of Britannia in midst of the turmoil is evident' |

== See also ==
- American Gold Eagle
- Australian Gold Nugget
- British Sovereign coin
- Canadian Gold Maple Leaf
- Austrian Philharmonic
- Krugerrand
- Chinese lunar coins
- Gold as an investment
- Silver as an investment
