= Rat (zodiac) =

Sign of the Chinese zodiac

- "Rat" in regular Chinese characters
- Chinese: 鼠
Transcriptions
Standard Mandarin
- Hanyu Pinyin: shǔ
- Wade–Giles: shu^{3}
- IPA: [ʂù]
Hakka
- Romanization: chhú
Yue: Cantonese
- Yale Romanization: syú
- Jyutping: syu2
- IPA: [sy˧˥]
Southern Min
- Hokkien POJ: chhú
Eastern Min
- Fuzhou BUC: chṳ̄
Northern Min
- Jian'ou Romanized: chṳ̌
Old Chinese
- Baxter–Sagart (2014): *l̥aʔ

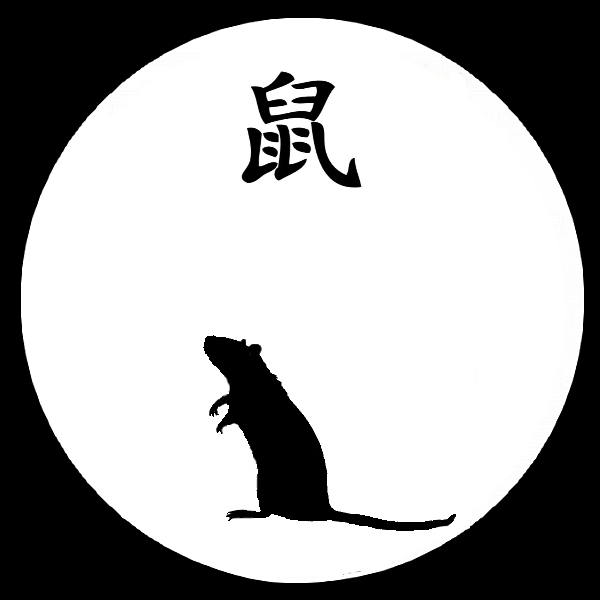
Zodiac rat, showing the shǔ (鼠) character for rat/mouse

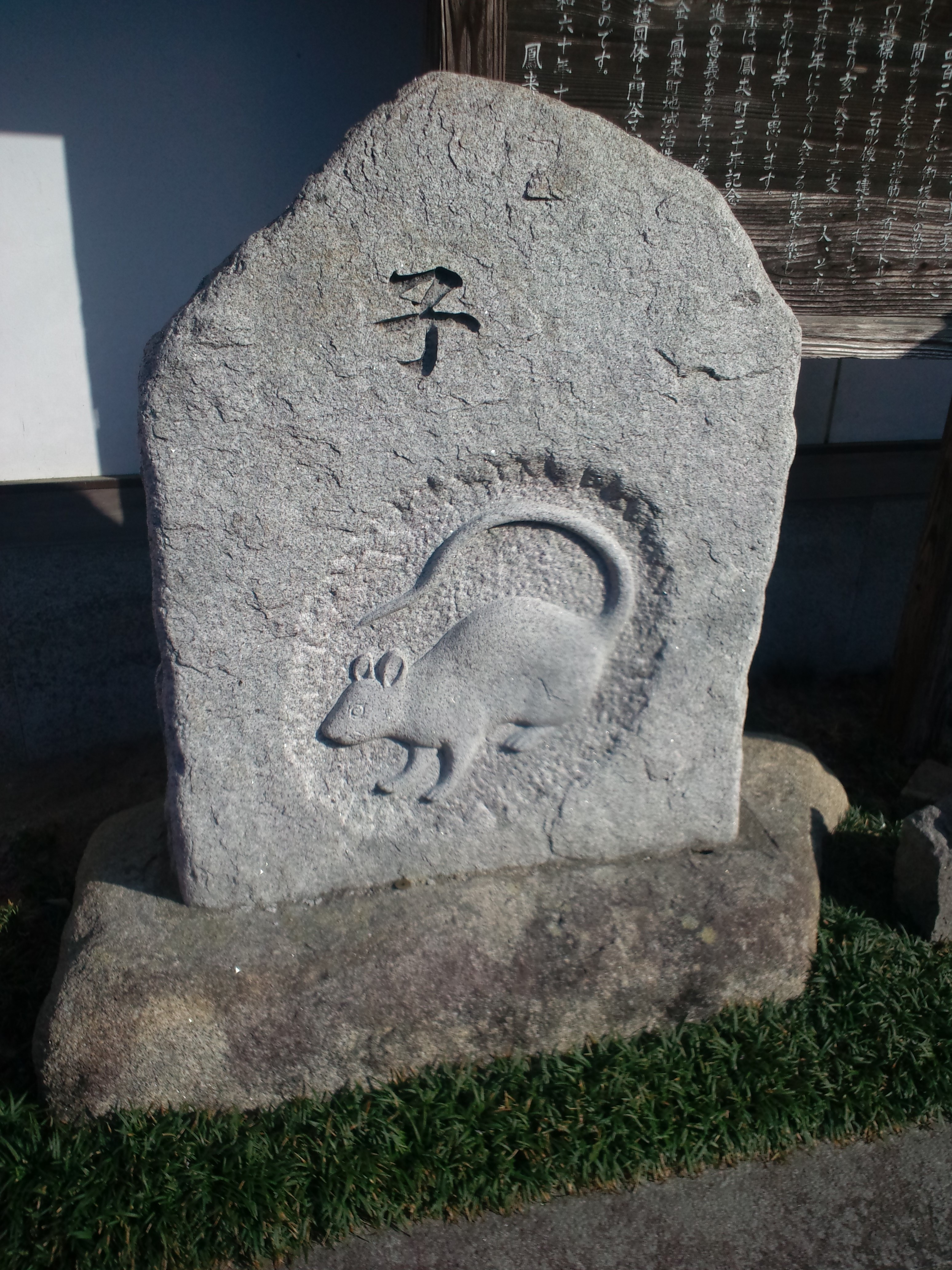
Stone monument with a carving of a mouse, at Mount Hôrai-ji Buddhist Temple, Aichi Prefecture, Japan, showing the zǐ (子) character designating the first of the twelve Earthly Branches

The Rat or Mouse (鼠) is the first of the repeating 12-year cycle of animals which appear in the Chinese zodiac, constituting part of the Chinese calendar system (with similar systems in use elsewhere).

The Year of the Rat in standard Chinese is Chinese: 鼠年; pinyin: shǔnián. The rat is associated with the first branch of the Earthly Branch symbol 子 (zǐ), which starts a repeating cycle of twelve years. There are also a yearly month of the rat and a daily hour of the rat (Chinese double hour, midnight, 11:00 p.m. to 1:00 a.m.). Years of the rat are cyclically differentiated by correlation to the Heavenly Stems cycle, resulting in a repeating cycle of five years of the rat (over a sixty-year period), each rat year also being associated with one of the Chinese wu xing, also known as the "five elements", or "phases": the "Five Phases" being Fire (火 huǒ), Water (水 shuǐ), Wood (木 mù), Metal (金 jīn), and Earth (土 tǔ).

== First Year of the Rat ==
The ancient shell end bone style Chinese character shǔ (鼠), for rat/mouse

In Chinese tradition, the first year was the equivalent of 2637 BCE (although others give other dates). The Prime Minister of the first emperor, Huangdi (also known as the Yellow Emperor), is said in this year to have worked out the sixty-year zodiacal cycle. Part of this achievement was the discovery and incorporation of the nineteen-year so-called Metonic cycle which correlates lunar and solar dates, as part of the system (using leap months).

== Years and the Five Elements ==
Sexagenary cycle years

People born within these date ranges can be said to have been born in the "Year of the Rat", while bearing the following elemental sign: The following is a chart of the dates of the Gregorian calendar.

Start date	End date	Heavenly branch
11 February 1804	30 January 1805	Wood Rat
23 January 1816	16 January 1817	Fire Rat
14 February 1828	3 January 1829	Earth Rat
2 February 1840	22 January 1841	Metal Rat
20 February 1852	3 February 1853	Water Rat
8 February 1864	26 January 1865	Wood Rat
26 January 1876	12 February 1877	Fire Rat
12 February 1888	30 January 1889	Earth Rat
31 January 1900	18 February 1901	Metal Rat
18 February 1912	5 February 1913	Water Rat
5 February 1924	23 January 1925	Wood Rat
24 January 1936	10 February 1937	Fire Rat
10 February 1948	28 January 1949	Earth Rat
28 January 1960	14 February 1961	Metal Rat
15 February 1972	2 February 1973	Water Rat
2 February 1984	19 February 1985	Wood Rat
19 February 1996	6 February 1997	Fire Rat
7 February 2008	25 January 2009	Earth Rat
25 January 2020	11 February 2021	Metal Rat
11 February 2032	30 January 2033	Water Rat
30 January 2044	16 February 2045	Wood Rat
15 February 2056	3 February 2057	Fire Rat
3 February 2068	22 January 2069	Earth Rat
22 January 2080	8 February 2081	Metal Rat
7 February 2092	26 January 2093	Water Rat

== Lunar Mansion ==
In traditional Chinese astrology as well as traditional Chinese astronomy the sky was mapped into various asterisms or what are sometimes referred to as Chinese constellations. This is actually more similar to the zodiac of Western astrology than is the 12-animal cycle. The stars along the plane of the ecliptic were divided into groups known as the Twenty-Eight Mansions. Because the moon during its monthly cycle could be observed to appear to move from one mansion (or "camp") into the next each night in turn, they are also known as Lunar Mansions. Traditionally, these mansions were divided into four groups of seven each, and associated with one of four spiritual entities. The rat is generally associated with the celestial region of the Mystical Warrior, or Xuánwǔ (玄武), and specifically with the mansion Xū (虛), which in turn is associated with the direction North and the darkest part of the winter season, in the northern hemisphere. (Xū (虛) is more-or-less equivalent to Beta Aquarii, also known as Sadalsuud).

== Hour of the Rat ==
In old Chinese tradition, the hours of a day-night period were divided into 12 double-hours, each corresponding to one of the twelve signs of the Chinese zodiac, with similar symbolic motif and astrological significance. The first of the twelve double hours encompasses midnight, at the middle of the double hour, corresponding with 11:00 p.m. to 1:00 a.m., with midnight being the midpoint of the first double-hour, which is the Hour of the Rat, or the hour zǐ (子).

== Popular culture ==
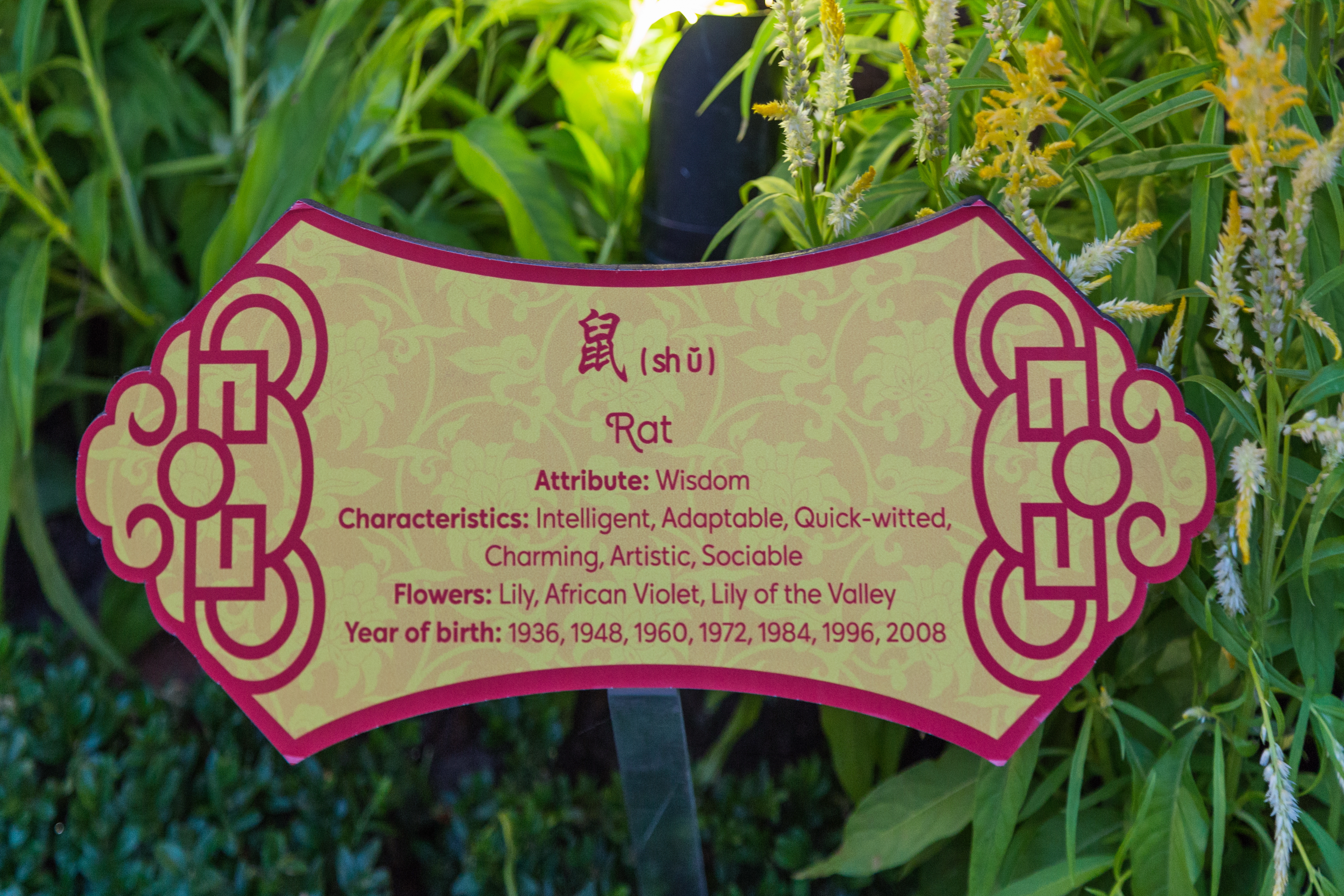
A sign in Gardens by the Bay, Singapore, 2016

In popular culture, the zodiacal idea of year of the rat is associated with various beliefs about prognostications for the upcoming year, lucky numbers, lucky colors, auspicious romantic connections, similarities between persons born in those years, correlations between Chinese astrology and Western astrology and the like. Traditional Chinese astrology and horoscope has paid much more attention to the Heavenly Stems and Earthly Branches than to the zoology or symbolism of the 12 animals; rather the reference to the animals was more of a way of horology, keeping track of time. Nevertheless, modern times have shown an increased interest in the zodiacal animals, with a great deal of popular interest, in various places of the world. In any case, the rat has long been associated with keen and quick intelligence.

== Basic astrology elements ==
Earthly Branches of Birth Year:	子 Zi
The Five Elements:	Water
Cardinal Point:	North (N)
Yin / Yang:	Yang
Lunar Month:	December 6 to January 7
Season:	Winter
Earthly Branch Ruling Hours:	11:00 p.m. to 12:59 a.m
Twelve Heavenly Generals:	Sanskrit: Kiṃbhīra (Hanzi: 宮毘羅)
Lucky Flowers:	Lily of each and every species
Lucky Numbers:	1, 3, 6, 8; Avoid: 4, 5, 9
Lucky Colors:	black, gold, blue, green; Avoid: yellow, brown
Lucky/Associated Countries:	Germany, Austria, Israel, Argentina, Sweden, Iran

== The Jade Emperor and the race for zodiacal place ==
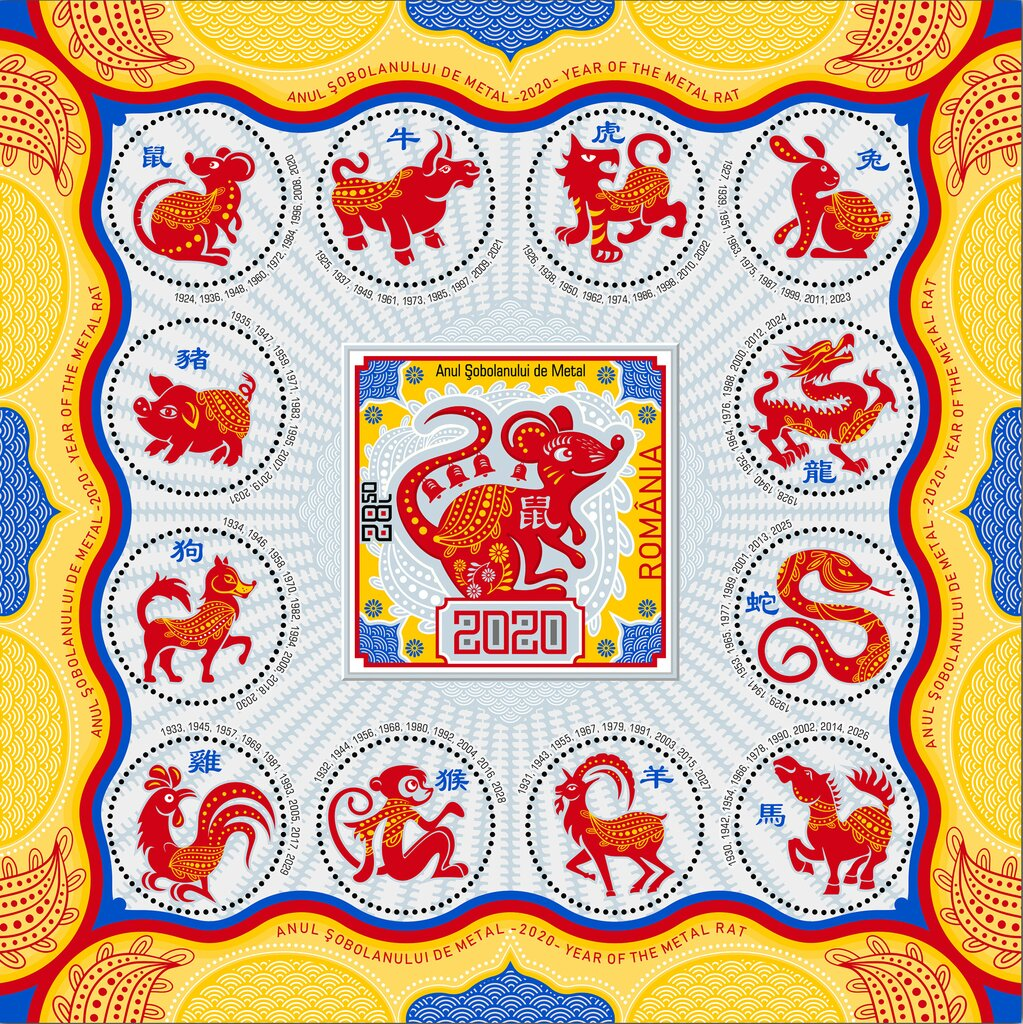
The rat and the other animals as shown on a Romanian postage stamp

A popular modern story has it that the order of the animals in the twelve-year cycle was due to a competition between animal candidates, held by the ruler of Heaven, Earth, and Hell — the Jade Emperor. According to one version of this tale, the emperor's advisors selected twelve candidates from among the animal types, including the rat and the cat. The winner was to be selected based upon merit, as to personal appearance, lifestyle, and contributions to the world. Before the competition, the cat asked the rat for a wake up call in order to get to the show on time; however, the rat apprehensive of the competition, especially as to the cat's apparent beauty, did not wake the cat, who then overslept (and, ever afterwards, the embittered cat became a ratter and a mouser). The Jade Emperor, mystified as to why only eleven candidate animals showed up, inquired of his servants. These servants hastily acquired the first possible replacement animal which they encountered, (a pig). After the start of the competition, the rat achieved first place by performing on the flute while upon the back of the ox. Impressed, the Jade Emperor placed the rat at the beginning of the twelve-year cycle (and the ox second, for being so generous as to allow the rat to play the flute upon the ox's back). Then the other animals were placed in order according to the Jade Emperor's judgment.

== The zodiacal rat around the world ==
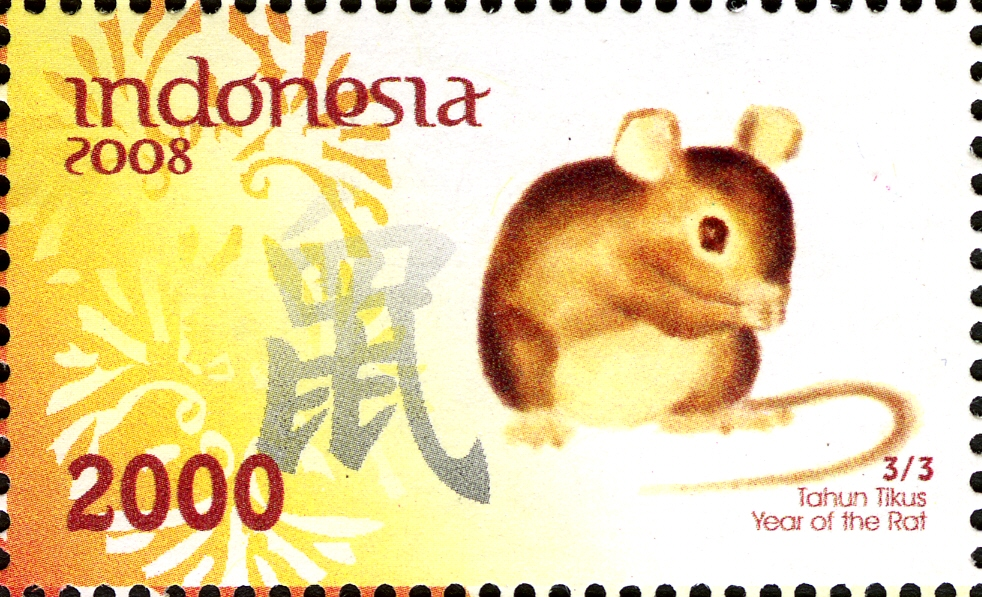
Postal stamp issued in Indonesia, commemorating the Year of the Rat/Mouse, 2008

The zodiacal rat is known in other cultures besides China, in Asia and beyond. Generally, the rat/mouse is the first of a twelve-year animal cycle, although some of the other animals tend to vary. In Japan, the rat is known as nezumi, and is the first in a twelve-year zodiacal cycle of animals. The Year of the Rat and the years of the subsequent other zodiacal animals is celebrated during Chinese New Year, in many parts of the world, with the animal appropriate to each new year serving as an artistic motif for decorations. The Rat and other zodiacal animals are also a popular motif on Chinese lunar coins and other coin series minted by various countries and also on various internationally issued postage stamps.

In English, Rat Years are sometimes referred to as Mouse Years instead, although in Chinese there is no distinction between the terms.

== See also ==
- Burmese zodiac
- Chinese astrology
- Chinese calendar

== Further reading and references consulted ==
- Alston, Isabella and Kathryn Dixon (2014). Chinese Zodiac. (China: TAJ Books International) ISBN 978-1-84406-246-1
- Hale, Gill (2002). The Practical Encyclopedia of Feng Shui. New York: Barnes and Noble Books. ISBN 0-7607-3741-X
- Wu, Zhonxian and Karin Wu (2014, 2016). Heavenly Stems and Earthly Branches:TianGan DiZhi. London and Philadelphia: Singing Dragon. ISBN 978-1-84819-208-9
