= Exchange-traded note =

Type of debt security issued by an underwriting bank or special-purpose entity

An exchange-traded note (ETN) is a senior, unsecured, unsubordinated debt security issued by an underwriting bank or by a special-purpose entity. Similar to other debt securities, ETNs may have a maturity date and are backed by the credit of the issuer, though some ETNs may have a portfolio of assets given as a collateral.

ETNs are designed to provide investors access to the returns of various market benchmarks. The returns of ETNs are usually linked to the performance of a market benchmark, a so-called market-linked note, or to the performance of an active investment strategy, in this case being called an actively managed certificate or performance-linked bond. In all cases, the returns are net of expenses and management fees.

When an investor buys an ETN, the issuer promises to pay the amount reflected in the index net of expenses and fees upon maturity (though in some cases the ETN may be perpetual, and the investor will get their investment back by selling it in the secondary markets). Thus an ETN has an additional risk compared to an exchange-traded fund (ETF); if the credit rating of the issuer is compromised, the investment might lose value in the same way that a senior debt would.

Often linked to the performance of a market benchmark, ETNs are not equities, equity-based securities, index funds or futures. Although ETNs are usually traded on an exchange and can be sold short, owners of ETNs don't actually own any underlying assets of the indices or benchmarks they are designed to track.

The first documented case across the globe of an ETN was the case of Tali-25, an ETN developed and issued in Israel in May 2000 by Ofek Leumi Financial Instruments. That ETN tracked a basket of multiple securities traded on the Tel Aviv Stock Exchange.

== Structure ==
The returns of ETNs are linked to the performance of a market benchmark or strategy, less investor fees.

As discussed previously, ETNs are debt notes. When held to maturity, the investor will receive a cash payment that is linked to the performance of the corresponding index during the period beginning on the trade date and ending at maturity, less investor fees. Typically, ETNs do not offer principal protection.

ETNs could also be liquidated before their maturity by trading them on the exchange or by redeeming a large block of securities directly with the issuer. A redemption charge may apply, subjected to the procedures described in the relevant prospectus.

The investor fee is calculated cumulatively based on the yearly fee and the performance of the underlying index and increases each day based on the level of the index or currency exchange rate on that day. Because the investor fee reduces the amount of return at maturity or upon redemption, if the value of the underlying decreases or does not increase significantly, the investor may receive less than the principal amount of investment at maturity or upon redemption.

Since ETNs are unsecured, unsubordinated debts, their risk is that of bonds of similar priority in the company's capital structure. Often issued off medium-term note shelves, ETNs would be pari passu with other debt issued off the same shelf. Therefore, ETNs are backed by the credit of the underwriting issuer. Like other debt securities, ETNs do not have voting rights. Unlike other debt securities, interest is not paid during the term of most ETNs.

== Advantages ==
=== Tax efficiency ===
An ETN offers a tax efficient way to invest. It is treated as a prepaid contract (such as a forward contract) for tax purposes. The buyer of a prepaid contract pays an initial amount in order to receive a future payment based on the value of an index or other underlying benchmark at a specified future time.

Very often index mutual funds and ETFs are required to make yearly income and capital gains distributions to its fund holders that are taxable. When a fund is forced to sell stock to rebalance or otherwise change its composition, the fund holders have to pay any resulting capital gains tax.

With ETNs, in contrast, there is no interest payment or dividend distribution, which means there is no annual tax. Capital gain (or loss) is realized when an investor sells the ETN or it matures. Long-term capital gains are treated more favorably than short-term capital gains and interest in the US (> 1 year holdings are taxed at a capital gains rate of 20%). There is no way to avoid paying capital gains tax, but there can be great advantage in wealth building by delaying it.

Recent tax rulings have suggested that ETNs may be qualified tax shelters for the purpose of changing current interest income into deferred capital gains income.

=== No tracking error ===
ETNs give investors a broad-based index without any tracking error to the index, doing away with the discrepancies that exist between the returns of many ETFs and their underlying indexes. One reason of the tracking error observed in ETFs might be attributed to the diversification issues that stem from the inability of a fund to replicate an index due to an upper limit on the maximum asset allocation to a single stock. But for ETN, this constraint does not exist, because though ETN is also tracking the index, the return is not based on the underlying securities. The ETN issuer guarantees the holder a return that is an exact replica of the underlying index, minus expense fees. The bank also agrees to pay large shareholders the exact value of the note on a weekly basis through redemption, which helps the ETNs track very closely to the underlying index return.

=== Liquid structured product ===
ETNs are a significant innovation to improve liquidity of structured products. Unlike other buy-and-hold structured products, ETNs can be bought and sold during normal trading hours on the securities exchange. For institutional size redemption, investors may offer their ETN for repurchase by the issuer on a weekly basis. Investors can easily track the performance of their ETN. In this sense, ETNs are structured to resemble ETFs. But ETNs are different from ETFs, as they consist of a debt instrument with cash flows derived from the performance of an underlying asset – a structured product.

=== Access to new markets and strategies ===
ETNs have provided access to hard-to-reach exposures, such as commodity futures and the Indian stock market. Certain asset classes and strategies are not easily accessible to individual investors. For example, the momentum investing strategy, which is used in SPECTRUM Large Cap U.S. Sector Momentum Index, is to take advantage of the varied performances of the 10 sub-indexes of the S&P 500 Total Return IndexSM (SPTR) relative to each other and to the SPTR. The weights of the 10 sub-indexes are computed each day based on performance and correlation. This makes SPECTRUM Large Cap U.S. Sector Momentum Index difficult to track through ETF. On the contrary, ETN provides opportunities to gain exposure to these types of investment strategies in a cost-efficient way.

=== Possibility of leverage ===
Some of the ETNs offer leverage instead of directly tracking a benchmark's performance. For instance, the DGP ETN offered by Deutsche Bank moves in the same direction as gold, but involves double leverage - it replicates twice the returns of holding gold. If gold gains 1%, the note gains 2%. Consequently, if gold goes down by 1%, the note loses 2%. Such characteristics make ETNs suitable for experienced investors willing to take on additional risk in hope of a higher return.

== Disadvantages ==
=== Credit risk and lack of risk metrics ===
ETNs, as debt instruments, are subject to risk of default by the issuing bank as counter party. This is the major design difference between ETFs and ETNs: ETFs are only subject to market risk whereas ETNs are subject to both market risk and the risk of default by the issuer. Even though the possibility of default turning into a reality is relatively low, it ought to be measured and accounted for. Given that good risk management practices involve measuring the level of credit risk of an investment that is subject to such a risk, the lack of a centralised credit risk database for ETN issuers may pose a challenge to making the ETN market fully developed, especially in the case of ETNs that are not issued by banks.

=== Illiquidity ===
ETNs have less trades at the secondary market than ETFs. Hence, they are naturally more illiquid.

=== Tax benefits speculative ===
The ETN issuers are using tax efficiency as their trump card. As things stand, there is significant tax saving to be gained from investing in ETNs. In reality, however, the Internal Revenue Service has yet to decide on the proposed tax treatment. So, the tax benefit status is still arguable.

=== Dependence on credit ratings ===
ETNs have their worth decided by two factors:

- Performance of the index they are set to track
- Credit ratings of the issuer

Suppose the issuing bank has been impacted negatively, if only marginally, by a crisis like the 2008 subprime mortgage crisis and the ratings agencies depreciate the overall credit rating of the issuer to reflect the event. In this hypothetical case, even though the index it is tracking is showing growth, a decline in rating of an ETN issuing financial institution could negatively impact the worth of an ETN.

=== Unprofitable trading strategies ===
The S&P GSCI has lost nearly 20% of its value since January 2006, despite soaring commodity prices, all thanks to contango. This is one instance where ETN tracked commodity indices like GSCI have ended up doing exactly the opposite of what they had set out to do.

The UBS Bloomberg Constant Maturity Commodity Index (CMCI) addresses the issues of contango and backwardation by introducing the concept of constant maturity, which provides diversification across futures contract maturity dates. This is intended to smooth out the volatility often associated with commodity investments.

== See also ==
- Exchange-traded product
