= Tax efficiency =

Economic theory evaluates how taxes are able to provide the government with required amount of the financial resources (fiscal efficiency) and what are the impacts of this tax system on overall economic efficiency. If tax efficiency needs to be assessed, tax cost must be taken into account, including administrative costs and excessive tax burden also known as the dead weight loss of taxation (DWL). Direct administrative costs include state administration costs for the organisation of the tax system, for the evidence of taxpayers, tax collection and control. Indirect administrative costs can include time spent filling out tax returns or money spent on paying tax advisors.

Achieving an ideal tax system is not possible in practice. However, there is an effort to find the optimal form of taxation. For example personal income taxation should guarantee a high level of equity through progressiveness.

A financial process is said to be tax efficient if it is taxed at a lower rate than an alternative financial process that achieves the same end.

Passing one's assets onto one's heirs using a Grantor Retained Annuity Trust, for example, is potentially more tax efficient than simply letting the heirs inherit the assets directly.

== Tax effects ==
Each tax has two effects:

=== Income effect ===
Income effect expresses the fact that entity's tax deducts part of its disposable income, either directly or by forcing to pay a higher price for the goods consumer. Every tax has this effect. Its size depends on the amount of the tax. It grows with the growth of the average (effective) tax rate.

=== Substitution effect ===
Substitution effect means that the taxpayer changes their preferences as their marginal benefits from the consumption of goods, income, labor, leisure, etc. Only flat taxes do not cause this effect. Its size depends on the marginal tax rate. The higher is the marginal rate, the higher is the substitution effect. Consumers will naturally prefer the goods which price dropped/stayed the same, since the price of other goods is the same/increased as an effect of imposing a tax. Their response is labeled as substitution effect, where the quantity demanded changes because of the relative change in price.

== Impact of taxes ==
The important question is who actually pays the tax. It does not always have to be the entity that pays the state taxes. By the tax impact is meant who ultimately pays a certain tax meaning who is subject to the tax burden.

The tax subject can shift its cost to other entity (tax shift forward to consumer - VAT, backward shift of the tax to supplier or even employee). The possibility of using the tax shift is given by the flexibility of demand and supply in the market of goods on which the tax is imposed. If demand is relatively inelastic, it is easier for sellers to shift the tax to the buyer. However, if the demand is relatively inflexible, the tax will fall on the seller. The targets of the tax may coincide with its real effects. For example taxing luxury goods may result in a reduction of the revenues of luxury goods producers, not an actual increase in the tax revenue.

== Costs of taxation ==
Taxes can also have economic and social costs aside from the cost of the tax itself. These costs can arise from administering and collecting taxes. It is important for policymakers to consider the costs of taxation whilst designing efficient tax policies. In countries where the costs of taxation are too high (tax policies are inefficient), tax avoidance and tax evasion rates can be high. We can categorise these costs:

=== Efficiency costs ===
Taxes alter the incentives of economic agents and thus affect production decisions. Higher taxes make goods and services more expensive meaning individuals, firms and governments will search for alternatives. For example, higher taxes on incomes reduce the incentives of individuals to invest which can have long-term impacts on the productivity of the economy.

Efficiency costs can be quantified using marginal efficiency cost (MEC). MEC tells us the cost of raising $1 of tax through the use of different types of tax. For example: if capital tax has a MEC of $0.50 then it costs the government $0.50 to collect $1 from capital taxes. Marginal efficiency cost of taxes can help policymakers to decide what to implement taxes on by pursuing taxes with a low MEC.

Historical estimates of MEC show that taxes on consumption tend to have a significantly lower MEC than taxes on income. This is because taxing consumption does not create as many disincentives as taxing peoples incomes.

=== Deadweight loss ===
Taxation leads to a reduction in the economic well-being known as deadweight loss. This loss occurs because taxes create disincentives for production. The gap between taxed and the tax-free production is the deadweight loss. Deadweight loss reduces both the consumer and producer surplus. The magnitude of deadweight loss depends on the elasticities of supply and demand for the taxed good or service.

=== Equity-efficiency trade-off ===
Progressivity is an important concept when evaluating tax efficiency. A progressive tax system is one in which the average tax rate increases as the taxable amount increases. The idea behind a progressive tax is to lessen the tax burden on people with a lower ability to pay, as they have lower incomes. Progressive taxes are generally seen as promoting equity and social welfare by reducing income inequality. However, there can be potential trade-offs between progressivity and tax efficiency. As taxes become more progressive, there may be increasing disincentives for higher-income individuals to work or invest, as they face higher marginal tax rates. This can lead to a decrease in overall economic activity and potential deadweight loss, reducing tax efficiency. Policymakers need to find a balance between progressivity and efficiency when designing tax systems in order to minimize these trade-offs and maintain economic growth while promoting social welfare.

=== Compliance costs ===
It can be expensive to hire tax consultants or tax software, especially for smaller businesses and individuals. Compliance costs refer to the costs associated with complying or adhering to tax regulations. This includes the costs of book keeping, reporting, calculating and remitting tax payments. It is more difficult to quantify compliance costs relative to efficiency costs.

=== Administrative costs ===
Effective tax policies are crucial in maximizing the governments tax revenue. This fact is represented in the Laffer curve, where a too high tax rate can lead to lower tax revenues than the optimal tax rate. Policymakers need to devote a lot of attention to designing efficient tax policies and administering them. The costs associated with collecting, administering and managing tax collection systems are referred to as the administrative costs of taxation. Administrative costs are incurred by the government but are eventually borne by the citizens in the form of higher taxes.

== Reducing costs of taxation ==
As discussed in the previous section, taxation can have other economic and social costs which affect the incentives of economic agents and alter economic behavior. For these reasons it is pivotal for policymakers to reduce these associated costs in designing an efficient tax system to maximise tax revenues. Here are some possible approaches to minimizing costs of taxation:

=== Simplification of tax laws ===
This can help to reduce compliance costs for individuals and businesses as well as administrative costs for governments. Tax laws can be simplified by minimizing the complexity of tax laws and standardizing tax filing requirements.

=== Use of technology ===
With the emergence of more technical tax software, the process of filing and paying taxes can be automated. This can be cheaper than the alternative of hiring expensive tax consultants and specialists. The use of technology can simplify the process of collecting taxes.

=== Reducing tax rate ===
Reducing tax rates can lower the marginal efficiency cost of taxation. Lower tax rates will thus lower the disincentives created by taxation and lower the deadweight loss allowing higher investment and economic activity. Conversely, reducing tax rates too much may lead to insufficient revenue generation, which could negatively impact public services and government functions.

=== Improving tax efficiency ===
Tax efficiency can be improved by taxing areas with lower marginal efficiency cost. As discussed earlier, taxes on incomes and profits are likely to have a higher MEC than taxes on consumption.

=== Increasing transparency ===
Transparency of taxes can be improved by providing clear and accessible information about tax laws and regulations and how tax revenues are utilised by the government. This can help to reduce compliance and administrative costs.

== Laffer curve ==
In economics, the Laffer curve is a theoretical relationship between rates of taxation and the resulting levels of the government's tax revenue. If the tax rates are too high, discouraging labor and investment, a reduction in tax rates may in fact lead to an increase in government tax revenues, because it will encourage the entities to work and invest.

As the picture shows, the Laffer curve tells us that the government's tax revenue is zero for tax rates 0% and 100%. In the middle the revenue is steadily increasing until a certain point from where it starts to decrease back to zero.

The government officials try to predict the behavior of taxpayers and therefore the consequences of tax reforms on the revenue. Understanding the mechanism is a great advantage during the times of deficit, since the government needs higher revenue and raising taxes can be seen by some as a solution. Critics of tax increases often stand by the fact that increases in tax rates make only small positive changes because of peoples' tendency to avoid taxation. Therefore, the little effect which it has on the revenue is negligible. Others could argue that not everyone would try to decrease the tax base (decrease the amount of the tax), since they have no way to do so. For example, corporate employees receive their income in a form of wage, which is a stable amount of money.

At the Laffer point (T*), tax revenue no longer increases; on the contrary, as the tax rate increases further, revenue decreases. This is due to the fact that taxpayers refuse to pay high taxes to the state and look for alternative solutions (headquarters in other countries, money laundering, shadow economy).

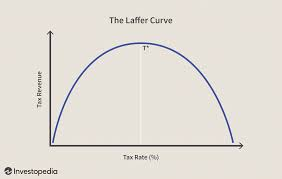
Laffer curve

== Behavioural responses to taxation ==
Tax efficiency can be influenced by how individuals and businesses respond to changes in tax policies. Behavioral responses to taxation can vary widely, depending on factors such as income level, occupation, and the specific type of tax being changed. Some individuals may adjust their work hours, consumption patterns, or savings and investment strategies in response to tax changes, while others may not respond at all. Businesses may respond to tax changes by altering their production levels, employment decisions, or pricing strategies. Understanding these behavioral responses is crucial for policymakers when designing and evaluating tax policies, as the actual impacts of tax changes on revenue generation and economic activity may differ from their intended effects due to these behavioral adjustments. Researchers often use empirical studies and economic models to estimate these behavioral responses and inform policy decisions.

== See also ==
- Consent of the governed
- Economic justice
- Taxation as theft
