= Exchange-traded product =

Umbrella term for ETFs, ETNs and related exchange-traded investment products

An exchange-traded product (ETP) is an umbrella term for an investment product that is listed and traded on a securities exchange and that typically seeks to provide exposure to the performance of an index, benchmark, asset class, or investment strategy. The term is not defined identically in every jurisdiction or market. In the United States, the U.S. Securities and Exchange Commission describes ETPs as including exchange-traded funds (ETFs), exchange-traded commodity trusts, and exchange-traded notes (ETNs). FINRA describes ETPs as including ETFs, ETNs, commodity pools, and other product types.

ETPs trade throughout the trading day at market prices, similarly to ordinary shares, but their value is generally linked to an underlying portfolio, benchmark, asset, or strategy rather than to the business prospects of an operating company. Individual exchange-listed stocks and bonds are therefore not usually described as ETPs.

== Characteristics ==
ETPs generally combine features of investment funds and exchange-listed securities. Like shares of stock, they can be bought and sold on an exchange during market hours, and their prices may fluctuate throughout the day. Many ETPs, particularly ETFs, also involve a primary-market creation and redemption process, often through broker-dealers or other institutional market participants, while most retail trading occurs in the secondary market.

ETPs may be index-tracking or actively managed. They may provide exposure to equities, bonds, commodities, currencies, crypto assets, volatility, or other benchmarks and strategies. Some ETPs hold a portfolio of assets, while others are debt instruments or trust interests whose return is linked to a reference asset or index. Because these structures differ, ETPs may have different costs, tax treatment, investor protections, and risks.

== Types ==
=== Exchange-traded funds ===
An exchange-traded fund (ETF) is a pooled investment fund whose shares are listed and traded on an exchange. In the United States, ETFs are registered with the SEC as open-end investment companies or unit investment trusts under the Investment Company Act of 1940. ETFs may track an index or be actively managed. Unlike traditional mutual funds, ETF shares usually trade throughout the day at market prices rather than being bought and redeemed by retail investors at end-of-day net asset value (NAV).

=== Exchange-traded notes ===
An exchange-traded note (ETN) is an unsecured debt obligation, typically issued by a bank or other financial institution, whose return is linked to the performance of a reference index or benchmark. Unlike an ETF, an ETN generally does not hold a portfolio of underlying assets. Investors in ETNs are exposed both to the performance of the referenced benchmark and to the credit risk of the issuer.

=== Commodity, currency, and crypto-asset ETPs ===
Some ETPs provide exposure to physical commodities, commodity futures, currencies, or crypto assets. In the United States, many commodity, currency, and crypto-asset ETPs are not registered as investment companies under the Investment Company Act of 1940, even when they are commonly referred to as ETFs or funds. Commodity ETPs may be structured as grantor trusts, commodity pools, or other vehicles, depending on the assets held and the applicable regulation.

In Europe, the term exchange-traded commodity (ETC) is commonly used for exchange-traded securities that track commodities such as precious metals, industrial metals, energy, or agricultural products. Deutsche Börse describes ETCs and ETNs as exchange-traded debt securities within the broader ETP group; ETCs are often collateralized by physical deposits or other collateral, while ETNs may be collateralized or uncollateralized.

Crypto-asset ETPs may be futures-based products or spot products that hold crypto assets directly. In the United States, spot bitcoin and spot ether ETPs are generally structured as exchange-traded commodity trusts rather than ETFs registered under the Investment Company Act of 1940.

=== Leveraged and inverse ETPs ===
Leveraged and inverse ETPs seek to provide a multiple of, or the opposite of, the performance of an index, asset, or benchmark over a stated period. Many such products are designed to achieve their stated objectives on a daily basis and reset their exposure each day. Over periods longer than one day, their returns can differ significantly from the stated multiple or inverse of the benchmark's cumulative return, especially in volatile markets. The United Kingdom's Financial Conduct Authority describes leveraged and inverse products that reset daily as examples of complex ETPs.

=== Other classification terms ===
Some international classifications also use terms such as exchange-traded instrument (ETI) and exchange-traded vehicle (ETV) for other exchange-traded structures. Usage varies, and these terms are not always used consistently across jurisdictions, exchanges, or issuers.

== Regulation ==
Regulation of ETPs depends on the product's legal structure and jurisdiction. In the United States, ETFs registered as investment companies are subject to the Investment Company Act of 1940. The SEC adopted Rule 6c-11 in 2019 to create a standardized regulatory framework allowing many ETFs organized as open-end funds to operate without obtaining individual exemptive orders, subject to conditions such as portfolio transparency and website disclosure.

Other U.S. ETPs, such as some commodity, currency, and crypto-asset products, may have offerings registered under the Securities Act of 1933 and may be listed and traded pursuant to exchange rules under the Securities Exchange Act of 1934, but may not be registered as investment companies under the Investment Company Act of 1940. In September 2025, the SEC approved generic listing standards for exchange-traded products that hold spot commodities, including digital assets. Qualifying commodity-based trust shares may list and trade under those standards without a separate proposed rule change under Section 19(b) of the Exchange Act.

In the European Union, funds marketed as UCITS ETFs are subject to the UCITS framework and ESMA guidelines on ETFs and other UCITS issues. Securities offered to the public or admitted to trading on a regulated market may also be subject to Regulation (EU) 2017/1129, the EU prospectus regulation, which replaced the earlier Prospectus Directive. In the United Kingdom, the Financial Conduct Authority describes ETPs as falling into three broad categories: ETFs, ETCs, and ETNs, and identifies leverage, inverse exposure, and daily resetting as features that can make an ETP complex.

== Risks ==
ETPs are subject to the risks of their underlying assets or benchmarks, including market risk. They may also involve liquidity risk, tracking risk, bid–ask spreads, and the possibility that the market price will trade at a premium or discount to the product's underlying value. ETNs add issuer credit risk because they are unsecured debt obligations and do not hold underlying assets. Commodity, currency, and crypto-asset ETPs may have different regulatory treatment, tax consequences, and investor protections from registered investment-company ETFs.

Leveraged and inverse ETPs can be particularly risky for investors who hold them longer than their stated target period. Because many reset daily, compounding can cause their longer-term returns to diverge from the benchmark's cumulative return or from the simple multiple or inverse of that return.

== See also ==
- Exchange-traded fund
- Exchange-traded note
- Gold exchange-traded product
- Silver exchange-traded product
- List of exchange-traded funds
