= Silver as an investment =

Investment in the precious metal silver

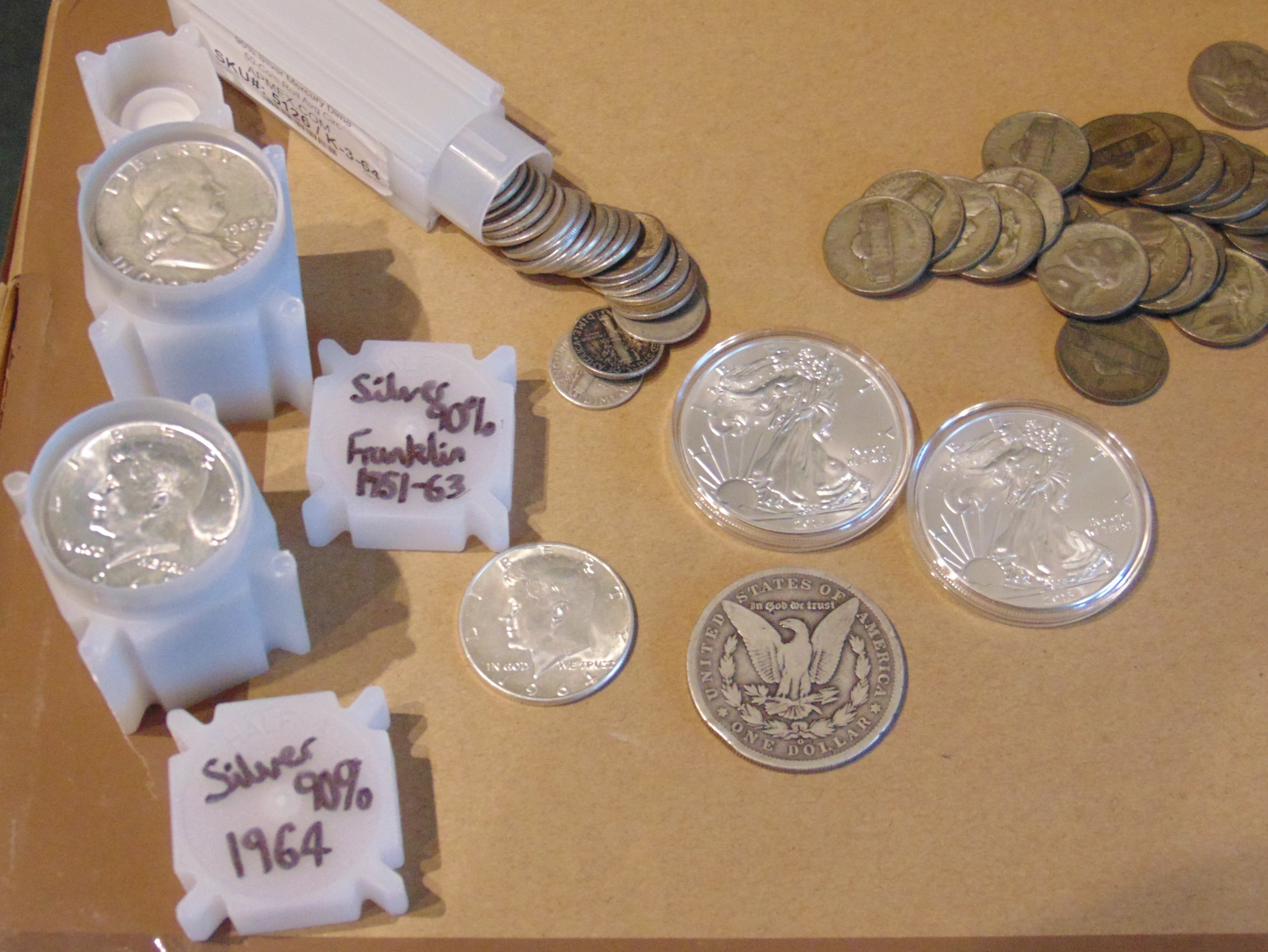
Various examples of American coins used as silver investments, including pre-1964 circulating silver coins and American Silver Eagle bullion coins

Silver may be held as an investment through physical bullion, bullion coins, exchange-traded products, futures and other derivatives, storage accounts, and shares of silver-mining companies. Silver has both industrial and investment demand, with uses including electrical and electronic products, photovoltaics, jewelry, silverware, coins, medals, and other industrial applications.

The price of silver is influenced by investment demand, industrial fabrication demand, mine supply, and recycling. In 2025, the U.S. Geological Survey estimated world silver mine production at 26,000 metric tons and world reserves at 610,000 metric tons. Silver is often recovered as a byproduct or coproduct from lead-zinc, copper, and gold mines.

== Supply and demand ==
Silver demand comes from both industrial fabrication and investment uses. In the United States, the U.S. Geological Survey estimated that domestic uses for silver in 2025 were electrical and electronics, 25%; other industrial uses and photography, 19%; net physical investment (bars), 18%; photovoltaics, 15%; coins and medals, 14%; jewelry and silverware, 6%; and brazing and solder, 3%.

World silver mine production was estimated by the U.S. Geological Survey at 26,000 metric tons in 2025, while world reserves were estimated at 610,000 metric tons. Although silver was the principal product at several mines, it was primarily obtained as a byproduct from lead-zinc, copper, and gold mines. The U.S. Geological Survey estimated that approximately 1,000 metric tons of silver was recovered from new and old scrap in the United States in 2025, accounting for about 11% of apparent consumption.

The Silver Institute, citing research by Metals Focus, reported that total silver demand fell by 2% in 2025 to 1.13 billion troy ounces. Industrial demand declined by 3% to 657.4 million troy ounces after four years of growth, while coin and net bar demand rose by 14%. The organization reported that global silver demand exceeded supply for a fifth consecutive year in 2025.

== Price ==
The price of silver from 1792 to 2005. The spike in 1980 reflects the events of Silver Thursday.

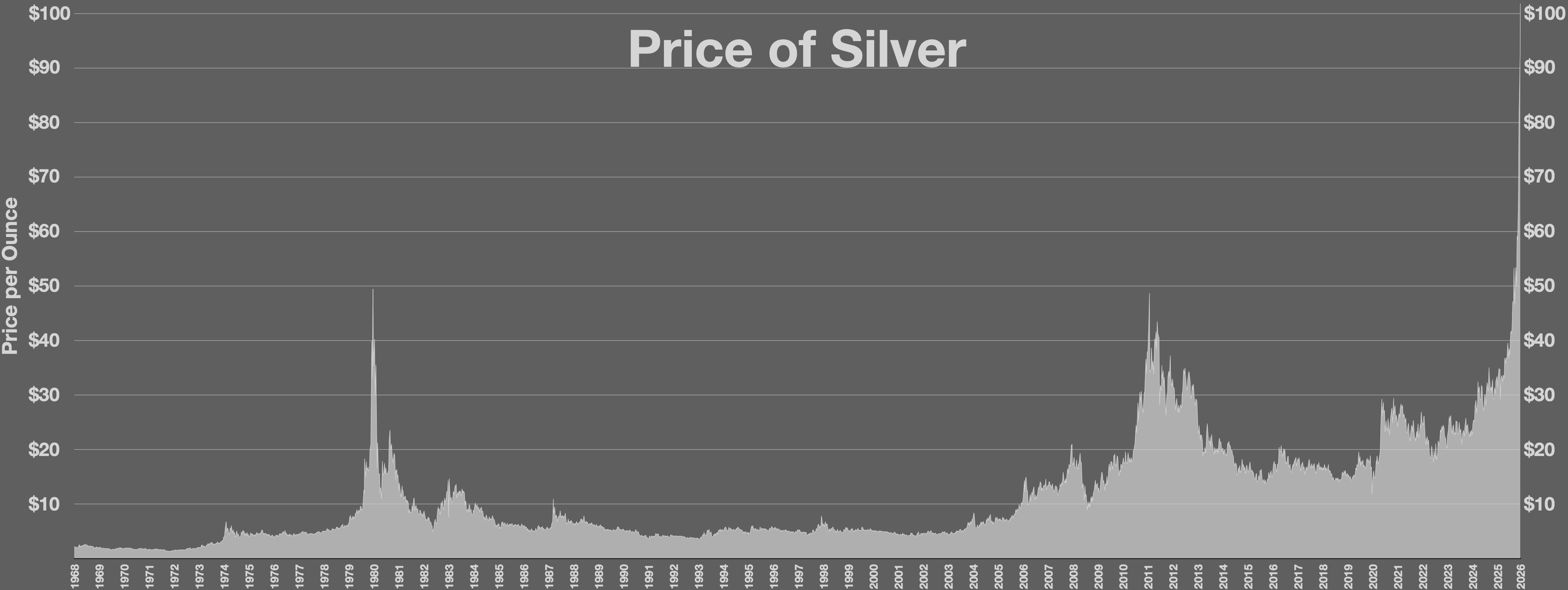
Price of silver 1968–2025 in US dollars

The price of silver is generally quoted in U.S. dollars per troy ounce. Like other commodity prices, it is affected by supply and demand, mine production, recycling, industrial fabrication, and investment demand. Silver has extensive industrial uses, including electrical and electronic products, photovoltaics, brazing and solder, photography, batteries, mirrors, water purification, and other applications.

Silver is often compared with gold because both metals have histories as monetary metals and stores of value. A 1981 study by Michael E. Solt and Paul J. Swanson reported a sample correlation coefficient of 0.83 between gold and silver price changes. The gold–silver ratio compares the market price of one troy ounce of gold with one troy ounce of silver. CME Group described the ratio as the number of troy ounces of silver required to buy one troy ounce of gold, and noted that the ratio can vary substantially even when the two prices are highly correlated.

In historical bimetallic monetary systems, governments sometimes fixed legal ratios between gold and silver. In the United States, the Coinage Act of 1792 set the proportional value of gold to silver in U.S. coins at 15 to 1 by weight.

=== Influences ===
Silver prices are affected by both investment and industrial factors. Compared with gold, silver is a smaller market and may be more volatile. During the 2025 rally, Reuters reported that factors cited by analysts included investment demand, supply deficits, demand prospects in artificial-intelligence data centers, solar cells, and electric vehicles, macroeconomic factors that also supported gold, and safe-haven flows as contributors to silver-price movements.

Silver has both industrial and investment uses. The U.S. Geological Survey identifies silver uses including electrical and electronic products, photovoltaics, coins and medals, jewelry and silverware, brazing and solder, photography, batteries, catalytic converters, mirrors, water purification, and other applications.

Mine supply is also affected by the fact that silver is often produced as a byproduct or coproduct rather than as the principal product of a mine. The U.S. Geological Survey reported that silver was primarily obtained as a byproduct from lead-zinc, copper, and gold mines, and that polymetallic ore deposits accounted for more than two-thirds of U.S. and world silver resources.

=== History ===
Silver price records are quoted using several market conventions, and nominal record prices may differ depending on the benchmark, market, and whether the figure refers to an intraday price or a closing price. The LBMA Silver Price is a benchmark for spot, unallocated silver delivered in London and is set through a silver auction administered by ICE Benchmark Administration. Silver futures traded on COMEX are separate exchange-traded contracts; CME Group states that the standard silver futures contract represents 5,000 troy ounces and is quoted in U.S. dollars and cents per troy ounce.

==== 1979–1980 ====
During 1979 and early 1980, members of the Hunt family accumulated large silver positions through physical bullion, futures, and related entities. A 1982 staff report by the U.S. Securities and Exchange Commission stated that Nelson Bunker Hunt, William Herbert Hunt, and International Metals Investment Co. Ltd. (IMIC) controlled about 123 million troy ounces of silver on 31 July 1979 and 195 million troy ounces at the start of 1980. As silver rose from about US$9 per troy ounce to about US$35 per troy ounce, the apparent value of the position increased from about US$1.1 billion to US$6.8 billion; when silver reached about US$50 per troy ounce on 17 January 1980, the apparent value was more than US$9.8 billion.

The market turned down after exchanges imposed restrictions on large silver positions. The SEC staff report stated that on 21 January 1980 COMEX imposed an emergency rule limiting silver futures trading to liquidation only, and that the Chicago Board of Trade followed the next day for several silver contracts. Spot silver fell to US$34 per troy ounce on COMEX on 22 January and, after a renewed decline in March, closed at US$10.80 per troy ounce on 27 March. The same report said that IMIC told Merrill Lynch on 13 March that it could not meet a US$44 million variation margin call within the customary 24 hours, and that by 28 March Bunker Hunt, Herbert Hunt, and IMIC had about US$1.75 billion in silver-related obligations, excluding margin calls.

The Commodity Futures Trading Commission later stated that it ended its silver investigation on 28 February 1985, alleging that Nelson Bunker Hunt, William Herbert Hunt, and other individuals and firms had manipulated and attempted to manipulate silver prices in 1979 and 1980. In 1988, a federal jury decided that Nelson Bunker Hunt, William Herbert Hunt, and Lamar Hunt must pay more than US$130 million in damages to Minpeco S.A.; Nelson Bunker Hunt and William Herbert Hunt subsequently filed for Chapter 11 bankruptcy protection.

==== 2010–2011 ====
Silver rose sharply during 2010 and early 2011 amid a broader precious-metals rally and increased speculative interest. Reuters reported on 28 April 2011 that spot silver reached a then-record high of US$49.51 per troy ounce, attributing the move to a decline in the U.S. dollar, gold's rally, and heavy speculative buying.

The rally was followed by a rapid correction. Reuters reported in May 2011 that some precious-metals traders viewed the April rally as unsupported by fundamentals, and noted that silver's smaller and less liquid market made it more volatile than gold. The Silver Institute reported that silver's 2011 annual average price was US$35.12 per troy ounce, more than double its 2009 average, and that world silver investment, including implied net investment, bars, coins and medals, reached 282.2 million troy ounces.

==== 2025–2026 ====
Silver prices rose sharply during 2025. Reuters reported in June 2025 that spot silver had moved above US$35 per troy ounce for the first time in more than 13 years, with analysts citing robust industrial demand and ongoing supply deficits. In December 2025, Reuters reported that spot silver reached US$66.87 per troy ounce on 17 December and later touched US$77.40 per troy ounce on 26 December. Reuters attributed the rally to factors including investment demand, supply deficits, silver's inclusion on the U.S. critical minerals list, expectations of U.S. interest-rate cuts, geopolitical tensions, and strong investment inflows.

The rally continued into early 2026 before a sharp correction. Reuters reported that spot silver reached US$121.60 per troy ounce on 29 January 2026 and then lost more than a quarter of its value the following day, attributing the reversal to technical selling and stop-loss triggers after a retail buying surge in bars and coins. In April 2026, Reuters reported that the Silver Institute and Metals Focus expected the silver market to record a sixth consecutive annual structural deficit in 2026.

== Investment vehicles ==
=== Bars ===
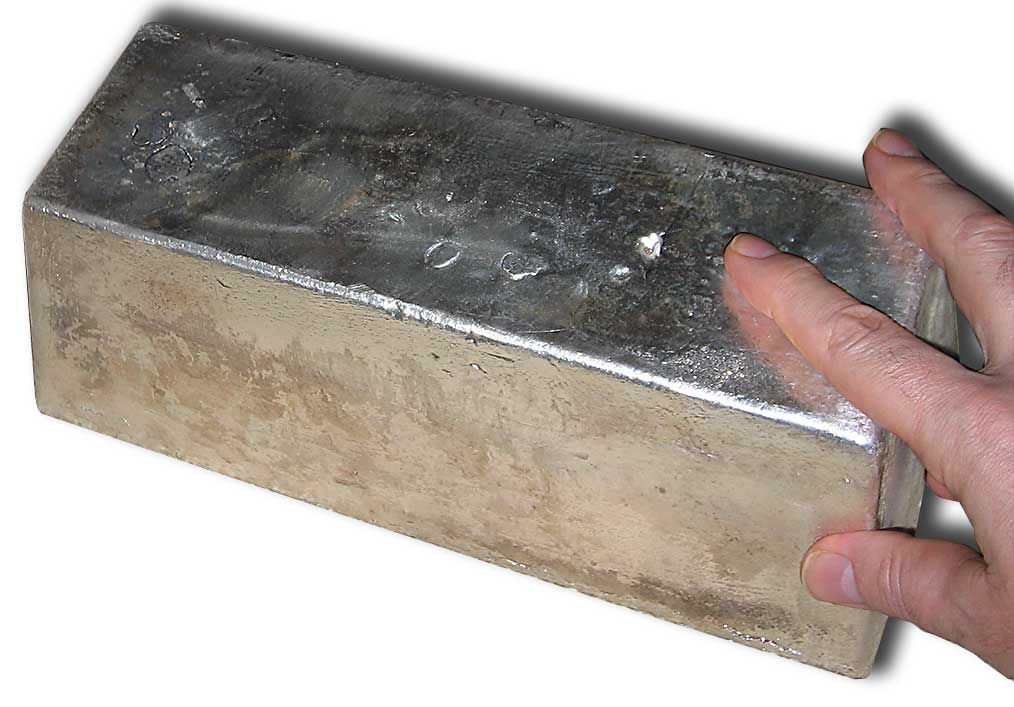
1,000 ozt (31.1 kg) silver bar

Physical silver can be held directly as bullion bars. In wholesale markets, bars are standardized. The London Bullion Market Association states that Good Delivery silver bars used in the Loco London market are approximately 1,000 troy ounces and must meet requirements for fine-ounce weight, purity and physical appearance.

Silver bars are also used for settlement of exchange-traded futures contracts. CME Group's COMEX silver futures rules specify delivery of 5,000 troy ounces of silver, with a 10% weight tolerance and a minimum fineness of 999. Eligible silver for delivery consists of five refined silver bars of about 1,000 troy ounces each.

=== Coins and rounds ===
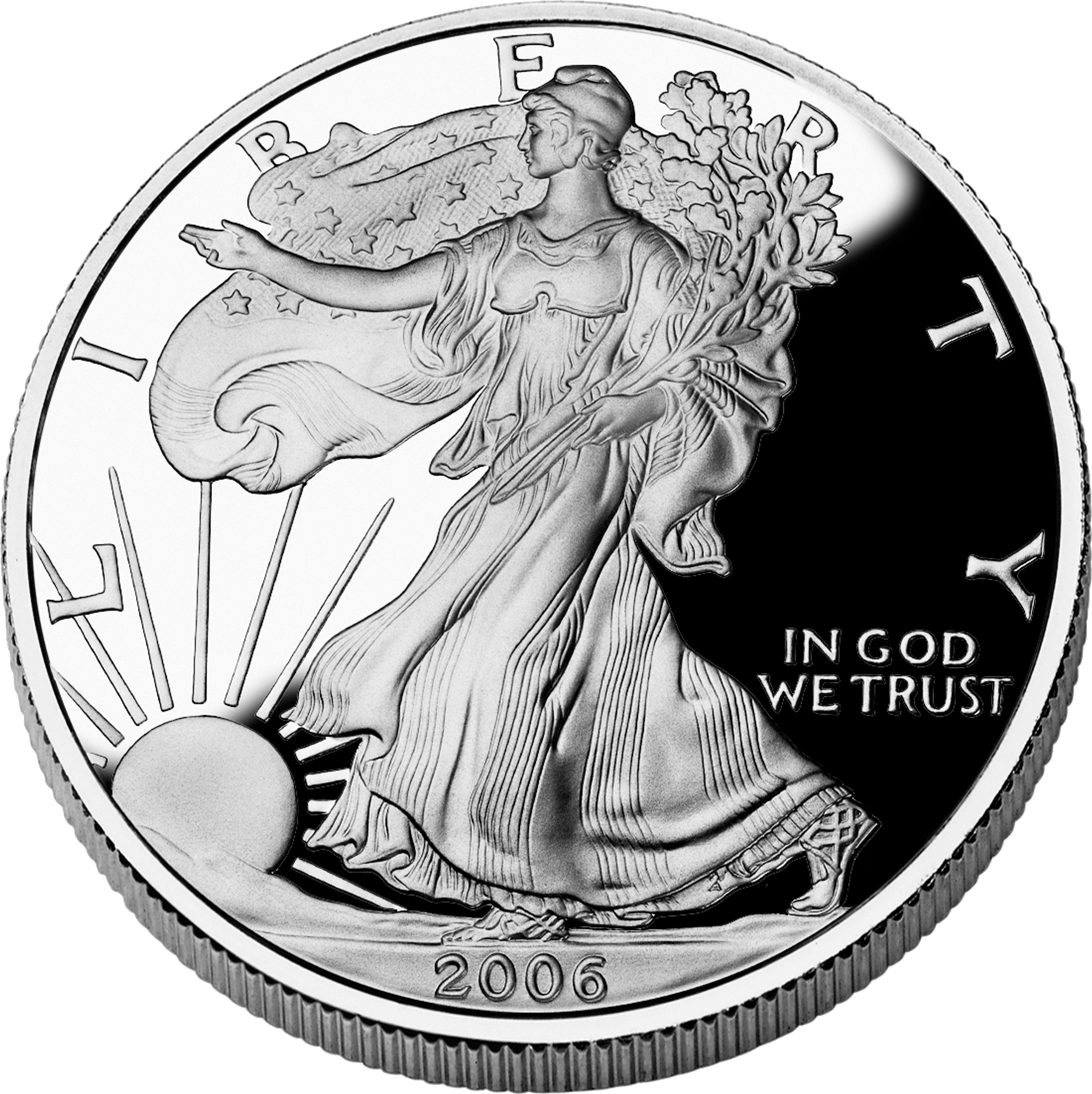
American Silver Eagle proof coin

Silver bullion coins are legal-tender coins issued by government mints. Their investment value usually depends on silver content and market premiums rather than face value. The United States Mint states that American Eagle Silver Bullion Coins contain one troy ounce of 99.9% silver and have a face value of one dollar; it also states that all American Eagle bullion coins are legal tender and that their face value is largely symbolic.

Other government mints issue comparable silver bullion coins. The Royal Canadian Mint states that the Canadian Silver Maple Leaf has been issued since 1988, is minted with one troy ounce of 99.99% fine silver, and has a face value of five Canadian dollars.

Older circulating silver coins may also be bought for their bullion value. In the United States, older 90% silver coins continued to circulate after the Coinage Act of 1965, while newly issued dimes and quarters were changed to non-silver clad compositions and newly issued Kennedy half dollars contained 40% silver.

Silver rounds are coin-shaped silver pieces that resemble coins but are not legal tender. The Silver Institute describes official coins as silver coins issued by a government mint, while medallions or rounds are round pieces of silver resembling coins but not considered legal tender.

=== Exchange-traded products ===
Silver exchange-traded products provide exchange-traded exposure to silver prices without requiring investors to store physical bullion directly. The structure of these products varies. In the United States, FINRA states that some ETPs investing in commodities, currencies, or commodity- or currency-based instruments such as futures are not registered under the Investment Company Act of 1940, and that ETP structure can affect costs, risks, tax consequences, and investor protections.

=== Accounts ===
Silver may also be held through certificates or storage accounts rather than by taking physical delivery of bars or coins. The Silver Institute describes certificates or storage accounts as arrangements in which silver is kept in storage and the investor can take possession within a few days if desired.

Bullion accounts may be held on an allocated or unallocated basis. The London Bullion Market Association states that, in an allocated account, the customer has title or ownership of specific bars held on the customer's behalf and identified in a weight list. In an unallocated account, the customer does not own specific bars but has a general entitlement to an amount of metal; the LBMA describes this as similar to a bank currency account.

=== Derivatives, CFDs and spread betting ===
Exchange-traded silver futures provide derivative exposure to silver prices. CME Group's COMEX silver futures rules state that the standard silver futures contract is for the future delivery of 5,000 troy ounces of silver, with a weight tolerance of 10% and a minimum fineness of 999. The Commodity Futures Trading Commission states that futures contracts convey the right to buy or sell an asset at a future time, do not convey ownership of the asset itself, and are time-limited.

Contracts for difference (CFDs) and financial spread bets are separate leveraged products offered in some jurisdictions. In the United Kingdom, the Financial Conduct Authority includes leveraged CFDs and leveraged spread bets in its rules on restricted speculative investments and requires retail risk warnings stating that CFDs are complex instruments with a high risk of losing money rapidly due to leverage.

=== Mining companies ===
Shares of silver-mining companies are equity investments rather than direct ownership of silver bullion. Investor.gov, a website of the U.S. Securities and Exchange Commission, defines a share of stock as an ownership position in a corporation and a proportional claim on the corporation's assets and profits.

The performance of silver-mining shares can differ from the performance of silver bullion because mining companies may have exposure to other metals and company-specific operating factors. The U.S. Geological Survey states that silver is primarily obtained as a byproduct from lead-zinc, copper, and gold mines, and that polymetallic ore deposits account for more than two-thirds of U.S. and world silver resources.

== Investment characteristics and risks ==
The risks and costs of silver investments vary by investment vehicle. Physical bars and coins provide direct exposure to silver prices, but can involve dealer premiums and spreads, storage, insurance, administrative fees, and the risk of loss or theft. FINRA states that precious-metals prices can fluctuate and are sometimes volatile, and advises investors in physical precious metals to obtain a full accounting of fees and other costs before investing. FINRA also states that dealers generally sell metal above the spot price and buy it back below the spot price, with the difference known as the dealer's spread.

Storage accounts, certificates, and exchange-traded products can introduce custody, counterparty, or product-structure considerations. The London Bullion Market Association states that allocated accounts give the customer title to specific bars identified in a weight list, while unallocated accounts give the customer a general entitlement to an amount of metal rather than ownership of specific bars. FINRA states that exchange-traded commodity products can differ in structure, costs, risks, tax consequences, and investor protections.

Derivatives and leveraged products may magnify gains and losses. FINRA states that commodity investments may offer leverage, which can amplify the risk of significant gains or losses, and that futures-linked exchange-traded products may perform differently from the spot price of the underlying commodity over time. The Commodity Futures Trading Commission states that futures contracts are time-limited and do not convey ownership of the underlying asset itself.

== Taxation ==
Tax treatment of silver investments varies by jurisdiction and by the form of investment. In the United States, the Internal Revenue Service treats long-term gains and losses from the sale or trade of collectibles, including metals such as gold, silver, and platinum bullion held for more than one year, as collectibles gain or loss. Net capital gains from selling collectibles are taxed at a maximum rate of 28%.

Value-added tax (VAT) treatment can differ between precious metals. In the United Kingdom, HM Revenue & Customs states that investment gold is exempt from VAT, subject to an option to tax. EUR-Lex similarly describes the European Union special scheme for investment gold as a VAT exemption for supplies of investment gold. The Royal Mint states that silver bullion coins and bars are subject to standard VAT in the United Kingdom, currently 20%.

== See also ==
- Diamonds as an investment
- Full-reserve banking
- Metallism
- Precious metals as an investment
  - Gold as an investment
  - Palladium as an investment
  - Platinum as an investment
