= Sovereign of England =

The sovereign of England may refer to:

- Sovereign (English coin)
- List of English monarchs
- List of British monarchs
- Monarchy of England
- Monarchy of the United Kingdom
