= Bombay Mint sovereign =

Historic coin minted in Bombay

Sovereign
- British India
- Value: £1
- Mass: 7.98805 g
- Diameter: 22.0 mm
- Thickness: 1.52 mm
- Edge: Milled
- Composition: .917 gold, .083 copper
- Gold: 0.2354 troy oz
- Years of minting: 1918
- Mint marks: I

Obverse
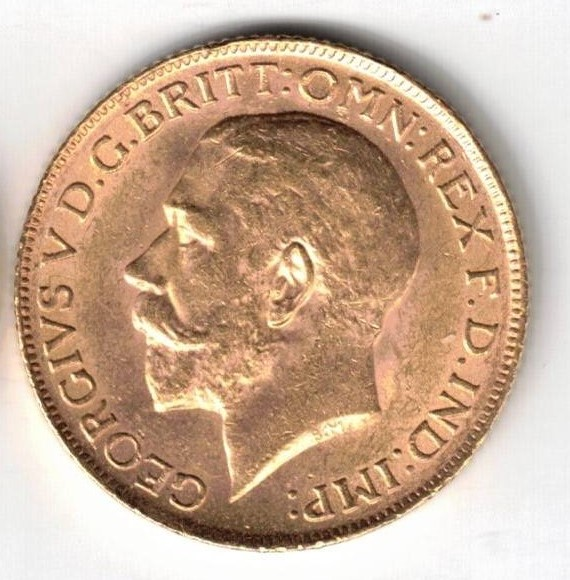
- Design: The British monarch (George V at the time)

Reverse
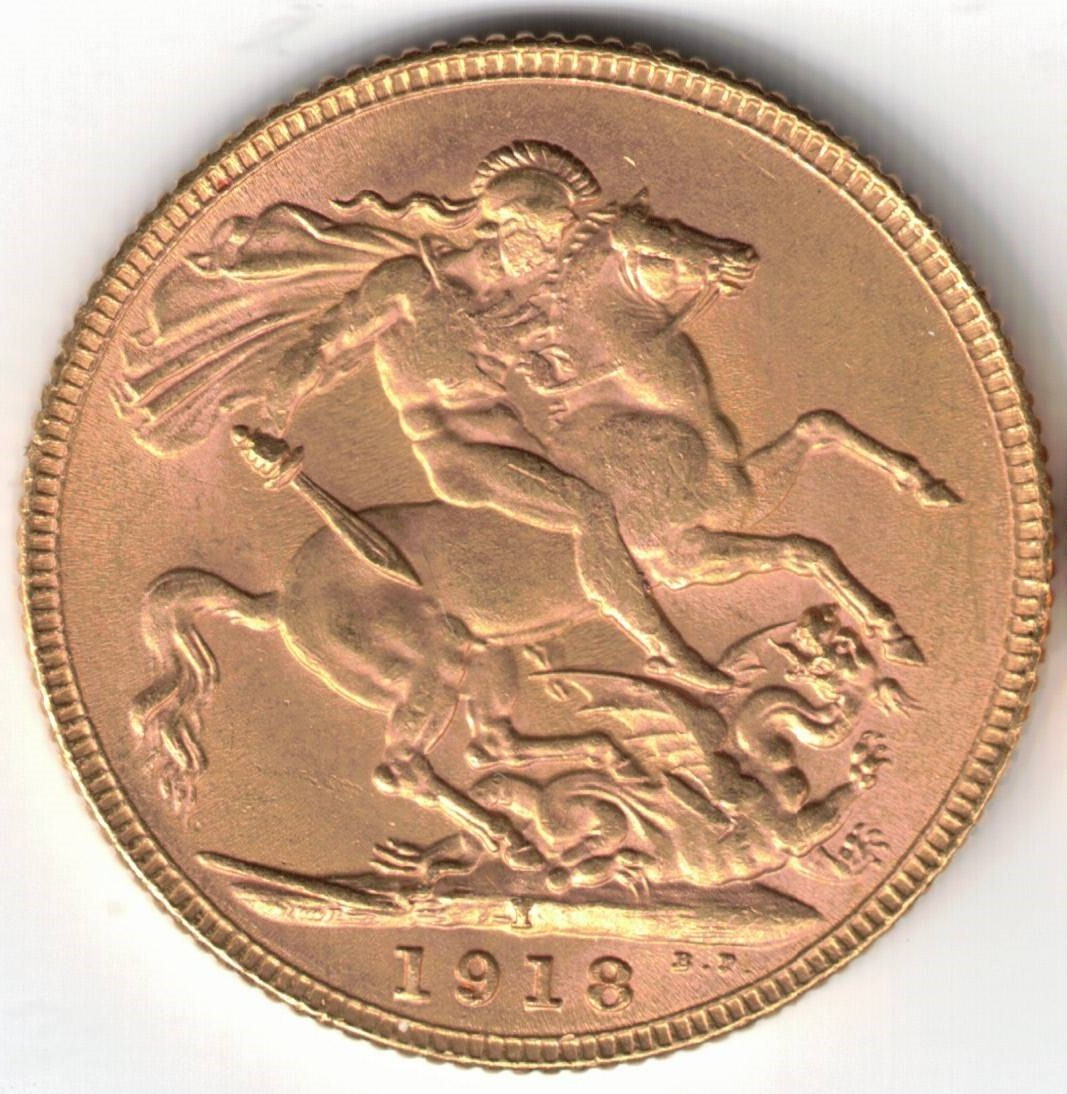
- Design: Saint George and the Dragon
- Designer: Benedetto Pistrucci
- Design date: 1918

The Bombay Mint sovereign is a British one pound coin (known as a sovereign) dated 1918, minted from August 1918 to April 1919 at the Royal Mint’s Bombay branch. It has an "I" mint mark, to distinguish it from other sovereigns.

Gold bound for London from South Africa was diverted to India due to naval blockades during the First World War. As a result, a branch mint was established in India and, for one year only, Sovereigns were struck in Bombay (now Mumbai).

== Background ==
India had its own distinctive gold coinage during the nineteenth and early twentieth century, however sovereigns and half-sovereigns were also used. Sovereigns minted in Sydney, Australia, were especially popular in India due to their yellow colour, as they contained silver alloy.

== Indian Branch Mint established ==
The possibility of establishing a branch mint in Bombay was initially considered at the turn of the century, however it wasn’t until 1917 that the Government of British India requested that sovereigns be minted locally. Construction of a new building for the purpose began in the early part of 1918, inside the grounds of an existing mint and concluded in May 1918. Dies arrived from London the following month, while automatic weighing machines and two coining presses arrived in early August. The fifth branch of the Royal Mint began issuing sovereigns on 15 August using gold shipped from South Africa (thereby avoiding war-time naval blockades).

Under the new Deputy Master, R. R. Kahan, 1,294,372 Sovereigns were struck at the branch mint in Bombay, distinguished from other Sovereigns by the inclusion of a small ‘I’ mint mark for India. The Bombay branch of the Royal Mint ceased operations with the minting of the last sovereign, on 22 April 1919.

The Indian 15 rupee gold piece, also minted only in 1918, was struck to the same specifications as sovereigns.

== Modern I mint mark sovereigns ==
As India prohibits the importation of gold coins, on 17 February 2013 a new partnership between the Royal Mint and MMTC-PAMP India was announced - a five-year license under which the MMTC-PAMP facility at Rojko-Meo Industrial Estate in District Mewat, Haryana would strike Sovereigns.
