= Crown gold =

Gold alloy

Crown gold is a 22 karat (kt) gold alloy used in the crown coin introduced in England in 1526 (by Henry VIII). In this alloy, the proportion of gold is 22 parts out of 24 (91.667% gold). Crown gold is appreciably less prone to wear than the softer 23 kt gold of earlier gold sovereigns — an important point for coins intended for everyday use in circulation. Later British gold coins including the guinea, first minted in 1663, and sovereign, 1817, were also in this alloy.

== Alloying metal ==
The alloying metal in England is traditionally restricted to copper. Copper is still used for the current British gold sovereign. An exception was the gold sovereign of 1887, when 1.25% silver, replacing the same weight of copper, was used to gain a better effigy of Queen Victoria for the Golden Jubilee of her reign. Elsewhere, both copper and silver have been used in varying proportions.

== Circulating coins ==
In the United States until 1834, gold circulating coins were minted in 22 kt crown gold using about 6% silver as well as copper. From 1834, the fineness of U.S. coin gold was decreased from the 22 kt crown gold standard to 0.8992 fine (21.58 kt); and in 1837 to 0.900 fine (21.60 kt exactly). This 90% gold–copper alloy continued in the U.S. from 1837 until gold coins were removed from circulation in the U.S. in 1933.

The South African Krugerrand, first produced in 1967, is produced in the traditional crown gold recipe of 22 kt gold, with the remainder copper, because it was originally intended to circulate as currency.

== Bullion coins ==
Most current gold coinage is intended as bullion and not designed for circulation, so the requirement for a hard alloy is much less. Gold bullion coins are commonly 24 kt, 0.999, 0.9999, or even 0.99999 fine in the case of the Canadian Gold Maple Leaf. Some bullion coins have stayed with the traditional crown gold standard, including the British sovereign, the Krugerrand, and American Gold Eagles.

== See also ==
- The Great Debasement
