= Ottawa Mint sovereign =

The Ottawa Mint sovereign is a British one pound coin (known as a sovereign) minted between 1908 and 1919 at the Ottawa Mint (known today as the Ottawa branch of the Royal Canadian Mint). This has augmented debate among numismatists because some view these pieces as Canadian while others view them as British and thus distinct from the decimal series of Canadian coinage. The discovery of gold in the Yukon in 1896 led to calls for the creation of a mint in Canada that could convert locally-mined metals into coins. Concerns that a low demand for Canadian coins could leave the mint idle lead to a proposal that British sovereigns (a widely accepted form of payment) could be produced domestically. To do so, Canada's mint would have to be established as a branch of the Royal Mint.

Sovereigns were used extensively for exporting funds, and redeeming bank notes, up to the twentieth century. Following the opening of the Ottawa Mint in 1908, the Dominion of Canada's government planned to produce decimal gold coins in addition to sovereigns. As it was a branch of the Royal Mint, it was obligated to mint sovereigns on request. Gold used to produce sovereigns came from British Columbia and the Yukon.

Despite not being a denomination of the Canadian dollar, in 1911 a place for sovereigns was included in cases meant to hold specimen coins, produced by the Ottawa mint.

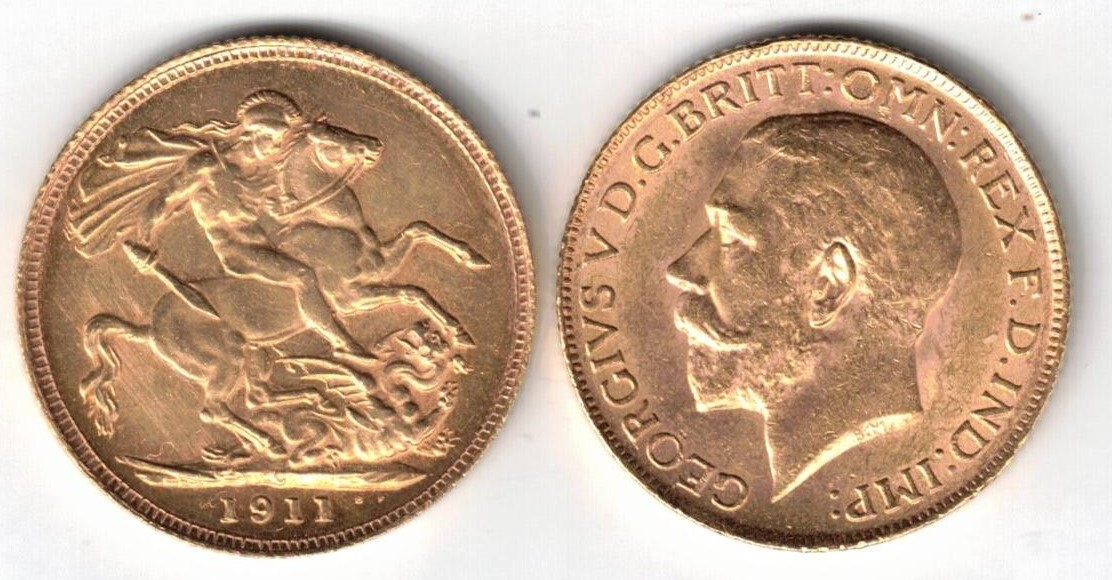
Sovereign with C mintmark

In 2019, the Royal Canadian Mint issued a gold coin resembling a sovereign to mark the 100th anniversary of the striking of the last sovereign in Canada. The coin had a nominal face value of ten dollars.

The sovereign's value was set at “four dollars and eighty-six cents and two-thirds of a cent” by the Currency Act of 1910, and made legal tender in Canada along with divisions of the sovereign. One Canadian dollar was therefore worth 15/73 of a sovereign.

== Edward VII ==
The various branch mints produced sovereigns for the Royal Mint. A mint mark distinguished the Ottawa Mint's production of the sovereigns. All sovereigns produced in Ottawa had a “C” mint mark to signify that it was produced in Canada. The sovereigns of 1908 were Specimen coins only and its tiny mintage was struck merely to establish the series. The production for the circulation of sovereigns began in 1909.

Date and mint mark	Mintage	Designer and Engraver (Obverse)	Designer and Engraver (Reverse)	Composition	Weight	Diameter	Edge
1908C	636	George W. DeSaulles	Benedetto Pistrucci	.917 gold, .083 copper	7.99 grams	22.05 mm	Reeded
1909C	16,273	George W. DeSaulles	Benedetto Pistrucci	.917 gold, .083 copper	7.99 grams	22.05 mm	Reeded
1910C	28,012	George W. DeSaulles	Benedetto Pistrucci	.917 gold, .083 copper	7.99 grams	22.05 mm	Reeded

== George V ==
The mintages for the sovereigns produced at the Ottawa Mint were modest. The total of all Ottawa Mint sovereigns barely equalled the yearly mintage compared to the London, England branch of the Royal Mint and the Australian branches of the Royal Mint. The Ottawa Mint's highest output for sovereigns was in 1911 when it produced 256,946. The rarest Ottawa Mint sovereign is the 1916. Only 50 pieces are known to exist today, and there is no evidence to explain why there is such a low amount in existence.

Until the last few years, the 1916 sovereign that was minted in London, England was rare as well, but thousands were released from a British bank. Another tale is that the 1916 Ottawa Mint sovereigns were lost at sea on its way to England during World War I. This is quickly dismissed because Canada could have deposited the gold with the New York Federal Reserve for the account of Great Britain.

Date	Mintage	Designer and Engraver (Obverse)	Designer and Engraver (Reverse)	Composition	Weight	Diameter	Edge
1911C	256,946	E.B. Mackennal	Benedetto Pistrucci	.917 gold, .083 copper	7.99 grams	22.05 mm	Reeded
1913C	3,715	E.B. Mackennal	Benedetto Pistrucci	.917 gold, .083 copper	7.99 grams	22.05 mm	Reeded
1914C	14,891	E.B. Mackennal	Benedetto Pistrucci	.917 gold, .083 copper	7.99 grams	22.05 mm	Reeded
1916C	6,111	E.B. Mackennal	Benedetto Pistrucci	.917 gold, .083 copper	7.99 grams	22.05 mm	Reeded
1917C	58,845	E.B. Mackennal	Benedetto Pistrucci	.917 gold, .083 copper	7.99 grams	22.05 mm	Reeded
1918C	106,516	E.B. Mackennal	Benedetto Pistrucci	.917 gold, .083 copper	7.99 grams	22.05 mm	Reeded
1919C	135,889	E.B. Mackennal	Benedetto Pistrucci	.917 gold, .083 copper	7.99 grams	22.05 mm	Reeded
