= The Great Debasement =

16th-century English currency policy

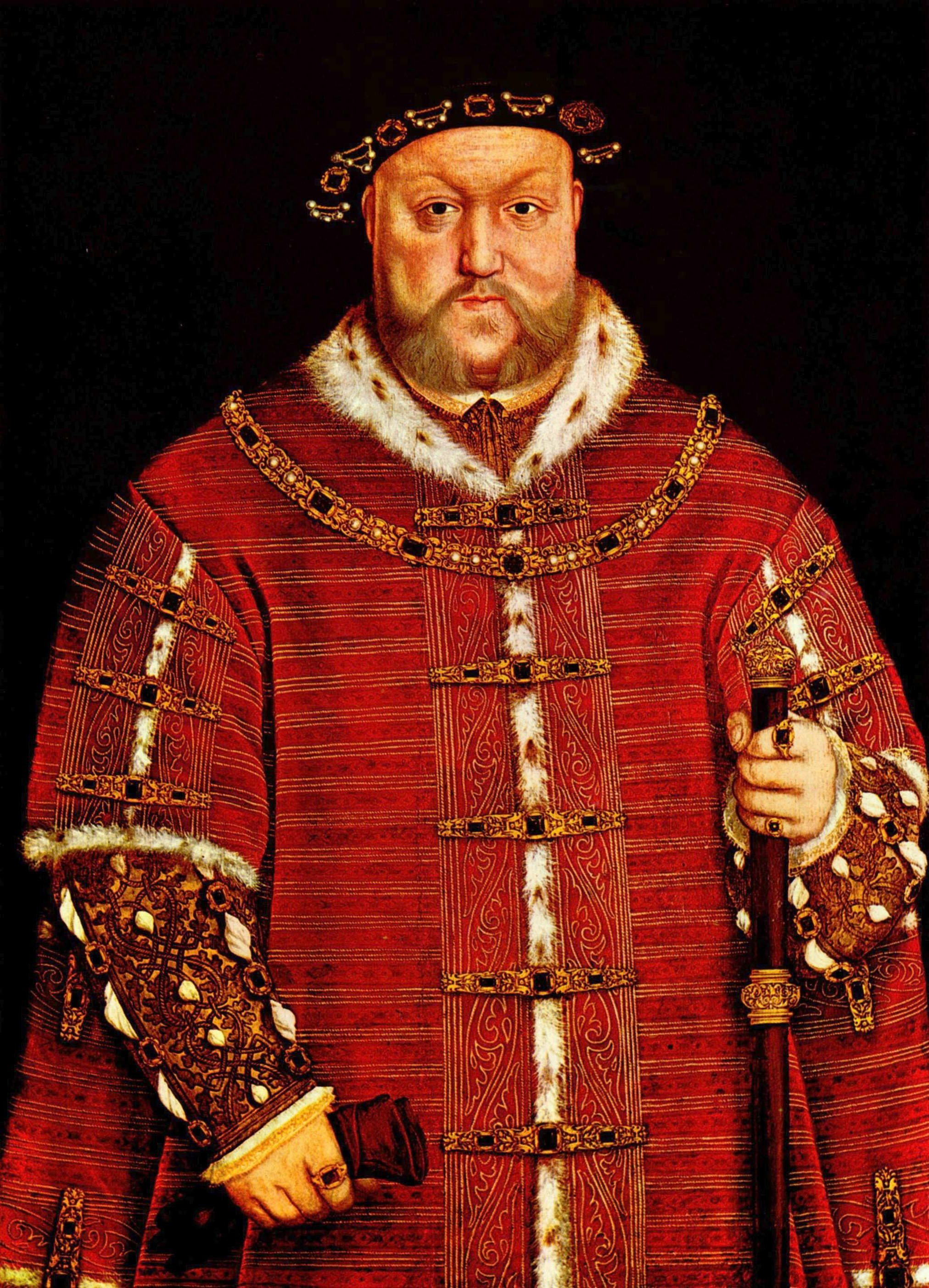
Henry VIII in 1542

The Great Debasement (1544–1551) was a currency debasement policy introduced in 1544 England under the order of Henry VIII which saw the amount of precious metal in gold and silver coins reduced and in some cases replaced entirely with cheaper base metals such as copper. Overspending by Henry VIII to pay for his lavish lifestyle and to fund foreign wars with France and Scotland are cited as reasons for the policy's introduction. The main aim of the policy was to increase revenue for the Crown at the cost of taxpayers through savings in currency production with less bullion being required to mint new coins. During debasement gold standards dropped from the previous standard of 23 karat to as low as 20 karat while silver was reduced from 92.5% sterling silver to just 25%. Revoked in 1551 by Edward VI, the policy's economic effects continued for many years until 1560 when all debased currency was removed from circulation.

== Background ==
In the 16th century, after suffering from the effects of the Black Death, Europe was in the middle of an economic expansion due in part to increased trade and newly discovered deposits of precious metals from the New World. However, England was suffering with financial difficulty. In the 1540s, Henry VIII began a campaign of excessive overspending of government money on his lavish lifestyle and to pay for wars with France and Scotland. In order to fund these, Henry had already raised great sums through the Dissolution of the Monasteries, selling off the Crown's land, and by raising taxes; however, more money was still required.

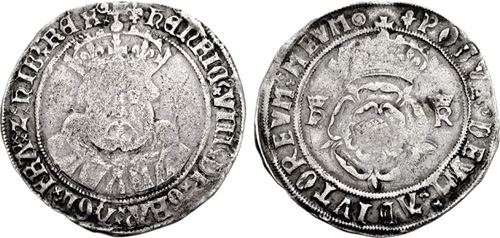
Debased testoon 1544–1547

In May 1542, Henry issued a secret indenture whereby he ordered that the amount of gold and silver within the country's coinage be secretly reduced and for the previously unsuccessful Testoon coin to be reproduced. For the next two years the newly minted debased coins, including the reintroduced Testoon, were stockpiled in Jewel Tower in the Palace of Westminster, while production of coins at the current standard continued. By May 1544, a lack of bullion arriving at the mint prompted the government to issue the secret indenture and allow the debased coins to enter into general circulation. Two months later, in July 1544, merchants of the Low Countries discovered that newly minted silver groats had become debased and begun offering a lower price for them. The introduction of these debased coins caused coins with higher precious metal content, yet similar face value, to disappear from circulation, in accordance with the principle that came to be known as Gresham's law, which suggests that 'bad money drives out good'.

== Further debasement under Henry VIII ==
Gold and silver standards continued to drop under Henry VIII: in 1545 gold was reduced to 22 karat and again to 20 karat in 1546. Silver content also dropped numerous times from the previously fine silver (92.5%) to 50% in 1545 and again to 33% in 1547. Copper was used as a substitute for silver in the coins. Henry's stockpiled testoons were covered in a thin layer of silver which had a tendency to wear off, particularly over the protruding nose of his portrait, revealing the copper underneath, so much so that Henry was nicknamed Old Coppernose.

== Debasement under Edward VI ==
After Henry VIII's death in 1547, nine-year-old Edward VI was crowned king. The debasement policy continued under the Lord Protectorship of Edward Seymour, Duke of Somerset; however, in 1548 an attempt was made to improve fineness by increasing gold fineness to 22 karat (a standard that became known as crown gold), at the cost of reducing coin size. Silver content, by contrast, reached a new low of just 25% in 1551. The debasement policy was officially revoked in October 1551, under Seymour's de facto successor, John Dudley, Duke of Northumberland. Silver fineness subsequently returned to the pre-debasement standard of 92.5% fine silver.

== Coins ==
Over the course of the seven years that the debasement occurred, gold and silver content in coins fluctuated, as well as the coins' weights. During debasement the following coins circulated.

- Sovereign
- Half sovereign
- Angel
- Half-angel
- Quarter-angel
- Crown
- Half crown
- Testoon
- Groat
- Half groat
- Penny
- Halfpenny
- Farthing

=== Penny ===
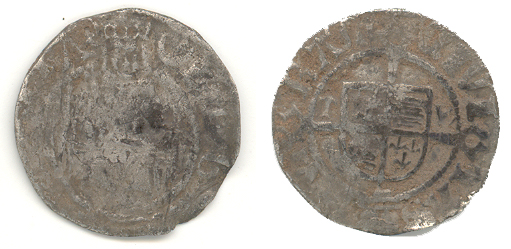
Henry VIII penny 1509-1547

During debasement the silver content of the penny dropped by more than 83%.

	1509–1526	1526–1544	1544–1547	Ref.
Weight	12 gr	10	10 gr	
Fineness	11 oz 2 dwt	11 oz 2 dwt	6-4 oz	

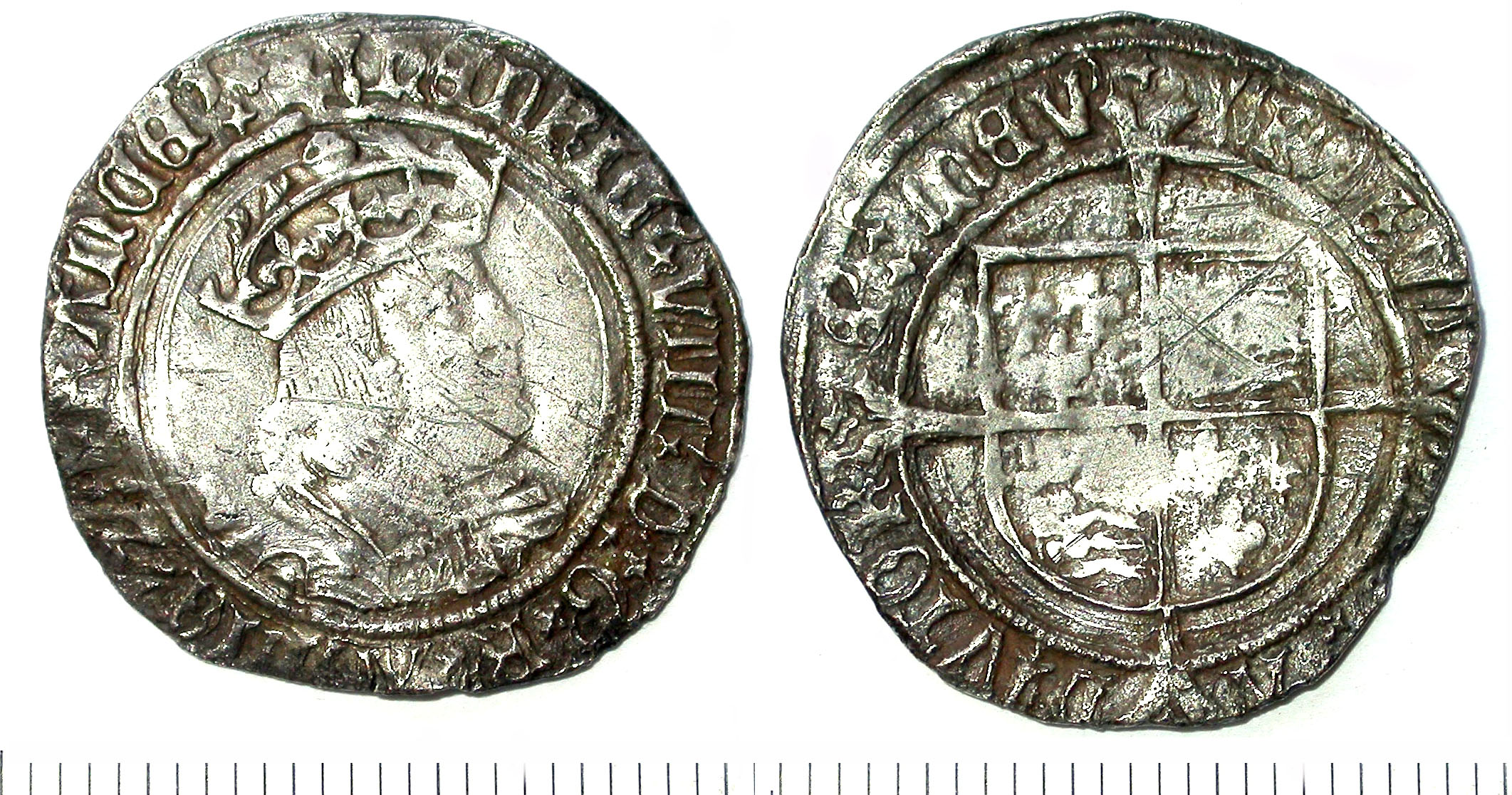
Henry VIII Groat 1526-1532

=== Groat (fourpence) ===
1544 the fineness of the silver was steadily debased from the normal .925 fine down to .333 fine.

	1509–1526	1526–1544	1544–1547	Ref.
Weight	48 gr	42 gr	40 gr	
Fineness	11 oz 2dwt	11 oz 2dwt	6-4 oz	

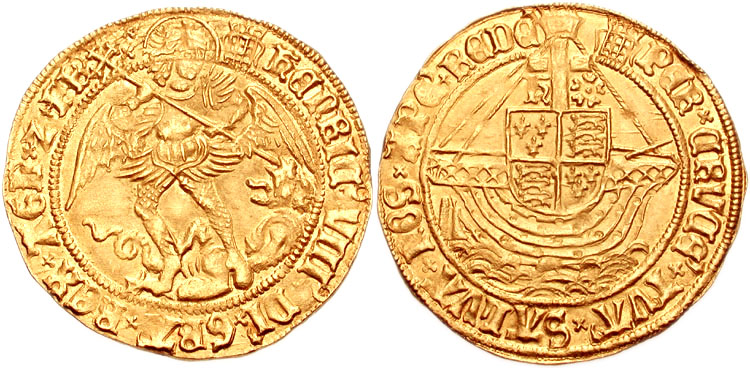
Henry VIII Angel 1508-1547

=== Angel ===
	1509–1526	1526–1544	1544–1547	Ref.
Weight	80 gr	80 gr	80 gr	
Fineness	23 ct	23 ct	23 ct	

=== Half Sovereign ===
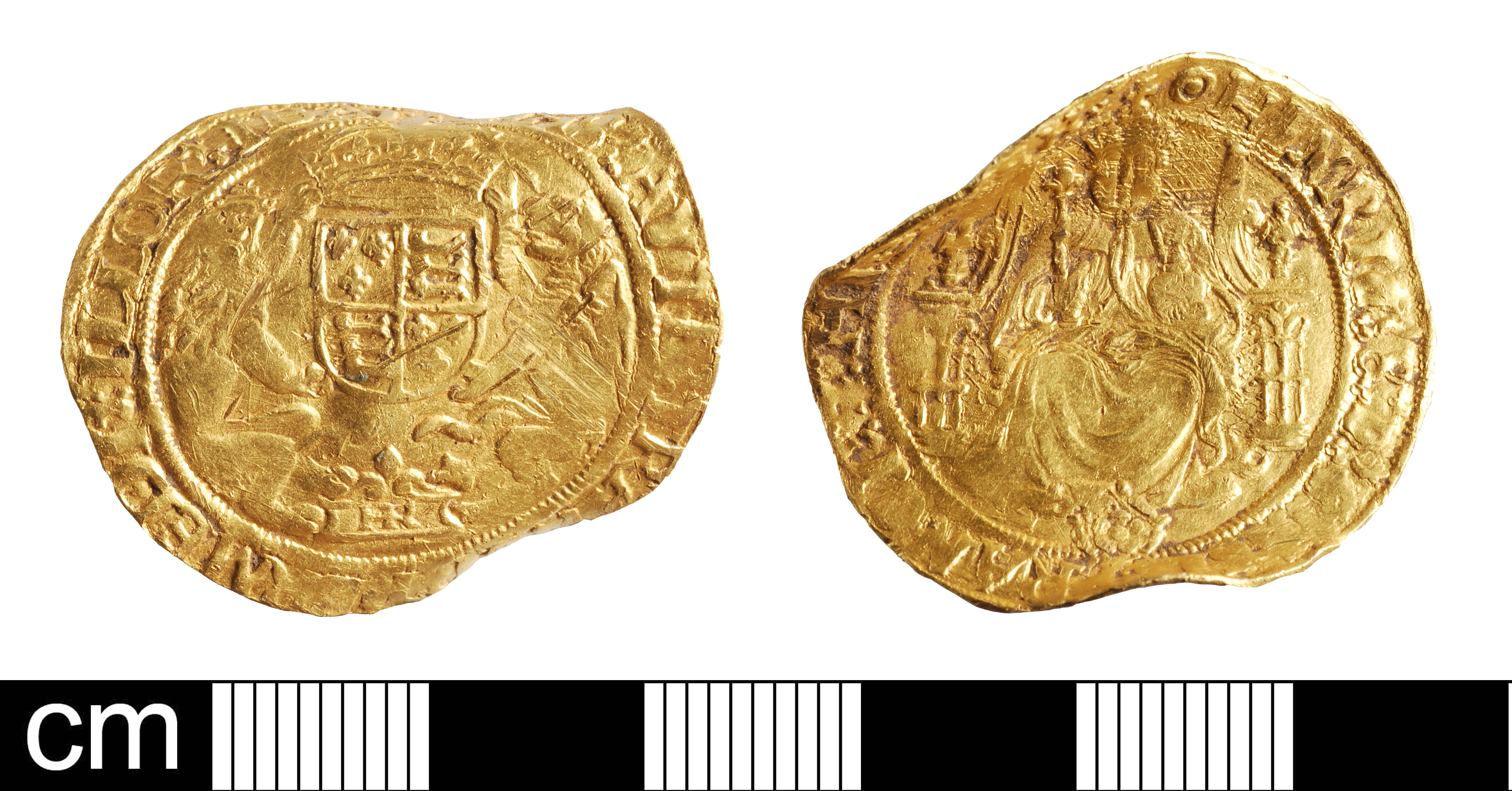
Henry VIII half sovereign 1544 - 1547

Half-sovereigns were produced in four different standards.

	Standard 1	Standard 2	Standard 3	Standard 4	Ref.
Issue date	1544–1545	1545–1546	1546–1551	1549–1550	
Weight	6.48 g	6.22 g	6.22 g	5.49 g	
Fineness	23 karat (.958)	22 karat (.916)	20 karat (.833)	22 karat (.916)	

=== Sovereign ===
Sovereigns like that half sovereigns were also produced in four different standards.

	Standard 1	Standard 2	Standard 3	Standard 4	Ref.
Issue date	1544–1545	1545–1546	1546–1547	1549–1550	
Weight	12.96 g	12.44 g	12.44 g	10.98 g	
Fineness	23 karat (.958)	22 karat (.916)	20 karat (.833)	22 karat (.916)	

=== Restoration under Elizabeth I (1558–1603) ===
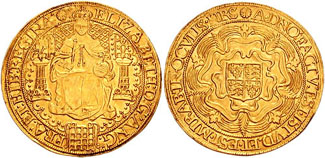
1585–1587 Elizabeth I milled Sovereign

By the time Elizabeth I came to power in 1558, the quality of England's coinage had already greatly affected both confidence in the monarchy as well as the country's trading relations, with foreign merchants refusing to accept the debased currency as payments. In concert with her advisers William Cecil and Thomas Gresham the queen became convinced that these problems could be solved by restoring England's coinage to its previously high standards, by removing debased currency from circulation. Coins with higher fineness were often hoarded, while debased legal tender currency was used to pay debts, a concept that in the 19th century would be referred to as Gresham's law, though it was not formulated as such by Gresham. In preparation for the removal of debased coinage, the government enacted a law which forbid "good" coinage from entering foreign markets and ended the legal tender status of all debased currency.

In 1560, under the instructions from the queen, Thomas Gresham withdrew all debased coinage from circulation and had the withdrawn coins melted down and replaced with newly minted coins with high fineness. An estimated £50,000 was gained by the crown in the process. In 1561 milled coinage was introduced into England by French moneyer Eloy Mestrelle replacing the often crude hammer struck coins.
