= Triple Unite (English coin) =

English gold coin produced between 1642 and 1644

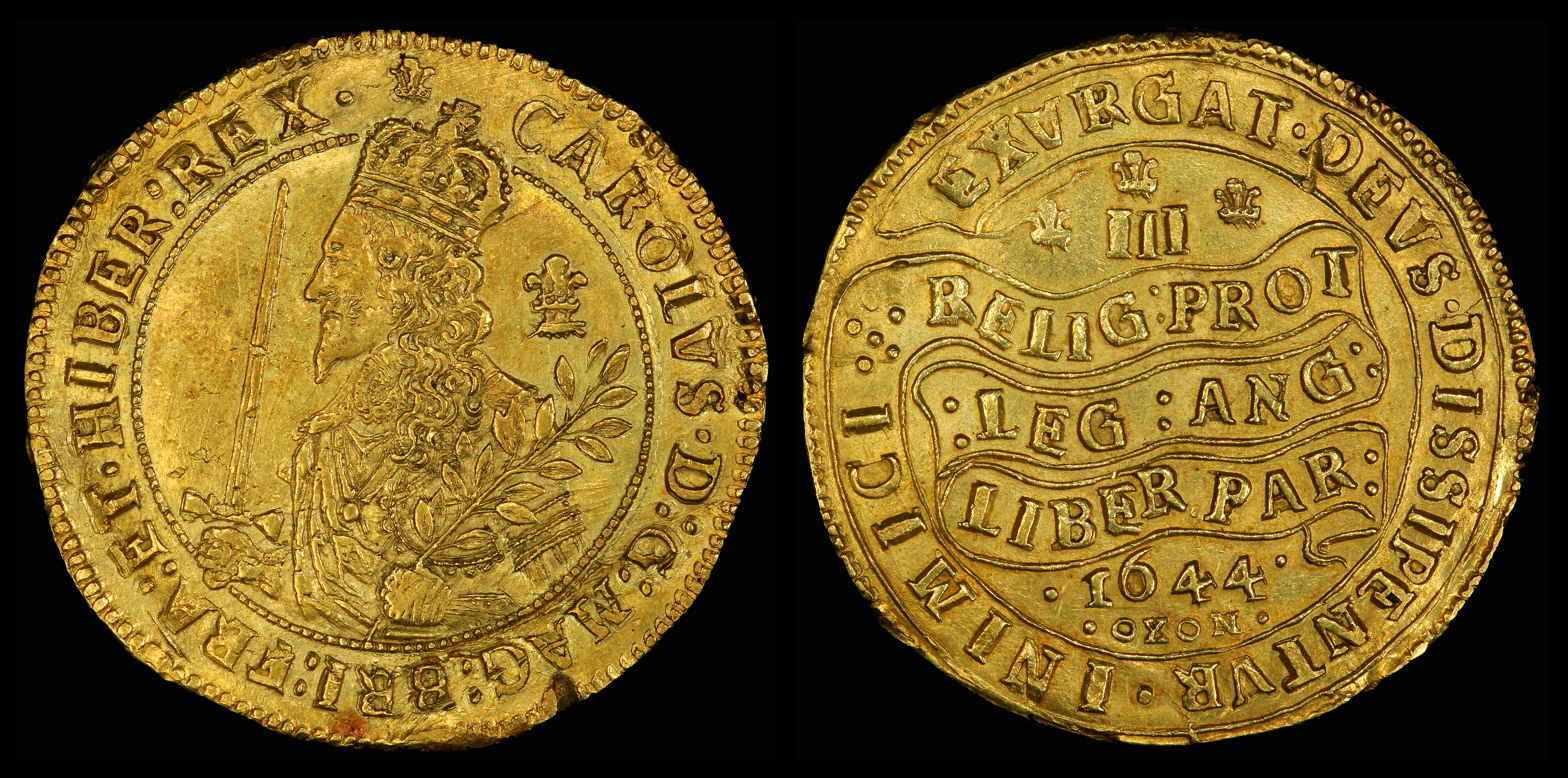
1644 Triple Unite (obverse)
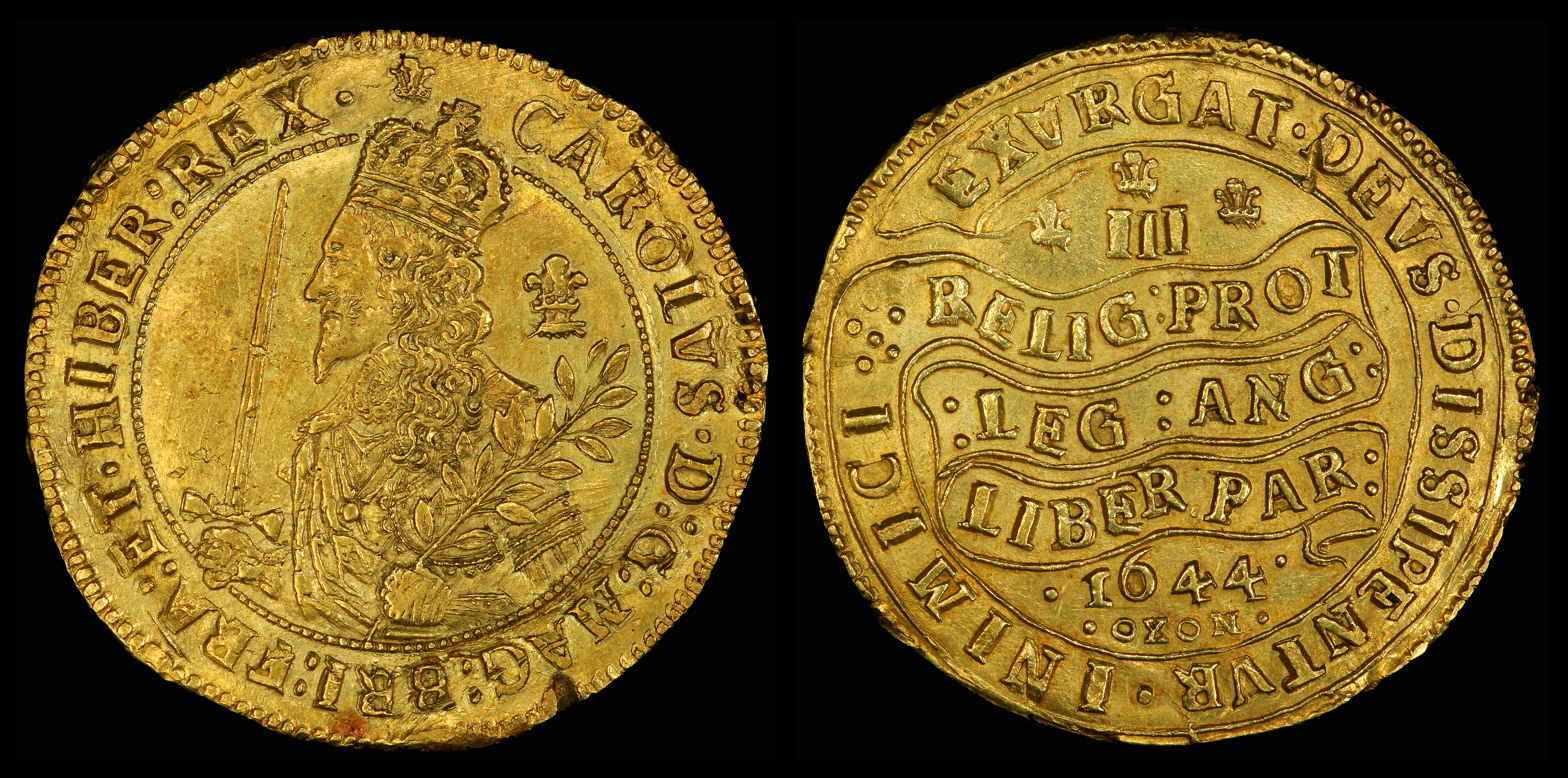
1644 Triple Unite (reverse)

The Triple Unite, valued at sixty shillings, or three pounds sterling, was the highest English denomination to be produced in the era of the hammered coinage. It was only produced during the English Civil War, at King Charles I's mints at Oxford (between 1642 and 1644) and, rarely, at Shrewsbury in 1642. It weighed 421 grains (27.3 grams, or just over 7/8 troy ounce).

The gold coins show the king holding a sword and an olive branch on the obverse, signifying his wish for peace rather than war.

The extremely rare Shrewsbury-produced coin shows, on the obverse, a plume behind the kings' head surrounded by the legend CAROLUS DG MAG BRIT FRAN ET HIBER REX – Charles by the grace of God, of Great Britain, France and Ireland King. The reverse shows the legend RELIG PROT LEG ANG LIBER PAR in three lines – The Protestant religion, the laws of England, the liberty of Parliament, with three plumes and the value numeral III above the declaration and the year 1642 below it, the whole being surrounded by the legend EXURGAT DEUS DISSIPENTUR INIMICI ("Let God arise and His enemies be scattered", from Psalm 68).

The Oxford issues are very similar to the Shrewsbury one, except that the legend on the reverse appears in three lines rather than two, and the obverse legend appears as CAROLVS D G MAG BRI FRA ET HIBER REX. Oxford coins appear with slight design differences in each year of 1642, 1643, and 1644.
