= Laurel (English coin) =

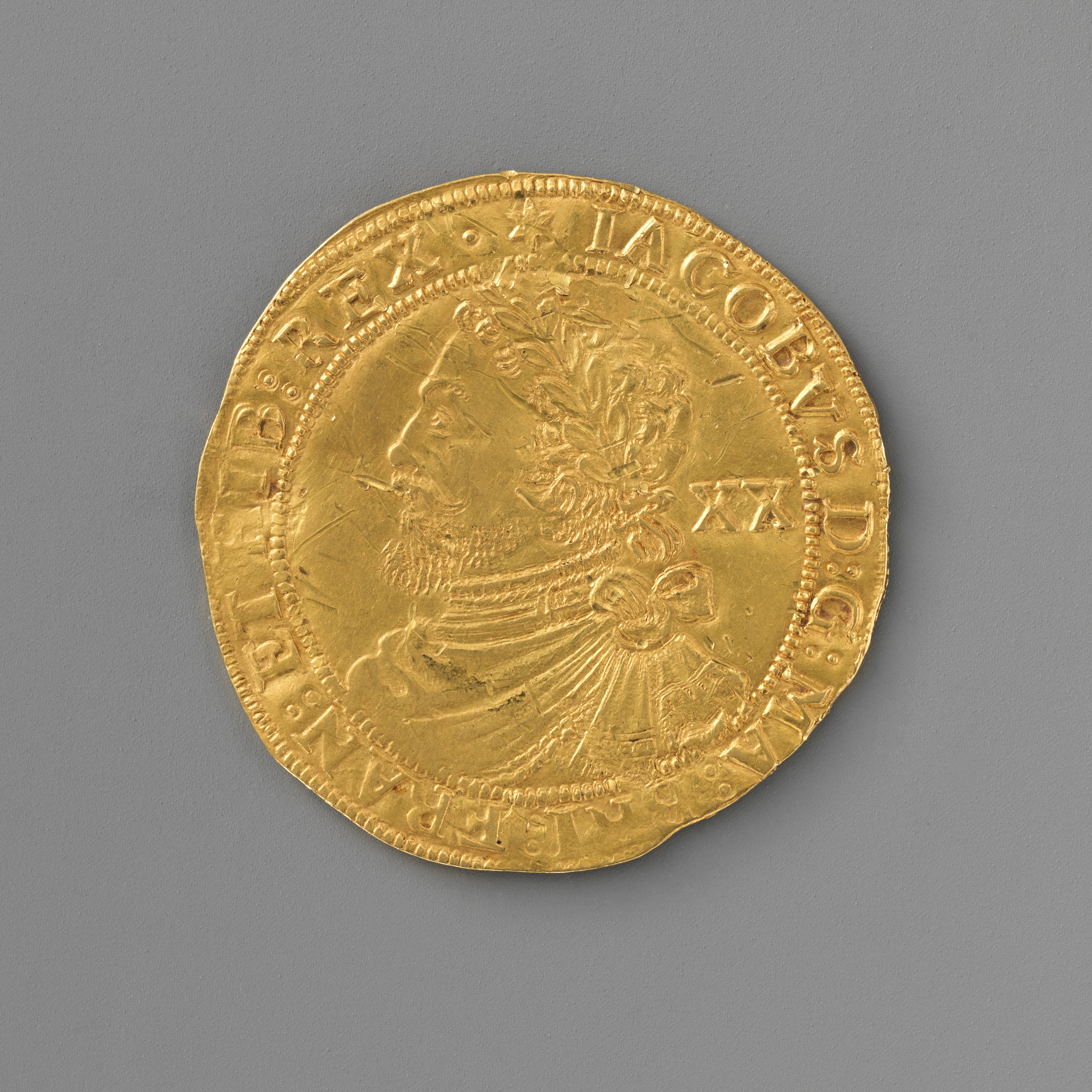
Laurel of James I

The Laurel was the third English gold coin with a value of twenty shillings (one pound sterling) produced during the reign of King James I. It was named after the laurel that the king is portrayed as wearing on his head, but it is considerably poorer in both quality and style than the sovereign and unite which preceded it. The coin was produced during James I's third coinage (1619-1625), five different busts of the king being used in these years. All the coins were produced at the Tower Mint in London. The laurel weighed 140.5 grains (9.10 g; 0.293 ozt), less than the previous unite but almost exactly the same as the Unite issued under Charles I.

The earlier busts show considerably more detail of the king, who is looking to the left of the coin and has the value XX (20 shillings) to the right, behind the kings' head. The legend on the obverse reads IACOBUS D G MAG BRI FRA ET HIB REX -- James by the grace of God, of Britain France and Ireland King. The reverse shows a long cross over a crowned shield which shows the arms of the four countries, and the legend FACIAM EOS IN GENTEM UNAM ("I will make them one nation", from Ezekiel 37:22)
