= Sovereign (British coin) =

British gold coin

- United Kingdom
- Value: £1.00 pound sterling
- Mass: 7.98805 g
- Diameter: 22.0 mm
- Thickness: 1.52 mm
- Edge: Milled (some not intended for circulation have plain edge)
- Composition: .917 gold, .083 copper or other metals
- Gold: 0.2354 troy oz
- Years of minting: 1817–present
- Mint marks: Various. Found on reverse on exergue between design and date for Saint George and the Dragon sovereigns, and under the wreath for shield back sovereigns, or below bust on obverse on earlier Australian issues.

Obverse
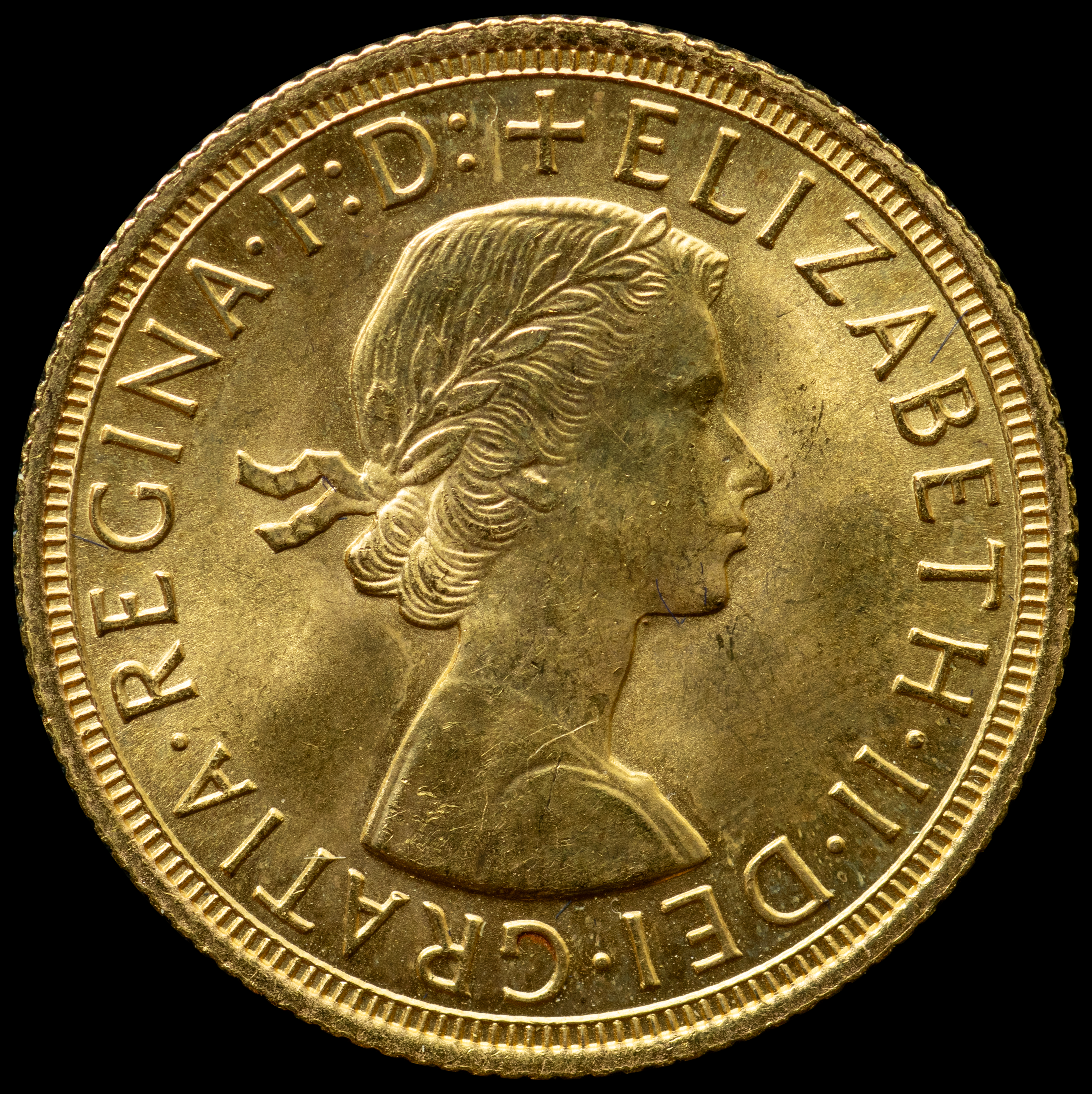
- Design: The British monarch currently depicted on the coinage (Elizabeth II depicted here)

Reverse
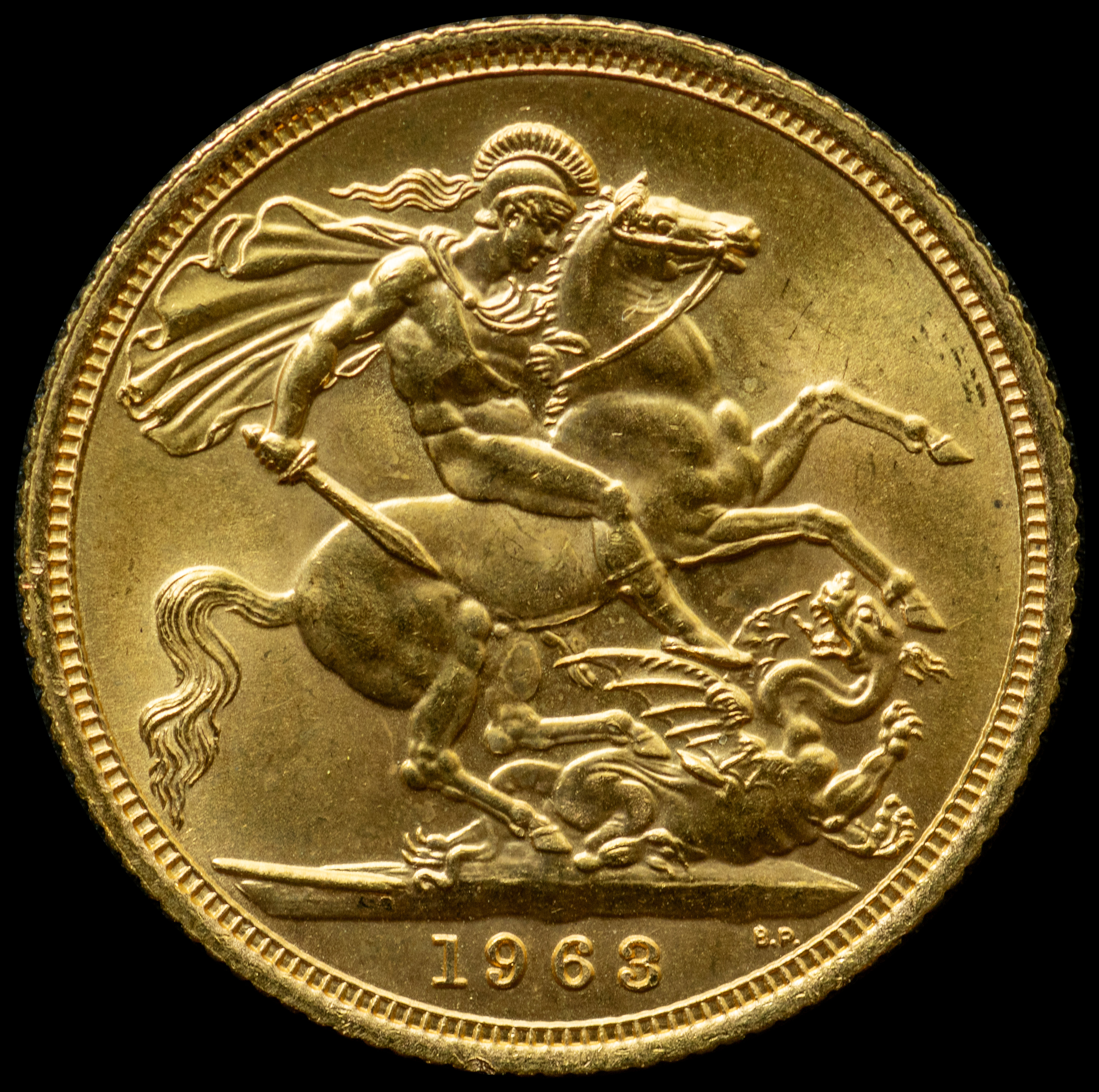
- Design: Saint George and the Dragon
- Designer: Benedetto Pistrucci
- Design date: 1817

The sovereign is a British sterling gold coin with a nominal value of one pound (£1), (Note: This is only the face value as a denomination of sterling; the gold within the coin is worth significantly more.) and contains 0.2354 troy ounces (113.0 gr; 7.32 g) of pure gold. Struck since 1817, it was originally a circulating coin that was accepted in Britain and elsewhere in the world; it is now a bullion coin and is sometimes mounted in jewellery. In addition, circulation strikes and proof examples are often collected for their numismatic value. In most recent years, it has borne the design of Saint George and the Dragon on the reverse; the initials (B P) of the designer, Benedetto Pistrucci, are visible to the right of the date.

The coin was named after the English gold sovereign, which was last minted about 1603, and originated as part of the Great Recoinage of 1816. Many in Parliament believed a one-pound coin should be issued rather than the 21-shilling guinea that was struck until that time. The Master of the Mint, William Wellesley Pole, had Pistrucci design the new coin; his depiction was also used for other gold coins. Originally, the coin was unpopular because the public preferred the convenience of banknotes, but paper currency with a value of £1 was soon limited by law. With that competition gone, the sovereign became a popular circulating coin, and was used in international trade and overseas, being trusted as a coin containing a known quantity of gold.

The British government promoted the use of the sovereign as an aid to international trade, and the Royal Mint took steps to see lightweight gold coins withdrawn from circulation. From the 1850s until 1932, sovereigns were also struck at colonial mints, initially in Australia and later in Canada, South Africa and India—they have again been struck in India for the local market since 2013, in addition to the production in Britain by the Royal Mint. The sovereigns issued in Australia initially carried a unique local design but by 1887, all new sovereigns bore Pistrucci's George and Dragon design. Strikings there were so large that by 1900, about forty per cent of the sovereigns in Britain had been minted in Australia.

With the start of the First World War in 1914, the sovereign vanished from circulation in Britain; it was replaced by paper money and did not return after the war, though issues at colonial mints continued until 1932. While it faded out of usage in Britain, the sovereign was still used in the Middle East and demand rose in the 1950s, to which the Royal Mint eventually responded by striking new sovereigns in 1957. Since then, it has been struck as a bullion coin and, beginning in 1979, as a collector's coin. Although the sovereign is no longer in circulation, it – along with the half sovereign, double sovereign and quintuple sovereign – is still legal tender in the United Kingdom, having survived the decimalisation of the pound in 1971.

== Background and authorisation ==
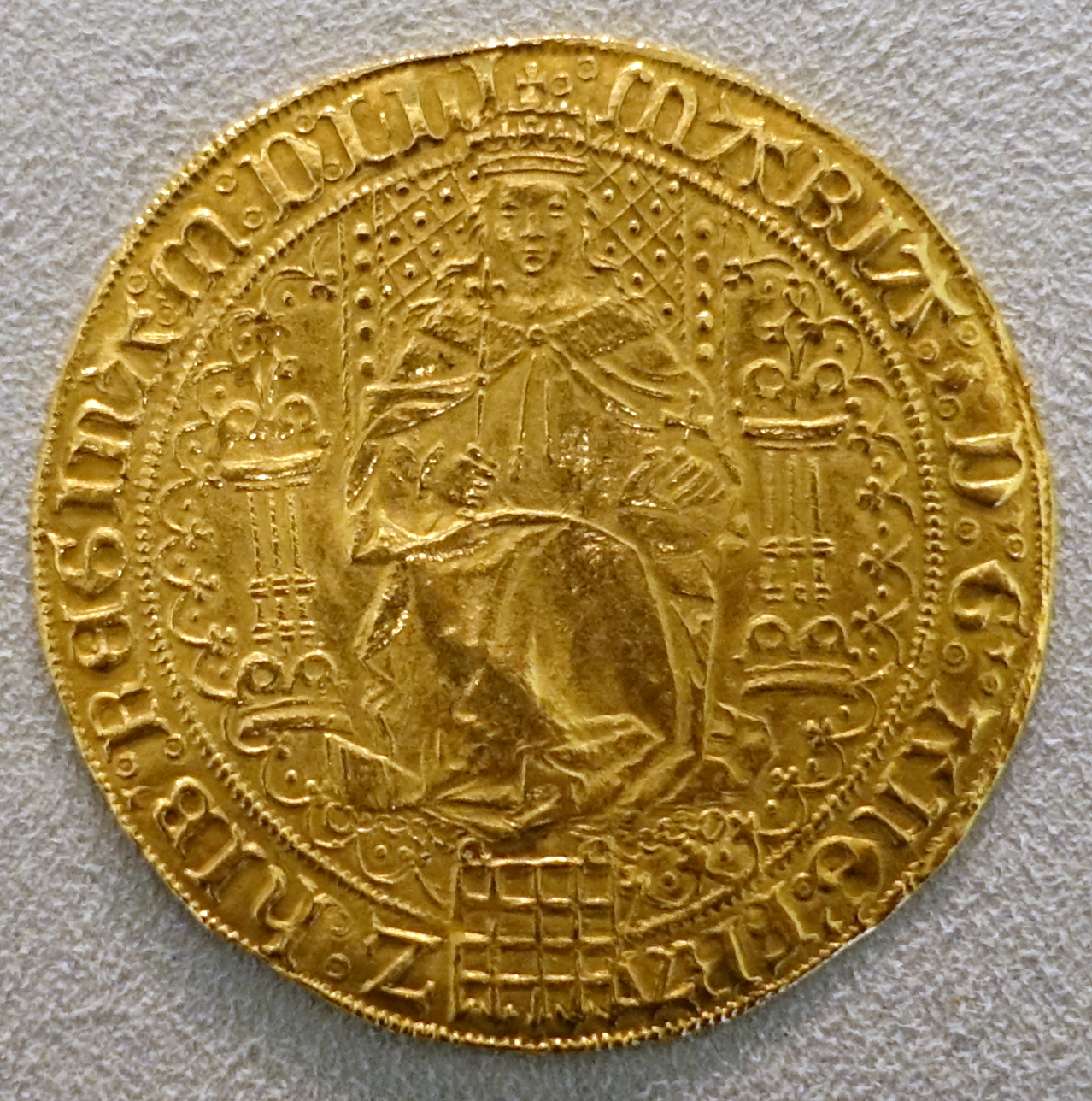
Sovereign of Queen Mary I, c. 1553

There had been an English coin known as the sovereign, first authorised by Henry VII in 1489. It had a diameter of 42 millimetres (1.7 in), and weighed 15.55 grams (0.500 troy ounces), twice the weight of the existing gold coin, the ryal. The new coin was struck in response to a large influx of gold into Europe from West Africa in the 1480s, and Henry at first called it the double ryal, but soon changed the name to sovereign. Too great in value to have any practical use in circulation, the original sovereign likely served as a presentation piece to be given to dignitaries.

The English sovereign, the country's first coin to be valued at one pound, was struck by the monarchs of the 16th century, the size and fineness often being altered. James I, when he came to the English throne in 1603, issued a sovereign in the year of his accession, but the following year, soon after he proclaimed himself King of Great Britain, France (Note: A historic claim only. See Hubbard.) and Ireland, he issued a proclamation for a new twenty-shilling piece. About ten per cent lighter than the final sovereigns, the new coin was called the unite, symbolising that James had merged the Scottish and English crowns.

In the 1660s, following the Restoration of Charles II and the mechanisation of the Royal Mint that quickly followed, a new twenty-shilling gold coin was issued. It had no special name at first but the public soon nicknamed it the guinea and this became the accepted term. Coins were at the time valued by their precious metal content, and the price of gold relative to silver rose soon after the guinea's issuance. Thus, it came to trade at 21 shillings or even sixpence more. Popular in commerce, the coin's value was set by the government at 21 shillings in silver in 1717, and was subject to revision downwards, though in practice this did not occur. The term sovereign, referring to a coin, fell from use—it does not appear in Samuel Johnson's dictionary, compiled in the 1750s.

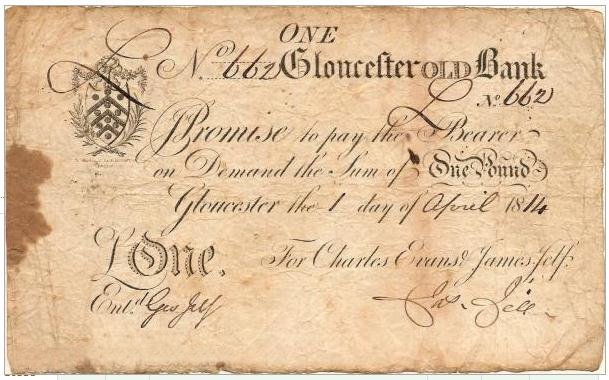
A £1 note issued in 1814 by the Gloucester Old Bank

The British economy was disrupted by the Napoleonic Wars, and gold was hoarded. Among the measures taken to allow trade to continue was the issue of one-pound banknotes. The public came to like them as more convenient than the odd-value guinea. After the war, Parliament, by the Coinage Act 1816, placed Britain officially on the gold standard, with the pound to be defined as a given quantity of gold. Almost every speaker supported having a coin valued at twenty shillings, rather than continuing to use the guinea. Nevertheless, the Coinage Act did not specify which coins the Mint should strike. A committee of the Privy Council recommended gold coins of ten shillings, twenty shillings, two pounds and five pounds be issued, and this was accepted by George, Prince Regent on 3 August 1816. The twenty-shilling piece was named a sovereign, with the resurrection of the old name possibly promoted by antiquarians with numismatic interests.

== Creation ==
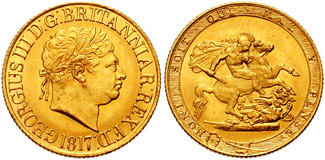
1817 sovereign of George III

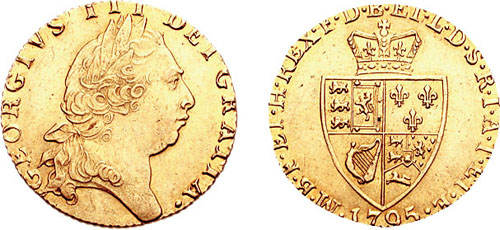
The sovereign replaced the guinea (pictured).

William Wellesley Pole, elder brother of the Duke of Wellington, was appointed Master of the Mint (at that time a junior government position) in 1812, with a mandate to reform the Royal Mint. Pole had favoured retaining the guinea, due to the number extant and the amount of labour required to replace them with sovereigns. Formal instruction to the Mint came with an indenture dated February 1817, directing the Royal Mint to strike gold sovereigns. As one troy pound (12 troy ounces) of 22-carat gold used to be minted into 44 1/2 guineas worth 44.5 × £1 1/20 = £46 29/40, each troy pound of 22 carat gold was henceforth minted into 46.725 sovereigns, with each coin weighing 7.98805 g (0.256822 ozt; 123.2745 gr) and containing 7.32238 g (0.235420 ozt; 113.0016 gr) fine gold. (Note: The indenture, dated 6 February 1817, directed that there be 934 1/2 sovereigns struck from twenty troy pounds of standard gold – or 46.725 sovereigns to a troy pound.)

The Italian sculptor Benedetto Pistrucci came to London early in 1816. His talent opened the doors of the capital's elite, among them Lady Spencer, who showed Pistrucci a model in wax of Saint George and the Dragon by Nathaniel Marchant and commissioned him to reproduce it in the Greek style as part of her husband's regalia as a Knight of the Garter. Pistrucci had already been thinking of such a work, and he produced the cameo. The model for the saint was an Italian waiter at Brunet's Hotel in Leicester Square, where he had stayed after coming to London.

In 1816, Pole hired Pistrucci to create models for the new coinage. After completing Lady Spencer's commission, by most accounts, Pistrucci suggested to Pole that an appropriate subject for the sovereign would be Saint George. He created a head, in jasper, of King George III, to be used as model for the sovereign and the smaller silver coins. He had prepared a model in wax of Saint George and the Dragon for use on the crown; this was adapted for the sovereign. The Royal Mint's engravers were not able to successfully reproduce Pistrucci's imagery in steel, and the sculptor undertook the engraving of the dies himself. Pistrucci's sovereign was unusual for a British coin of the 19th century in not having a heraldic design, but this was consistent with Pole's desire to make the sovereign look as different from the guinea as possible.

=== Pistrucci's George and Dragon design ===
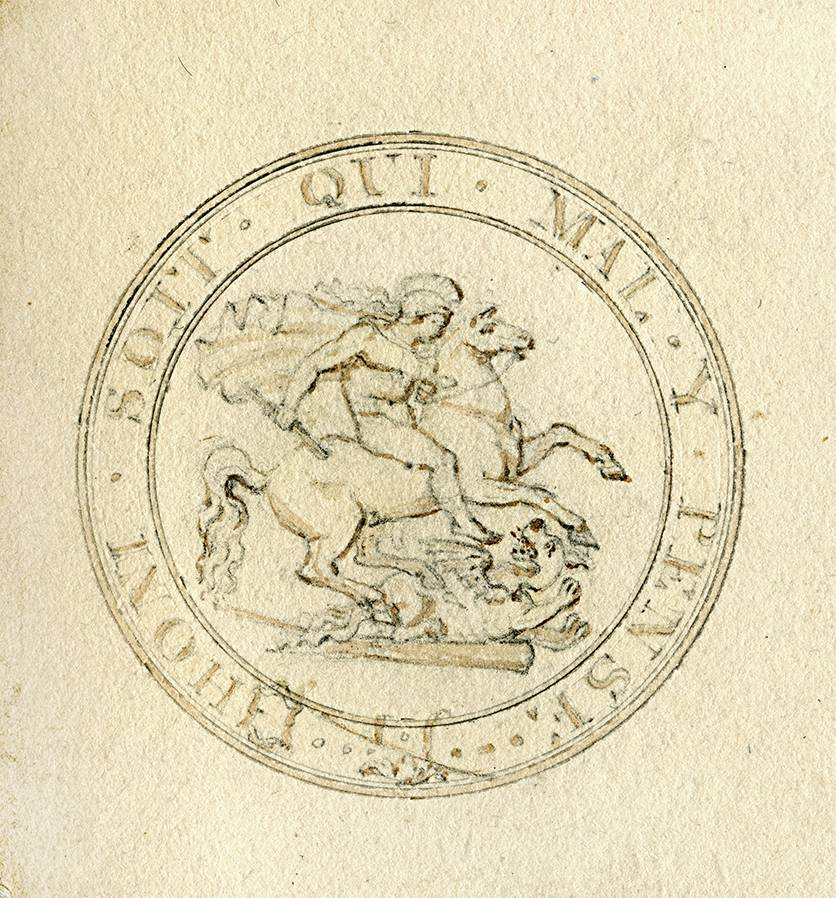
Pistrucci's original sketch for the sovereign

Pistrucci's design for the reverse of the sovereign features Saint George on horseback. His left hand clutches the rein of the horse's bridle, and he does not wear armour, other than on his lower legs and feet, with his toes bare. Further protection is provided by the helmet, with, on early issues, a streamer or plume of hair floating behind. Also flowing behind the knight is his chlamys, or cloak; it is fastened in front by a fibula. George's right shoulder bears a balteus for suspending the gladius, the sword that he grasps in his right hand. He is otherwise naked—the art critic John Ruskin later considered it odd that the saint should be unclothed going into such a violent encounter. The saint's horse appears to be half attacking, half shrinking from the dragon, which lies wounded by George's spear and in the throes of death.

The original 1817 design had the saintly knight still carrying part of his broken spear. This was changed to a sword when the garter that originally surrounded the design was eliminated in 1821, and George is intended to have broken his spear earlier in the encounter with the dragon. Also removed in 1821 was the plume of hair, or streamer, behind George's helmet; it was restored in 1887, modified in 1893 and 1902, and eliminated in 2009.

The George and Dragon design is in the Neoclassical style. When Pistrucci created the coin, Neoclassicism was all the rage in London, and he may have been inspired by the Elgin Marbles, which were exhibited from 1807, and which he probably saw soon after his arrival in London.

== Circulation years (1817–1914) ==
=== Early years (1817–1837) ===
"Whereas We have thought fit to order that certain Pieces of Gold Money should be coined, which should be called 'Sovereigns or Twenty Shilling Pieces', each of which should be of the Value of Twenty Shillings, and that each Piece should be of the Weight of Five Pennyweights Three Grains 2,740/10,000 Troy Weight of Standard Gold ... And We have further thought fit to order that every such Piece of Gold Money, so ordered to be coined as aforesaid, shall have for the Obverse Impression the Head of His Majesty, with the Inscription 'Georgius III. D.G: Britanniar. Rex. F. D.' and the Date of the Year; and for the Reverse the Image of St. George armed sitting on Horseback encountering the Dragon with a Spear, the said Device being placed within the ennobled Garter, bearing the Motto 'Honi soit qui mal y pense', with a newly invented Graining on the Edge of the Piece."

— Proclamation of George, Prince Regent
1 July 1817

When the sovereign entered circulation in late 1817, it was not initially popular, as the public preferred the convenience of the banknotes the sovereign had been intended to replace. Lack of demand meant that mintages dropped from 2,347,230 in 1818 to 3,574 the following year. Another reason why few sovereigns were struck in 1819 was a proposal, eventually rejected, by economist David Ricardo to eliminate gold as a coinage metal, though making it available on demand from the Bank of England. Once this plan was abandoned in 1820, the Bank encouraged the circulation of gold sovereigns, but acceptance among the British public was slow. As difficulties over the exchange of wartime banknotes were overcome, the sovereign became more popular, and with low-value banknotes becoming scarcer, in 1826 Parliament prohibited the issuance of notes with a value of less than five pounds in England and Wales.

The early sovereigns were heavily exported; in 1819, Robert Peel estimated that of approximately £5,000,000 in gold struck in France since the previous year, three-quarters of the gold used had come from the new British coinage, melted down. Many more sovereigns were exported to France in the 1820s as the metal alloyed with the gold included silver, which could be profitably recovered, with the gold often returned to Britain and struck again into sovereigns. Beginning in 1829, the Mint was able to eliminate the silver, but the drain on sovereigns from before then continued.

George III died in January 1820, succeeded by George, Prince Regent, as George IV. Mint officials decided to continue to use the late king's head on coinage for the remainder of the year. For King George IV's coinage, Pistrucci modified the George and Dragon reverse, eliminating the surrounding Garter ribbon and motto, with a reeded border substituted. Pistrucci also modified the figure of the saint, placing a sword in his hand in place of the broken lance seen previously, eliminating the streamer from his helmet, and refining the look of the cloak.

The obverse design for George IV's sovereigns featured a "Laureate head" of George IV, based on the bust Pistrucci had prepared for the Coronation medal. The new version was authorised by an Order in Council of 5 May 1821. These were struck every year between 1821 and 1825, but the king was unhappy with the depiction of him and requested a new one be prepared, based on a more flattering bust by Francis Chantrey. Pistrucci refused to copy the work of another artist and was barred from further work on the coinage. Second Engraver (later Chief Engraver) William Wyon was assigned to translate Chantrey's bust into a coin design, and the new sovereign came into use during 1825. It did not bear the George and Dragon design, as the new Master of the Mint, Thomas Wallace, disliked several of the current coinage designs, and had Jean Baptiste Merlen of the Royal Mint prepare new reverse designs. The new reverse for the sovereign featured the Ensigns Armorial, or royal arms of the United Kingdom, crowned, with the lions of England seen in two of the quarters, balanced by those of Scotland and the harp of Ireland. Set on the shield are the arms of Hanover, (Note: The British monarch also ruled Hanover between 1714 and 1837. See Seaby, pp. 134, 153.) again crowned, depicting the armorial bearings of Brunswick, Lüneburg and Celle. The George and Dragon design would not again appear on the sovereign until 1871.

William IV's accession in 1830 upon the death of his brother George IV led to new designs for the sovereign, with the new king's depiction engraved by William Wyon based on a bust by Chantrey. Two slightly different busts were used, with what is usually called the "first bust" used for most 1831 circulating pieces (the first year of production) and some from 1832, with the "second bust" used for the prototype pattern coins that year, as well as for proof coins of 1831, some from 1832 and taking over entirely by 1833. The reverse shows another depiction by Merlen of the Ensigns Armorial, with the date accompanied by the Latin word Anno, or "in the year". These were struck every year until the year of the king's death, 1837.

=== Victorian era ===
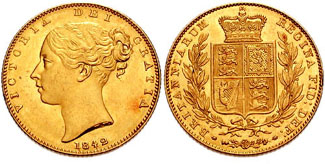
1842 "Shield reverse" sovereign

The accession of Queen Victoria in 1837 ended the personal union between Britain and Hanover, as under the latter's Salic Law, a woman could not take the Hanoverian throne. Thus, both sides of the sovereign had to be changed. Wyon designed his "Young head" portrait of the Queen, which he engraved, for the obverse, and Merlen engraved the reverse, depicting the royal arms inside a wreath, and likely played some part in designing it. The new coin was approved on 26 February 1838, and with the exception of 1840 and 1867, the "shield back" sovereign was struck at the Royal Mint in London every year from 1838 to 1874. Sovereigns struck in London with the shield design between 1863 and 1874 bear small numbers under the shield, representing which coinage die was used. Records of why the numbers were used are not known to survive, with one widely printed theory that they were used to track die wear. George Frederick Ansell states in his 1870 book The Royal Mint, Its Workings, Conduct, And Operations Fully And Practically Explained that "the reverse die has been made to carry, in addition to its recognised device, a small number, with a view to determine at which coining press, and on what particular day, the numbered die was used, that bad work might be traced to an individual."

By 1850, some £94 million in sovereigns and half sovereigns had been struck and circulated widely, well beyond Britain's shores, a dispersion aided by the British government, who saw the sovereign's use as an auxiliary to their imperialist ambitions. Gold is a soft metal, and the hazards of circulation tended to make sovereigns lightweight over time. In 1838, when the legacy of James Smithson was converted into gold in preparation for transmission to the United States, American authorities requested recently-struck sovereigns, likely to maximise the quantity of gold when the sovereigns were melted after arrival in the United States.

The weight of a newly-struck sovereign was intended to be 123.274 grains (7.98802 g). It ceased to be legal currency for £1 if found to weigh less than 122 1/2 grains (Note: Changed in 1821 from a minimum weight of 122.75 grains as experience had shown that to be too small a tolerance, and reaffirmed at the 1821 figure in 1838 and in 1843.) (i.e. a deficiency of 1 1/2 pence in gold per sovereign). Banks and merchants checked sovereigns quickly with small hand-held rocker balances. Commercial balances were set to the sovereign's minimum legal current weight rather than its original mint weight. A coin that tipped the balance passed; one that was too light was set aside for reweighing. Some versions combined this tipping test with slots or gauges for checking a coin's diameter and thickness, allowing underweight, clipped or counterfeit pieces to be detected without reading a scale. Rocker balances had already been used for earlier British gold coins and were adapted for the sovereign after its introduction in 1817. By the early 1840s, the Bank of England estimated that twenty per cent of the gold coins that came into its hands were lightweight. In part to boost the sovereign's reputation in trade, the Bank undertook a programme of recoinage, melting lightweight gold coins and using the gold for new, full-weight ones. Between 1842 and 1845, the Bank withdrew and had recoined some £14 million in lightweight gold, about one-third the amount of that metal in circulation. This not only kept the sovereign to standard, it probably removed most of the remaining guineas still in commerce. The unlucky holder of a lightweight gold coin could only turn it in as bullion, would lose at least 1 1/2 pence because of the lightness and often had to pay an equal amount to cover the Bank of England's costs. There was also increased quality control within the Royal Mint; by 1866, every gold and silver coin was weighed individually. The result of these efforts was that the sovereign became, in Sir John Clapham's later phrase, the "chief coin of the world".

The California Gold Rush and other discoveries of the 1840s and 1850s boosted the amount of available gold and also the number of sovereigns struck, with £150 million in sovereigns and half sovereigns coined between 1850 and 1875. The wear problem continued: it was estimated that, on average, a sovereign became lightweight after fifteen years in circulation. The Coinage Act 1870 tightened standards at the Royal Mint, requiring sovereigns to be individually tested at the annual Trial of the Pyx rather than in bulk. These standards resulted in a high rejection rate for newly coined sovereigns, though less than for the half sovereign, which sometimes exceeded 50 per cent. When the Royal Mint was rebuilt in 1882, a decisive factor in shutting down production for renovation rather than moving to a new mint elsewhere was the Bank of England's report that there was an abnormally large stock of sovereigns and that no harm would result if they could not be coined in London for a year. Advances in technology allowed sovereigns to be individually weighed by automated machines at the Bank of England by the 1890s, and efforts to keep the coin at full weight were aided by an 1889 Act of Parliament which allowed redemption of lightweight gold coin at full face value, with the loss from wear to fall upon the government. The Coinage Act 1889 also authorised the Bank of England to redeem worn gold coins from before Victoria's reign, but on 22 November 1890 all gold coins from before her reign were called in by Royal Proclamation and demonetised effective 28 February 1891. Owing to an ongoing programme to melt and recoin lightweight pieces, estimates of sovereigns in trade weighing less than the legal minimum had fallen to about four per cent by 1900.

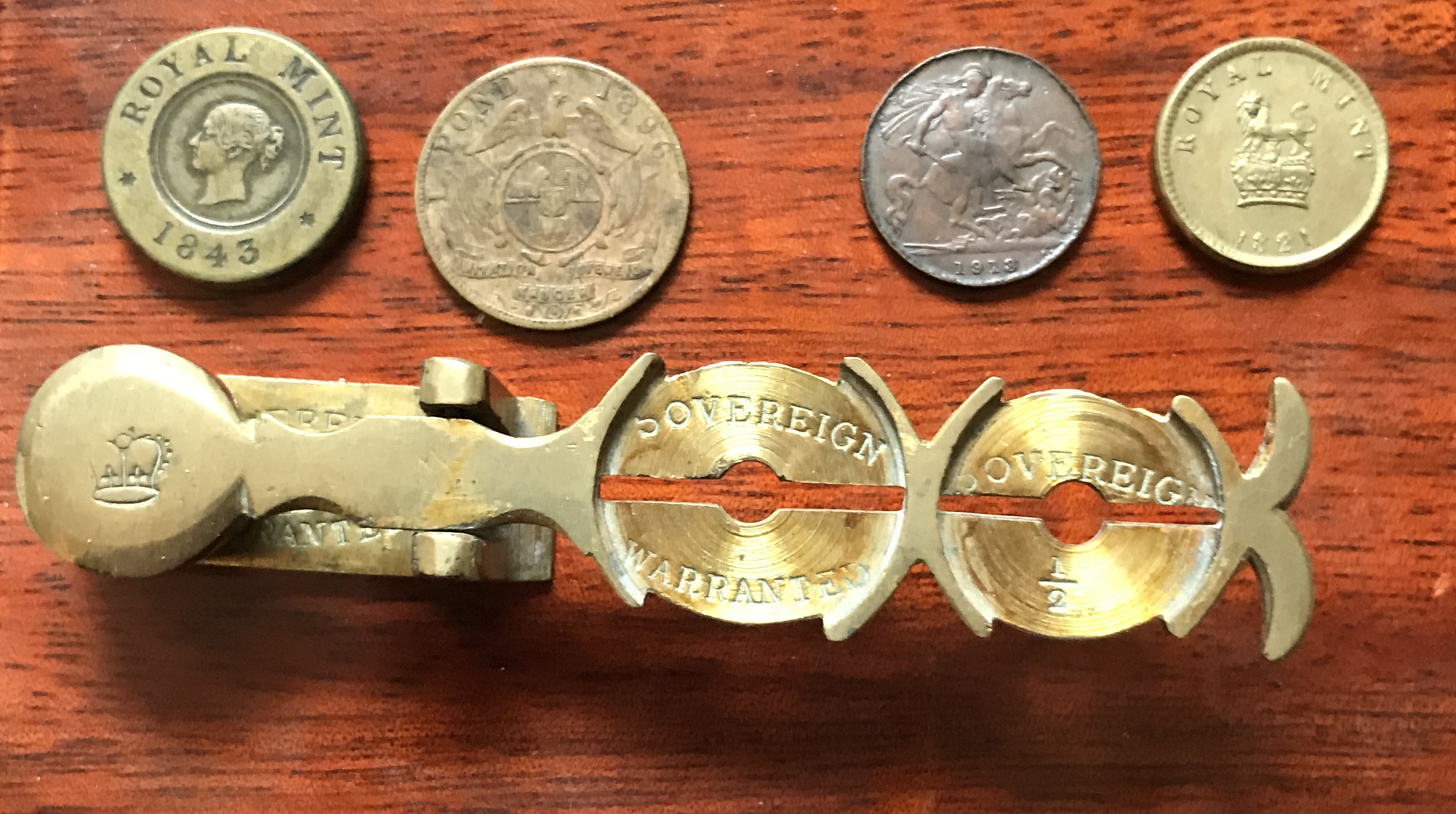
Counterfeit detector. A fake will pass one test (weight or fit) and fail the other.

The sovereign was seen in fiction: in Dickens' Oliver Twist, Mrs Bumble is paid £25 in sovereigns for her information. Joseph Conrad, in his novels set in Latin America, refers several times to ship's captains keeping sovereigns as a ready store of value. Although many sovereigns were melted down for recoining on reaching a foreign land (as were those for the Smithsonian), it was regarded as a circulating coin in dozens of British colonies and even in nations such as Brazil and Portugal; the latter accepted it at a value of 4,500 reis.

In 1871, the Deputy Master of the Mint, Charles William Fremantle, restored the Pistrucci George and Dragon design to the sovereign, as part of a drive to beautify the coinage. The return of Saint George was approved by the Queen, and authorised by an Order in Council dated 14 January 1871. The two designs were struck side by side in London from 1871 to 1874, and at the Australian branch mints until 1887, after which the Pistrucci design alone was used. The saint returned to the rarely-struck two- and five-pound pieces in 1887, and was placed on the half sovereign in 1893. Wyon's "Young head" of Queen Victoria for the sovereign's obverse was struck from 1838 until 1887, when it was replaced by the "Jubilee head" by Joseph Boehm. That obverse was criticised and was replaced in 1893 by the "Old head" by Thomas Brock. Victoria's death in 1901 led to a new obverse for her son and successor, Edward VII by George William de Saulles, which began production in 1902; Edward's death in 1910 necessitated a new obverse for his son, George V by Bertram Mackennal. Pistrucci's George and Dragon design continued on the reverse.

== Branch mint coinage ==
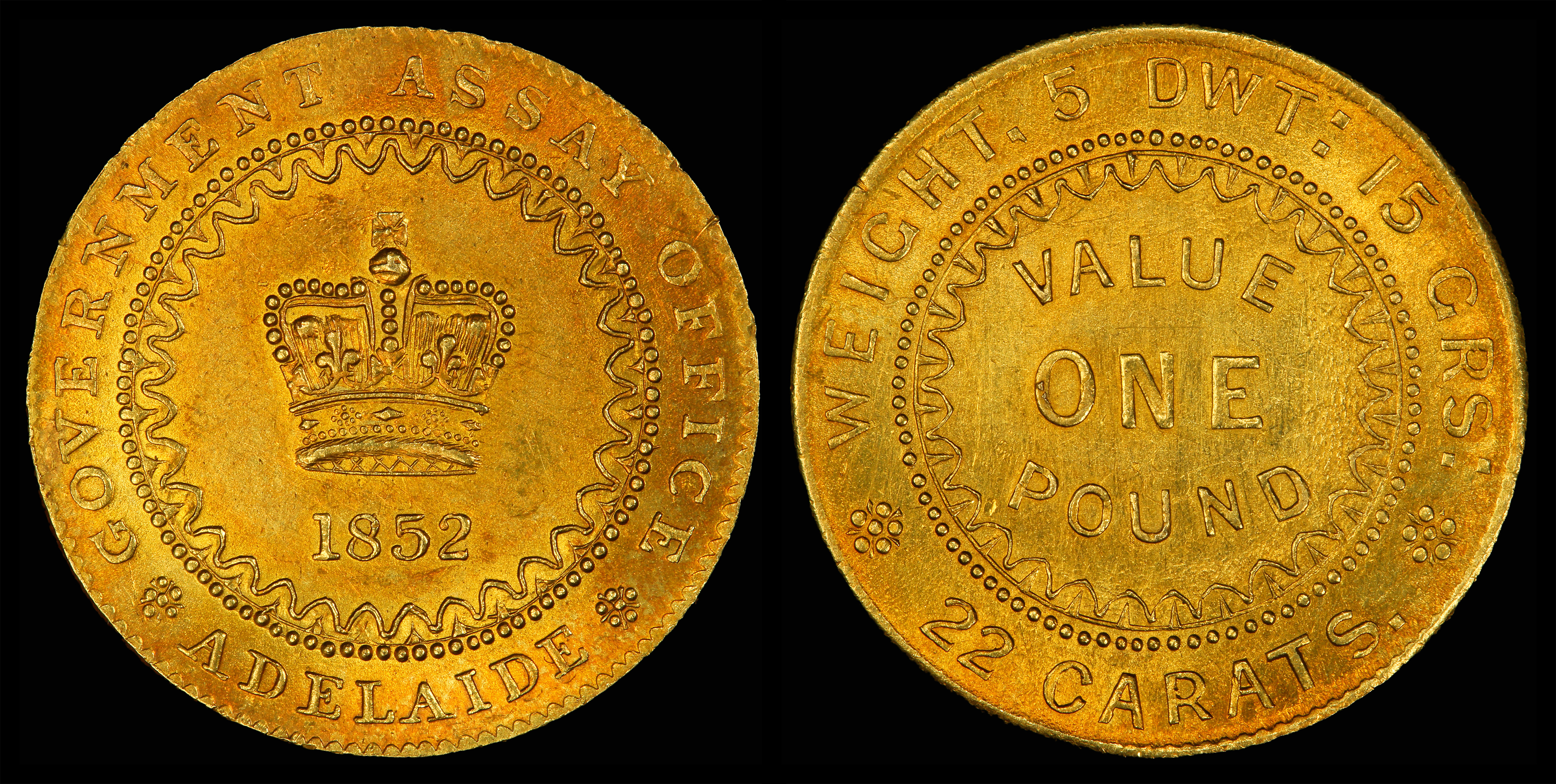
The 1852 Adelaide Pound (on average) contains 8.75 grams of gold (0.917 fine) and weighs 0.258 of an ounce.

The 1851 discovery of gold in Australia quickly led to calls from the local populace for the establishment of a branch of the Royal Mint in the colonies there. Authorities in Adelaide did not wait for London to act, but set up an assay office, striking what became known as the "Adelaide Pound". In 1853, an Order in Council approved the establishment of the Sydney Mint; the Melbourne Mint would follow in 1872, and the Perth Mint in 1899. The act which regulated currency in New South Wales came into force on 18 July 1855 and stipulated that the gold coins were to be called sovereigns and half sovereigns. They were also to be the same weight, fineness and value as other sovereigns.

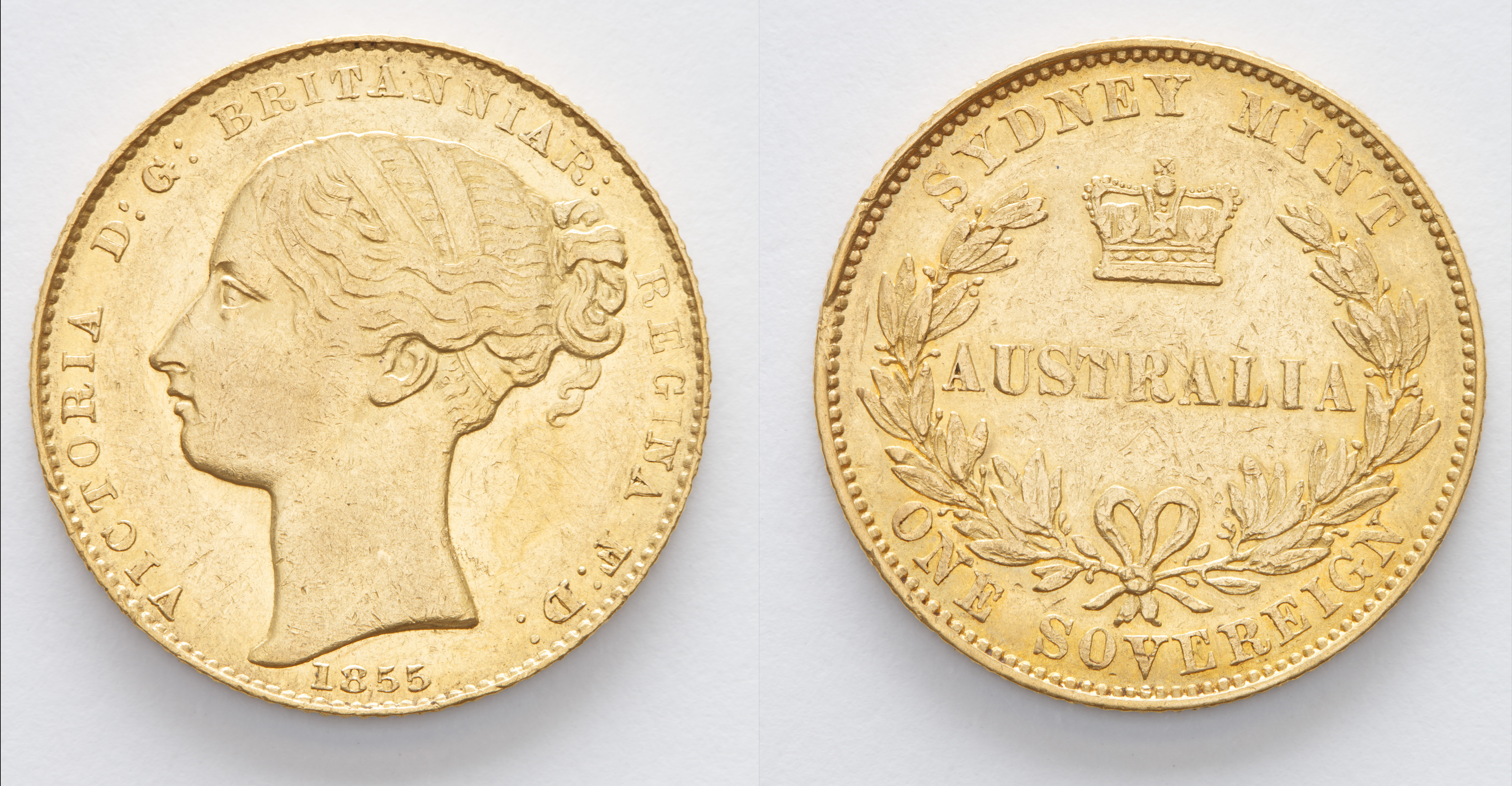
Sovereign, Sydney Mint, 1855

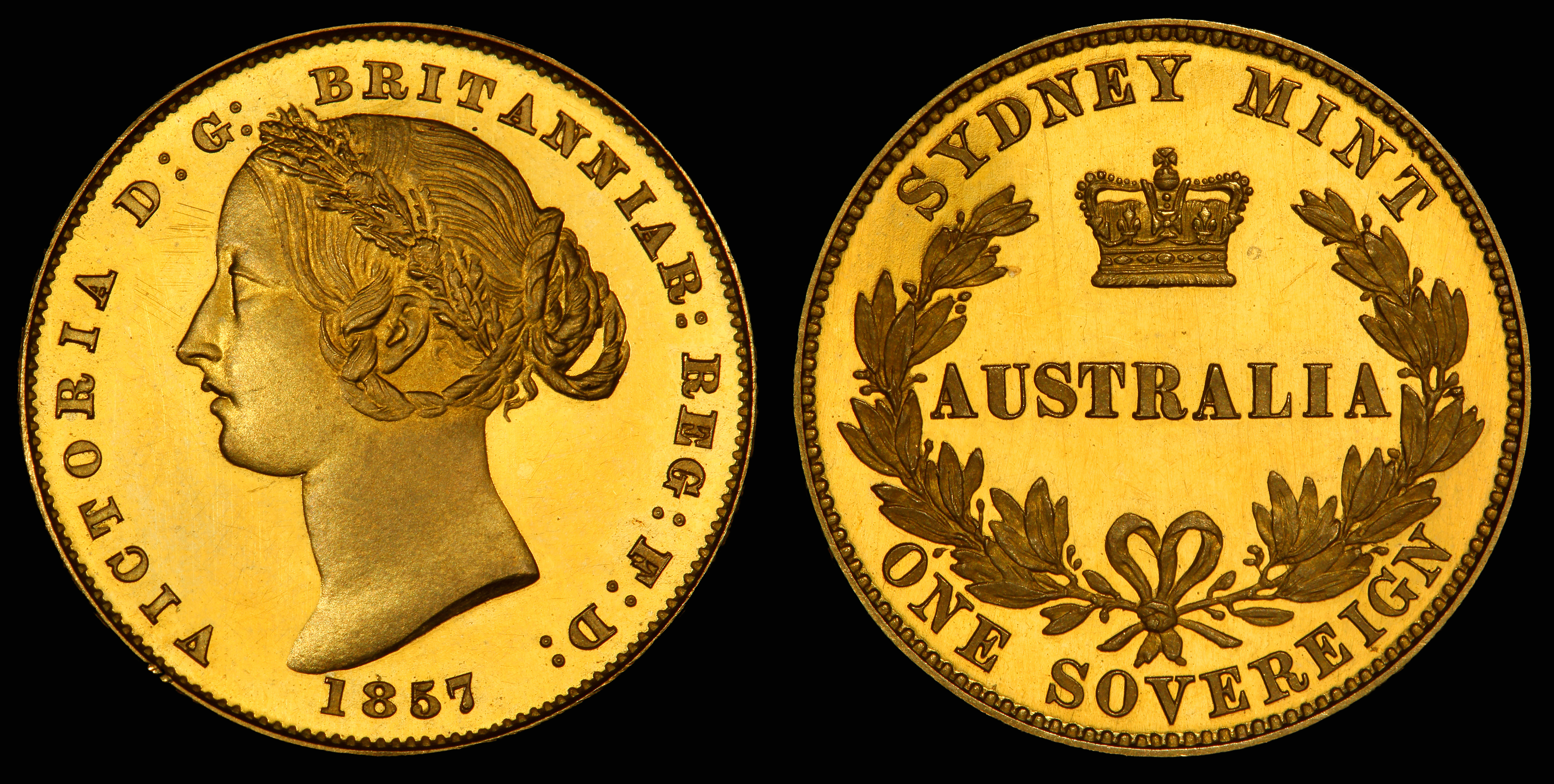
Sovereign, Sydney Mint, 1857

Sydney-minted sovereigns, c. 1857–1870, depicted a bust of Victoria similar to those struck in Britain, but with a wreath of banksia, native to Australia, in her hair. The reverse was distinctive as well, with the name of the mint, the word AUSTRALIA and the denomination ONE SOVEREIGN on the reverse. These coins were not initially legal tender outside Australia, as there were concerns about the design and about the light colour of the gold used (due to a higher percentage of silver in the alloy), but from 1866 Australian sovereigns were legal tender alongside those struck in London. Beginning in 1870, the designs were those used in London, though with a mint mark "S" or "M" (or, later, "P") denoting their origin. The mints at Melbourne and Sydney were allowed to continue striking the shield design even though it had been abandoned at the London facility, and did so until 1887 due to local popularity. The large issues of the colonial mints meant that by 1900, about forty per cent of the sovereigns circulating in Britain were from Australia. Dies for the Australian coinage were made at London.

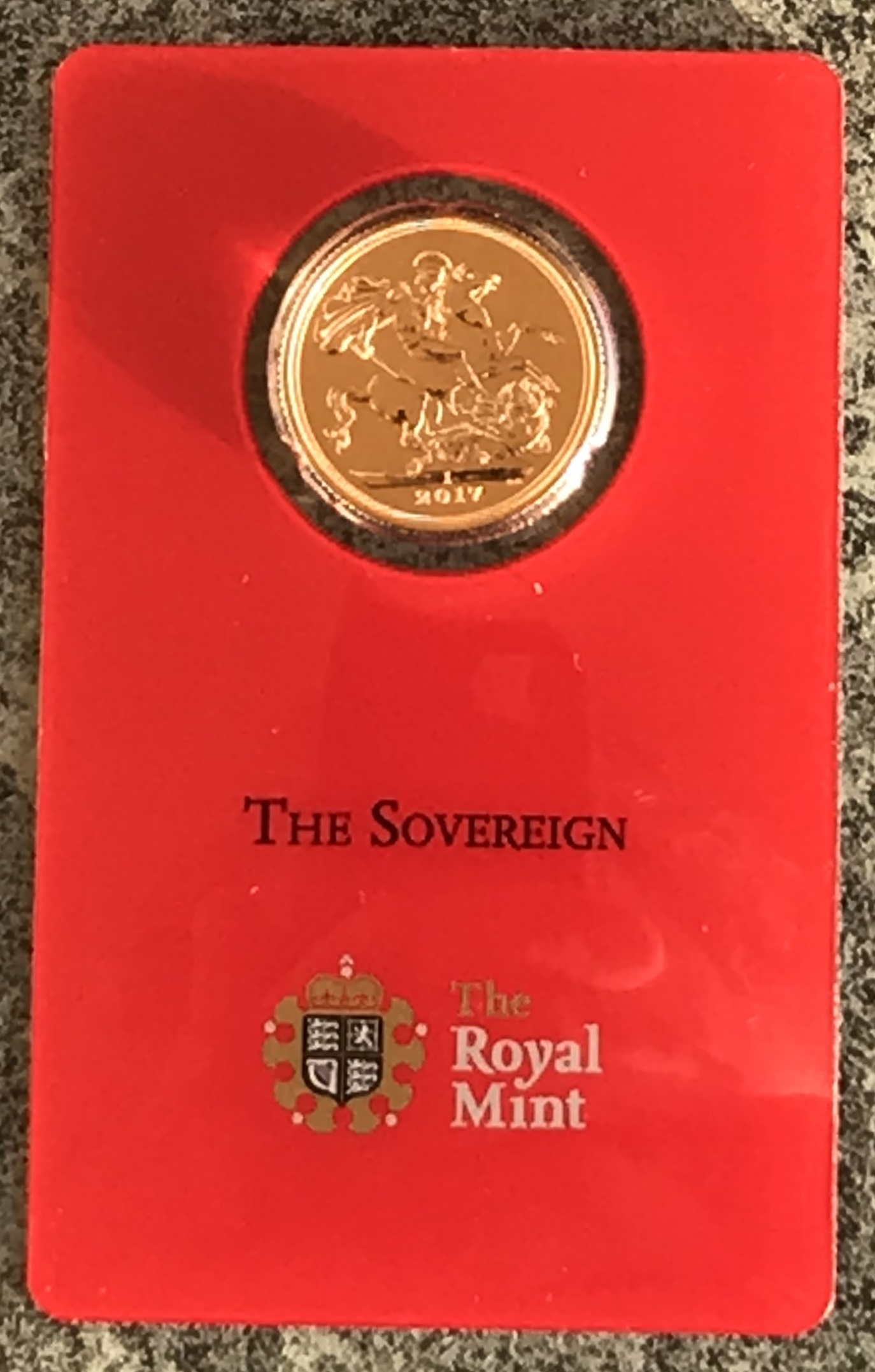
2017-I sovereign in card of issue

Following the Klondike Gold Rush in the late 1890s, the Canadian Government asked for the establishment of a Royal Mint branch in Canada. It was not until 1908 that what is now the Royal Canadian Mint, in Ottawa, opened, and it struck sovereigns with the mint mark "C" from 1908 to 1919, except 1912 and 1915, each year in small numbers. Branch mints at Bombay (1918; mint mark "I") and Pretoria (1923–1932; mint mark "SA") also struck sovereigns. Melbourne and Perth stopped striking sovereigns after 1931, with Sydney having closed in 1926. The 1932 sovereigns struck at Pretoria were the last to be issued intended as currency at their face value.

To address the high demand for gold coins in the Indian market, which does not allow gold coins to be imported, the minting of gold sovereigns in India with mint mark I has resumed since 2013. Indian/Swiss joint venture company MMTC-PAMP mints under licence in its facility close to Delhi with full quality control from the Royal Mint. The coins are legal tender in the United Kingdom.

== Trade coin (1914–1979) ==
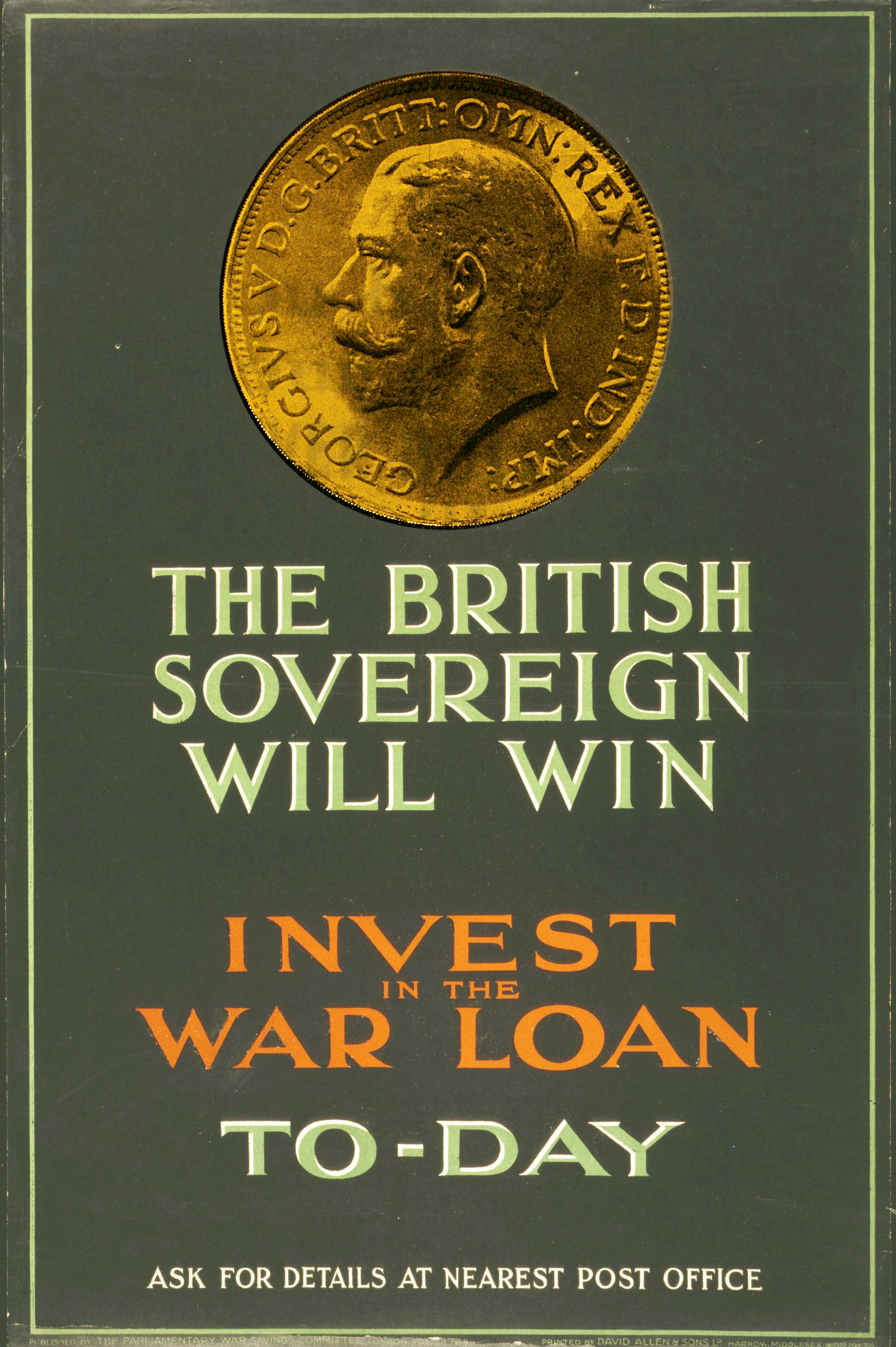
First World War propaganda poster featuring the sovereign coin

In the late 19th century, several Chancellors of the Exchequer had questioned the wisdom of having much of Britain's stock of gold used in coinage. Lord Randolph Churchill proposed relying less on gold coinage and moving to high-value silver coins, and the short-lived double florin or four-shilling piece is a legacy of his views. Churchill's successor, George Goschen, urged issuing banknotes to replace the gold coins, saying he preferred £20 million in gold in the Bank of England to thirty million sovereigns in the hands of the public. Fears that widespread forgery of banknotes would shake confidence in the pound ended his proposal.

In March 1914, John Maynard Keynes noted that the large quantities of gold arriving from South Africa were making the sovereign even more important. "The combination of the demand for sovereigns in India and Egypt with London's situation as the distributing centre of the South African gold is rapidly establishing the sovereign as the predominant gold coin of the world. Possibly it may be destined to hold in the future the same kind of international position as was held for several centuries, in the days of a silver standard, by the Mexican dollar."

As Britain moved towards war in the July Crisis of 1914, many sought to convert Bank of England notes into gold, and the bank's reserves of the metal fell from £27 million on 29 July to £11 million on 1 August. Following the declaration of war against Germany on 4 August, the government circulated one-pound and ten-shilling banknotes in place of the sovereign and half sovereign. Restrictions were placed on sending gold abroad, and the melting-down of coin was made an offence. Not all were enthusiastic about the change from gold to paper: J.J. Cullimore Allen, in his 1965 book on sovereigns, recalled meeting his first payroll after the change to banknotes, with the workers dubious about the banknotes and initially asking to be paid in gold. Allen converted five sovereigns from his own pocket into notes, and the workers made no further objection. Conversion into gold was not forbidden, but the Chancellor, David Lloyd George, made it clear that such actions would be unpatriotic and would harm the war effort. Few insisted on payment in gold in the face of such appeals, and by mid-1915, the sovereign was rarely seen in London commerce. The coin was depicted on propaganda posters, which urged support for the war.

Although sovereigns continued to be struck at London until the end of 1917, they were mostly held as part of the nation's gold reserves, or were paid out for war debts to the United States. They were still used as currency in some foreign countries, especially in the Middle East. Sovereigns continued to be struck at the Australian mints, where different economic circumstances prevailed. After the war, the sovereign did not return to commerce in Britain, with the pieces usually worth more as gold than as currency. In 1925, the Chancellor, Winston Churchill, secured the passage of the Gold Standard Act 1925, restoring Britain to that standard, but with gold to be kept in reserve rather than as a means of circulation. The effort failed—Churchill regarded it as the worst mistake of his life—but some lightweight sovereigns were melted and restruck dated 1925, and were released only later. Many of the Australian pieces struck in the postwar period were to back currency, while the South African sovereigns were mostly for export and to pay workers at the gold mines.

By the time Edward VIII came to the throne in 1936, there was no question of issuing sovereigns for circulation, but pieces were prepared as part of the traditional proof set of coins issued in the coronation year. With a bust of King Edward by Humphrey Paget and the date 1937, these sovereigns were not authorised by royal proclamation prior to Edward VIII's abdication in December 1936, and are considered pattern coins. Extremely rare, one sold in 2020 for £1,000,000, setting what was then a record (since broken) for a British coin. Sovereigns in proof condition dated 1937 were struck for Edward's brother and successor, George VI, also designed by Paget, the only sovereigns to bear George's effigy. The 1925-dated George V sovereign was restruck in 1949, 1951 and 1952, lowering the value of the original, of which only a few had hitherto been known. These were struck to meet the need for sovereigns, and to maintain the skills of the Royal Mint in striking them.

The sovereign remained popular as a trade coin in the Middle East and elsewhere following the Second World War. The small strikings of 1925-dated sovereigns in the postwar period were not enough to meet the demand, which was met in part by counterfeiters in Europe and the Middle East, who often put the full value of gold into the pieces. A counterfeiting prosecution was brought, to which the defence was made that the sovereign was no longer a current coin. The judge directed an acquittal although the sovereign remained legal tender under the Coinage Act 1870.

Sovereigns were struck in 1953, the coronation year of Elizabeth II, bearing the portrait of her by Mary Gillick, though the gold pieces were placed only in the major museums. A 1953 sovereign sold at auction in 2014 for £384,000. In 1957, the Treasury decided to defend the status of the sovereign, both by continuing prosecutions and by issuing new pieces with the current date. Elizabeth II sovereigns bearing Gillick's portrait were struck as bullion pieces between 1957 and 1959, and from 1962 to 1968. The counterfeiting problem was minimised by the striking of about 45,000,000 sovereigns by 1968, and efforts by Treasury solicitors which resulted in the sovereign's acceptance as legal tender by the highest courts of several European nations. In 1966, the Wilson government placed restrictions on the holding of gold coins to prevent hoarding against inflation, with collectors required to obtain a licence from the Bank of England. This proved ineffective, as it drove gold dealing underground, and was abandoned in 1970.

The sovereign's role in popular culture continued: in the 1957 novel From Russia, with Love, Q issues James Bond with a briefcase, the handle of which contains 50 sovereigns. When held at gunpoint on the Orient Express by Red Grant, Bond uses the gold to distract Grant, leading to the villain's undoing. The sovereign survived both decimalisation and the Royal Mint's move from London to Llantrisant, Wales. The last of the Gillick sovereigns had been struck in 1968; when production resumed in 1974, it was with a portrait by Arnold Machin. The last coin minted at Tower Hill, in 1975, was a sovereign.

== Bullion and collectors' coin (1979–present) ==
From 1979, the sovereign was issued as a coin for the bullion market, but was also struck by the Royal Mint in proof condition for collectors, and this issuance of proof coins has continued annually. In 1985, the Machin portrait of Elizabeth was replaced by one by Raphael Maklouf. Striking of bullion sovereigns had been suspended after 1982, and so the Maklouf portrait, struck every year but 1989 until the end of 1997, is seen on the sovereign only in proof condition. In 1989, a commemorative sovereign, the first, was issued for the 500th anniversary of Henry VII's sovereign. The coin, designed by Bernard Sindall, evokes the designs of that earlier piece, showing Elizabeth enthroned and facing front, as Henry appeared on the old English sovereign. The reverse of the 1489 piece depicts a double Tudor rose fronted by the royal arms; a similar design with updated arms graces the reverse of the 1989 sovereign.

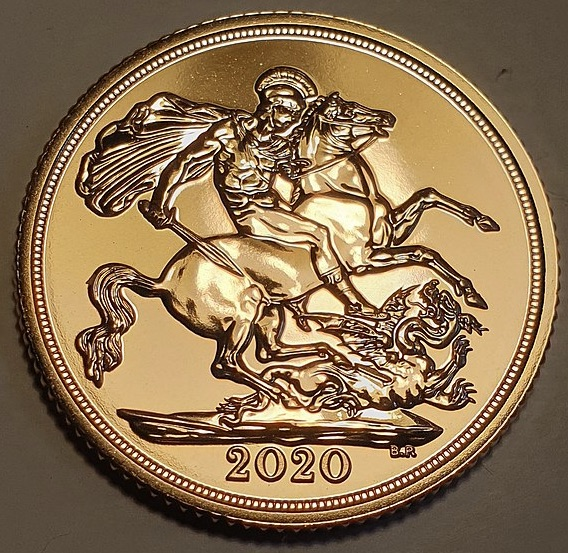
Reverse of the 2020 sovereign

Ian Rank-Broadley designed the fourth bust of Elizabeth to be used on the sovereign, and this went into use in 1998 and was used until 2015. Bullion sovereigns began to be issued again in 2000, and this has continued. A special reverse design was used in 2002 for the Golden Jubilee, with an adaptation of the royal arms on a shield by Timothy Noad recalling the 19th-century "shield back" sovereigns. The years 2005 and 2012 (the latter, Elizabeth's Diamond Jubilee) saw interpretations of the George and Dragon design, the first by Noad, the later by Paul Day. Day's design was used for the first strike-on-the-day sovereign which commemorated the jubilee. In 2009, the reverse was re-engraved using tools from the reign of George III in the hope of better capturing Pistrucci's design. A new portrait of the Queen by Jody Clark was introduced during 2015, and some sovereigns were issued with the new bust. The most recent special designs, in 2016 and 2017, were only for collectors. The 2016 collector's piece, for Elizabeth's 90th birthday, has a one-year-only portrait of her on the obverse designed by James Butler. The 2017 collector's piece returned to Pistrucci's original design of 1817 for the modern sovereign's 200th birthday, with the Garter belt and motto. A piedfort was also minted, and the bullion sovereign struck at Llantrisant, though retaining the customary design, was given a privy mark with the number 200. For 2022, a reverse design by Noad in honour of Elizabeth's Platinum Jubilee, depicting his interpretation of the Royal Coat of Arms, was used.

Following the death of Elizabeth II in September 2022, the Royal Mint announced the issue of sovereigns showing the new king, Charles III, on the obverse, and with a depiction of the Royal Arms by Clark, chosen in memory of Elizabeth and her long reign. When they began accepting orders on 15 November, there was such demand that visitors to the Mint's website were placed in virtual queues. For the Coronation of Charles III in May 2023, the Royal Mint issued sovereigns showing a crowned bust of the king, with the Pistrucci reverse. Both the crowned bust and the uncrowned one first issued in 2022 were designed by Martin Jennings. For 2024, Jennings' uncrowned portrait of Charles was paired with Pistrucci's reverse on each of the five sovereign denominations struck in proof, from the quarter sovereign to the five-pound piece.

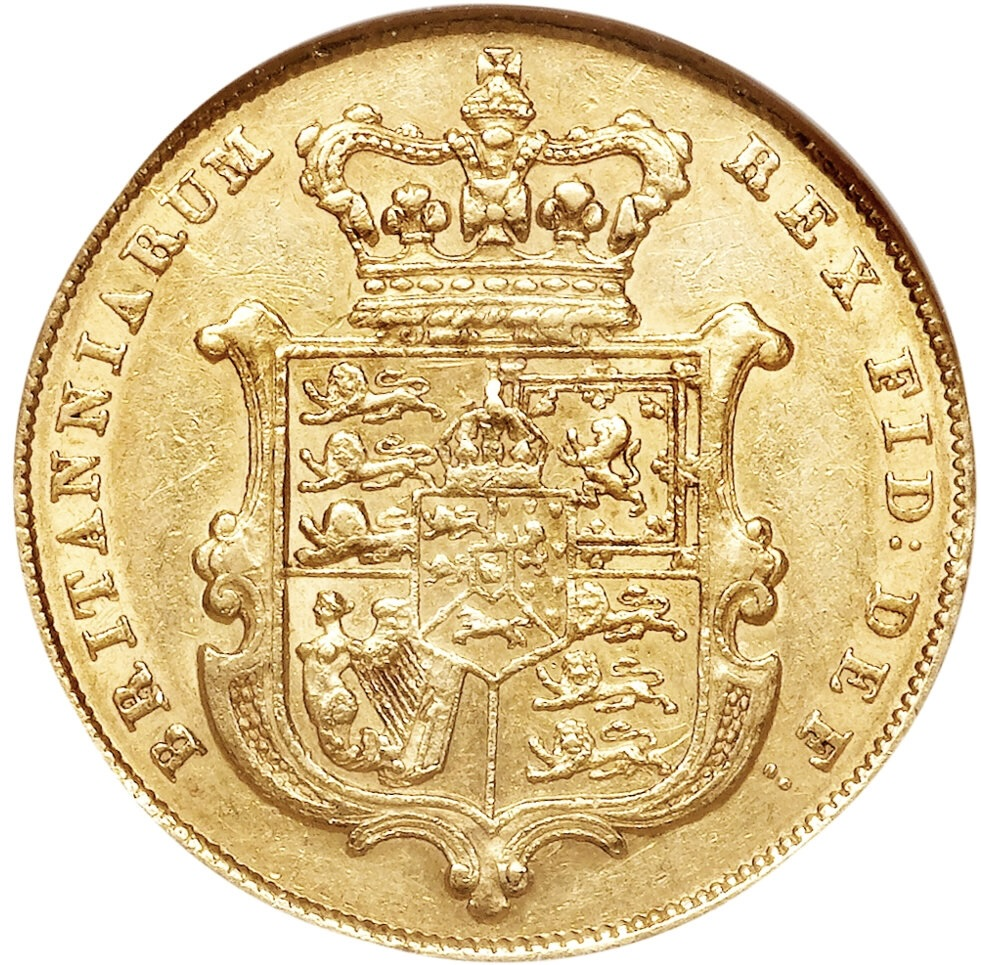
Jean Baptiste Merlen's 1825 reverse for the sovereign was reused 200 years later.

In 2024, the Royal Mint announced that sovereigns minted from 2026 onwards would return to the traditional yellow crown gold colour, a departure from the current alloy, which resembles rose gold due to its higher quantities of copper. Some 2025 sovereigns bear Pistrucci's reverse, others bear Merlen's Royal Arms reverse, first issued 200 years previously. A silver variant of the sovereign was also announced; this coin is minted to the same size and weight as the gold sovereign. For 2026, the silver sovereign continued, and the gold sovereign range returned to yellow-coloured metal from rose and added security features amid strong demand and price rises for gold. These new security features, exclusive to bullion sovereigns, include a legend around the reverse featuring the motto of the Order of the Garter, Honi soit qui mal y pense, and an optical security image on the obverse.

=== Collecting, other use and tax treatment ===
Many of the variant designs of the sovereign since 1989 have been intended to appeal to coin collectors, as have the other gold coins based on the sovereign, from the quarter sovereign to the five-sovereign piece. To expedite matters, the Royal Mint is authorised to sell gold sovereigns directly to the public, rather than having its output channelled through the Bank of England as was once the case. As a legal tender coin, the sovereign is exempt from capital gains tax for UK residents.

As well as being used as a circulating coin, the sovereign has entered fashion: some men in the 19th century placed one on their pocket watch chains (seen as a sign of integrity), and others carried them in a small purse linked to the chain. These customs vanished with the popularisation of the wrist watch. Women also have worn sovereigns, as bangles or ear rings. In the 21st century, the wearing of a sovereign ring has been seen as a sign of chav culture.

The staff carried by the Gentleman or Lady Usher of the Black Rod (known as Black Rod) as a symbol of office, and used to strike the door of the House of Commons of the United Kingdom during the State Opening of Parliament, has a sovereign inset into one of its ends.

Coin auction houses deal in rare sovereigns of earlier date, as do specialist dealers. As well as the 1937 Edward VIII and 1953 Elizabeth II sovereigns, rare dates in the series include the 1819 piece and the 1863 piece with the number "827" on the obverse in place of William Wyon's initials. The 827 likely is an ingot number, used for some sort of experiment, though research has not conclusively established this. Few 1879 sovereigns were struck at London, and those that remain are often well-worn. Only 24,768 of the Adelaide Pound were struck; surviving specimens are rare and highly prized. The sovereign itself has been the subject of commemoration; in 2005, the Perth Mint issued a gold coin with face value A$25, reproducing the reverse design of the pre-1871 Sydney Mint sovereigns.

== Silver Sovereign ==
In 2025, the Royal Mint issued the silver sovereign as a collector's proof and bullion coin. The first issue in 2025 consisted of 50,000 pieces and was struck in .999 fine silver. It was one of the first silver variants of the sovereign in the Mint's history. The reverse featured Benedetto Pistrucci's iconic St George and the Dragon design—which was especially significant in 2026, commemorating 500 years since the patron saint first appeared on English coins—while the obverse featured the official coinage portrait of King Charles III designed by Martin Jennings.

== Strike-on-the-Day ==
Strike-on-the-day pieces are limited-edition coins, mostly sovereigns, that were struck by the Royal Mint on the specific day of the occasion celebrated. The coins are issued in brilliant uncirculated condition or with a matte finish. Strike-on-the-day sovereigns are often minted with a plain edge, differentiating them from other milled-edge sovereigns.

Number	Date	Event	Design	Designer	Mintage
1	2 June 2012	Elizabeth II Diamond Jubilee	Modern Saint George and the Dragon	Paul Day	2,012
2	2 June 2013	Elizabeth II Diamond Coronation	Saint George and the Dragon	Benedetto Pistrucci	2,013
3	22 July 2013	Birth of Prince George of Wales	Saint George and the Dragon	Benedetto Pistrucci	2,013
4	22 July 2014	Prince George of Wales's 1st Birthday	Saint George and the Dragon	Benedetto Pistrucci	398
5	2 May 2015	Birth of Princess Charlotte of Wales	Saint George and the Dragon	Benedetto Pistrucci	743
6	22 July 2015	Prince George of Wales's 2nd Birthday	Saint George and the Dragon	Benedetto Pistrucci	400
7	11 June 2016	Elizabeth II's 90th Birthday	Saint George and the Dragon	Benedetto Pistrucci	499
8	6 February 2017	Elizabeth II's Sapphire Jubilee	Saint George and the Dragon	Benedetto Pistrucci	739
9	1 July 2017	200th Anniversary of Saint George and the Dragon Design	Saint George and the Dragon	Benedetto Pistrucci	1,817
10	20 November 2017	Elizabeth II's Platinum Wedding Anniversary	Saint George and the Dragon	Benedetto Pistrucci	744
11	2 June 2018	Elizabeth II's Sapphire Coronation	Saint George and the Dragon	Benedetto Pistrucci	650
12	22 July 2018	Prince George of Wales's 5th Birthday	Saint George and the Dragon	Benedetto Pistrucci	750
13	24 May 2019	200th Anniversary of the Birth of Victoria	Saint George and the Dragon	Benedetto Pistrucci	649
14	26 August 2019	200th Anniversary of the Birth of Prince Albert	Saint George and the Dragon	Benedetto Pistrucci	650
15	31 January 2020	Withdrawal from the European Union	Saint George and the Dragon	Benedetto Pistrucci	1,500
16	8 May 2020	75th Anniversary of Victory in Europe	Saint George and the Dragon	Benedetto Pistrucci	750
17	15 August 2020	75th Anniversary of Victory over Japan	Saint George and the Dragon	Benedetto Pistrucci	750
18	12 June 2021	Elizabeth II's 95th Birthday	Saint George and the Dragon	Benedetto Pistrucci	1,195
19	6 February 2022	Elizabeth II's Platinum Jubilee	Royal Coat of Arms	Timothy Noad	1,200
20	6 May 2023	Charles III's Coronation	Saint George and the Dragon	Benedetto Pistrucci	1,250
21	14 November 2023	Charles III's 75th Birthday	Saint George and the Dragon	Benedetto Pistrucci	750
22	6 June 2024	80th Anniversary of D-Day	Saint George and the Dragon	Benedetto Pistrucci	1,000
23	22 January 2026	125th Anniversary of the Death of Victoria	Saint George and the Dragon	Benedetto Pistrucci	600
24	21 April 2026	100th Anniversary of the Birth of Queen Elizabeth II	Saint George and the Dragon	Benedetto Pistrucci	1,000

== See also ==
- Quarter sovereign
- Half sovereign
- Double sovereign
- Crown gold
- Gold Britannia coin
- Krugerrand

== Bibliography ==
- Allen, James John Cullimore (1965). Sovereigns of the British Empire. London, United Kingdom: Spink & Son, Ltd. OCLC 493287074.
- Ansell, G. F. (1870). The Royal Mint: its working, conduct, and operations, fully and practically explained. London: Effingham Wilson.
- Celtel, André; Gullbekk, Svein H. (2006). The Sovereign and its Golden Antecedents. Oslo, Norway: Monetarius. ISBN 978-82-996755-6-7.
- Clancy, Kevin (2017) [2015]. A History of the Sovereign: Chief Coin of the World (second ed.). Llantrisant, Wales: Royal Mint Museum. ISBN 978-1-869917-00-5.
- Craig, John (2010) [1953]. The Mint (paperback ed.). Cambridge, United Kingdom: Cambridge University Press. ISBN 978-0-521-17077-2.
- Dyer, G.P.; Gaspar, G.P. (1992). "Reform, the New Technology and Tower Hill". In Challis, C.E. (ed.). A New History of the Royal Mint. Cambridge, United Kingdom: Cambridge University Press. pp. 398–606. ISBN 978-0-521-24026-0.
- Farey, Roderick (September 2014). "Benedetto Pistrucci (1782–1855), Part 1". Coin News: 51–53.
- Hayter, Henry Heylyn (1891). Victorian Year-Book for 1890–91 (18th ed.). Melbourne: Sands & McDougall Ltd.
- Hubbard, Arnold (14 July 2003). "How George III lost France: Or, Why Concessions Never Make Sense". Electric Review: A High Tory Online Journal of Politics, Art and Literature. Archived from the original on 5 December 2008.
- Josset, Christopher Robert (1962). Money in Britain. London: Frederick Warne and Co Ltd. OCLC 923302099.
- Keynes, John Maynard (March 1914). "Currency in 1912". The Economic Journal. 24 (93). Royal Economic Society: 152–157. doi:10.2307/2221837. JSTOR 2221837.
- Marsh, Michael A. (1996). Benedetto Pistrucci: Principal Engraver and Chief Medallist of the Royal Mint, 1783–1855. Hardwick, Cambridgeshire: Michael A. Marsh (Publications). ISBN 978-0-9506929-2-0.
- Marsh, Michael A. (2017) [1980]. The Gold Sovereign (revised ed.). Exeter, Devon: Token Publishing Ltd. ISBN 978-1-908828-36-1.
- Pollard, Graham (2004). "Pistrucci, Benedetto". Oxford Dictionary of National Biography (online ed.). Oxford University Press. doi:10.1093/ref:odnb/22314. (Subscription, Wikipedia Library access or UK public library membership required.)
- Rodgers, Kerry (June 2017). "Britain's Gold Sovereign". Coin News: 43–47.
- Seaby, Peter (1985). The Story of British Coinage. London: B. A. Seaby Ltd. ISBN 978-0-900652-74-5.
- Spink & Son Ltd (2022). Coins of England and the United Kingdom, Decimal Issues 2023 (9th ed.). London: Spink & Son Ltd. ISBN 978-1-912667-93-2.
