= Sovereign (English coin) =

English gold coin

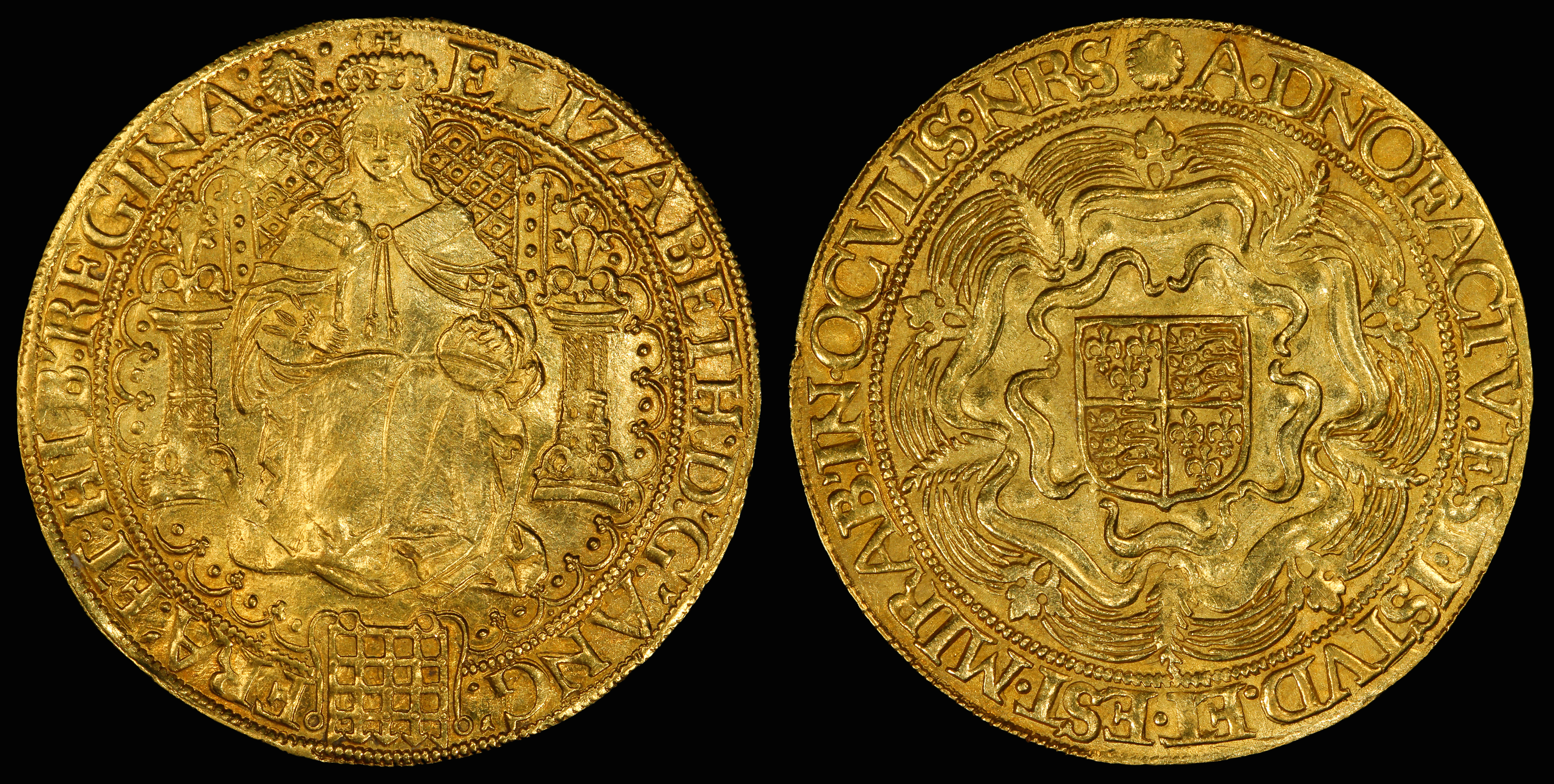
Sovereign of Elizabeth I (1583–1600), from the collection of the National Museum of American History, Washington, D.C.

The sovereign was a gold coin of the Kingdom of England first issued in 1489 under King Henry VII. The coin had a nominal value of one pound sterling, or twenty shillings. The sovereign was primarily an official piece of bullion and had no mark of value on its face. Nonetheless, it was the country's first coin to be valued at one pound.

The name derives from the large size and majestic portrait of the monarch (the "sovereign"), with the obverse of the first sovereigns showing the king's full face, sitting on a throne, while the reverse shows the Royal Arms of England and a Tudor double rose.

The first sovereigns were of 23-carat (95.83%) gold and weighed 240 grains, or half a troy ounce. King Henry VIII lessened the gold content to 22 carats, or 91.67%. Although this was part of what is called The Great Debasement, 22 carats became the gold coin standard in both the British Isles and later the United States, known as crown gold.

It had a diameter of 42 millimetres (1.7 in), and weighed 15.55 grams (0.500 oz t), twice the weight of the existing gold coin, the ryal. The new coin was struck in response to a large influx of gold into Europe from West Africa in the 1480s, and Henry at first called it the double ryal, but soon changed the name to sovereign. Too great in value to have any practical use in circulation, the original sovereign probably served as a presentation piece to be given to dignitaries. (Note: One pound in 1489 was equivalent to 33 days wages for a tradesman. See historical currency converter) A double sovereign in the form of a piedfort was occasionally created for such purposes too.

The inscription reads A DNO' FACTU' EST ISTUD ET EST MIRAB' IN OCULIS NRS—abbreviation for A DOMINO FACTUM EST ISTUD ET EST MIRABILE IN OCULIS NOSTRIS (Latin for "This is the Lord's doing and it is marvellous in our eyes", from Psalm 118).

== Replacement ==
King James I, when he came to the English throne in 1603, issued a sovereign in the year of his accession, but the following year, soon after he proclaimed himself King of Great Britain, he issued a proclamation for a new twenty-shilling piece called the unite, symbolising that James had merged the Scottish and English crowns.

The unite, and then the other short-lived laurel and broad, therefore took the sovereign's place in the 17th century, before the guinea became established. However, the guinea changed value to 21 shillings in 1717. It was not until 1817 that the 20 shilling (one pound sterling) coin was re-introduced – again named the sovereign, now a British coin, which continues to be issued to the present day.

== See also ==
- Half sovereign – the gold coin equivalent to half an English (and later, British) sovereign

== General and cited references ==
- Celtel, André; Gullbekk, Svein H. (2006). The Sovereign and Its Golden Antecedents. Oslo, Norway: Monetarius. ISBN 978-82-996755-6-7.
- Clancy, Kevin (2017) [2015]. A History of the Sovereign: Chief Coin of the World (Second ed.). Llantrisant, Wales: Royal Mint Museum. ISBN 978-1-869917-00-5.
- Marsh, Michael A. (2017) [1980]. The Gold Sovereign (Revised ed.). Exeter, Devon, UK: Token Publishing. ISBN 978-1-908828-36-1.
