= Unite (English coin) =

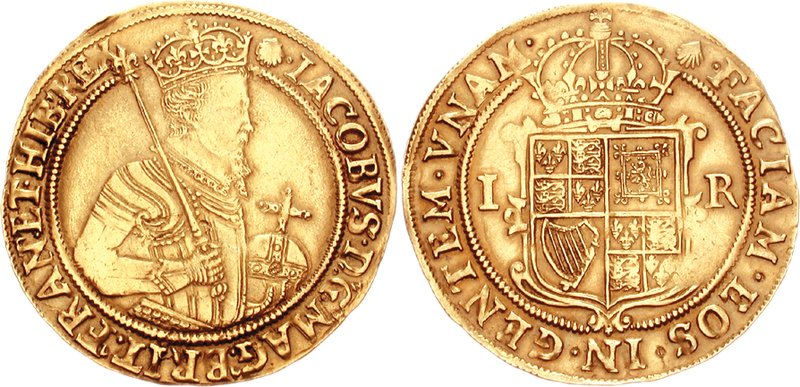
Obverse and reverse of a James I unite struck at the Tower Mint in 1606–1607.

The unite was an English gold coin first produced during the reign of King James I. It was named after the legends on the coin indicating the king's intention of uniting his two kingdoms of England and Scotland; the intention was that the coin would be used in both countries. The coin was also popularly known as the Jacobus, derived from the Latin form of James's name, Iacobus, which appeared in the coin's inscription.

The unite was valued at twenty shillings until 1612 when the increase in the value of gold throughout Europe caused it to be raised to twenty-two shillings. The name "Jacobus", however, did not consistently denote a single fixed monetary value and was used in seventeenth-century monetary sources with different values.

The coin was produced during James I's second coinage (1604–1619), and it was replaced in the third coinage by the Laurel worth twenty shillings. All the coins were produced at the Tower Mint in London.

== Name and terminology ==
The Dictionary of the Older Scottish Tongue records jacobus from 1612 and defines it as an English gold coin first issued under James VI and I. Its quotations include references to "old pieces called jacobus's" and to "twa jacobuses of gold"; a 1696 example gives the value as 26 shillings sterling per coin. Scottish usage provides further evidence that the term did not always correspond to a single fixed coin. The Scottish jurist Sir John Lauder, Lord Fountainhall generally called the larger of two gold coins a Jacobus and the smaller a Carolus. He also referred to the smaller coin as a "new Jacobus" and identified it as the 20-shilling sterling piece. The editors of Lauder's journal identify the larger coin as the 154-grain unite of James I and the smaller as the 140-grain gold piece introduced in England in 1619 as the laurel. They note that Lauder therefore used Jacobus for the larger unite while also using "new Jacobus" for the later 20-shilling piece.

"Jacobus" also remained in use after the unite ceased to be issued. Frey noted in 1917 that Jacobus was still used in the nineteenth century, citing Thomas Babington Macaulay's History of England (1855).

== Production ==
Several busts of the king were used for this denomination, who is shown looking to the right of the coin and is holding the orb and sceptre; the style of the king's beard varies during the issue. The legend on the obverse reads IACOBUS D G MA BRI FRA ET HI REX (Iacobus Dei Gratia Magnae Britanniae Franciae et Hiberniae Rex) – James by the grace of God King of Great Britain France and Ireland. The reverse shows a crowned shield which shows the arms of the four countries separating the letters IR – Iacobus Rex, King James, and the legend FACIAM EOS IN GENTEM UNAM ("I will make them one nation", from Ezekiel 37:22).

Numerous issues of gold unites valued at twenty shillings were produced at the Tower Mint throughout the reign of King Charles I (1625–1649), both when the mint was under the king's control and under Parliament's control. They depict the crowned bust of the king on the obverse, looking left, with the value "XX" appearing behind the king's head, and the legend CAROLUS D G MAG BR FR ET HI REX – Charles by the grace of God King of Great Britain France and Ireland.

The reverse shows a crown over a shield bearing the royal arms and the legend FLORENT CONCORDIA REGNA – Through concord kingdoms flourish. During the Civil War, provincial mints produced very rare unites, including at Chester, Oxford, Bristol, Exeter, Worcester and Shrewsbury.

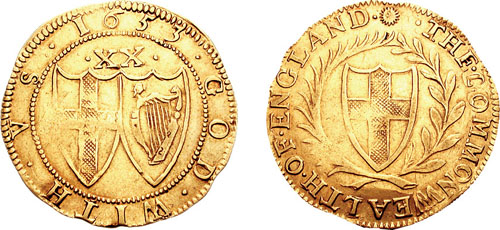
A Unite issued during the Commonwealth.

Gold unites were issued during the Commonwealth, this time bearing a legend exclusively in English: THE COMMONWEALTH OF ENGLAND on the obverse and GOD WITH US on the reverse. This was due to an association of Latin with Catholicism.

They were also issued during a period when hammered coins were issued under King Charles II (i.e. 1660–62), showing a left-facing bust of the king wearing a laurel and the legend CAROLUS II D G MAG BRIT FRAN ET HIB REX – there were two issues, the second indicating the value "XX" behind the king's head. The reverse shows a crown over the shield with the royal arms dividing the letters "CR" and the legend FLORENT CONCORDIA REGNA. The gold unite was replaced by the milled gold Guinea in 1663. A twenty shilling coin did not reappear until the Sovereign of 1817.

== Weight and value ==
The monetary value associated with a Jacobus varied between sources. In 1662, Samuel Pepys recorded in his diary that a deceased poulterer had left "40,000 Jacobs in gold". A note in the 1893 edition of the diary edited by Henry B. Wheatley identifies a Jacobus as a gold coin worth 25 shillings and named after James I.

Isaac Newton, while Warden of the Mint, discussed Jacobuses in a letter to John Locke dated 19 September 1698. He wrote:

The Jacobus piece coin'd for 20 shillings is the 41th part of a pound Troy, and a Carolus 20s piece is of the same weight. But a broad Jacobus (as I find by weighing some of them) is the 38th part of a pound Troy.

These weights correspond to approximately 9.10 grams and 9.82 grams respectively. Newton's distinction illustrates the variation in both weight and terminology among gold coins known as Jacobuses in the late seventeenth century.

== See also ==
- Triple unite
- British coinage
