= Royal Mint =

Government-owned mint that produces coins for the United Kingdom

The Royal Mint Limited
- Trade name: The Royal Mint
- Type: State-owned limited company
- Industry: Coin and medal production
- Founded: c. 886 (origins); 1279 (unified system); 16 July 2009 (current legal structure)
- Headquarters: Llantrisant, Wales, UK
- Area served: United Kingdom and British Overseas Territories
- Key people: Anne Jessopp (Chief Executive)
- Products: Coins; Medals; Bullion
- Revenue: £1.3 billion (2024)
- Operating income: –£1.9 million (2024)
- Net income: –£4.1 million (2024)
- Total assets: £73.7 million (Note: Displaying net assets.) (2024)
- Total equity: £73.7 million (2024)
- Owner: HM Treasury
- Number of employees: 899 (2024)
- Website: www.royalmint.com

The Royal Mint Limited is the United Kingdom's official maker of British coins. It is currently located in Llantrisant, Wales, where it moved in 1968.

The Royal Mint is a limited company that is wholly owned by His Majesty's Treasury and is under an exclusive contract to supply the nation's coinage. As well as minting circulating coins for the UK and international markets, The Royal Mint is a leading provider of precious metal products.

The Royal Mint was historically part of a series of mints that became centralised to produce coins for the Kingdom of England, all of Great Britain, the United Kingdom, and nations across the Commonwealth.

The Royal Mint operated within the Tower of London for several hundred years before moving to what is now called Royal Mint Court, where it remained until the 1960s. As Britain followed the rest of the world in decimalising its currency, the Mint moved from London to a new 38-acre (15 ha) plant in Llantrisant, Glamorgan, Wales, where it has remained since.

Since 2018 The Royal Mint has been evolving its business to help offset declining cash use. It has expanded into precious metals investment, historic coins, and luxury collectibles, which saw it deliver an operating profit of £12.7 million in 2020–2021.

In 2022 The Royal Mint announced it was building a new plant in South Wales to recover precious metals from electronic waste. The first of this sustainably sourced gold is already being used in a new jewellery division – 886 by The Royal Mint – named in celebration of its symbolic founding date.

== History ==
=== Origin ===
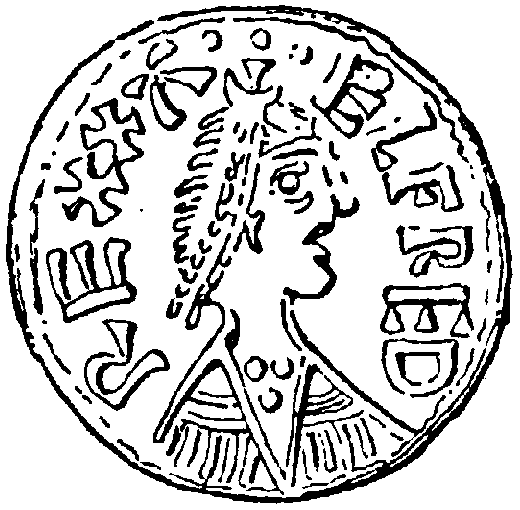
Coin of Alfred the Great. Medieval Latin inscription: ELFRED[US] REXX [sic] ("Alfred the King")

The history of coins in Great Britain can be traced back to the second century BC when they were introduced by Celtic tribes from across the English Channel. The first record of coins being minted in Britain is attributed to Kentish tribes such as the Cantii who around 80–60 BC imitated those of Marseille through casting instead of hammering. After the Romans began their invasion of Britain in AD 43, they set up mints across the land, which produced Roman coins for some 40 years before closing. A mint in London reopened briefly in 383 until closing swiftly as Roman rule in Britain came to an end. For the next 200 years, no coins appear to have been minted in Britain until the emergence of English kingdoms in the sixth and seventh centuries. By 650, as many as 30 mints are recorded across Britain.

=== 1279 to 1672 ===
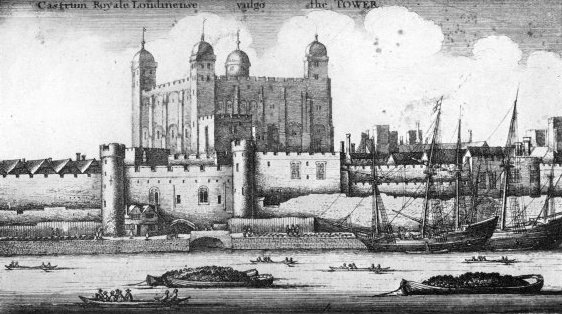
The Tower of London in 1647

In 1279, the country's numerous mints were unified under a single system whereby control was centralised to the mint within the Tower of London. Mints outside London were reduced, with only a few local and episcopal mints continuing to operate. Pipe rolls containing the financial records of the London mint show an expenditure of £729 17s 8 1/2d and records of timber bought for workshops.

Individual roles at the mint were well established by 1464. The master worker was charged with hiring engravers and managing moneyers, while the Warden was responsible for witnessing the delivery of dies. A specialist mint board was set up in 1472 to enact a 23 February indenture that vested the mint's responsibilities into three main roles: a warden, a master and comptroller.

In the early 16th century, mainland Europe was in the middle of an economic expansion, but England was suffering from financial difficulties brought on by excessive government spending. By the 1540s, wars with France and Scotland led Henry VIII to enact The Great Debasement, which saw the amount of precious metal in coins significantly reduced. In order to strengthen control of the country's currency, monasteries were dissolved, which effectively ended major coin production outside London.

In 1603, the Union of Crowns of England and Scotland under King James I led to a partial union of the two kingdoms' currencies, the pound Scots and the pound sterling. Because Scotland had heavily debased its silver coins, a Scots mark was worth just 13 1/2 pence while an English mark was worth 6 shillings 8 pence (80 pence). To bridge the difference between the values, unofficial supplementary token coins, often made from lead, were made by unauthorised minters across the country. By 1612, there were 3,000 such unlicensed mints producing these tokens, none of them paying anything to the government. The Royal Mint, not wanting to divert manpower from minting more profitable gold and silver coins, hired outside agent Lord Harington who, under licence, started issuing copper farthings in 1613. Private licenses to mint these coins were revoked in 1644, which led traders to resume minting their own supplementary tokens. In 1672, the Royal Mint finally took over the production of copper coinage.

==== Civil War mints ====
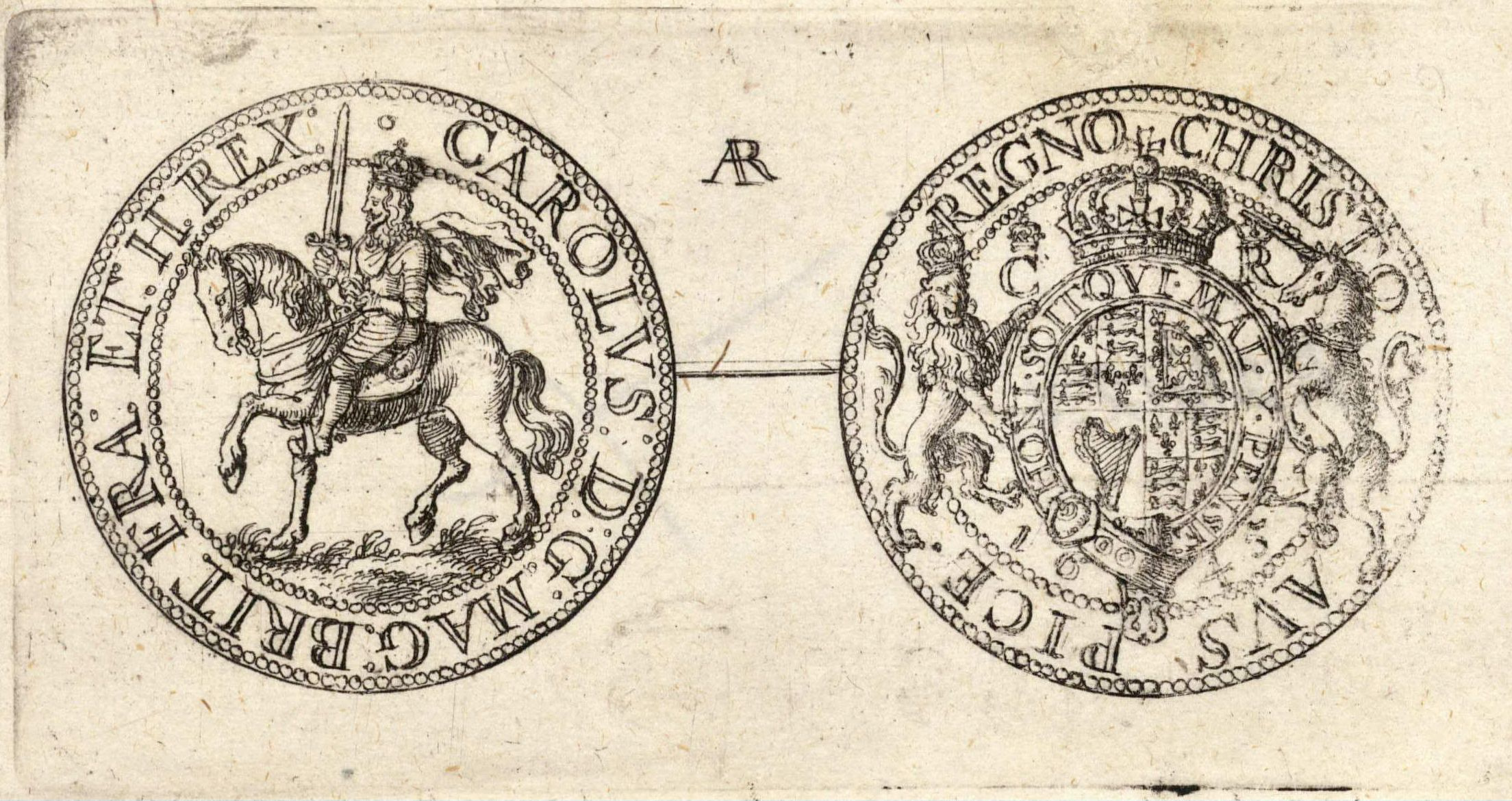
Charles I Civil War half-crown

In 1630, sometime before the outbreak of the English Civil War, England signed a treaty with Spain that ensured a steady supply of silver bullion to the Tower mint. Additional branch mints to aid the one in London were set up, including one at Aberystwyth Castle in Wales. In 1642, parliament seized control of the Tower mint. After Charles I tried to arrest the Five Members, he was forced to flee London and established at least 16 emergency mints across the British Isles in Carlisle, Chester, Colchester, Cork, Dublin, Edinburgh, Exeter, Newark, Pontefract, Salisbury, Scarborough, parts of Cornwall including Truro, Weymouth, Worcester, and York (see also siege money).

After raising the royal standard in Nottingham, marking the beginning of the civil war, Charles called on loyalist mining engineer Thomas Bushell, the owner of a mint and silver mine in Aberystwyth, to move his operations to the royalist-held Shrewsbury, possibly within the grounds of Shrewsbury Castle. However, this mint was short-lived, operating for no more than three months before Charles ordered Bushell to relocate the mint to his headquarters in the royal capital of Oxford. The new Oxford mint was established on 15 December 1642 in New Inn Hall, the present site of St Peter's College. There, silver plates and foreign coins were melted down and, in some cases, just hammered into shape to produce coins quickly. Bushell was appointed the mint's warden and master-worker, and he laboured alongside notable engravers Nicholas Briot, Thomas Rawlins and Nicholas Burghers, the last of whom was appointed Graver of Seals, Stamps, and Medals in 1643. When Prince Rupert took control of Oxford that same year, Bushell was ordered to move to Bristol Castle, where he continued minting coins until it fell to parliamentary control on 11 September 1645, effectively ending Bushell's involvement in the civil war mints.

In November 1642, the king ordered royalist MP Richard Vyvyan to build one or more mints in Cornwall, where he was instructed to mint coins from whatever bullion could be obtained and deliver them to Ralph Hopton, a commander of royalist troops in the region. Vyvyan built a mint in Truro and was its Master until 1646, when it was captured by parliamentarians. In December 1642, the parliamentarians set up a mint in nearby Exeter, which had been under parliamentary control since the beginning of the war and was under constant threat of attack by loyalist troops. In September 1643, the town was captured by the Cornish Royalist Army led by Prince Maurice, leading Vyvyan to move his nearby mint in Truro to the captured town. The exact location of the mint in Exeter is unknown; however, maps from the time show a street named Old Mint Lane near Friernhay, which was to be the site of a 1696 Recoinage mint. Much less is known about the mint's employees, with only Richard Vyvyan and clerk Thomas Hawkes recorded.

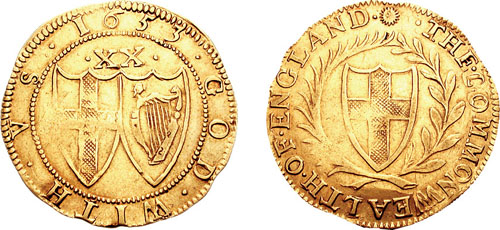
Commonwealth Unite 1653

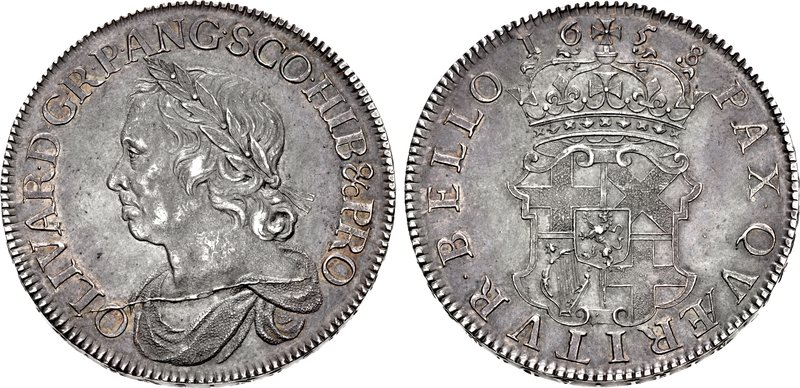
1658 Cromwell Crown

Following Charles I's execution in 1649, the newly formed Commonwealth of England established its own set of coins, which for the first time used English rather than Latin and were more plainly designed than those issued under the monarchy. The government invited French engineer Peter Blondeau, who worked at the Paris Mint, to come to London in 1649 in the hope of modernising the country's minting process. In France, hammer-stuck coins had been banned from the Paris Mint since 1639 and replaced with milled coinage. Blondeau began his testing in May 1651 in Drury House. He initially produced milled silver pattern pieces of half-crowns, shillings and sixpences; however rival moneyers continued using the old hammering method. In 1656, Lord Protector Oliver Cromwell ordered engraver Thomas Simon to cut a series of dies featuring his bust and for them to be minted using the new milled method. Few of Cromwell's coins entered circulation; Cromwell died in 1658 and the Commonwealth collapsed two years later. Without Cromwell's backing of milled coinage, Blondeau returned to France, leaving England to continue minting hammer-struck coins.

=== 1660 to 1805 ===
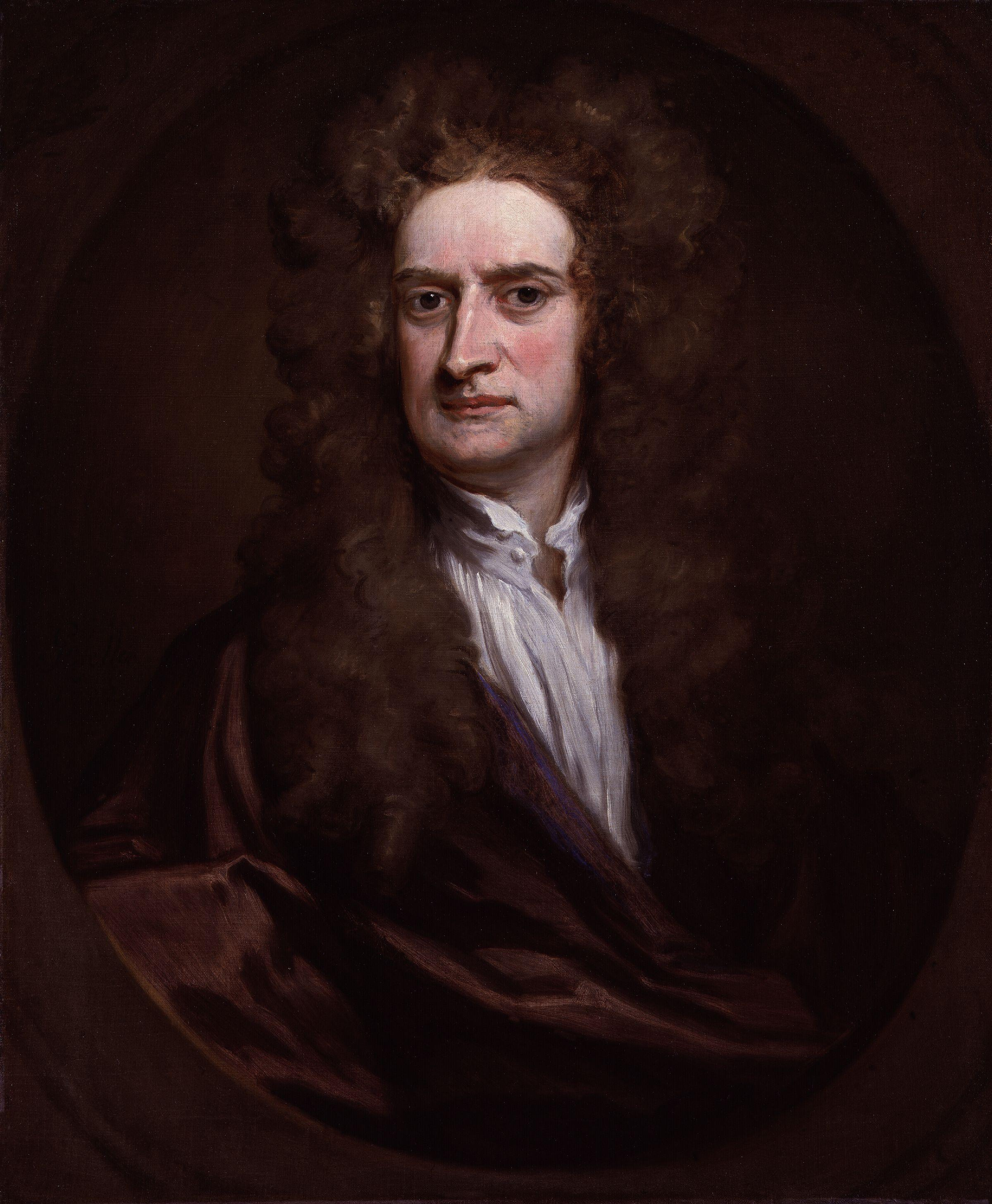
Isaac Newton in 1702

In 1662, after previous attempts to introduce milled coinage into Britain had failed, the restored monarch Charles II recalled Peter Blondeau to establish a permanent machine-made coinage. Despite the introduction of the newer, milled coins, like the old hammered coins they suffered heavily from counterfeiting and clipping. To combat this the text Decus et tutamen ("An ornament and a safeguard") was added to some coin rims.

After the Glorious Revolution of 1688, when James II was ousted from power, parliament took over control of the mint from the Crown, which had until then allowed the mint to act as an independent body producing coins on behalf of the government.

Under the patronage of Charles Montagu, 1st Earl of Halifax, Isaac Newton became the mint's warden in 1696. His role, intended to be a sinecure, was taken seriously by Newton, who went about trying to combat the country's growing problems with counterfeiting. By this time, forgeries accounted for 10% of the country's coinage, clipping was commonplace and the value of the silver in coins had surpassed their face value. King William III initiated the Great Recoinage of 1696 whereby all coins were removed from circulation, and enacted the Coin Act 1696, making it high treason to own or possess counterfeiting equipment. Satellite mints to aid in the recoinage were established in Bristol, Chester, Exeter, Norwich, and York, with returned coins being valued by weight, not face value.

The Acts of Union 1707 united England and Scotland into one country, leading London to take over production of Scotland's currency and thus replacing Scotland's Pound Scots with the English Pound sterling. As a result, the Edinburgh mint closed on 4 August 1710. As Britain's empire continued to expand, so too did the need to supply its coinage. This, along with the need for new mint machinery and cramped conditions within the Tower of London, led to plans for the mint to move to nearby East Smithfield.

=== 1805 to 1914 ===
==== Tower Hill ====
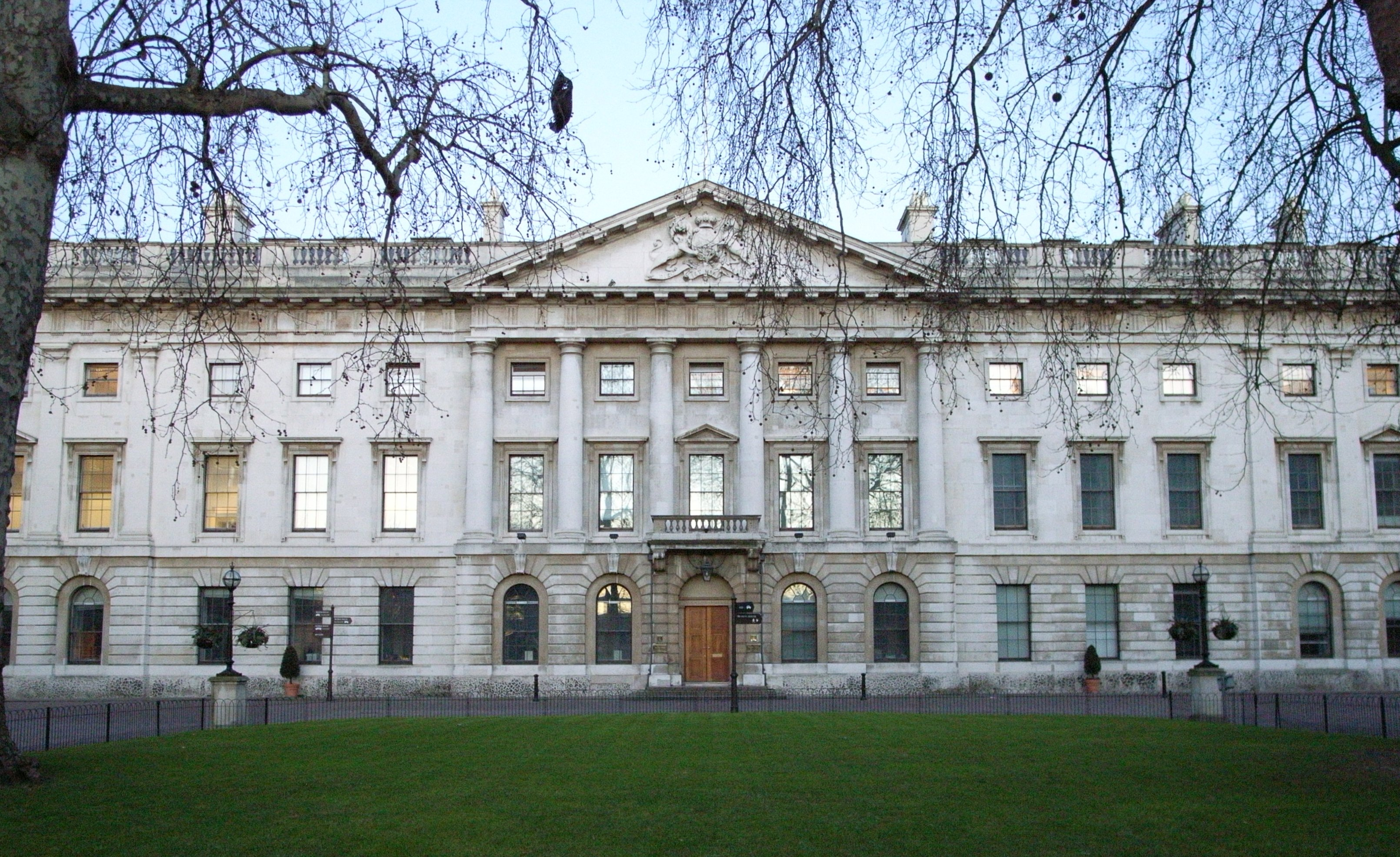
Johnson Smirke Building in 2007

Construction started in 1805 of the new purpose-built mint on Tower Hill, opposite the Tower of London, and it was completed by 1809. In 1812, the move became official: the keys of the old mint were ceremoniously delivered to the Constable of the Tower. Facing the front of the site stood the Johnson Smirke Building, named for its designer James Johnson and builder Robert Smirke. Construction was supervised by the architect John Lidbury Poole (father of the famous singer, Elizabeth Poole). This building was flanked on both sides by gatehouses behind which another building housed the mint's new machinery. Several other smaller buildings were erected, which housed mint officers and staff members. The entire site was protected by a boundary wall patrolled by the Royal Mint's military guard.

By 1856, the mint was beginning to prove inefficient: there were irregularities in minted coins' fineness and weight. Instructed by Prime Minister Lord Palmerston, the Master of the Mint Thomas Graham was informed that unless the mint could raise its standards and become more economical, it would be broken up and placed under management by contractors. Graham sought advice from German chemist August Wilhelm von Hofmann, who in turn recommended his student George Frederick Ansell to resolve the mint's issues. In a letter to the Treasury dated 29 October 1856, Ansell was put forward as a candidate. He was appointed as a temporary clerk on 12 November 1856, with a salary of £120 per year.

Upon taking office, Ansell discovered that the weighing of metals at the mint was extremely loose. At the mint, it had been the custom to weigh silver to the nearest 0.5 troy ounces (16 g) and gold to a pennyweight (0.05 oz); however, these standards meant losses were being made from overvalued metals. In one such case, Ansell delivered 7920.00 oz of gold to the mint, where it was weighed by an official at 7918.15 oz, a difference of 1.85 oz. Requesting a second weighing on a more accurate scale, the bullion was certified to weigh 7919.98 oz, far closer to the previous measurement, which was off by 960 grains. To increase the accuracy of weights, more precise weighing equipment was ordered, and the tolerance was revised to 0.10 oz for silver and 0.01 oz for gold. Between 1856 and 1866, the old scales were gradually removed and replaced with scales made by Messrs. De Grave, Short, and Fanner; winners of an 1862 International Exhibition prize award for work relating to balances.

Ansell also noticed a loss of gold during the manufacturing process. He found that 15 to 20 ounces could be recovered from the sweep, that is, the leftover burnt rubbish from the minting process, which was often left in open boxes for many months before being removed. Wanting to account for every particle and knowing that it was physically impossible for gold just to disappear, he put down the lost weight to a combination of oil, dust, and different types of foreign matter amongst the gold.

In 1859, the Royal Mint rejected a batch of gold found to be too brittle for the minting of gold sovereigns. Analysis revealed the presence of small amounts of antimony, arsenic and lead. With Ansell's background in chemistry, he persuaded the Royal Mint to allow him to experiment with the alloy, and was ultimately able to produce 167,539 gold sovereigns. On a second occasion in 1868, it was again discovered that gold coins, this time totalling £500,000 worth, were being produced with inferior gold. Although the standard practice at the mint was for rejected coins (known as brockages) to be melted down, many entered general circulation, and the mint was forced to return thousands of ounces of gold to the Bank of England. Although Ansell offered to re-melt the substandard coins, his offer was rejected, causing a row between him and senior mint chiefs, which ultimately led to him being removed from his position at the mint.

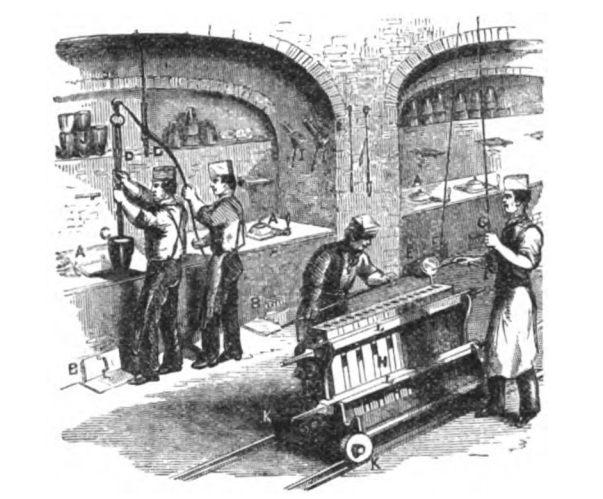
Gold Melting Process (1870)

After the high-level practice as deputy engraver in the Royal Mint, Charles Wiener went then to Lisbon in 1864 as chief engraver to the Mint of Portugal. In 1863 he made a commemorative medal for Prince Albert (1819–1861), consort of Queen Victoria. (Victoria and Albert Museum).

==== Royal Mint Refinery ====
After relocating to its new home on Tower Hill, the Mint came under increased scrutiny of how it dealt with unrefined gold that had entered the country. The Master of the Mint had been responsible for overseeing the practice since the position's inception in the 14th century. However, the refinery process proved too costly and suffered from a lack of accountability from the master. A Royal Commission was set up in 1848 to address these issues; it recommended that the refinery process be outsourced to an external agency, thereby removing the refining process from the mint's responsibilities. The opportunity to oversee the Mint's refinery was taken up by Anthony de Rothschild, a descendant of the Rothschild family and heir to the multinational financial company N M Rothschild & Sons. Rothschild secured a lease from the government in January 1852, purchasing equipment and premises adjacent to the Royal Mint on 19 Royal Mint Street under the name of Royal Mint Refinery.

==== Colonial expansion ====
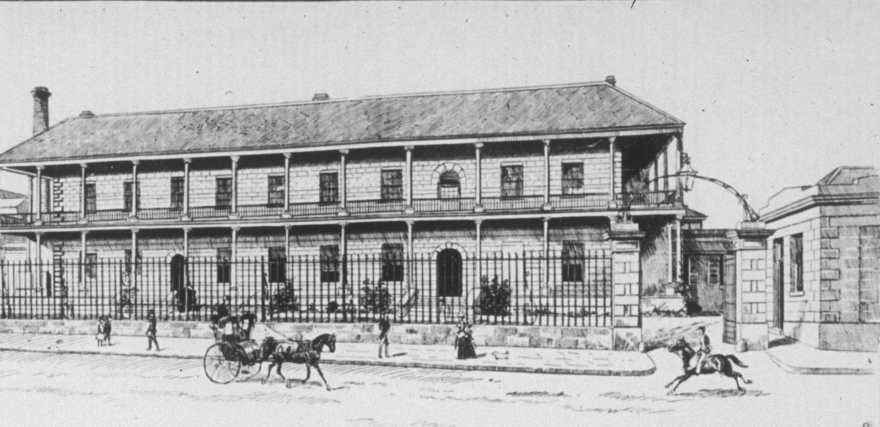
Royal Mint, Sydney in 1888

As Britain's influence as a world power expanded, with colonies being established abroad, a greater need for currency led to the Royal Mint opening satellite branches overseas. This need first arose in the then-Colony of New South Wales, as the black-market trade in gold during and following the 1851 Australian gold rush threatened to undermine the colony's economy. In 1851 the colony's Legislative Council sent Queen Victoria a petition seeking a local mint for Sydney, and in 1853 the Queen issued an Order in Council providing for the establishment of the Sydney Branch of the Royal Mint. The Royal Mint's Superintendent of Coining travelled to Australia to oversee its establishment on Macquarie Street within the southern wing of Sydney Hospital, where it opened in 1855. Production increased quickly: assayer's notes from 29 October 1855 indicate that the mint's Bullion Office had purchased 14,000 troy ounces (440 kg) of unrefined gold in the preceding week alone, and the mint's overall coin output averaged over £1,000,000 yearly in its first five years of operation. In 1868, gold sovereigns minted in Sydney were made legal tender in all British colonies, and in February 1886 they were given equal status in the UK itself.

The success of the Sydney branch led to the opening of similar branches in Melbourne and Perth, on 2 June 1872 and 20 June 1899 respectively. Following the Federation of Australia in 1901 and the establishment of a separate Australian pound in 1910, all three branches were used by the Commonwealth government to mint circulating coins for Australia. The Melbourne and Perth branches had capabilities superior to those in Sydney, and they took over production responsibilities for Australia when the Sydney branch closed after 72 years of operation at the end of 1926. Following the establishment of the Royal Australian Mint as a central mint for Australian coinage, the Melbourne and Perth mints were divested by the Royal Mint on 1 July 1970.

In Canada, which had been under British rule since 1763, British coins circulated alongside those of other nations until 1858, when London started producing coins for the newly established Canadian dollar. As Canada developed in 1890, calls were made for a mint to be built in Ottawa to facilitate the country's gold mines. The new mint was opened on 2 January 1908 by Lord Grey, producing coins for circulation, including Ottawa Mint sovereigns. In 1931, under the Statute of Westminster, the mint came under the control of the Government of Canada and was subsequently renamed the Royal Canadian Mint.

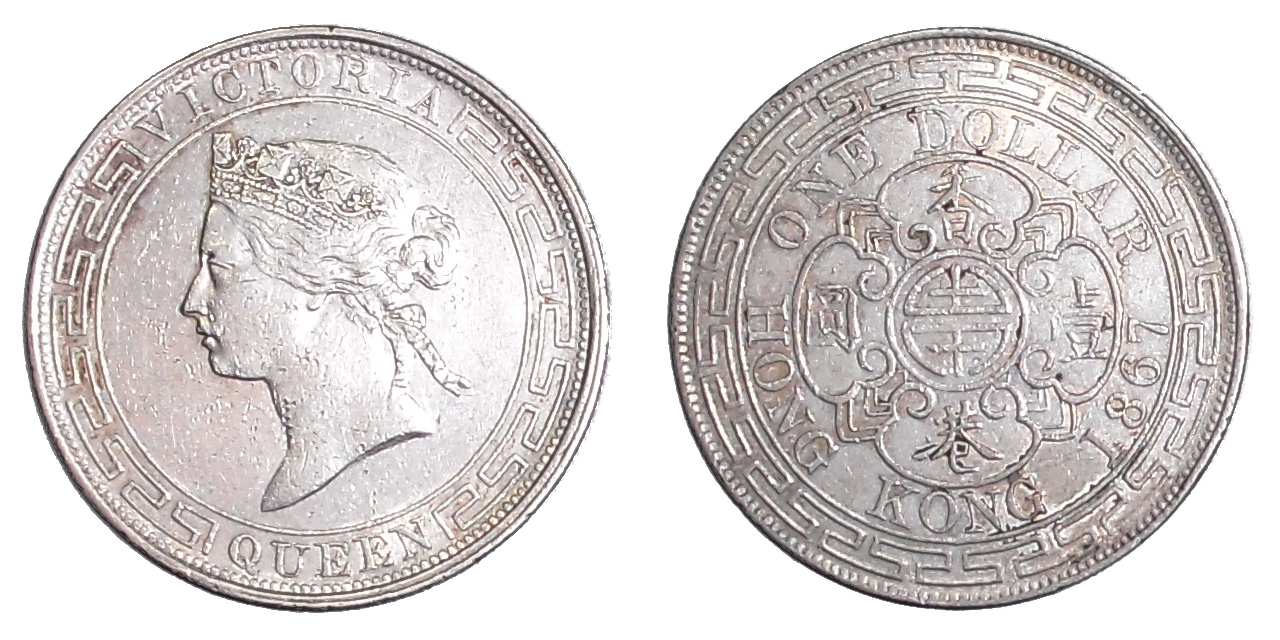
Hong Kong silver dollar (1867)

A fifth branch of the Royal Mint was established in Mumbai (Bombay), India on 21 December 1917 as part of a wartime effort. It struck sovereigns from 15 August 1918 until 22 April 1919 but closed in May 1919. A sixth and final overseas mint was established in the Union of South Africa in Pretoria on 1 January 1923, producing £83,114,575 worth of sovereigns in its lifetime. As South Africa began cutting ties with Britain, the mint closed on 30 June 1941 but was later reopened as the South African Mint.

Although London's Royal Mint officially controlled just six mints, many more independent mints were set up in parts of the British Empire. At New Westminster in British Columbia, the British Columbia gold rushes led to a mint being established in 1862 by Francis George Claudet, under Governor James Douglas. It produced a few gold and silver coins before being shut down in 1862 to aid the city of Victoria in becoming the region's provincial capital. On 26 February 1864, an Order in Council requested the founding of an independent mint (Hong Kong Mint) in British Hong Kong to issue silver and bronze coins. But this mint was short-lived, due to its coins being heavily debased, causing significant losses. The site was sold to Jardine Matheson in 1868, and the mint machinery was sold to the Japanese Mint in Osaka.

=== 1914 to 1966 ===
In 1914, as war broke out in Europe, Chancellor of the Exchequer David Lloyd George instructed that gold coins be removed from circulation to help pay for the war effort. The government started to issue £1 and 10-shilling Treasury notes as replacements, paving the way for Britain to leave the gold standard in 1931. The Bombay Mint sovereign was the £1 coin.

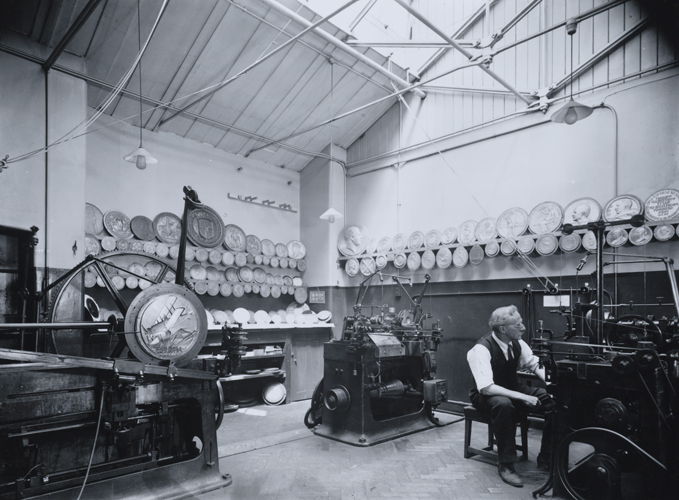
Engraving room at the Royal Mint in 1934

From 1928, the Irish Free State (later the Republic of Ireland) issued its own coins. The Royal Mint produced these until Ireland established its own Currency Centre in Dublin in 1978.

During World War II, the Mint was important in ensuring people were paid for their services with hard currency rather than banknotes. Under Operation Bernhard, the Nazis planned to collapse the British economy by flooding the country with forged notes, leading the Bank of England to stop issuing banknotes of £10 and above. To meet these demands, the Mint doubled its output so that by 1943 it was minting around 700 million coins a year despite the constant threat of being bombed. The Deputy Master of the Mint, John Craig, recognised the dangers to the Mint and introduced several measures to ensure the Mint could continue to operate in the event of a disaster. Craig added emergency water supplies, reinforced the Mint's basement to act as an air-raid shelter and even accepted employment of women for the first time. For most of the war, the mint managed to escape most of the destruction of the Blitz, but in December 1940 three members of staff were killed in an air raid. Around the same time, an auxiliary mint was set up at Pinewood Studios, Buckinghamshire, which had been requisitioned for the war effort. Staff and machinery from Tower Hill were moved to the site, which started production in June 1941 and operated for the duration of the war. Over the course of the war, the Royal Mint was hit on several occasions, and at one point was put out of commission for three weeks. As technology changed with the introduction of electricity and demand continued to grow, the rebuilding process continued so that by the 1960s, little of the original mint remained, apart from Smirke's 1809 building and its gatehouses at the front.

=== Since 1966 ===
==== Relocation to Wales ====
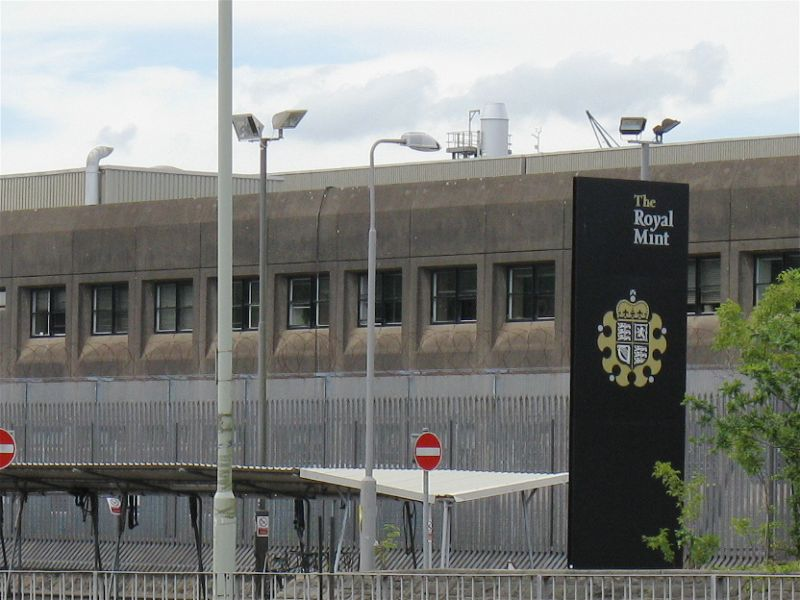
Royal Mint in Llantrisant

On 1 March 1966, the government announced plans to decimalise the nation's currency, thereby requiring the withdrawal of millions of coins and the re-minting of new ones. At its current site on Tower Hill, the mint had suffered from lack of space for many years, and it would be inadequate to meet the anticipated high demand a recoinage would entail. A possible move to a more suitable site had been discussed as far back as 1870, when Deputy Master of the Mint Charles Fremantle had recommended it in his first annual report. At the time, it had been suggested that the valuable land at Tower Hill could be sold to finance the purchase of land at nearby Whitefriars and pay for a new mint building. However, after many years of subsequent debate in Parliament it had been decided that improvements could be made to the existing site at Tower Hill. With Decimal Day set for 1971, the government quickly decided where to establish the new mint.

Over twenty sites were considered including suggestions for Scotland and Northern Ireland; however, the small Welsh town of Llantrisant, ten miles (16 km) northwest of Cardiff, was eventually chosen. Work on the new mint began in August 1967 with the construction of a blank treatment plant and a plant for striking. This first phase of the mint was formally opened on 17 December 1968 in the presence of Queen Elizabeth II, Prince Philip, and Prince Charles. There had been fears that the Royal Family would face protests because some Welsh people were unhappy about the Investiture of Prince Charles as Prince of Wales; however, no such protests materialised. The second phase of construction began in 1973 and included the addition of a means to mint coins from raw metals; thus completing the full minting process. Upon completion the final cost for the land, buildings and plant came to £8 million. Coin minting gradually shifted to the new site over the next seven years, and the last coin, a gold sovereign, was struck in London in November 1975.

==== Financial difficulties ====
Royal Mint logo before becoming a government-owned company

After moving to Wales, the mint struggled to be profitable as the Western world fell into a deep recession during the early 1970s. To combat a rising national debt, the mint was established as a trading fund on 1 April 1975, which required it to become self-financing. This measure proved successful, and the mint became more profitable through heavy exports. In April 1990, the mint became an Executive Agency; however, by 2001, the mint had reported its first annual loss: a result attributed to only securing 5% of new euro coin production rather than the projected 20%. Despite this, the mint began diversifying its product range by offering items outside its usual coin-related merchandise. Around this time, the mint was selling different types of jewellery, commemorative plates and figurines, eventually creating its own Royal Mint Classics range of collectible goods. This part of the business proved popular in attracting new customers, but it suffered from poor product development. Its products included a hip flask with an embedded £2 coin, an Edinburgh Crystal clock combined with a millennium Crown, and a Wedgwood plate featuring Britannia. In 2007, the Mint decided to resume its focus on coins, downsizing non-coin related business and discontinuing its Classics range.

The 2008 financial crisis was another financial blow: a rescue package costing £500 billion was announced to help stabilise Britain's banking system. This led to fears that the government would attempt to finance the cost by selling off state-owned organisations. In his 2009 pre-budget report, the Chancellor of the Exchequer Alistair Darling stated that the Treasury would "explore the potential benefits of alternative future models for the Royal Mint". A month later in his 2009 United Kingdom budget, he recommended that the mint be made a company with a view to it being sold.

The recommendation was met with outrage by unions and opposition parties in parliament, who called it the "selling off the family silver" and said it would result in job losses. In contrast, the chief executive of the mint, Andrew Stafford, welcomed the proposal, saying that it would lead to further growth and secure the future of the business.

On 31 December 2009, rather than being fully privatised, the mint ceased to be an executive agency and its assets were vested in a limited company, Royal Mint Ltd. The owner of the new company became The Royal Mint trading fund, which itself continued to be owned by HM Treasury. As its sole shareholder, the mint pays an annual dividend of £4 million to the Treasury, with the remaining profits being reinvested into the mint. In 2015, Chancellor of the Exchequer George Osborne announced a £20 billion privatisation drive to raise funds, with the Royal Mint being up for sale alongside other institutions including the Met Office and Companies House.

In the 21st century cash was becoming less commonly used, with no coins minted, for the first time, in 2024, and the Mint was seeking new sources of revenue such as its "886" jewellery line.

2012 London Olympics

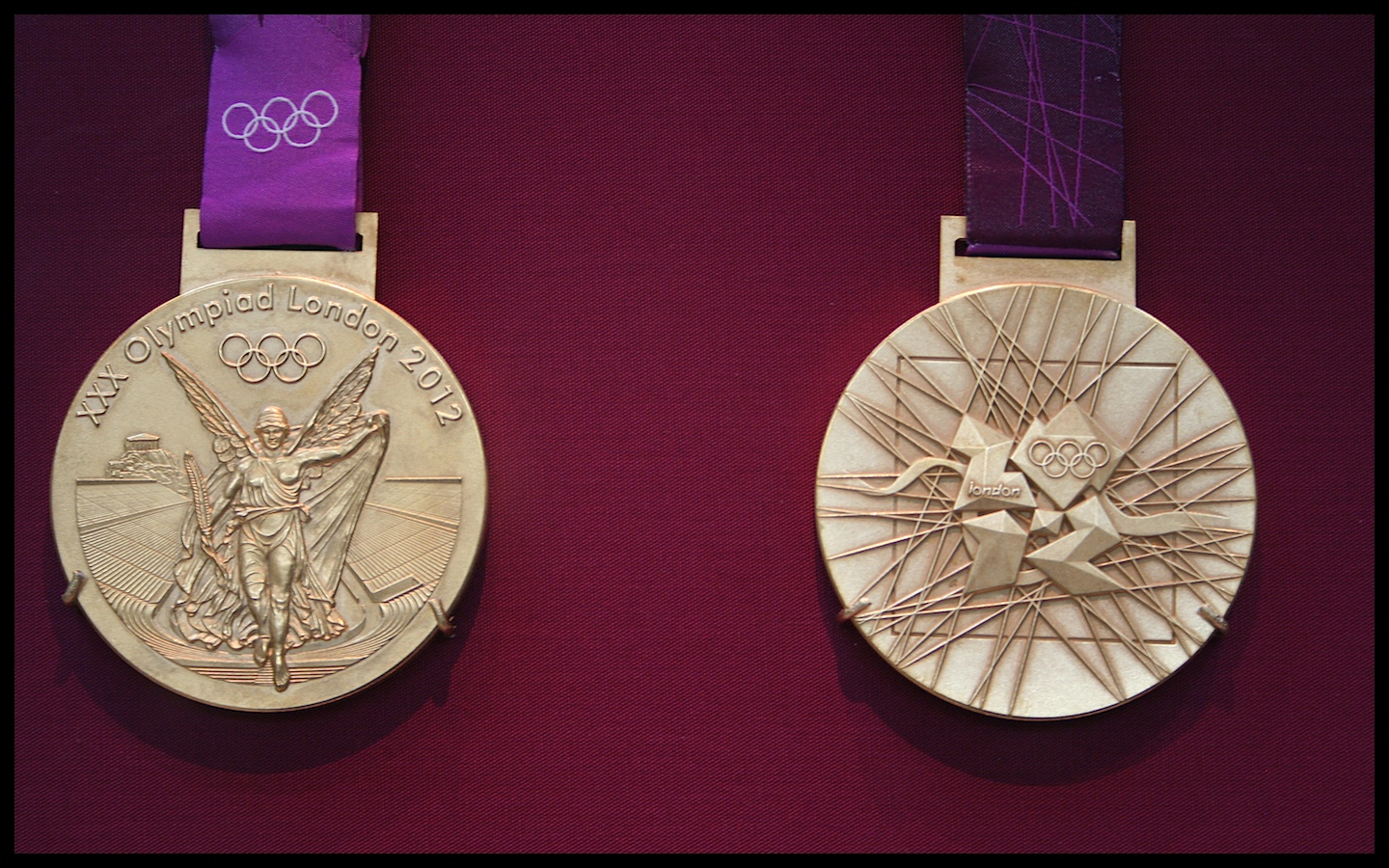
2012 Olympic Medal made by the Mint

After London was selected to host the 2012 Summer Olympics, the Royal Mint put in a successful bid to manufacture the Games' Olympic and Paralympic medals. 4,700 gold, silver and bronze medals were produced by the Mint; each medal was struck 15 times with 900 tonnes of force.

2012 Olympic medal specifications
Medal	Gold	Silver	Bronze
Weight	412 g	412 g	357 g
Composition	1.34% gold 93% silver 6% copper	93% silver 7% copper	97% copper 2.5% zinc 0.5% tin

In addition to securing the medal product contract, the Mint held a competition to design a series of commemorative 50p coins that would enter general circulation before the event. The Mint received over 30,000 entries, with a further 17,000 from a children's competition on the television programme Blue Peter. In all, a total of 29 designs featuring a sport were selected by the Mint; the youngest designer was just 9 years old. A £2 coin commemorating London's handover to Rio de Janeiro was also released in 2012.

The Royal Mint Experience

In April 2014, the Mint announced plans to develop a visitor centre in Llantrisant, where members of the public could go on a guided tour of the facility and learn about the mint's history. The development contract, estimated to be worth £7.7 million, was awarded to construction firm ISG and design consultant Mather & Co., who had previously designed the Norwegian Olympic Museum, as well as a handful of visitor attractions for sports clubs including Chelsea F.C., Manchester City F.C., FC Porto, and the Springboks. To fund the development, a grant of £2.3 million was provided by the Welsh Government towards the attraction which aimed to attract 200,000 visitors a year to the area. By May 2016, two years after its announcement, the attraction, designed by Rio Architects and now named Royal Mint Experience, opened to the public at a final cost of £9 million. The visitor centre includes an interactive museum, a view of the factory floor, an education centre, and a press where visitors can strike their own souvenir 50 pence coin. On display at the centre are more than 80,000 artefacts, including Olympic medals, a pattern coin of Edward VIII, a Janvier reducing machine and a selection of trial plates.

=== Since 2014 ===
In the same month, the mint took in 48 tonnes of silver recovered from the shipwreck of the SS Gairsoppa (torpedoed in 1941), which was used to produce limited edition coins.

In 2015, after nearly 50 years, the mint began producing its own line of bullion bars and coins under its revived Royal Mint Refinery brand. Then in 2016, the mint announced plans for Royal Mint Gold (RMG), a digital gold currency that uses blockchain to trade and invest in gold. However, this project was cancelled in 2018.

The Royal Mint, in February 2020, listed its first financial product: the Royal Mint Physical Gold Commodity Exchange-traded fund (ETF): RMAU. It is listed on the London Stock Exchange and Deutsche Börse. RMAU is the first gold ETF backed 100% by the London Bullion Market Association responsible sourcing programme. Investors can also convert RMAU into coins and gold bars. The Royal Mint partnered with white label ETF firm HANetf.

==== Jewellery line ====
The Mint, seeking to diversify, launched a line of sustainable luxury hand-made jewellery, 886 by The Royal Mint, in 2022, selling online and from a shop in London's Burlington Arcade. The collection uses gold recovered from electronic waste and other recycled sources. In 2024, it was expecting to become profitable the following year.

== Operations ==
=== Coin production ===
As the sole body responsible for minting legal tender coins in the United Kingdom under contract from HM Treasury, the mint produces all of the country's physical coinage; banknotes are printed by the Bank of England. On average, it strikes two billion sterling coins for general circulation every year, with an estimated 28 billion coins circulating altogether. Outside the UK, historically, the mint has provided services to over 60 countries, including New Zealand and many Caribbean nations, by minting national currencies or supplying ready-to-strike planchets. In 2015, it was estimated that 2.4 billion coins were minted for overseas countries, exceeding domestic coinage production and providing over 60% of the mint's revenue from circulating currencies.

=== Precious Metals Recovery Facility ===
Declining cash use has been a catalyst for change at The Royal Mint, spurring innovation and a portfolio of new businesses. In 2024, The Royal Mint unveiled its new Precious Metals Recovery facility at its site in south Wales. The 3,700 square metre facility provides a more sustainable source of gold to the business, reducing its reliance on mining. It uses world-first patented chemistry from Canadian clean tech company Excir, extracting gold from printed circuit boards (PCBs) found in everyday electronic items such as TVs, laptops and mobile phones in minutes. Excir's chemistry works at room temperature, enabling energy- and cost-effective gold recovery.

=== Commemorative coins ===
The Mint also regularly produces commemorative coins for the collectors' market, with a range of varying quality and made of different precious metals.

Coins minted (billions)
	2015	2014	2013
United Kingdom	2.007	2.384	1.996
International	2.4	2.2	2.0

=== Bullion ===
Royal Mint Refinery Seal

Another important operation of the mint, which contributes half the mint's revenue, is the sale of bullion to investors and the general public in the form of bars and coins. Historically, the mint refined its own metal; but following the advice of an 1848 Royal Commission, the process was separated, with the independent Royal Mint Refinery being purchased and operated by Anthony de Rothschild in 1852. The Rothschild family continued the refinery's management until it was sold to Engelhard in 1967. A year later, the Royal Mint relocated to Wales and ceased its bullion bar interests, but the brand was revived in 2015. Bullion bars produced by the mint are stamped with the original Royal Mint Refinery emblem and come in a range of sizes.

Bullion bars
Metal	Fineness	Weights						
Silver	999					100 g	500 g	1 kg
Gold	999.9	1 g	5 g	10 g	1 oz tr	100 g	500 g	1 kg
Platinum	999.5				1 oz tr	100 g	500 g	1 kg

Minting of bullion coins began in 1957 to meet a demand for authentic sovereign coins, which suffered from heavy counterfeiting. Coins were released almost every year alongside proof versions up to 1982 when production of uncirculated sovereigns was discontinued, though proof examples continued to be minted. In 1987, the mint started to produce a new type of bullion coin: the gold one-ounce Britannia coin with a face value of £100. A silver version valued at £2 was also released in 1997. Production of the previously discontinued uncirculated sovereigns and half sovereigns resumed in 2000. From 2014, a lunar coin series was minted annually in celebration of the Lunar New Year; and in 2016, a series featuring The Queen's Beasts began.

Bullion coins
	Type	Face value	Diameter	Weight	Fineness	Ref.
Britannia	1 oz tr silver	£2	38.61 mm	31.21 g	999	
Britannia	1 oz tr gold	£100	32.69 mm	31.21 g	999.9	
Sovereign	Sovereign	£1	22.05 mm	7.988 g	916	
Queen's Beasts	2 oz tr silver	£5	38.61 mm	62.42 g	999	
Queen's Beasts	1 oz tr gold	£100	32.69 mm	31.21 g	999.9	
Queen's Beasts	1 oz tr platinum	£100	32.69 mm	31.21 g	999.5	
Lunar Series	1 oz tr silver	£2	38.61 mm	31.21 g	999	
Lunar Series	1 oz tr gold	£100	32.69 mm	31.21 g	999.9	
Landmarks of Britain	1 oz tr silver	£2	38.61 mm	31.21 g	999	

=== Medals ===
On occasion, the mint produces medals for government departments and under private contracts for clients such as royal societies, colleges, and universities. Most notably, the mint has made OBE medals as well as many military honours, including the Defence Medal and the Conspicuous Gallantry Cross for the British Armed Forces. For the 2012 Summer Olympics, the mint won a contract to produce 4,700 gold, silver and bronze medals for competitors.

Before 1851, the making of medals at the mint was at the discretion of engravers who could undertake the work independently and receive an additional wage. A royal patent issued in 1669 granted the mint the sole right to produce medals of any metal that bore a monarch's portrait. Engravers would use the facilities at the mint to make commemorative medals of their own design for sale. A key date in the mint's history of producing medals for the military is 1815, when the Battle of Waterloo marked the beginning of awarding military campaign medals. By 1874, the mint was responsible for making all bars and clasps for war medals in the country and was making campaign medals such as the New Zealand War Service Medal, the Abyssinian War Medal, and the Ashantee Medal.

At the start of the First World War, military medals were manufactured by the Woolwich Arsenal and private contractors. However, in 1922, a new medal unit created by the mint became the sole manufacturer of all Royal and State medals and decorations in metal, except the Victoria Cross, which is made by Hancocks & Co. Before 2010, all British military medals were made by the mint; however, they now must compete with other manufacturers.

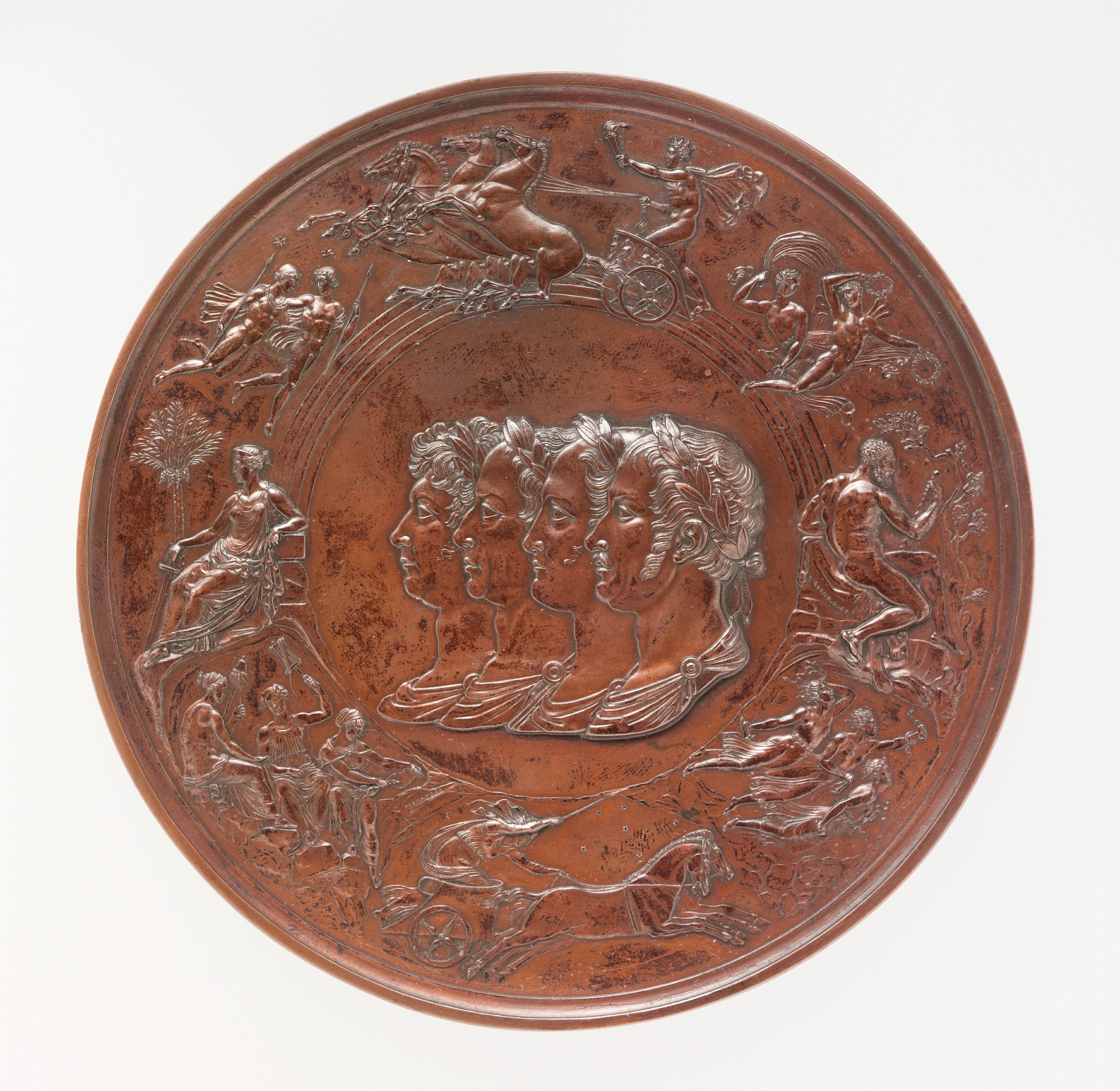
Waterloo Medal (1849)

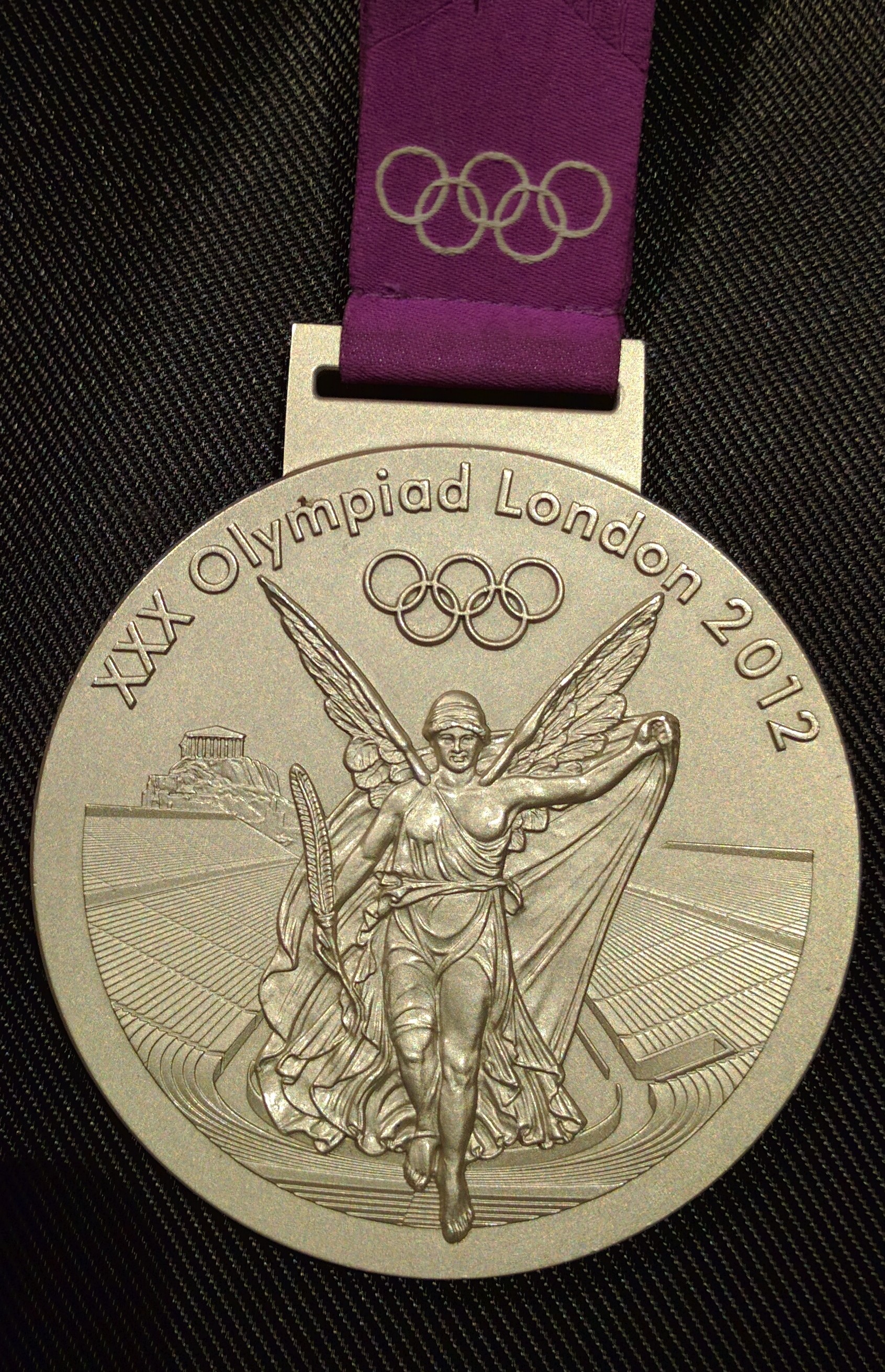
2012 Summer Olympics

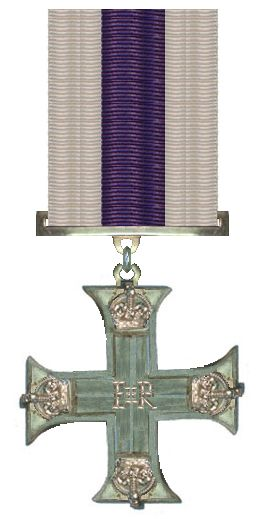
Military Cross

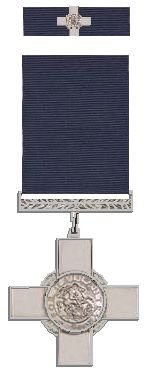
George Cross

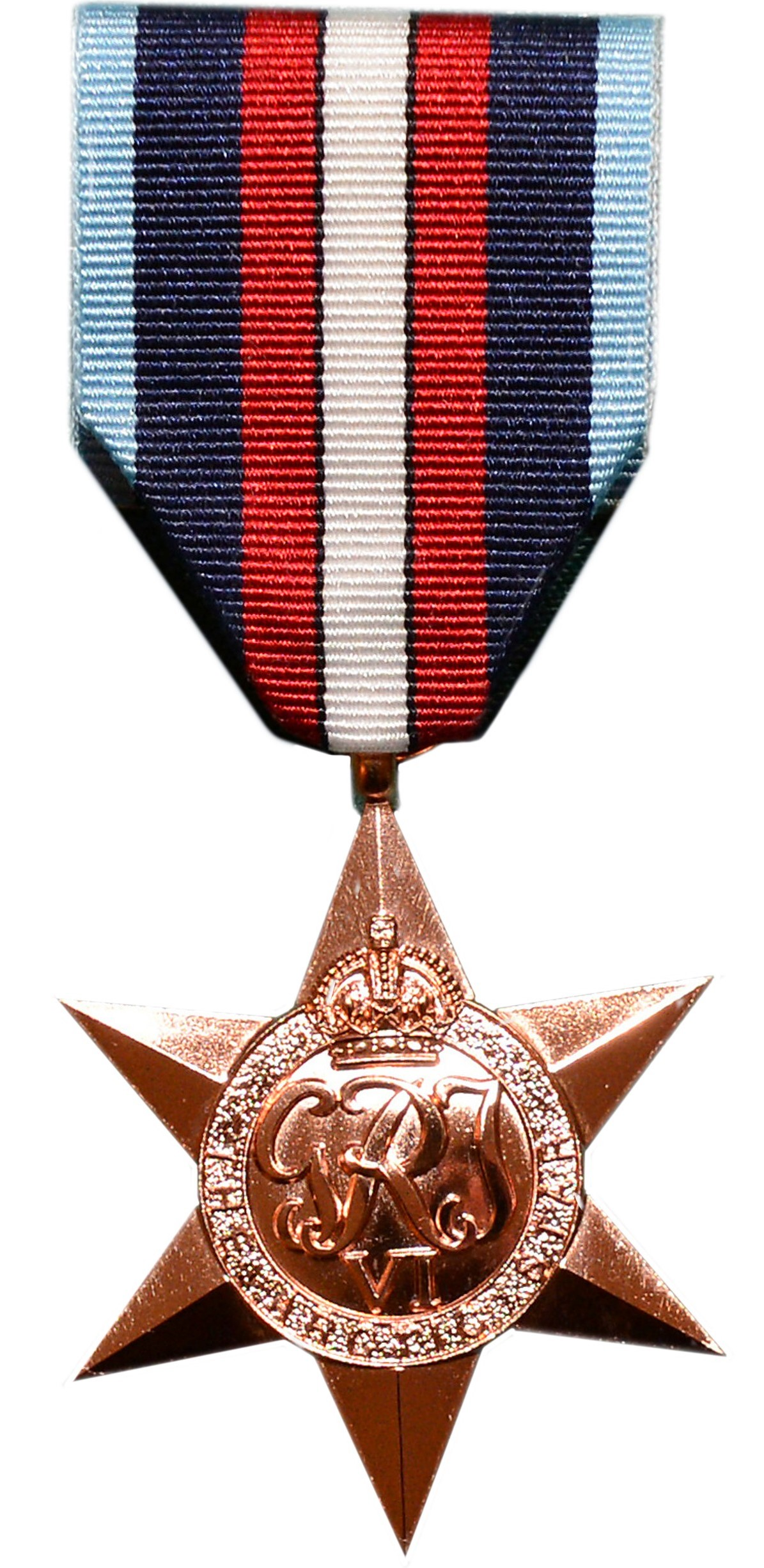
Arctic Star

=== Royal Mint Advisory Committee ===
The Royal Mint Advisory Committee on the Design of Coins, Medals, Seals and Decorations (RMAC) is an advisory non-departmental public body of HM Treasury. It reviews proposed designs for United Kingdom coins, official medals, seals and decorations, and provides recommendations to the government and the monarch. The committee was established in 1922 with the approval of George V, to "raise the standard of numismatic and medallic art in Britain and is expected to ensure that designs meet high standards of art, decency and good taste."

== Trial of the Pyx ==
The Trial of the Pyx is a traditional procedure to test newly minted coins for conformity to required standards. The trials have been held since the 12th century, normally once per calendar year. The form of the ceremony has been essentially the same since 1282. They are trials in the full judicial sense, presided over by a judge with an expert jury of assayers. The trials have since 1871 taken place at the livery hall of the Worshipful Company of Goldsmiths, having previously taken place at the Palace of Westminster. Given modern production methods, it is unlikely that coins would not conform, although this has been a problem in the past as it would have been tempting for the Master of the Mint or others to steal precious metals.

The term "pyx" refers to the boxwood chest (Greek: πυξίς, romanized: pyxís) in which coins were placed for presentation to the jury. There is also a Pyx Chapel (or Pyx Chamber) in Westminster Abbey which was once used for secure storage of the Pyx and related articles.

Coins to be tested are drawn from the regular production of the Royal Mint. The Deputy Master of the Mint must, throughout the year, randomly select a fixed proportion of the coins produced and set the samples aside for the trial. For example, for every 5,000 bimetallic coins issued one must be set aside, but for silver Maundy money the proportion is one in 150.

The trial today consists of an inquiry independent of the Royal Mint.

The jury is composed of freemen of the Company of Goldsmiths, who assay the coins provided to decide whether they have been minted within the criteria determined by the relevant Coinage Acts.

== Arms ==
Coat of arms of Royal Mint
Notes Drafted c. 1561–62 and granted 23 April 1982 Escutcheon Argent on a cross between in chief two fleur-de-lys Azure and in base two towers embattled of four merlons Sable a bezant between in pale two stags heads erased Or langued Gules and in fess two bulls heads erased Argent armed Or and langued Gules, on a chief Gules between two crosses crosslet fitchy Argent a lion passant guardant Or armed and langued Azure.

== See also ==
- Banknotes of the pound sterling
- Bullion
- Bullion coin
- Coins of the pound sterling
- Inflation hedge
- Joseph Harris (British astronomer)
- Kevin Clancy
- List of British banknotes and coins
- List of mints
- Mints of Scotland
- The Supremacy Medallion of Henry VIII
- William John Hocking

== Bibliography ==
- Allen, Larry (2009). The Encyclopedia of Money. ABC-CLIO. ISBN 978-1598842517.
- Ansell, George Frederick (1870). The Royal Mint: its working, conduct, and operations... London: Effingham Wilson, Royal Exchange.
- Beardon, James (2013). The Spellmount Guide to London in the Second World War. Spellmount. p. 177.
- Challis, C.E. (1992). A New History of the Royal Mint. Cambridge University Press.
- Craig, John (2011). The Mint: A History of the London Mint from A.D. 287 to 1948. Cambridge University Press.
- Davis, Glyn (2010). A History of Money From Ancient Times to the Present Day. University of Wales Press. ISBN 978-0708317174.
- Dyer, G.P. (1986). The Royal Mint : An Illustrated History. Royal Mint. ISBN 9781869917012.
- Hainsworth, Gavin (2005). New Westminster Album: Glimpses of the City as It Was. Dundurn Group Ltd. p. 148. ISBN 978-1550025484.
- Ingham, Michael (2007). Hong Kong: A Cultural History. Oxford University Press. p. 70. ISBN 978-0-19-972447-5.
- Linecar, Howard (1985). Coins and Coin Collecting. Littlehampton Book Services Ltd. ISBN 9780600500872.
- Michael, Thomas (2016). 2017 Standard Catalog of World Coins, 1901-2000. Krause Publications. ISBN 978-1440246548.
- Vince, Alan (2001). "London". In Lapidge, Michael; Blair, John; Keynes, Simon; Scragg, Donald (eds.). The Blackwell Encyclopedia of Anglo-Saxon England. Blackwell. ISBN 978-0-631-22492-1.
