= The Supremacy Medallion of Henry VIII =

The Supremacy Medallion, also known as the Supremacy Medal, is a rare gold medallion issued in 1545 during the reign of King Henry VIII of England. It commemorates Henry's assertion as Supreme Head of the Church of England, following the Act of Supremacy in 1534. The medal is one of the earliest known examples of English commemorative medals and a significant artefact of Tudor propaganda and Renaissance design.

== Historical background ==
The Act of Supremacy (1534) marked a major turning point in English religious history, declaring Henry VIII the Supreme Head of the Church of England. This break from papal authority initiated the English Reformation. The medallion was produced more than a decade later, symbolising Henry's consolidated power over both church and state.

== Design ==
The Supremacy Medallion is widely regarded as England's first Renaissance-style commemorative medal. It was likely designed by Henry Bayse, the chief engraver at the Royal Mint. The medallion, measuring approximately 51 mm in diameter and weighing around 60 grams, was struck in gold. It is attributed to the engraver R. H., likely working under royal commission at the Tower Mint in London.

=== Obverse ===
Features a bust of Henry VIII facing right, wearing an ermine-trimmed robe, a bejewelled cap, and a collar of rubies. Around him is a Latin inscription:

"HENRICVS OCTA ANGLIAE FRANCI ET HIB REX FIDEI DEFENSOR ET IN TERR ECCLE ANGLI ET HIBE SUB CHRIST CAPVT SVPREMVN" ("Henry VIII, King of England, France and Ireland, Defender of the Faith, and under Christ the supreme head on earth of the Church of England and Ireland").

=== Reverse ===
Contains inscriptions in Hebrew and Greek, repeating the same declaration of supremacy as the obverse. The placement of the languages symbolises Henry's claim to universal Christian authority, over both Old and New Testament traditions. It is also marked "LONDINI 1545" at the bottom.

== Surviving examples and value ==
Only a few examples of the Supremacy Medallion survive today. The British Museum and Royal Museums Greenwich each hold versions in their collections. Another is in the private collection of Christopher Moran at Crosby Hall in London.

In 2021, a gold example was sold at auction in Switzerland for over £100,000, underscoring its rarity and historical value.

== Legacy ==
The medallion is considered one of the earliest examples of Tudor numismatic art and a potent symbol of the Reformation. Its unique use of multiple languages and bold declaration of monarchical authority reflect the ideological and theological shifts of 16th-century England.

== See also ==
- Act of Supremacy (1534) – The legislation that declared Henry VIII the Supreme Head of the Church of England.
- English Reformation – The broader religious and political movement that separated the Church of England from papal authority.
- Tudor propaganda – The use of imagery, coins, medallions, and architecture to promote royal authority during the Tudor period.
- Henry VIII of England – The monarch who initiated the English Reformation and commissioned the Supremacy Medallion.
- Royal Mint – The institution responsible for striking coins and medals in England, including those from the Tudor era.
- Tudor art – The visual and material culture of England during the reign of the Tudor monarchs.
- Medallic art – The art form encompassing the design and production of commemorative medals.
