= The Royal Mint Advisory Committee on the Design of Coins, Medals, Seals and Decorations =

The Royal Mint Advisory Committee (RMAC) is an advisory non-departmental public body of HM Treasury that advises on the design of United Kingdom coins, medals, seals and decorations. It aims to maintain a high standard of numismatic and medallic art and recommends designs to the chancellor of the exchequer and sovereign.

== History ==
RMAC was established in 1922 with the approval of King George V to improve the artistic quality of British coinage and official medals. It is classed as an Advisory Non-Departmental Public Body (Lower Tier).

The committee’s advisory role has periodically attracted public attention when proposed designs or subjects have been reconsidered or abandoned following concerns about the suitability of potential honourees.

== Role ==
RMAC considers proposed designs for circulating and commemorative coins and advises government departments on official medals, seals and decorations. Members of the Royal Mint Advisory Committee are appointed by sovereign of the United Kingdom following the recommendations from the Prime Minister and the Economic Secretary to the Treasury. The committee is sponsored by HM Treasury and appointments are regulated but he Commissioner of Public Appointments.

== Membership ==
The committee is composed of specialists in fields including sculpture, design, heraldry, typography and numismatics. Committee members are unpaid but 'may claim reasonable expenses'. Appointments are required to be made apolitically and any appointees’ political activity (if declared) must be made public.

Appointments and reappointments are announced by HM Treasury; in November 2025, five new members were appointed to five-year terms commencing on 20 November 2025.

== Notable decisions ==
RMAC’s recommendations have shaped many modern British coin designs. Some proposed commemorative issues have generated controversy. In 2020, it was reported that plans for a commemorative coin marking the centenary of Roald Dahl’s birth were abandoned following concerns about the author’s antisemitic views.

== Archives ==
Committee papers, including minutes and correspondence, are held in public and institutional archives including the National Archives at Kew Gardens, digital records are also available on the Royal Mint Museum's Website. Governance documents, including triennial reviews, have been published by HM Treasury.

== See also ==
- The Royal Mint
- Numismatics
- Coins of the pound sterling
