= Landmarks of Britain =

Coins produced by the Royal Mint in the UK

- United Kingdom
- Value: 2 pounds sterling
- Mass: 31.21 g
- Diameter: 38.61 mm
- Edge: Milled
- Composition: .999 fine silver
- Years of minting: 2016

Obverse
- Design: Queen Elizabeth II
- Designer: Jody Clark

Reverse
- Design: Big Ben
- Designer: Glyn Davies and Laura Clancy
- Design date: 2015

Landmarks of Britain is a series of silver bullion coins produced by the Royal Mint in the United Kingdom. The first coin was released in 2017 and features a design of Big Ben previously used on a £100 coin released in 2015. The second and third coins, both released in 2018, feature Tower Bridge and Trafalgar Square. The next coin is expected to portray Buckingham Palace. The coin has a maximum mintage of 50,000. The same designs appeared on a four coin proof set in 2014, these had trichromatic colour-printing and had a mintage of only 3,500 sets.
