= Medal =

Small commemorative artistic object

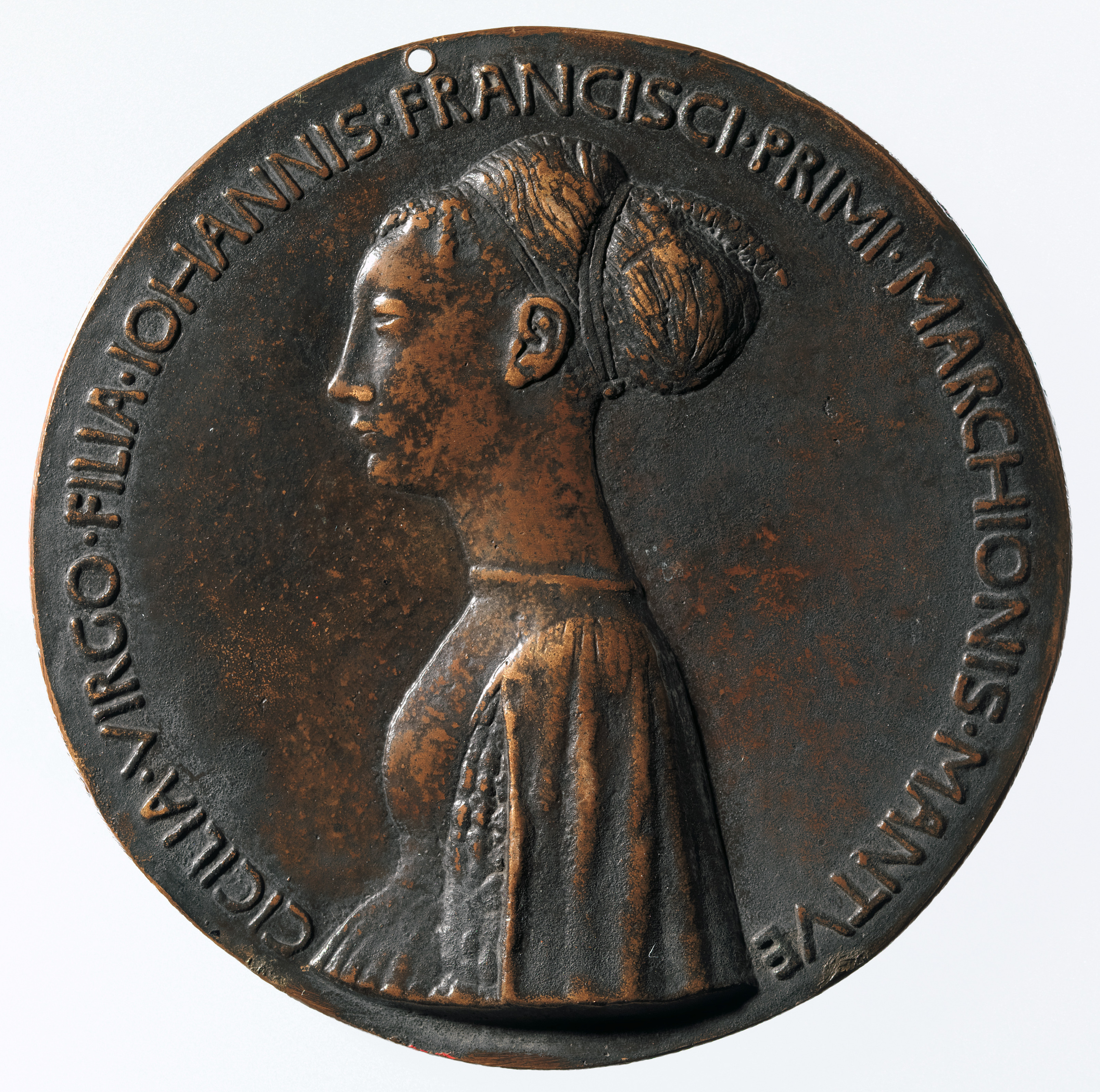
Obverse of medal distributed by Cecilia Gonzaga's family to political allies, a common practice in Renaissance Europe. Designed by Pisanello in 1448.

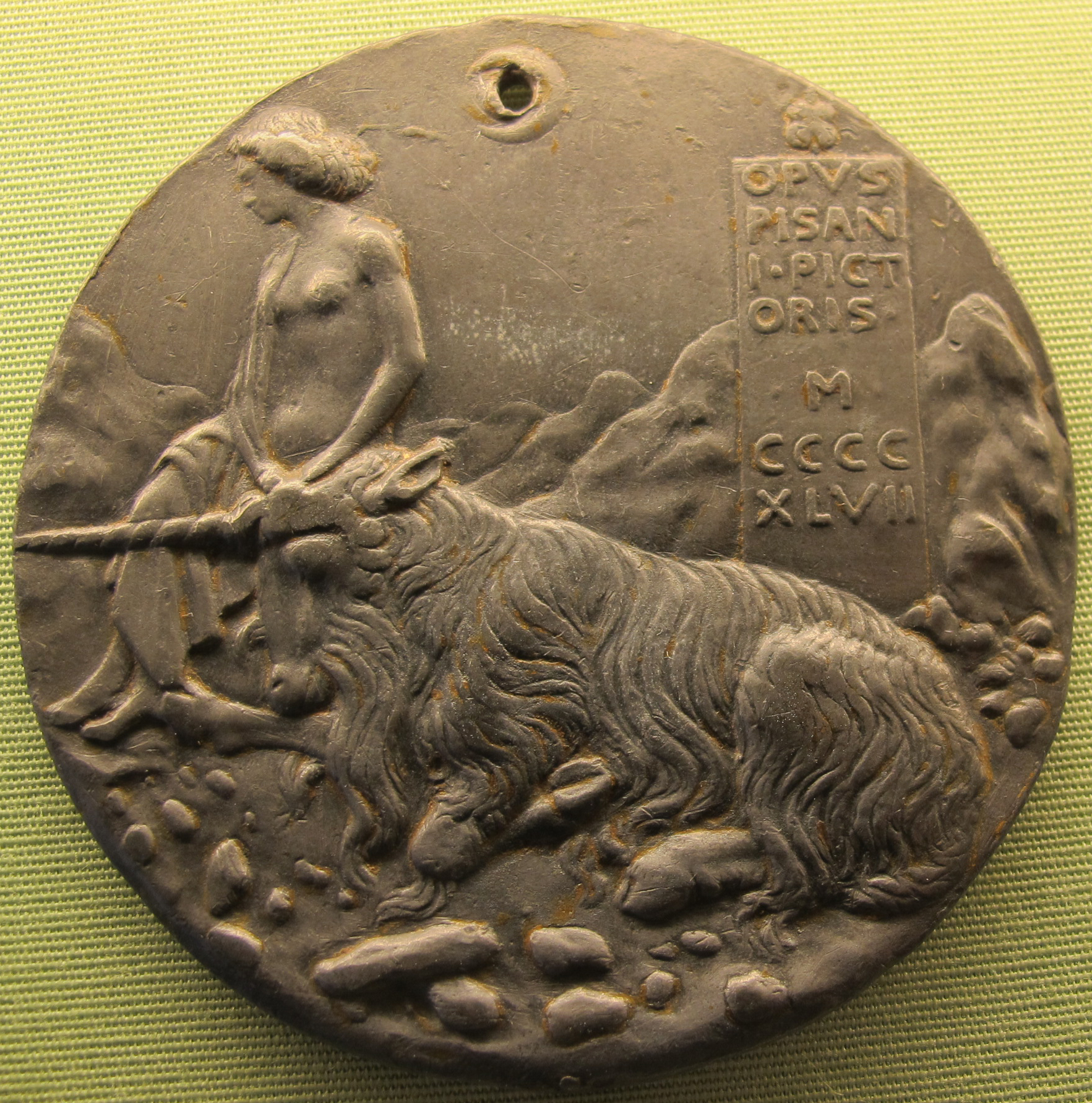
Reverse of the same medal, this copy with a suspension hole added later (inside a crescent moon in the design).

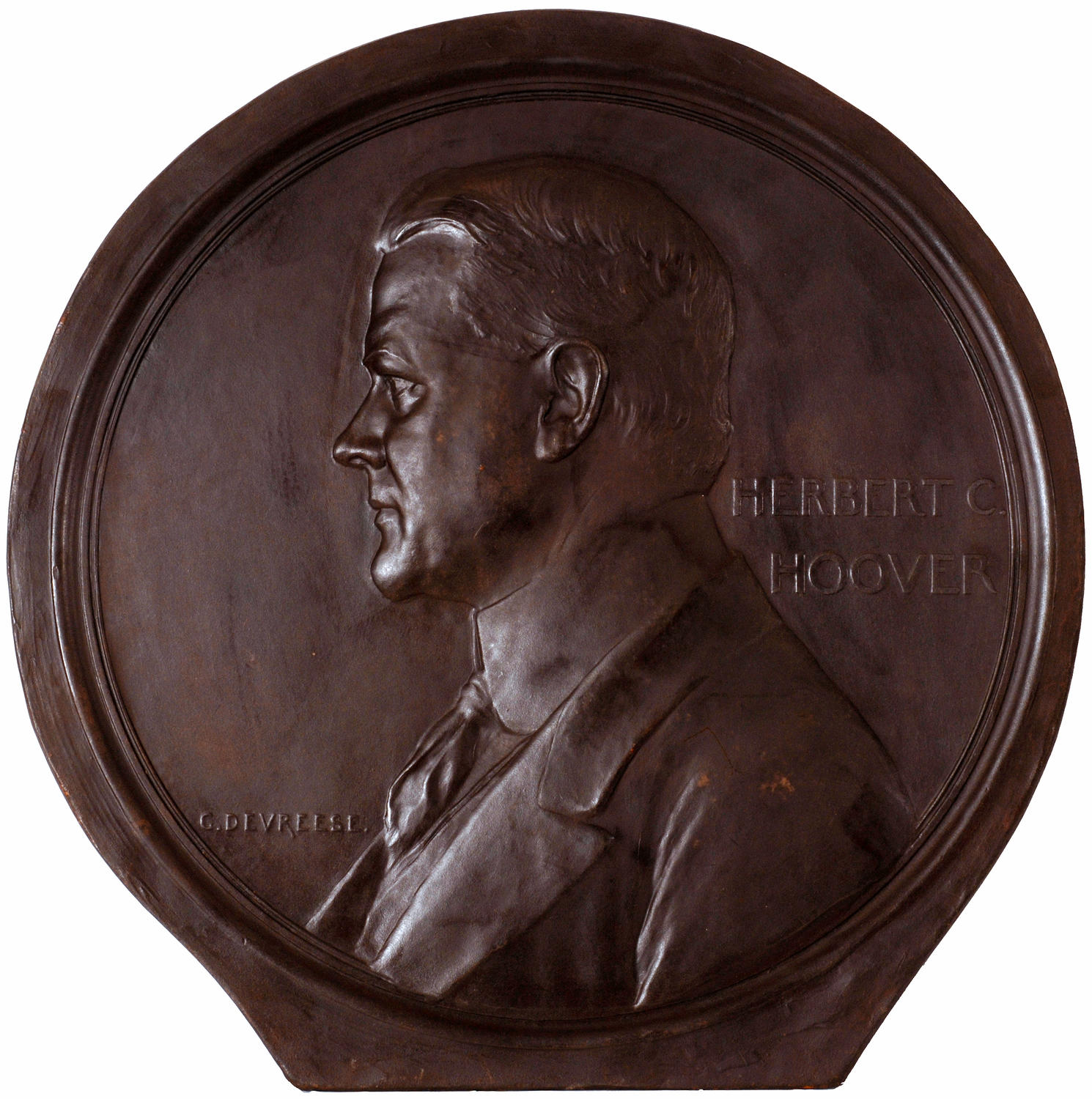
Medal depicting Herbert C. Hoover by Devreese Godefroi

A medal or medallion is a small portable artistic object, a thin disc, normally of metal, carrying a design, usually on both sides. They often have a commemorative purpose, and many are presented as awards. They may be intended to be worn, suspended from clothing or jewellery, although this has not always been the case. They may be struck by dies, as most coins are, or die-cast in a mould.

A medal may be awarded to a person or organisation as a form of recognition for sporting, military, scientific, cultural, academic, or various other achievements. Military awards and decorations are more precise terms for certain types of state decoration. Medals may also be created for sale to commemorate particular individuals or events, or as works of artistic expression in their own right. In the past, medals commissioned for an individual, typically with their portrait, were often used as a form of diplomatic or personal gift, with no sense of being an award for the conduct of the recipient.

An artist who creates medals or medallions is called a "medalist". Medals have long been popular collectible items, and in numismatics form a class called either exonumia or militaria.

Technically, medallions are larger than medals, starting at three inches in diameter, and medalets are smaller, at less than an inch. Medallions are usually too large to be worn very comfortably, though in colloquial use, "medallion" is often used to refer to a medal used as the pendant of a necklace (as in the medallion man fashion style of the 1960s and 1970s), or for other types of medals. Medallions may also be called "table medals" because they are too large to be worn and can only be displayed on a wall, table top, desk, or cabinet.

== Main types ==
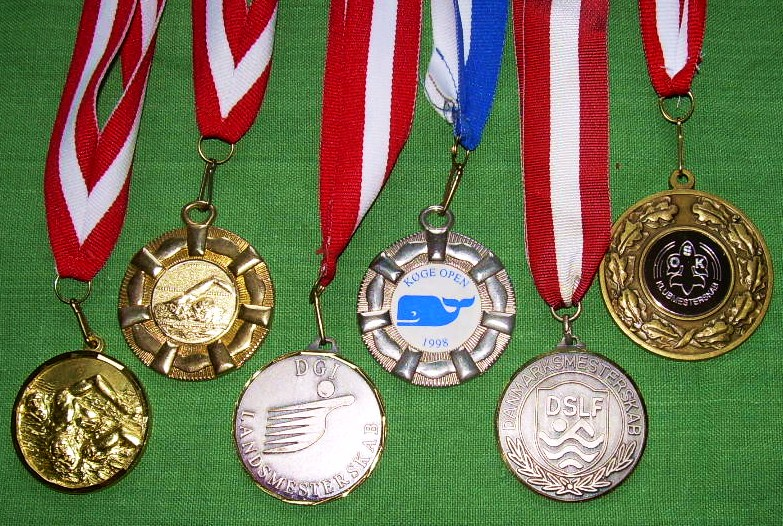
Various prize medals with obverse designs, suspension rings and ribbons typical of medals intended to be draped over the head and hung from the neck

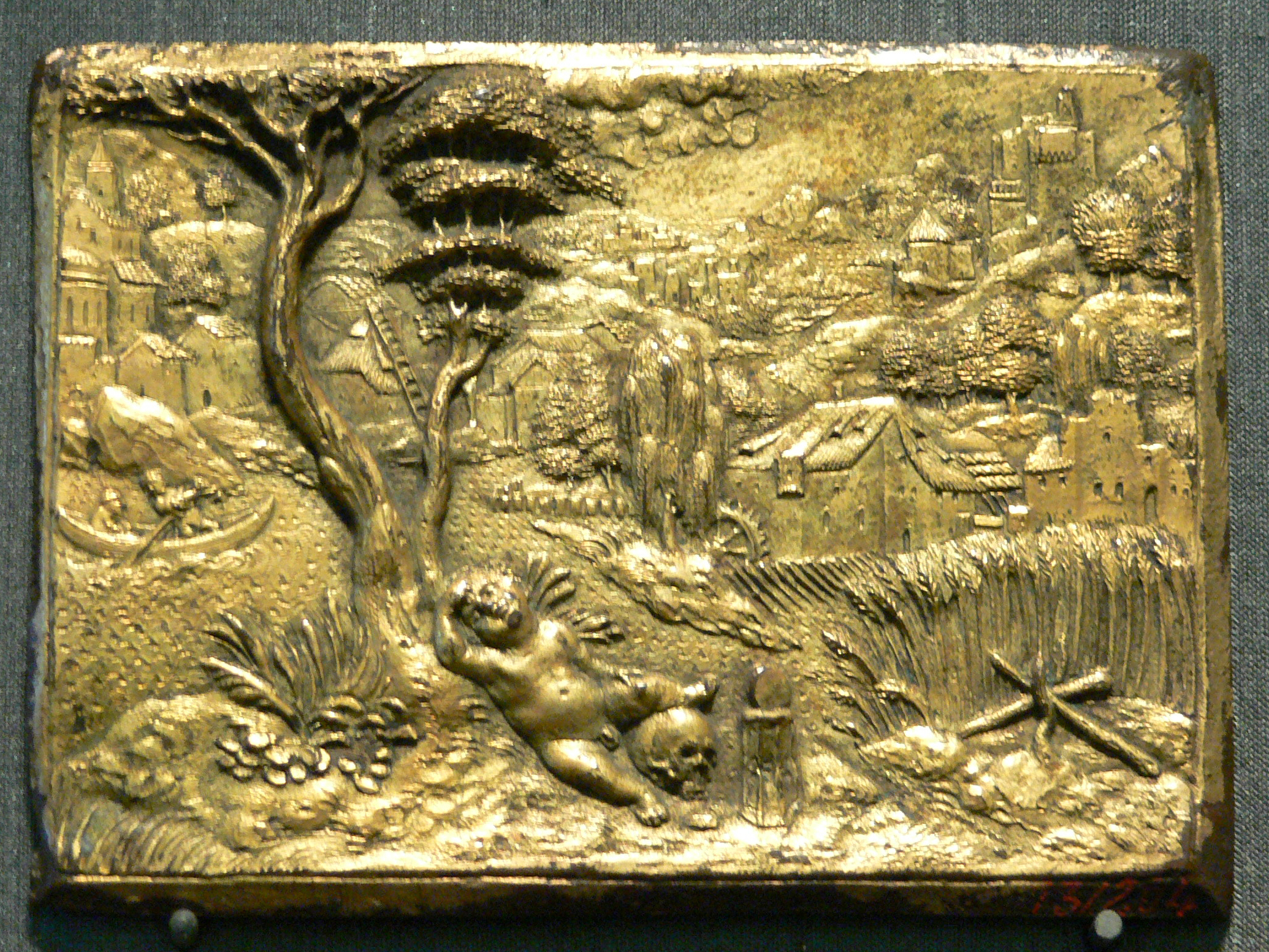
Plaquette by Peter Flötner, Vanitas, 1535–1540, gilt bronze. Created purely as an art object for a collector's market.

Numismatists divide medals into at least seven classes:

- Awards: awarded to a person or organization as a form of recognition for sporting, military, scientific, cultural, academic, or various other achievements. Military awards and decorations are more precise terms for certain types of state decoration. Military decorations are often in shapes such as crosses or stars, but are still loosely called "medals", as in the star-shaped American Medal of Honor.
- Commemoratives: created for sale to commemorate particular individuals or events, or as works of medallic art in their own right.
- Souvenirs: similar to a commemorative, but more focused on a place or event like state fairs, expositions, museums, historic sites, etc., and frequently found for sale within their respective souvenir shops.
- Religious: devotional medals may be worn for religious reasons.
- Portraits: produced to immortalize a person with their portrait; European portrait medallions sometimes bear the Latin word aetatis ("of his age") to describe the depicted person's age at the time of the portrait.
- Artistic: made purely as an art object. Plaquettes are often of this type.
- Society medals: made for societies used as a badge or token of membership.

== Etymology ==
First attested in English in 1578, the word medal is derived from the Middle French médaille, itself from Italian medaglia, and ultimately from the post-classical Latin medalia, meaning a coin worth half a denarius. The word medallion (first attested in English in 1658) has the same ultimate derivation, but this time through the Italian medaglione, meaning "large medal". There are two theories as for the etymology of the word medalia: the first being that the Latin medalia itself is derived from the adjective medialis meaning "medial" or "middle"; the second being that medaglia comes from the Vulgar Latin metallea (moneta), meaning "metal (coin)" and that from Latin metallum, which is the latinisation of the Greek μέταλλον (metallon), "a mine".

== Features ==
Traditionally medals are stamped with dies on a durable metal flan or planchet, or cast from a mould. The imagery, which usually includes lettering, is typically in low relief, albeit often higher than on coins: Limited-edition medals may be struck in repeated impacts allowing more metal displacement than in coins produced for mass circulation in a single impact. Circular medals are most common; rectangular medals are often known as plaquettes, and square medals as klippe. The "decoration" types often use other shapes, especially crosses and stars. These in particular usually come with a suspension loop, and a wide coloured ribbon with a clip at the top, for attaching to clothing worn on the chest.

The main or front surface of a medal is termed the obverse, and may contain a portrait, pictorial scene, or other image along with an inscription. The reverse, or back surface of the medal, is not always used and may be left blank or may contain a secondary design. It is not uncommon to find only an artistic rendering on the obverse, while all details and other information for the medal are inscribed on the reverse. The rim is found only occasionally employed to display an inscription such as a motto, privy mark, engraver symbol, assayer's marking, or a series number.

Medals that are intended to be hung from a ribbon also include a small suspension piece at the crest with which to loop a suspension ring through. It is through the ring that a ribbon is run or folded so the medal may hang pendent. Medals pinned to the breast use only a small cut of ribbon that is attached to a top bar where the brooch pin is affixed. Top bars may be hidden under the ribbon so they are not visible, be a plain device from which the ribbon attaches, or may even be decorative to complement the design on the medal. Some top bars are elaborate and contain a whole design unto themselves.

Bronze has been the most common material used to create medals, due to its fair price range, durability, ease with which to work when casting, and the ample availability. However, a wide range of other media have also been used. Rarer metals have been employed, such as silver, platinum, and gold, when wishing to add value beyond the mere artistic depiction, as well as base metals and alloys such as copper, brass, iron, aluminum, lead, zinc, nickel, and pewter. Medals that are made with inexpensive material might be gilded, silver-plated, chased, or finished in a variety of other ways to improve their appearance. Medals have also been made of rock, gemstone, ivory, glass, porcelain, terra cotta, coal, wood, paper, enamel, lacquerware, and plastics.

== History ==
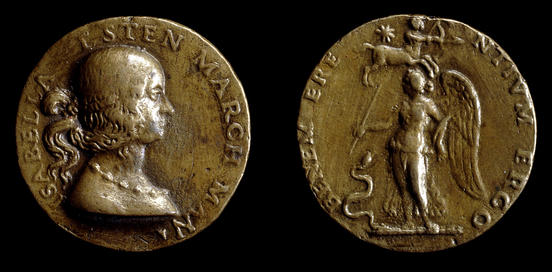
Bronze medal of Isabella d'Este, princess and patron of Renaissance humanists, distributed as a gift.

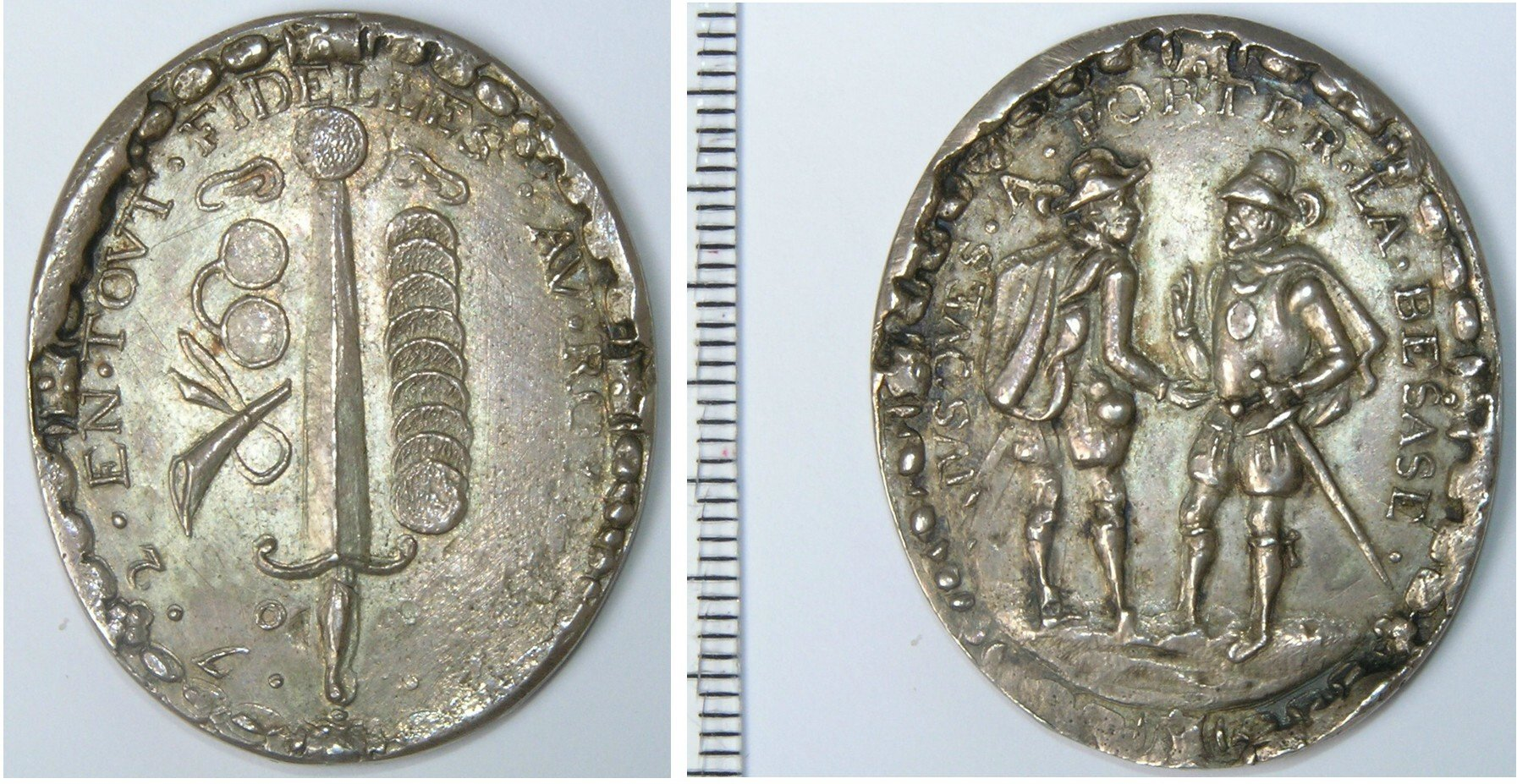
Silver Geuzen medal commemorating the Capture of Brielle in 1572 by the Sea Beggars; this was produced commercially

The first known instance of a medal being awarded comes from the historian Josephus who, writing long after the event, accounts that in the second century BCE, the High Priest Jonathan led the Hebrews in aid of Alexander Balas, and that in return for this, Alexander "...sent to Jonathan... honorary awards, as a golden button, which it is custom to give the king's kinsmen." Roman emperors used both military awards of medals, and political gifts of medallions that were like very large coins, usually in gold or silver, and die-struck like coins. Both these and actual golden coins were often set as pieces of jewellery, worn by both sexes.

The bracteate is a type of thin gold medal, usually plain on the reverse, found in Northern Europe from the so-called "Dark Ages" or Migration Period. They often have suspension loops and were clearly intended to be worn on a chain as jewellery. They imitate, at a distance, Roman imperial coins and medallions, but have the heads of gods, animals, or other designs. The Liudhard medalet, produced around AD 600 in Anglo-Saxon England, is an isolated example, known from a single copy, of a Christian medal, featuring an inscription naming Liudhard (or "Saint Letard"), the first priest among the Anglo-Saxons, and most likely presented to converts. The surviving example is mounted for wearing as jewellery.

In Europe, from the late Middle Ages on, it became common for sovereigns, nobles, and later, intellectuals to commission medals to be given simply as gifts to their political allies to either maintain or gain support of an influential person. The medals were made in a range of metals, such as gold, silver-gilt, silver, bronze, and lead, depending on the status of the recipient. They were typically up to about three inches across, and usually featured the head of the donor on the obverse, surrounded by an inscription with their name and title, and their emblem on the reverse, with a learned motto inscribed round the edges. Such medals were not usually intended to be worn, although they might have been set as pendants on a chain. From the 16th century onward, medals were made, both by rulers for presentation and private enterprise for sale, to commemorate specific events, including military battles and victories, and from this grew the practice of awarding military medals specifically to combatants, though initially only a few of the much higher-ranking officers.

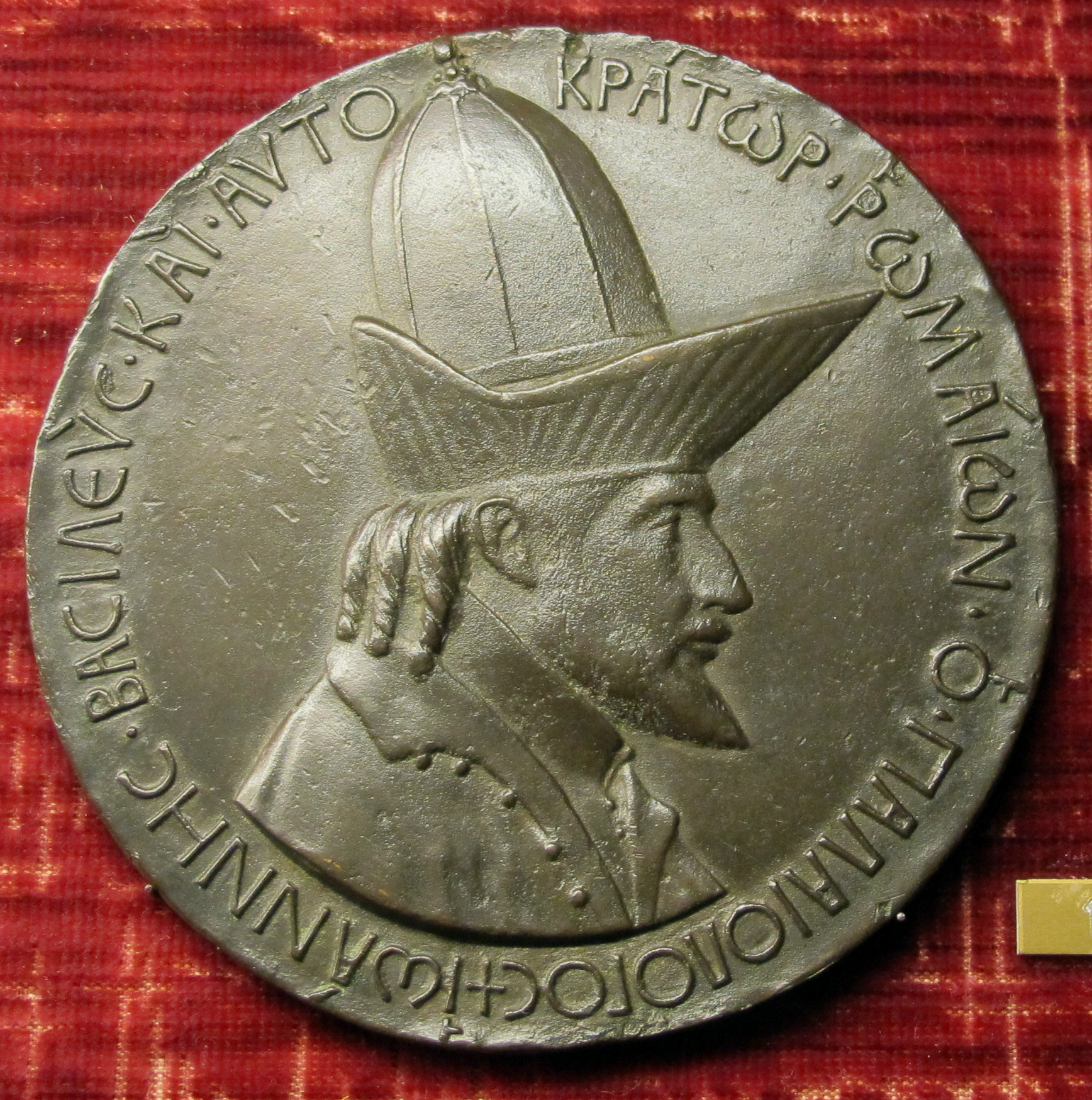
Medal of the Emperor John VIII Palaiologos during his visit to Florence, by Pisanello (1438). The legend reads, in Greek: "John the Palaiologos, basileus and autokrator of the Romans".

The medieval revival seems to have begun around 1400 with the extravagant French prince Jean, Duc de Berry, who commissioned a number of large classicising medals that were probably produced in very small numbers, or a unique cast. Only casts in bronze from the originals in precious metal survive, although it is known that at least some medals were also set with jewels, and these may well have been worn on a chain. At the same period, the first known post-classical medal commemorating a victory was struck for Francesco Carrara (Novello) on the occasion of the capture of Padua in 1390. The Italian artist Pisanello, generally agreed to be the finest medallist of the Renaissance, began in 1438 with a medal, celebrating the visit of the Byzantine Emperor John VIII Palaiologos to Italy. This was presumably a commercial venture, but his later medals were mostly commissioned for distribution as gifts by rulers or nobles. Like almost all early Renaissance medals, it was cast rather than die-struck. With each successive cast the medal became slightly smaller, and the numbers that could be produced were probably not large. A lead "proof" was probably often used. The association between medals and the classical revival began to take a rather different form, and the exchange of medals became associated with Renaissance Humanism. Princes would send humanist writers and scholars medals in recognition of their work, and the humanists began to make their own medals, normally in bronze, to send to their patrons and peers. The fashion remained restricted to Italy until near the end of the 15th century, when it spread to other countries. By the 16th century, medals were increasingly produced by rulers or cities for propaganda purposes. In 1550, a die-stamping machine, using steel dies, was introduced in Augsburg, Germany, and soon this process became standard. The artist now cut an intaglio die rather than modelling in relief.

By the 16th century, the wearing of smaller medals on a chain was a persistent fashion for both sexes, and a variety of medals were produced commercially for the purpose, commemorating persons or events, or just with non-specific suitable sentiments. German artists had been producing high-quality medals from the beginning of the century, while the French and British were slower to produce fine work. However, by the late 17th century, most parts of Western Europe could produce fine work. Some medals were also collected, which continues to the present day. Official medals, from which specialized military awards descended, were increasingly produced, but the real growth in military medals did not come until the 19th century.

In the East, a wide variety of medals and decorations have been given by the Ottoman Empire since the 18th century.

Devotional medals became very popular in Catholic countries. Very famous is the Miraculous Medal, whose design was created based on the apparitions of the Blessed Virgin Mary to Saint Catherine Labouré in Paris. In 1832, during an epidemic, the first medals were distributed, to which numerous healings and conversions were attributed, receiving the name of Miraculous Medal and distributed to millions of people around the world.

During the Reformation there had also been a vigorous tradition of Protestant medals, more polemical than devotional, which continued with the Geuzen medals produced in the Dutch Revolt.

== Military medals and decorations ==
Military decorations, service awards, and medals are often mistakenly confused with one another. Decoration is a term for awards which require specific acts of heroism or achievement (such as the British Victoria Cross or American Silver Star), whereas a service award or campaign medal is awarded for serving in a particular capacity in a particular geographical area and time frame (such as the Iraq Campaign Medal). In either case, an award or decoration may be presented as a medal.

The Roman Republic adopted an elaborate system of military awards that included medals called phalerae to be issued to soldiers and units for a variety of achievements. The practice was revived in the Early Modern period, and medals began to be worn on the chest as part of standard military uniform. The United States Continental Congress awarded the Fidelity Medallion as early as 1780, to three specified men for a particular incident, as a one-off award, which was characteristic of early military decorations. In 1782, the Badge of Military Merit was established, and mostly awarded to non-officers. The Légion d'honneur instituted by Napoleon I in 1802 had some of the characteristics of the old military orders, but was intended to be far more inclusive, and was awarded to rank and file soldiers for bravery or exceptional service. Other nations followed with decorations such as the British Army Gold Medal from 1810, though this only went to senior officers, and the Prussian Iron Cross from 1813. Medals were not awarded to all combatants in a war or battle until the 19th century, when the Waterloo Medal was the first British medal given to all present, at the Battle of Waterloo and all associated actions in 1815. By the middle of the 19th century, the number of awards used had greatly expanded in most countries to something near modern levels.

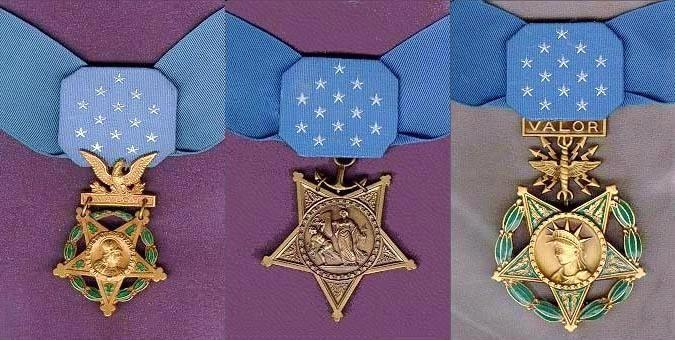
The United States' Medals of Honor (l to r: Army, Navy, Air Force), for "Conspicuous gallantry and intrepidity at the risk of life above and beyond the call of duty".

An order tends to be the most elaborate of military decorations, typically awarded for distinguished services to a nation or to the general betterment of humanity. Orders are distinguished from other forms of decoration in that they often imply membership in an organization or association of others that have received the same award. Two of the most well known and commonly awarded orders are the Légion d'honneur of France (military and civil) and the civil Order of the British Empire. The practice of conferring orders originates with the mediaeval fraternities of knighthood, some of which still exist and are still awarded. While most modern orders have no roots in knighthood, they still tend to carry over the terms of their historic counterparts, and terms such as knight, commander, officer, members, and so on are still commonly found as ranks. A military order may use a medal as its insignia, however, most tend to have a unique badge or a type of plaque specifically designed for an emblem.

The Medal of Honor is the highest military decoration awarded by the United States Government, and is an example of a decoration that is modeled as a military order, even though not expressly defining itself as one (The Legion of Merit distinctly serves this purpose, and unlike any other U.S. military decoration, has classes). It is bestowed on a member of the United States Armed Forces who distinguishes himself, "conspicuously by gallantry and intrepidity at the risk of his life above and beyond the call of duty while engaged in an action against an enemy of the United States." Each of the three departments of the American armed forces has a unique picture displayed on a medal, which is in turn displayed upon a star-shaped heraldic badge. The medal of the U.S. Army depicts the head of Minerva, the U.S. Navy medal shows a scene of Minerva doing battle with Discord, and the U.S. Air Force depicts the Statue of Liberty upon its medal.

Military decorations, including medals and orders, are usually presented to the recipient in a formal ceremony. Medals are normally worn on more formal occasions and are suspended from a ribbon of the medal's colours on the left breast, while a corresponding ribbon bar is to be worn to common events where medals would be inappropriate or impractical to wear.

== Table medals and other large forms ==
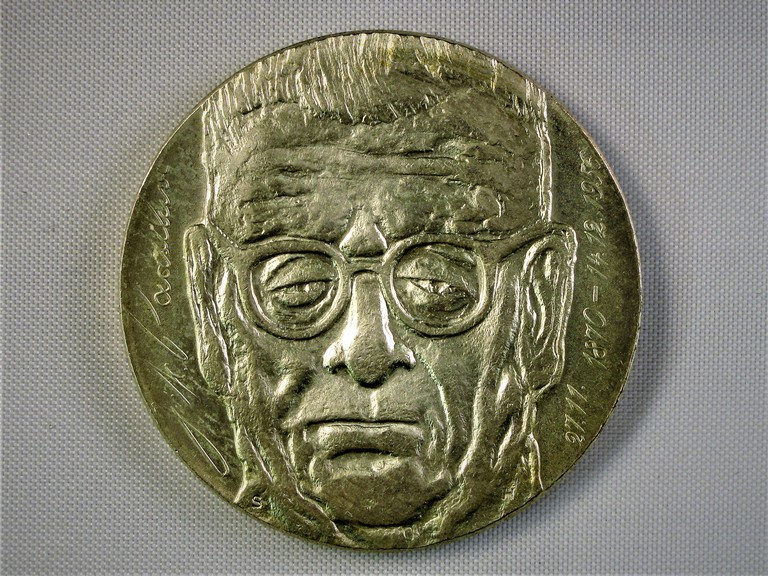
Commemorative medal of Finnish president J. K. Paasikivi, designed by Heikki Häiväoja

Medallion is a vague term, often used for larger, usually circular, medals, which might be worn as pendants round the neck. It is the correct term for such medals from the late Roman Empire, typically distributed by the emperor and bearing his image, but in later periods larger medals are best termed just as medals.

Generally circular, table medals are issued for artistic, commemoration, or souvenir purposes, not for commerce, and are too large to be plausibly worn. Tokens and table medals of coin-like appearance are part of the exonumia subcategory of numismatics, while orders, decorations, and medals are considered militaria (military related). The Nobel Foundation, the organization awarding the prestigious Nobel Prize, presents each winner, "an assignment for the amount of the prize, a diploma, and a gold medal..." This medal would be displayed framed like a picture, on a table, wall or in a cabinet, rather than be worn by the winner.

The Carnegie Hero Foundation is the issuer of a bravery medal, most commonly issued in the US, Canada, and the UK. This large bronze table medal features Andrew Carnegie's likeness on the obverse and the name of the awardee and citation engraved on the reverse. It is usually issued for lifesaving incidents. In the U.S. Military, challenge coins are a type of relatively unofficial medal given to boost morale, and sometimes to act as convenient passes for unit members.

Also related are plaques and plaquettes, which may be commemorative, but especially in the Renaissance and Mannerist periods were often made for purely decorative purposes, with often crowded scenes from religious, historical or mythological sources. While usually metal, table medals have been issued in wood, plastic, fibre, and other compositions. The US Government awards gold medals on important occasions, with bronze copies available for public sale.

== Fraternal jewels ==
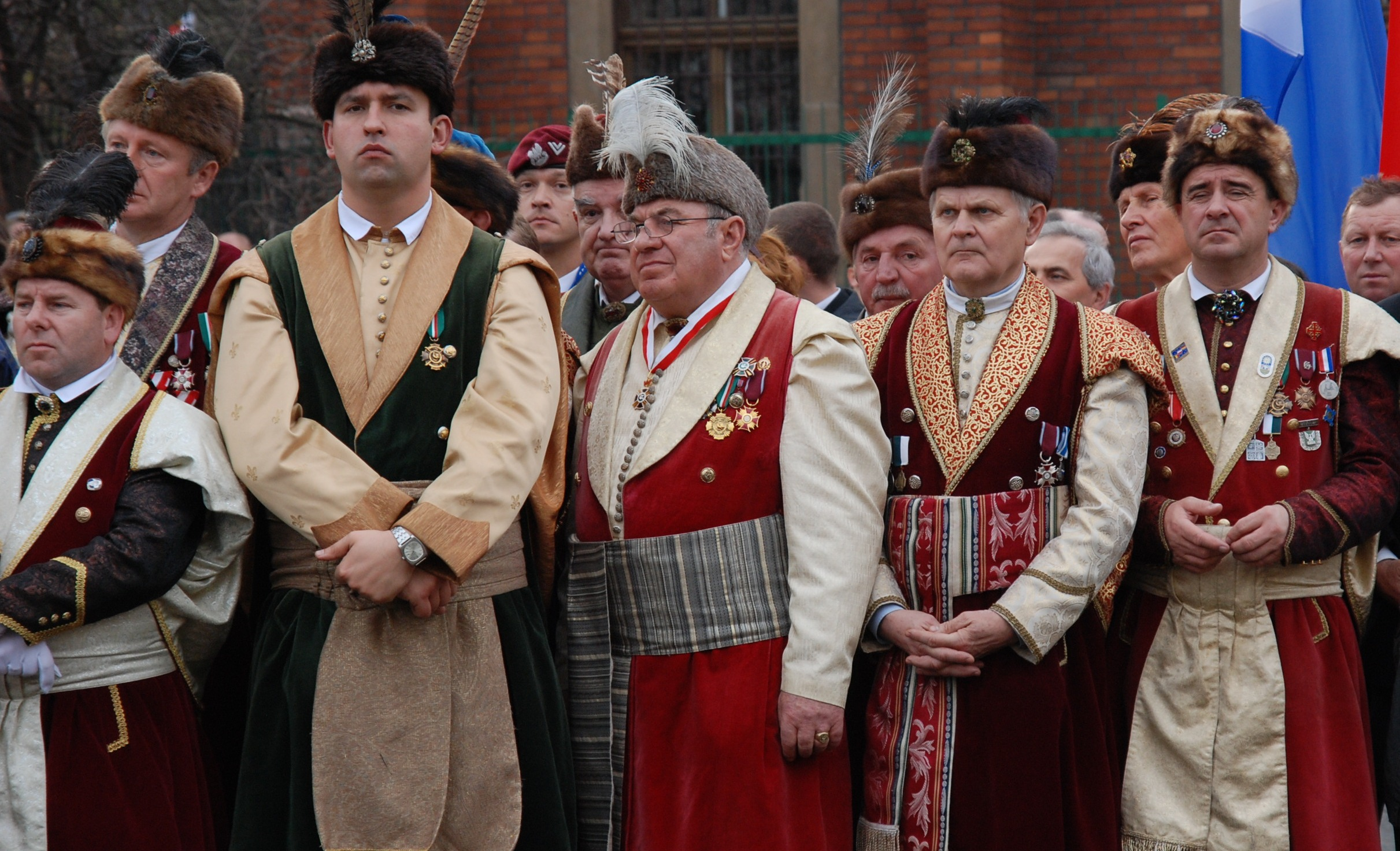
Breast jewels (medals) worn by members of a secular fraternity in Poland.

Amongst the many fraternal organisations which wear ceremonial regalia, the use of medals is commonplace. In many prominent fraternal organisations, fraternal medals are known as jewels. Their purpose varies, and may include use as a badge of membership, an indication of rank, a symbol of office within the fraternity, or an indication of support having been given to a designated charitable cause (so-called charity jewels). Common secular fraternities using jewels (medals) in the English-speaking world include Freemasonry, the Orange Order, the Royal Antediluvian Order of Buffaloes, and the Oddfellows. There are also religious fraternal organisations attached to certain Christian denominations (for example, the Catenian Association), also using medals as jewels of their Orders. Many of these organisations advertise jewels (medals) for sale on their corporate websites.

Fraternal jewels may be worn as military-style medals, on ribbons, from the left breast, or more prominently on collars or collarettes as part of the organisation's regalia. Historic examples of such medals and jewels may be found in many museums, particularly museums dedicated to fraternal organisations.

There is extensive trade in fraternal jewels and medals, with societies and associations existing to promote such trade, and to encourage the sharing of resources, and on-line resources available to support the hobby.

== Different metals ==
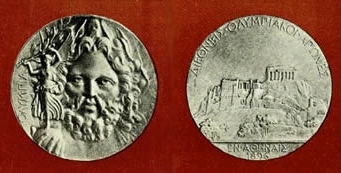
A silver medal was awarded to the winner of each event during the 1896 Summer Olympics. Recent Olympic medals are suspended as a pendant from a ribbon, and are awarded in gold, silver and bronze.

Traditionally, medals are made of the following metals, in order of decreasing value:

1. Platinum
2. Gold
3. Silver, or silver-gilt, which is in fact used for Olympic "gold medals"
4. Bronze
5. Pewter
6. Copper
7. Tin
8. Iron

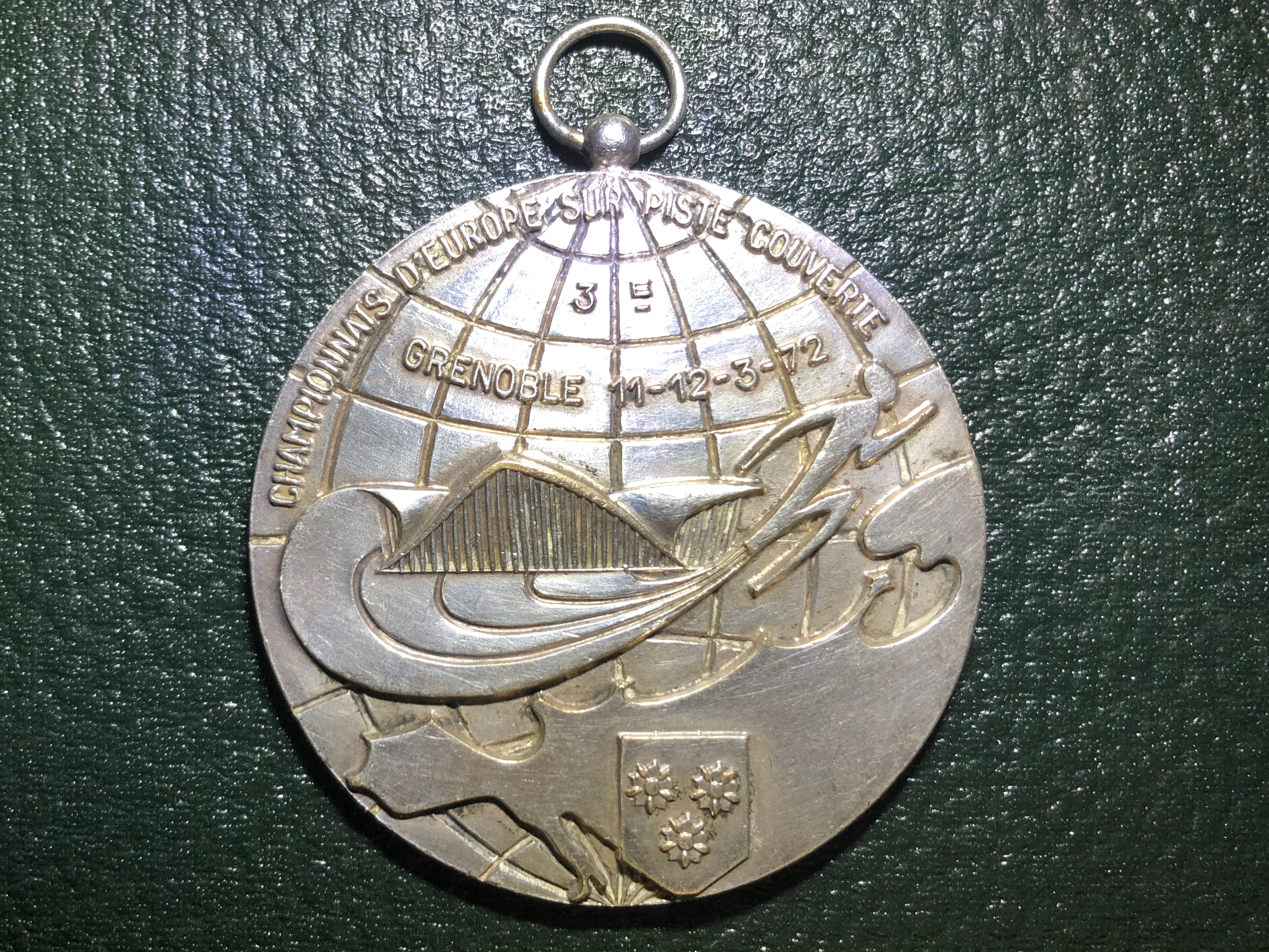
Silver 2nd place medal of European Athletic Indoor Games 11–12 March 1972

Many medals were and are made in several different metals, either representing awards for different places in a competition, or standards or classes, as with the Olympic medals, or simply different price levels for medals made for sale or donation by the commissioner. Medals have historically been given as prizes in various types of competitive activities, especially athletics. The gold, silver and bronze Olympic medals for first, second and third places were first used at the 1904 Summer Olympics. At the 1896 event, silver was awarded to winners and bronze to runners-up, while at 1900 other prizes were given, not medals. The medals for the London 2012 Summer Olympics are the largest ever, reflecting a trend for increasing size in Olympic medals.

== Medals as art ==
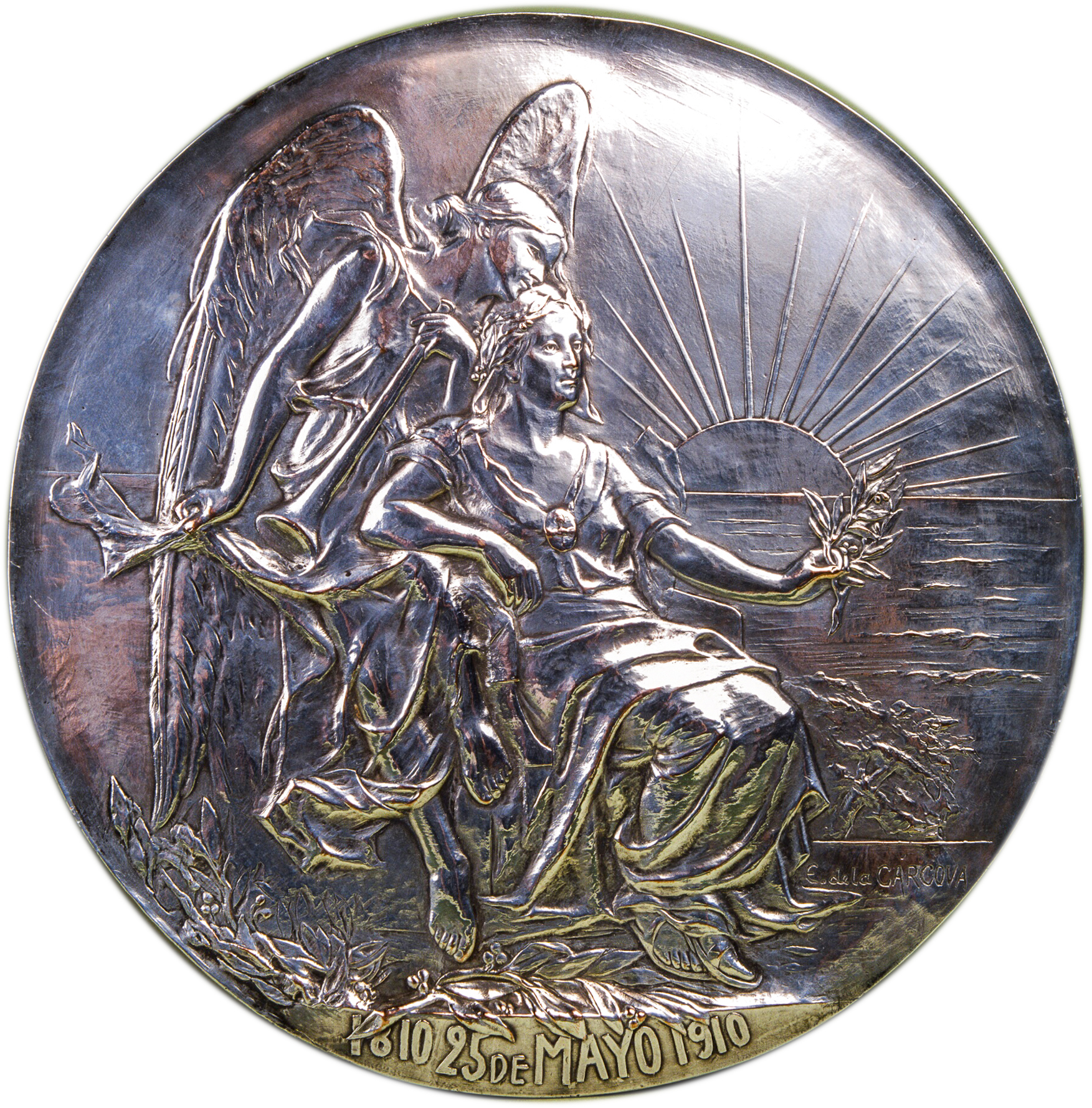
Commemorative Medal for the Centennial of Argentina by Ernesto de la Cárcova (1910)

The first well-known great artist to create medals was the Italian painter Antonio Pisano, also known as Pisanello, who modelled and cast a number of portrait medals of princes and scholars in the 1440s. Many other artists followed his example, in places such as Italy, the Low Countries, Germany, and France. In the seventeenth century medals were extensively used to commemorate events and glorify rulers. In the eighteenth century prize medals became common. In the 19th century art medals exploded in popularity. In the early part of the aforementioned century, David d'Angers produced a great series of portrait medals of famous contemporaries and in the latter part of the century, Jules-Clément Chaplain and Louis-Oscar Roty were among many highly regarded medalists. The early twentieth century saw art medals flourish, particularly in France, Italy, and Belgium, while later in the century Czechoslovakia, Hungary, Poland, the US, Canada, and England produced much high quality work.

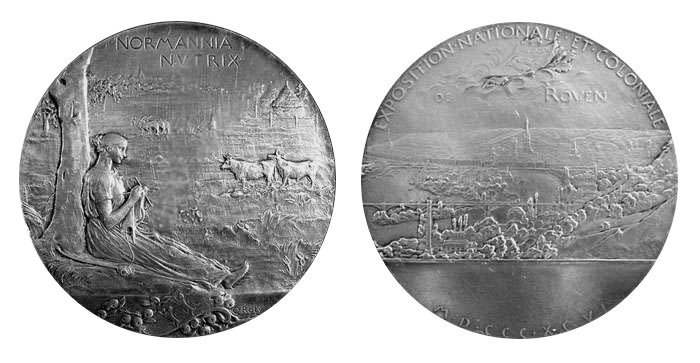
1896 Colonial Exposition medal, by Louis-Oscar Roty.

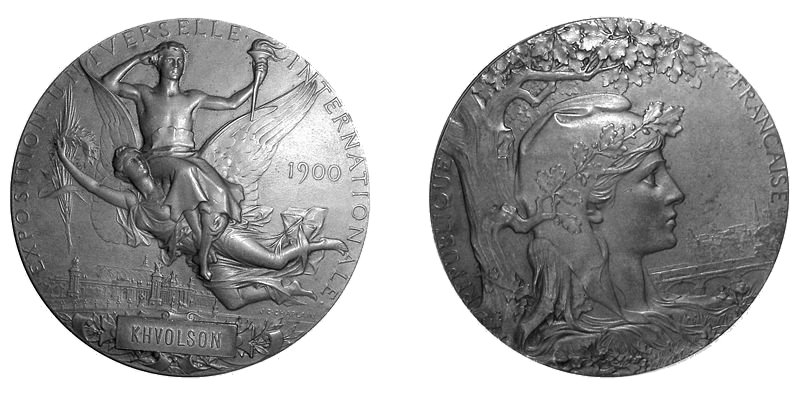
1900 Exposition Universelle medal, by Jules-Clément Chaplain.

== See also ==
- Exonumia
- Orders, decorations, and medals of Belgium
- List of highest military decorations
- Medalist
  - List of medallists
- Orders, decorations, and medals of Russia
- Orders and decorations of the Commonwealth realms
- Awards and decorations of the United States government
- Awards and decorations of the United States Armed Forces
- Military awards and decorations
- Medal ribbon
- Medal inflation
- The Supremacy Medallion of Henry VIII
