= Trial plate =

A Trial plate was a piece of metal used as a standard in the assaying of coins to determine a coin's accuracy and fineness. Plates made from various metals including copper, silver and gold were used in events such as the Trial of the Pyx as benchmarks of quality. A contender for the earliest known ingot-shaped silver trial plate that dates from 1279 and is held by the Royal Mint Museum in the United Kingdom.

== Bibliography ==
- Cherry, John (1992). Goldsmiths: Medieval Craftsmen. University of Toronto Press. ISBN 978-0802077110.
