= Jean Castaing =

Jean Castaing (fl. 1685–1700) was a French engineer and inventor of the Castaing machine, a device used to add edge lettering to coins. Though edge lettering had existed for over a century, the earliest methods were costly and time-consuming. In 1649, Peter Blondeau introduced a new method at the Royal Mint in England, which he kept secret. Later, in 1685, Castaing proposed that his machine be used in the mints of France. His proposal was approved, and Castaing later became general manager of all the mints in the nation.

Castaing introduced other ideas, including the reforming and recoining of already existing French coins with edge lettering to reduce instances of counterfeiting and raise money for King Louis XIV's efforts in the Nine Years' War. During the carrying out of one such operation, Castaing was accused of malversation. His wife, Marie Hippolyte Castaing (née Bosch) petitioned the court on his behalf, and he was freed two years later. He died at some point in the early 18th century.

== Castaing machine ==
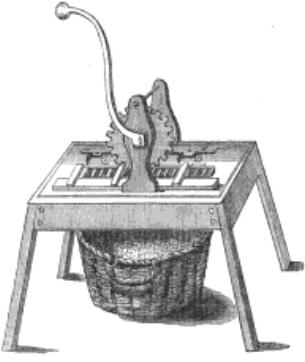
A nineteenth century illustration of Castaing's machine

Before milled coinage gained precedence in Europe, the irregular and crude hammered coinage was relatively easy to counterfeit and subject to clipping, an act which involved removing valuable metal from the edge of a coin before placing it back into circulation. In the sixteenth century, the French engineer Aubin Olivier introduced to France the coin press, to which he added a split collar capable of creating edge lettering. In order to remove the newly struck coin, the collar had to be disassembled, which was a time-consuming process. In addition, the upper coinage die was prone to strike the collar on its descent, causing expensive damage. Peter Blondeau addressed those concerns when, in 1649, he was summoned to the Royal Mint in England to modernise minting operations there. Blondeau introduced a method for edge lettering which he claimed was considerably faster and less costly than the earlier, well-known technology, but he maintained secrecy in regards to the device.

In c. 1679, Jean Castaing invented a machine capable of applying edge lettering to 20,000 coins daily. He approached the French government in 1685 in the hope of getting it adopted into use at the French mints. King Louis XIV was a proponent of the machine, but its introduction was opposed by Jean-Baptiste Colbert, Louis' financial minister, who believed edge lettering unnecessary and the machines too costly to install. In 1686, however, Castaing's proposal was approved by the Council of State, and he entered into a contract to install his machine at the various French mints.

== Recoining and arrest ==
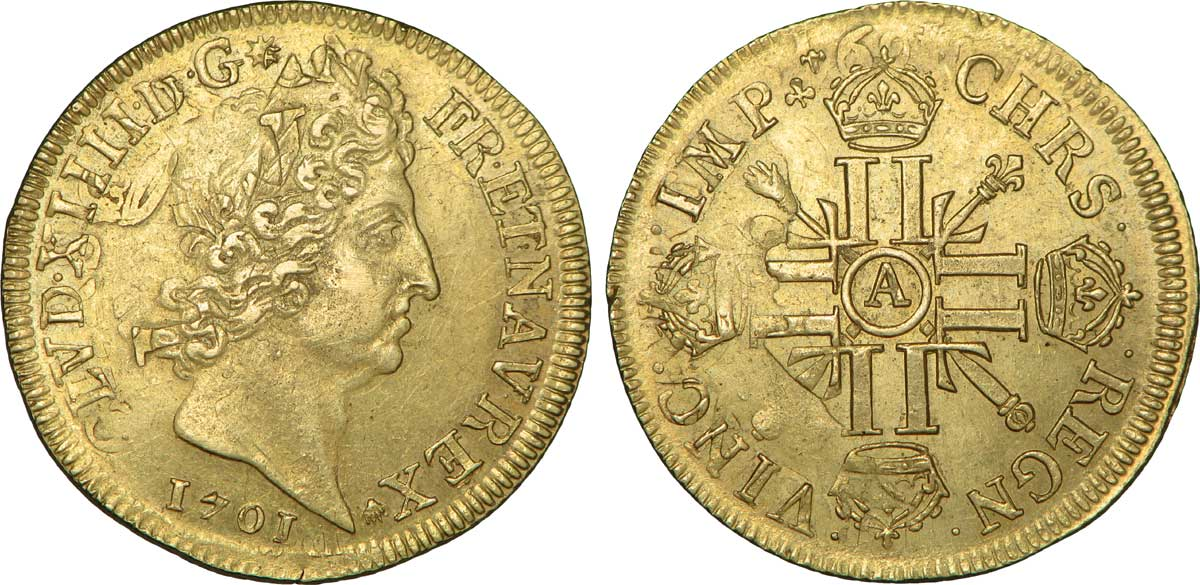
A 1701 gold Louis d'or, overstruck using Castaing's method. An older 1690s date is visible on the reverse

In 1688, Castaing proposed a method of reshaping and restriking existing coins, both as a response to counterfeiting and to help the Louis XIV raise money to support the Nine Years' War. The French government approved Castaing's method, because it was considerably less costly than the alternative method of melting the coins before restriking them. A Paris tinsmith, Martin Masselin, was chosen to undertake the job of annealing, blanching, and edge-marking (Note: Masselin was obliged to pay Castaing an annual fee of 2,000 livres for the use of his machine in this process.) the recoined pieces; he was paid fourteen deniers for each coin, with an additional 17 deniers for each restruck within the first three months of his contract. In 17 months of his contract, a deficit of 150,000 livres was discovered at the Paris Mint, and Masselin was charged with stealing the pieces. He and his clerks in Paris and at the provincial mints were dismissed, and in 1691, Castaing was given general management of all twenty-six French mints and the task of restriking the old coinage. Castaing was paid eight deniers for each coin restruck, and when the King ordered a second reformation of the currency in 1693, Castaing's wage was reduced to three deniers per coin.

On 21 March 1700, Castaing was arrested on charges of malversation, including using inaccurate scales to weigh the coins prior to their being reminted and stealing. According to the numismatist George E. Ewing Jr., Castaing's accuser, Jacques Fournier de Saint Andre, was engaged in a conspiracy along with two Paris Mint guard judges, men named Maigret and Burgoing, with the intent of having Castaing wrongly convicted. Ewing states that Fournier desired Castaing's position as general manager, and Maigret wanted to evict the inventor, to whom he was obliged to rent an apartment near the Mint for the mandated price of 450 livres annually, so he could raise the rent. Castaing's wife, Marie Hippolyte Castaing (née Bosch) was angered by the charges against her husband, petitioning Fournier to compensate them 10,000 livres for damages as well as offer an apology. She accused Fournier of being a "slanderer, impostor and an ignorant in money matters," and charged that he and the two guard judges had threatened to cause harm to Castaing due to his actions at the mints, which caused them to lose 30,000 livres following the King's 1693 decree. Two years after his arrest, the lawsuit against him was dropped by the Council of State, and Castaing was released. Fournier was ordered to pay him 6,000 livres in damages, as well as three-fourths of trial expenses. Castaing died at some point in the early eighteenth century.

== Bibliography ==
- Anonymous (1765). Denis Diderot (ed.). Encyclopédie. Vol. 10. Chez Samuel Faulche & Compaigne, Libraires & Imprimeurs.
- de Feller, François Xavier (1838). Biographie Universelle ou Dictionnaire Historique. Paris: Même Maison de Commerce.
- Ewing Jr., George E. (1985). "Origins of Edge Lettering on Early American Copper Coinage". America's Copper Coinage 1783-1857. New York, New York: American Numismatic Society. ISBN 0-89722-207-5.
- Ewing Jr., George E. (September 1985). "A Remembrance of Jean Castaing". The Numismatist. Colorado Springs, Colorado: American Numismatic Association.
- "Olivier, Aubin". The Monthly Numismatic Circular. XVI. Spink & Son's. 1908.
- Verture, George (1780). Medals, Coins, Great Seals, and Other Works of Thomas Simon: Engraved and Described by George Verture (Second ed.). J. Nichols.
