= Castaing machine =

Device used to add lettering and decoration to the edge of a coin

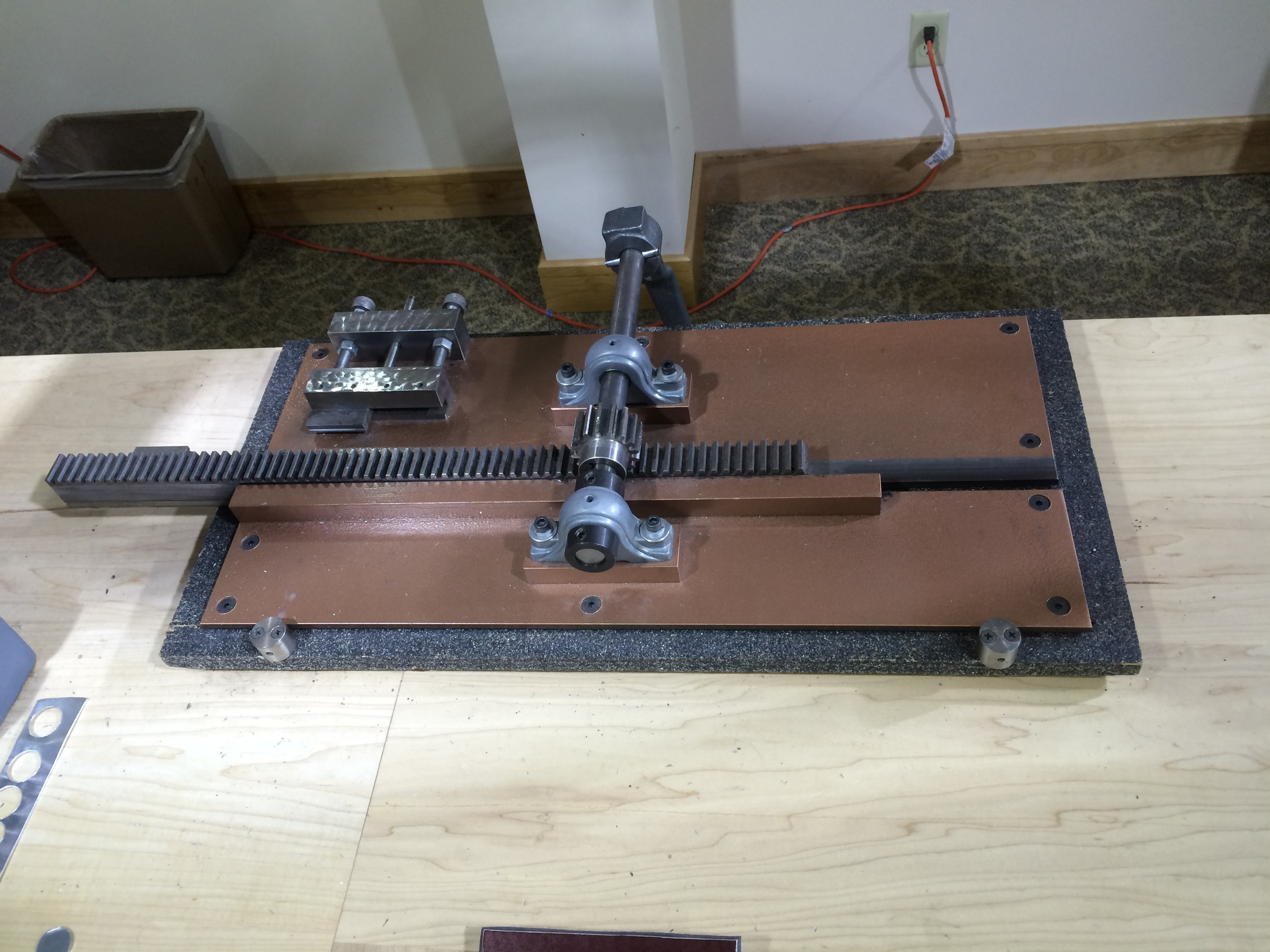
A Castaing machine, on display at the American Numismatic Association museum

The Castaing machine is a device used to add lettering and decoration to the edge of a coin. Such lettering was necessitated by counterfeiting and edge clipping, which was a common problem resulting from the uneven and irregular hammered coinage. When Aubin Olivier introduced milled coinage to France, he also developed a method of marking the edges with lettering which would make it possible to detect if metal had been shaved from the edge. This method involved using a collar, into which the metal flowed from the pressure of the press. This technique was slower and more costly than later methods. France abandoned milled coinage in favour of hammering in 1585.

England experimented briefly with milled coinage, but it was not until Peter Blondeau brought his method of minting coins there in the mid-seventeenth century that such coinage began in earnest in that country. Blondeau also invented a different method of marking the edge, which was, according to him, faster and less costly than the method pioneered by Olivier. Though Blondeau's exact method was secretive, numismatists have asserted that it likely resembled the later device invented by Jean Castaing. Castaing's machine marked the edges by means of two steel rulers, which, when a coinage blank was forced between them, imprinted legends or designs on its edge. Castaing's device found favour in France, and it was eventually adopted in other nations, including Britain and the United States, but it was eventually phased out by mechanised minting techniques.

== Background ==
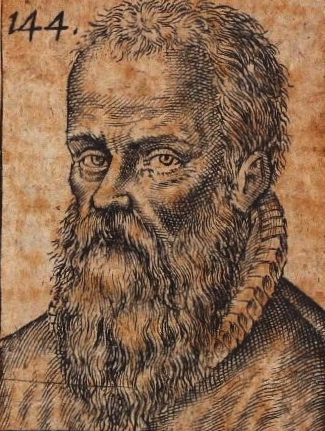
Aubin Olivier introduced the coinage press to France.

Prior to the introduction of milled coinage, hammered coinage, which resulted in a relatively crude product of irregular shape and size, predominated in European mints. In c. 1550, an Augsburg goldsmith named Max Schwab created a new technique for striking coins, which included the use of rolling mills, presses to cut the coinage blanks and the coinage press. After learning about the invention via the French ambassador, King Henry II dispatched the Comptroller of Finance Guillaume de Marillac and François Guilhem, Master of the Mint in Lyon, to observe the machinery. Schwab's press was turned with a weighted wooden handle, which exerted even pressure across the coinage blank, creating a sharper and more precise strike than hammering. De Marillac requested that Anne de Montmorency send him an engineer capable of creating a similar machine; he sent the engineer Aubin Olivier. Olivier viewed the machine, and introduced his own version to France, to which he later added a segmented collar. This allowed for the expanding metal to fill the collar, creating reeding, designs or edge lettering at the same time as the obverse and reverse images were struck onto the coin. The segments of the collar were then removed, and the coin ejected. Such lettering was used to aid in detecting coins which were debased by clipping metal from their edges, a problem frequently encountered in hammered coinage. Olivier's method of striking coins was considered costly relative to the previously utilised method, as the upper coinage die often came into contact with the collar on its downward descent, causing expensive damage. Milled coinage was thus abandoned in 1585 in favour of hammering.

Eloy Mestrelle introduced milled coinage to England in 1561, but its production ceased in 1575. On 8 August 1649, the Council of State and the House of Commons opted to summon Peter Blondeau, a Paris Mint engineer, to London to modernise operations at the Tower Mint. Mint officials opposed Blondeau's techniques, and subjected him to a series of trials in which the quality of his product would be compared to that made by the Mint. According to a pamphlet published in Blondeau's name, his process is described as "a new invention, to make a handsome coyne ... that shall not only be stamped flat on both sides, but shall even be marked with letters on the thickness of the brim," which was intended to prevent clipping. Blondeau described, in a proposition presumably meant for the Committee of the Mint, "two different ways to make the pieces marked about the thicknesse or edge. One is auncient, knowne to severall men, and according whereunto David Ramage [the man whom the Mint had selected to create hammered coinage in competition to Blondeau's], workeman of the Mint, hath made some bigg pieces; but that way is very tedious, requireth much time, spoyles abondance of stamps and engines, and cannot be done upon the currant money, which is thynne." Blondeau was referring to the type of collar added to the Paris Mint's early coinage presses by Olivier, which were time-consuming to use and caused significant damage to coinage dies and engines. He went on to say "[a]s touching the new way, which is ready and expeditious, and can be based upon the thynne and currant money, I am the inventor of it, and only I know itt, as I can make appeare by experiences, if it be the pleasure of the State to imploy me." Blondeau also argued that his methods would prevent counterfeiting, because the machinery required was too complex to be duplicated by criminals.

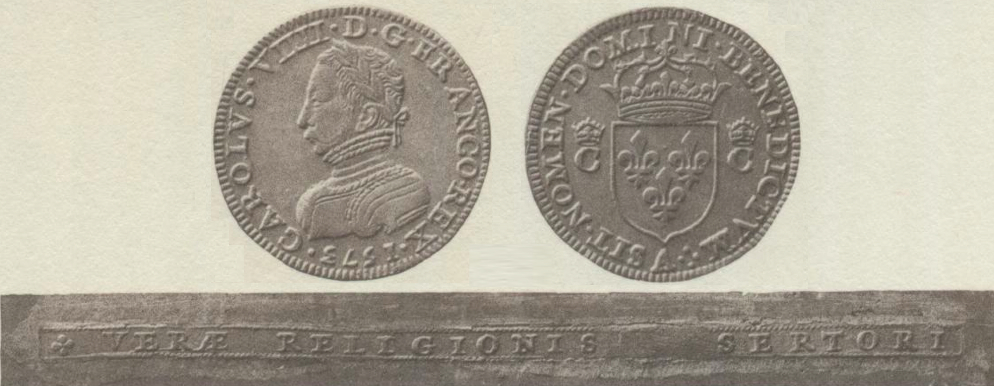
A 1573 French piedfort produced using a split collar, with its edge lettering shown beneath

Following his swearing in as Lord Protector in 1653, Oliver Cromwell became a proponent of Blondeau's coinage method, which had yet to find favour in the nation's minting establishment. In 1654, Cromwell's government placed Blondeau in charge of a planned mint in Ireland, where the coinage was heavily debased by fraudulent means. The proposed mint never came into existence, but in 1656, Blondeau was given official appointment to strike £2,000 worth of coins bearing Cromwell's portrait with captured Spanish silver. The former Royal Mint superintendent, William John Hocking, believed that the edge lettering on Blondeau's coinage was created by means of a perforated steel strip, through which the coin's metal flowed during striking, creating the raised designs and wording. Hocking suggested that this technique would have been less costly than the older method involving the split collar, because the steel strip could be replaced more economically. However, the numismatist Peter B. Gaspar determined that Blondeau's Cromwell-era coinage was struck without a collar, which suggests that he used a machine to impart the edge lettering prior to striking.

Blondeau returned to France following Cromwell's death, but he was summoned to return to London in 1661 following an order from King Charles II to modernise operations at the Mint. He received a contract from the Mint, which he fulfilled until his death in 1672, to work as an engineer for tools, to instruct moneyers, and to conduct his edge lettering process. In his diary, the Member of Parliament Samuel Pepys remarked upon the secrecy maintained by Blondeau regarding this process, stating that coiners at the Mint "mark the letters on the edges, which is kept as the great secret by Blondeau."

== Invention ==
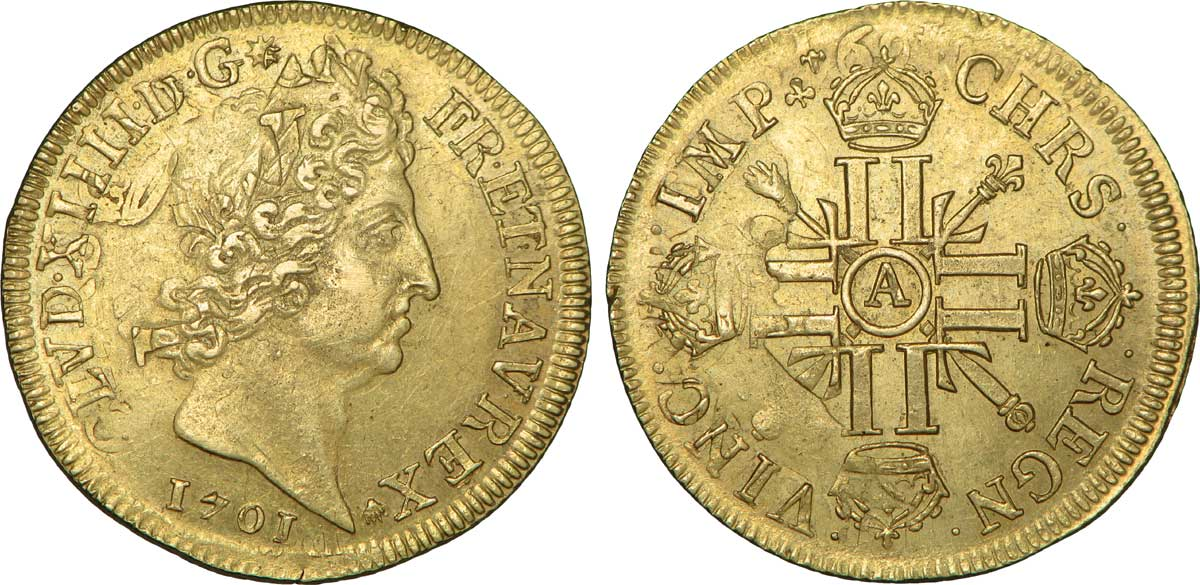
A 1701 gold Louis d'or, overstruck using Castaing's method. An older 1690s date is visible on the reverse.

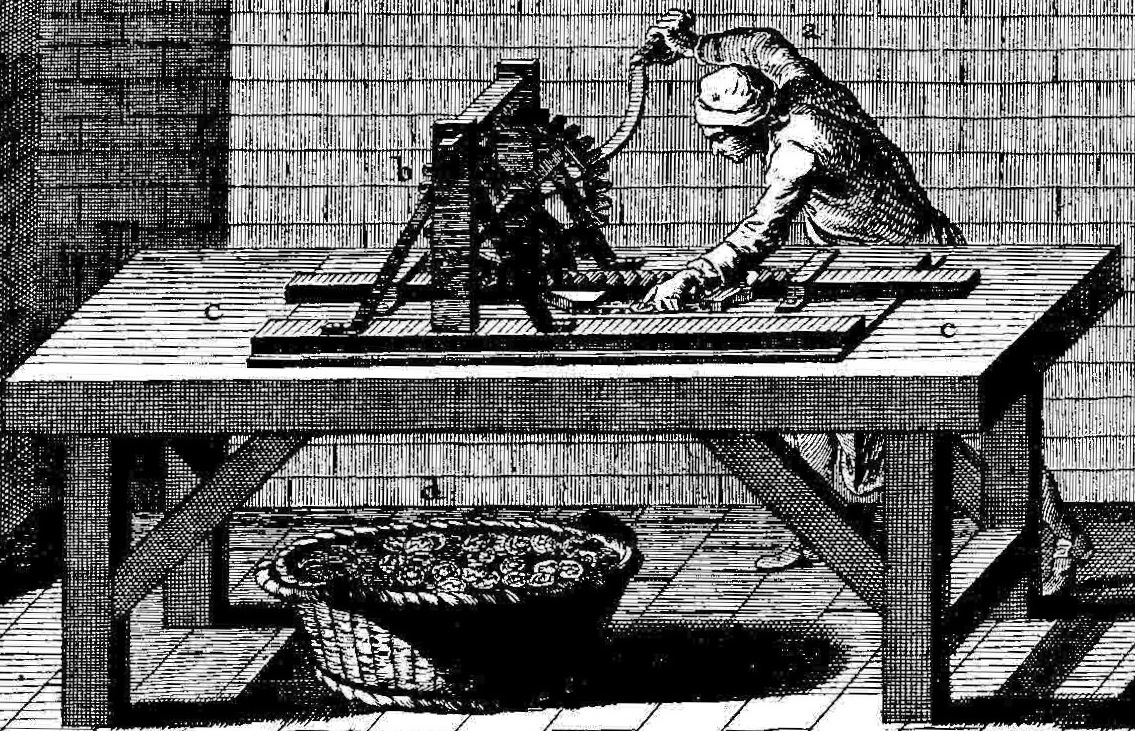
A 1765 illustration of Castaing's machine in use

Though production of hammered coinage ceased in France in 1645, edge lettering wasn't immediately reintroduced to that nation's milled coinage. At some point prior to 1679, Jean Castaing, a French engineer, invented a machine to apply edge lettering to coins, and in 1685, he approached the French government with a proposal to use his machine in that nation's mints. King Louis XIV favoured the invention, but his financial minister, Jean-Baptiste Colbert, believed that it would not be economically viable to pay the expenses required to put it into use. In 1686, over Colbert's objection, the French Council of State entered a contract with Castaing wherein all of the nation's gold and silver coinage would include edge lettering created by his machine.

Two years later, in 1688, in response to counterfeiting and to raise money to support the Nine Years' War, Castaing proposed a method of reshaping and restriking existing coins, which was ultimately accepted. Castaing's edge lettering machine was used on the overstruck coins, and the Royal Mint supervisor Martin Masselin, the individual who undertook the process, was obligated to pay Castaing for its use. In 1691, Masselin was dismissed, as he and his clerks were found to have stolen from the Mint during the reformation of the coinage, and Castaing was appointed to perform the edge lettering and restriking in his place. A second reform took place in 1693. Castaing was imprisoned in 1700 on charges of using inaccurate scales to weigh the coins to be reminted; according to his wife, Marie Hippolyte Castaing (née Bosch), the allegations were false, originating from opponents who lost money as a result of his machine's introduction to the French Mint and the resulting monetary reforms.

According to the engineer and numismatist George E. Ewing, Jr., Castaing's machine was likely similar to that used by Blondeau in England, but "Castaing's improvements made his machine worthy of being called an invention."

=== Operation ===
An 1819 account described the operation of Castaing's machine:

The machine used for this purpose consists of two plates of steel in form of rulers, on which the edging is engraved, half on the one, and half on the other. One of these plates is immovable, being strongly bound with screws to a copper plate on a board or table; the other is movable, and slides on the copper plate by means of a handle, and a wheel, or pinion, of iron, the teeth of which catch in other teeth, on the surface of the sliding plate. The planchet, being placed horizontally between these two plates, is carried along by the motion of the movable one; so as by the time that it had made half a turn, it is found marked all round.

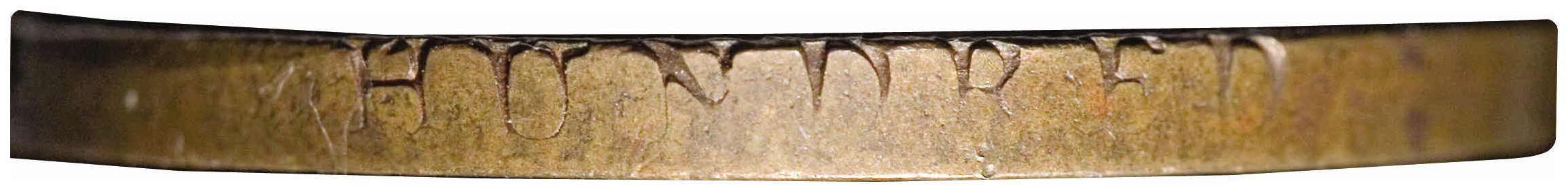
A portion of the edge lettering on a 1794 United States Liberty Cap large cent, applied by the Castaing machine

According to a 1765 Encyclopédie entry, Castaing's machine was capable of applying the edge lettering to 20,000 coins daily.

The machine came into use at various mints throughout the world as a way to improve upon the existing machinery used for edge lettering. A copy of Castaing's machine was put into use at the British Royal Mint, and in 1792, the director of the newly established United States Mint in Philadelphia, David Rittenhouse, ordered three coinage presses from England to which he added a modified version of the machine. This became obsolete following Franklin Peale's introduction of steam-powered equipment to the Mint in 1836. Castaing's machine was replaced at the Paris Mint in 1803, when one of the Mint's engineers, Philippe Gengembre, created his own version.

== Bibliography ==
- Craig, John (2010). The Mint: A History of the London Mint from A.D. 287 to 1948. Cambridge: Cambridge University Press. ISBN 978-0-521-17077-2.
- Ewing Jr., George E. (1985). "Origins of Edge Lettering on Early American Copper Coinage". America's Copper Coinage 1783–1857. New York, New York: American Numismatic Society. ISBN 0-89722-207-5.
- Ewing Jr., George E. (September 1985). "A Remembrance of Jean Castaing". The Numismatist. Colorado Springs, Colorado: American Numismatic Association.
- Gaspar, Peter P. (1976). "Simon's Cromwell Crown Dies in the Royal Mint Museum and Blondeau's Method for the Production of Lettered Edges". The British Numismatic Journal. XLVI. British Numismatic Society. Archived from the original on 2015-11-20.
- Henfrey, Henry William (1877). Numismata Cromwelliana: or, the Medallic History of Oliver Cromwell. London: John Russell Smith.
- Hocking, W.J. (1909). "Simon's Dies in the Royal Mint Museum, with Some Notes on the Early History of Coinage by Machinery". The Numismatic Chronicle and Journal of the Royal Numismatic Society. IX. London: Bernard Quaritch.
- de Jaucourt, Louis (1765). "MONNOYAGE au marteau et au moulin" [COINAGE by hammer and by mill]. In Denis Diderot (ed.). Encyclopédie. Vol. 10. Chez Samuel Faulche & Compaigne, Libraires & Imprimeurs. pp. 663–665 – via University of Chicago ARTFL Encyclopédie Project (Autumn 2022 Edition). "Cette machine est si commode qu'un seul homme peut marquer 20000 flancs en un jour." [This machine is so convenient a single man can mark 20000 edges in one day.]
- "Philippe Gengembre". The Numismatist. XXVI. Brooklyn, New York: American Numismatic Association. 1913.
- Pepys, Samuel (1904). Wheatley, Henry B. (ed.). The Diary of Samuel Pepys. Vol. III. London: George Bell and Sons.
- Rees, Abraham (1819). The Cyclopædia; or, Universal Dictionary of Arts, Sciences and Literature. Vol. VIII. A. Strahan.
- Seaby, Peter (1985). The Story of British Coinage. Spink & Son Ltd. ISBN 0-900652-74-8.
- "Olivier, Aubin". The Monthly Numismatic Circular. XVI. Spink & Son's. 1908.
- Ure, Andrew (1853). A Dictionary of Arts, Manufactures and Mines (4 ed.). Little, Brown & Co.
- Verture, George (1780). Medals, Coins, Great Seals, and Other Works of Thomas Simon: Engraved and Described by George Verture (Second ed.). J. Nichols.

Further reading

- de Bazinghen, François-André Abot (1764). Traité des Monnoies. Paris: Chez Guillyn.
