= Reeding =

Surface treatment technique

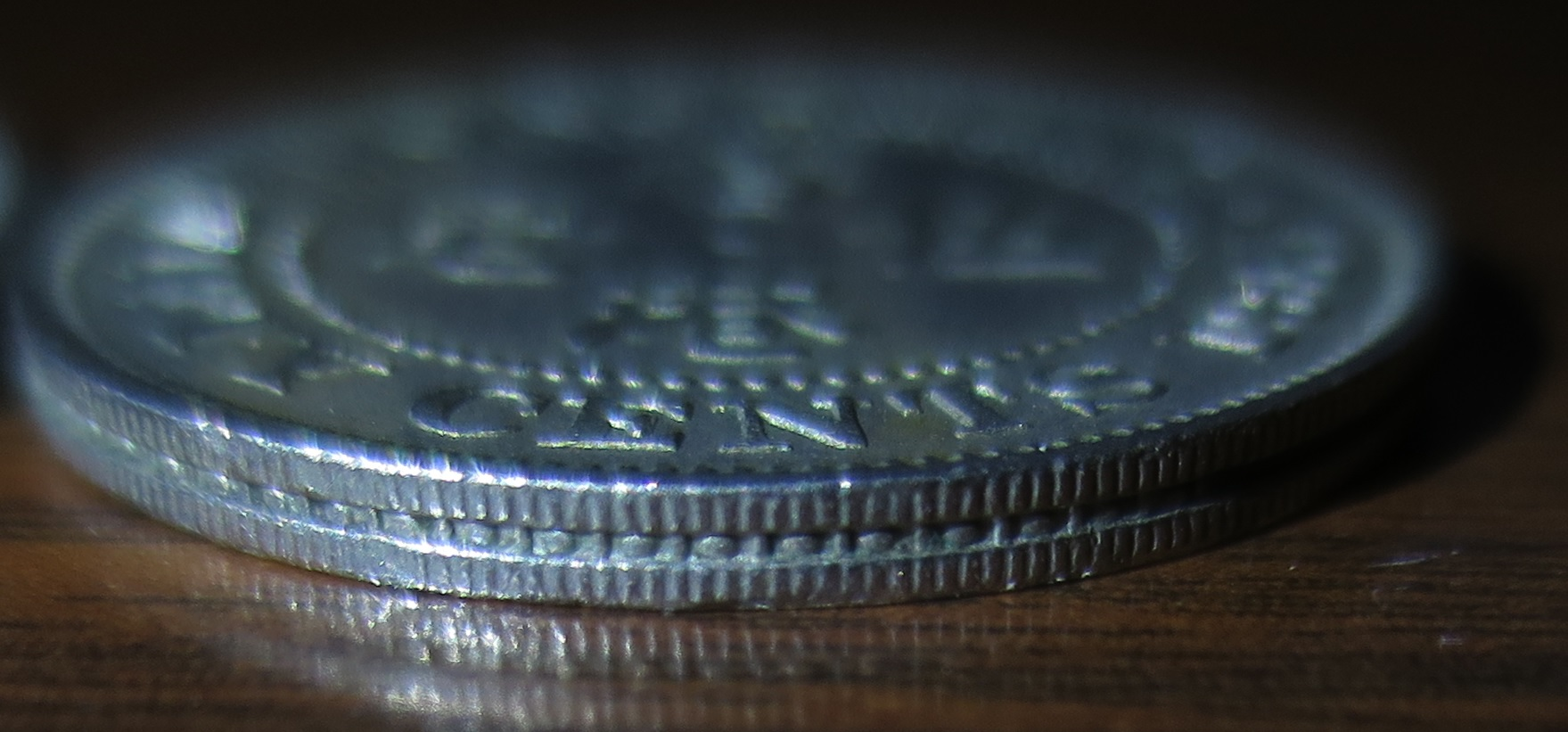
Milled edge of a 1951 Hong Kong 50¢ coin

Reeding or milling is a technique wherein a number of narrow ridges called "reeds" are carved or milled into a surface with a Castaing machine.

== Numismatics ==
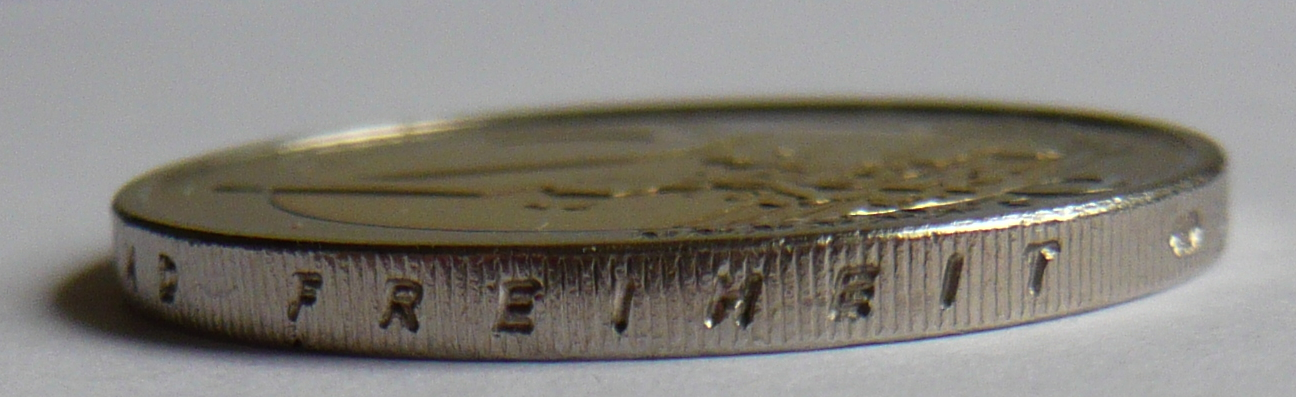
Milled edge of a German 2 euro coin, embossed with Germany's unofficial national motto "Einigkeit und Recht und Freiheit"

In numismatics, reeded edges are often referred to as "ridged" or "grooved" (American usage), or "milled" (British usage). Some coins, such as United States quarters and dimes, 1 euro, Australian 5, 10, 20 cents, 1 and 2 dollars, as well many other current coins, have reeded edges.

One reason for having reeded edges was to prevent counterfeiting. Some gold and silver coins were reeded to discourage clipping, i.e. scraping off the precious metals from the edge of the coin, to maintain its stated value in precious metal. This practice was made more difficult through the implementation of reeding by Isaac Newton in 1698, during his time as warden of the Royal Mint.

Another benefit of certain coins having reeded edges is that it helps people with visual impairment to identify different coin denominations by means of touch alone.

This dual purpose of reeding is sometimes made explicit on the milled edges of coins themselves. For example, many issuances of the British pound coin have historically had their edges inscribed with the Latin phrase 'decus et tutamen', an adaptation from Vergilius' Aeneid meaning 'an ornament and a safeguard'.

== Furniture ==
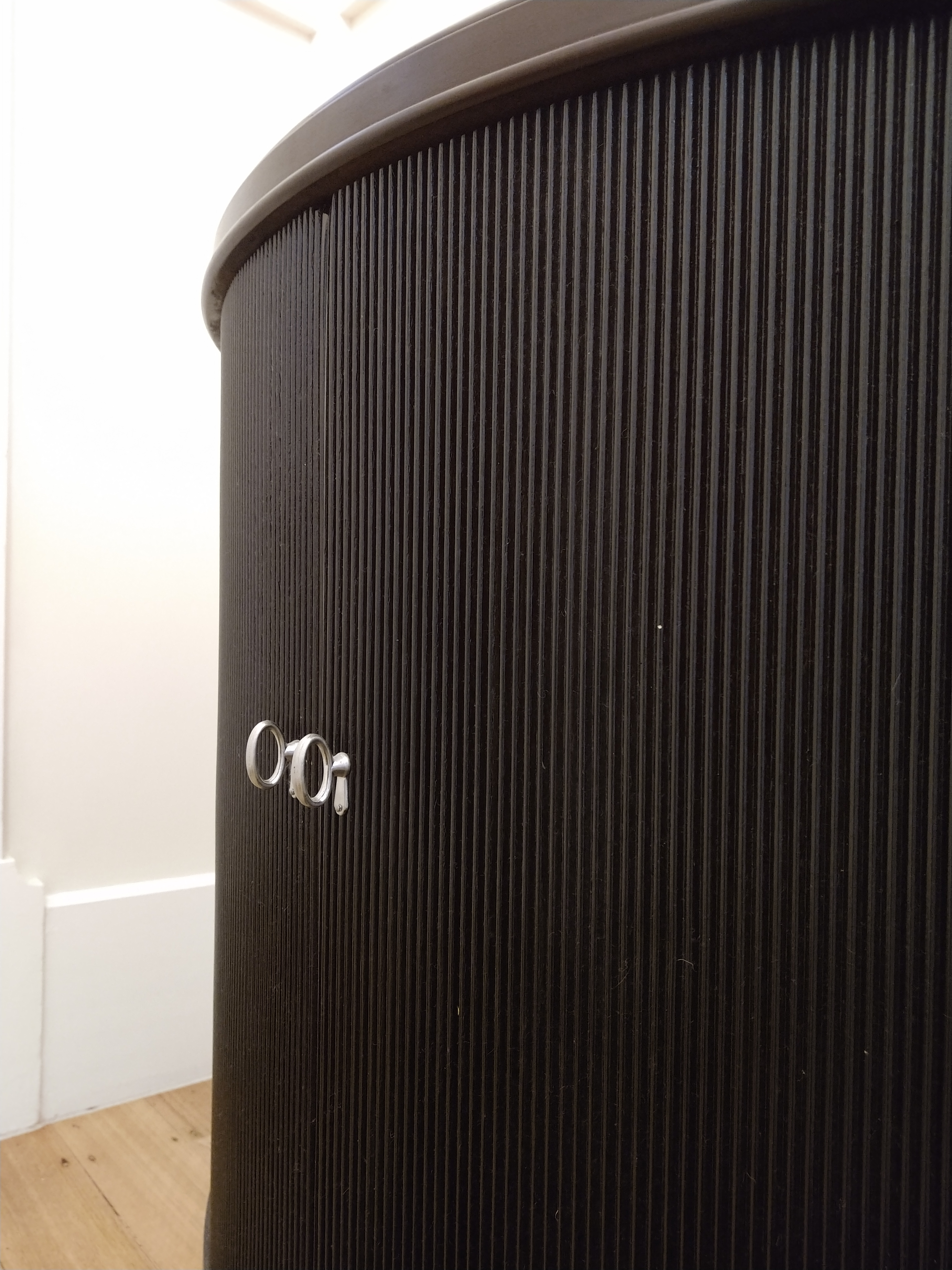
A cabinet with reeded doors

In furniture, reeding is sometimes used around bedposts, and the legs of tables and chairs. Its use in this fashion was inspired by Greek and Roman architectural styles, and is the opposite of fluting.

== Architecture ==
In architecture, reeding is a form of molding usually found on columns, and is sometimes considered to be synonymous with gadrooning.

== See also ==
- Knurling
- Milled coinage
- Spline (mechanical)
