= Jean Varin =

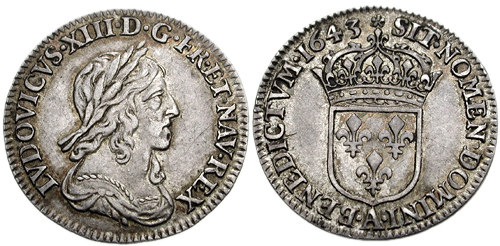
Douzième d'écu de Louis XIII (cinq sols)

Jean Varin or Warin (6 February 1604 Liège – 26 August 1672 Paris) was a French sculptor and engraver who made important innovations in the process of minting coins.

Born in Liège, Varin moved to Paris in 1626. After demonstrating talent as an engraver, he obtained the support of Cardinal Richelieu and in 1647 was appointed head of the French mint. Varin brought back the use of the screw press in the mint, and used it to produce the Louis d'or, a gold coin featuring a portrait of Louis XIII. In 1665, he was made a member of the Académie de peinture et de sculpture.

A screw press

== See also ==
- History of mints
- Aubin Olivier
