= Anna Maria Braun (artist) =

- Born: 1642; Lyon
- Died: 13 August 1713 (aged 70–71); Frankfurt
- Occupation: Sculptor, painter, medalist
- Spouse(s): Johann Bartholomäus Braun
- Parent(s): Georg Pfründt

Anna Maria Braun (1642 – 13 August 1713) was a German wax-modeller and medallist.

She was born Anna Maria Pfründt in Lyon in 1642, daughter of the artist Georg Pfründt. In 1659, she married painter and medallist Johann Bartholomäus Braun. She created portrait reliefs, mythological scenes, and free-standing figures in wax. She worked in Nuremberg and Frankfurt and worked for various royal courts in Germany, the Netherlands, and Austria.

Anna Maria Braun died on 13 August 1713 in Frankfurt.

== Gallery ==
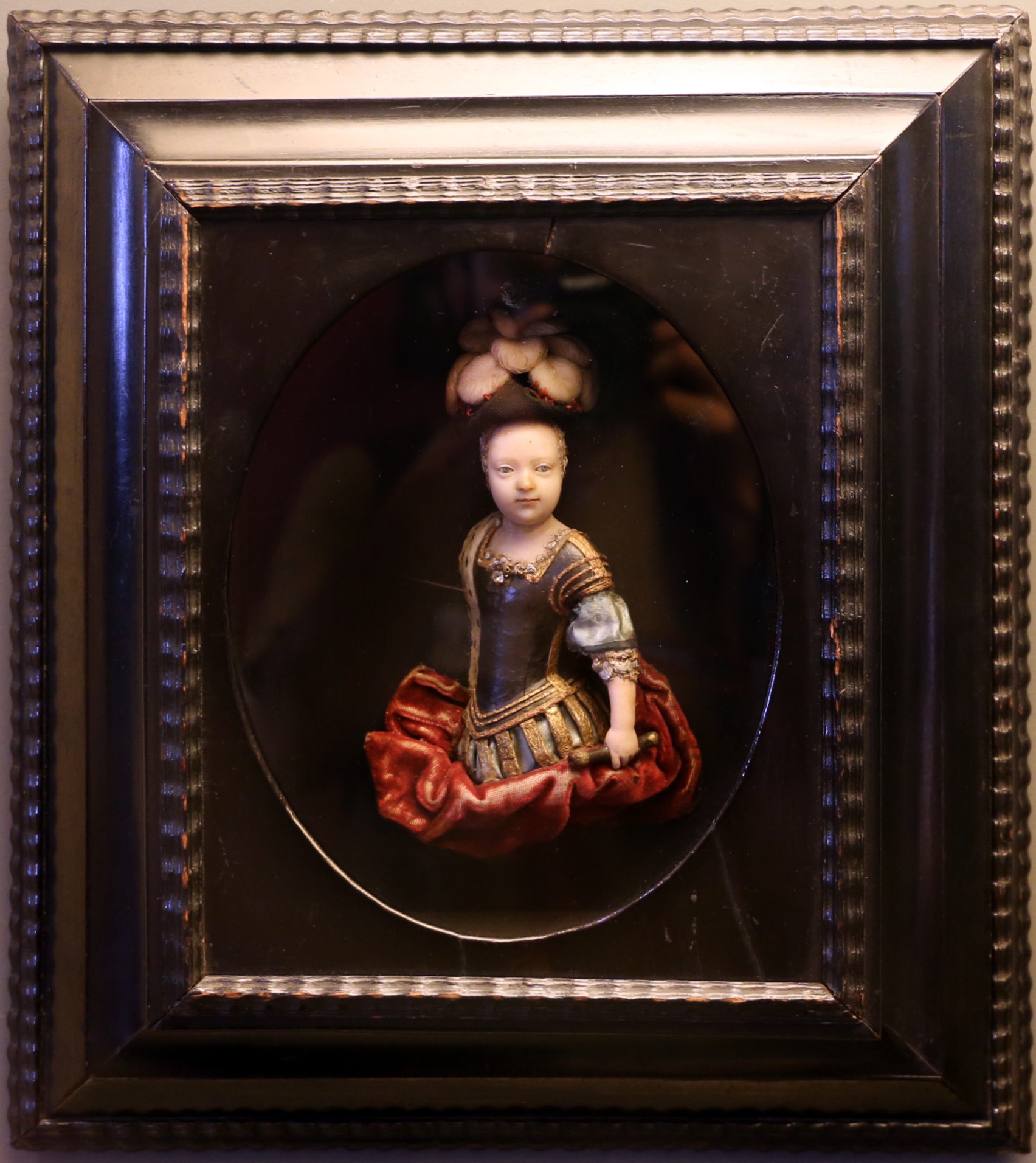
Young Prince

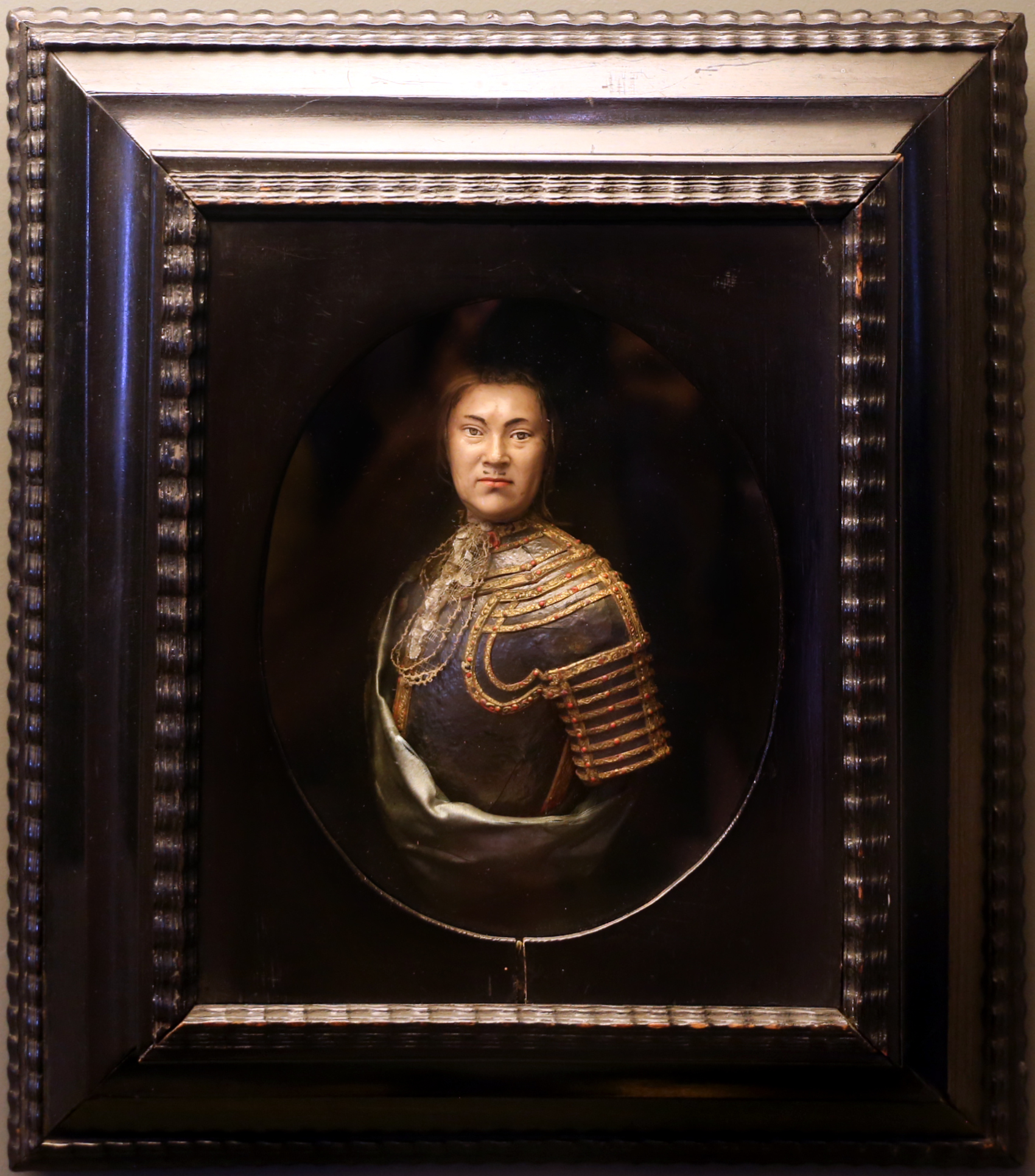
Man in Armor

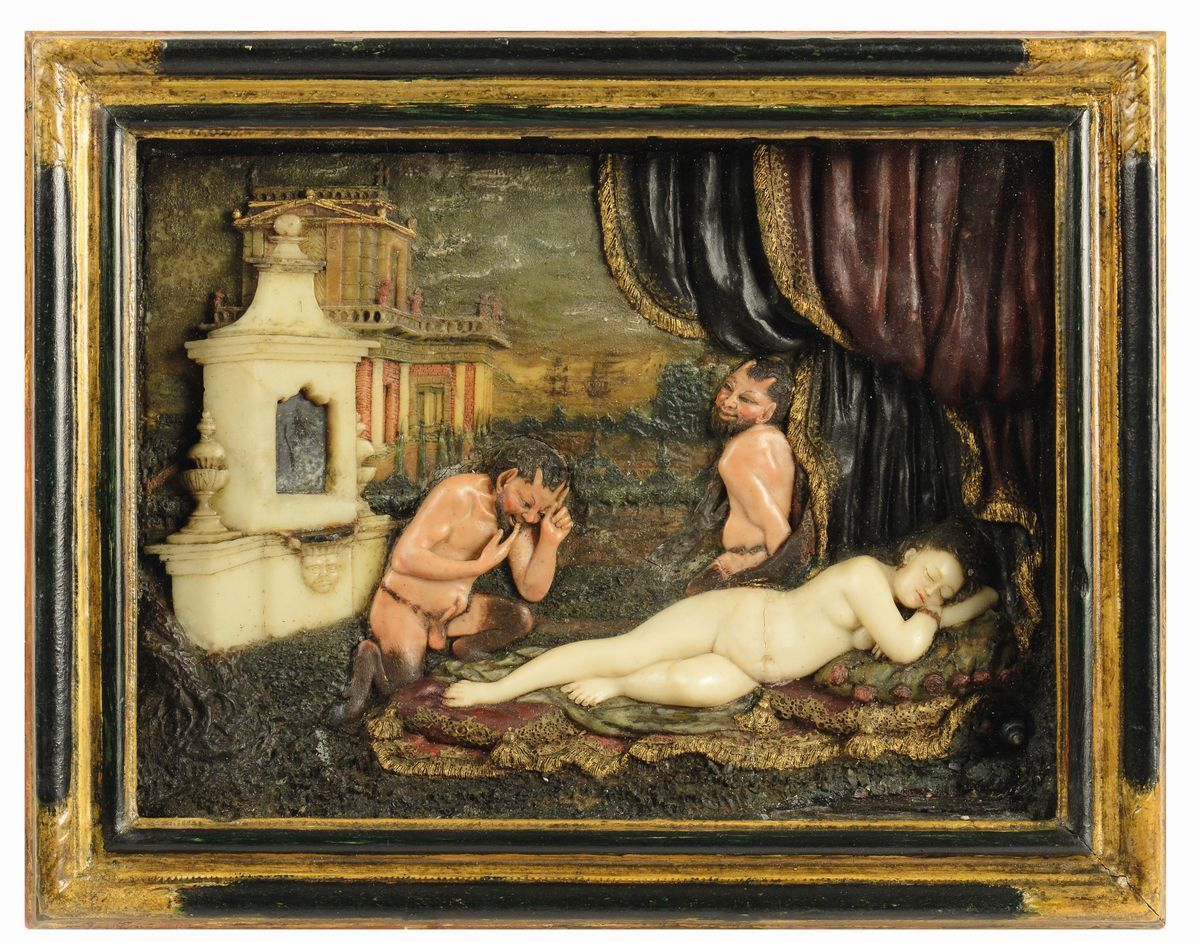
Antiope and Two Satyrs
