= Milled coinage =

Manner of coin production

In numismatics, the term milled coinage (also known as machine-struck coinage) is used to describe coins which are produced by some form of machine, rather than by manually hammering coin blanks between two dies (hammered coinage) or casting coins from dies.

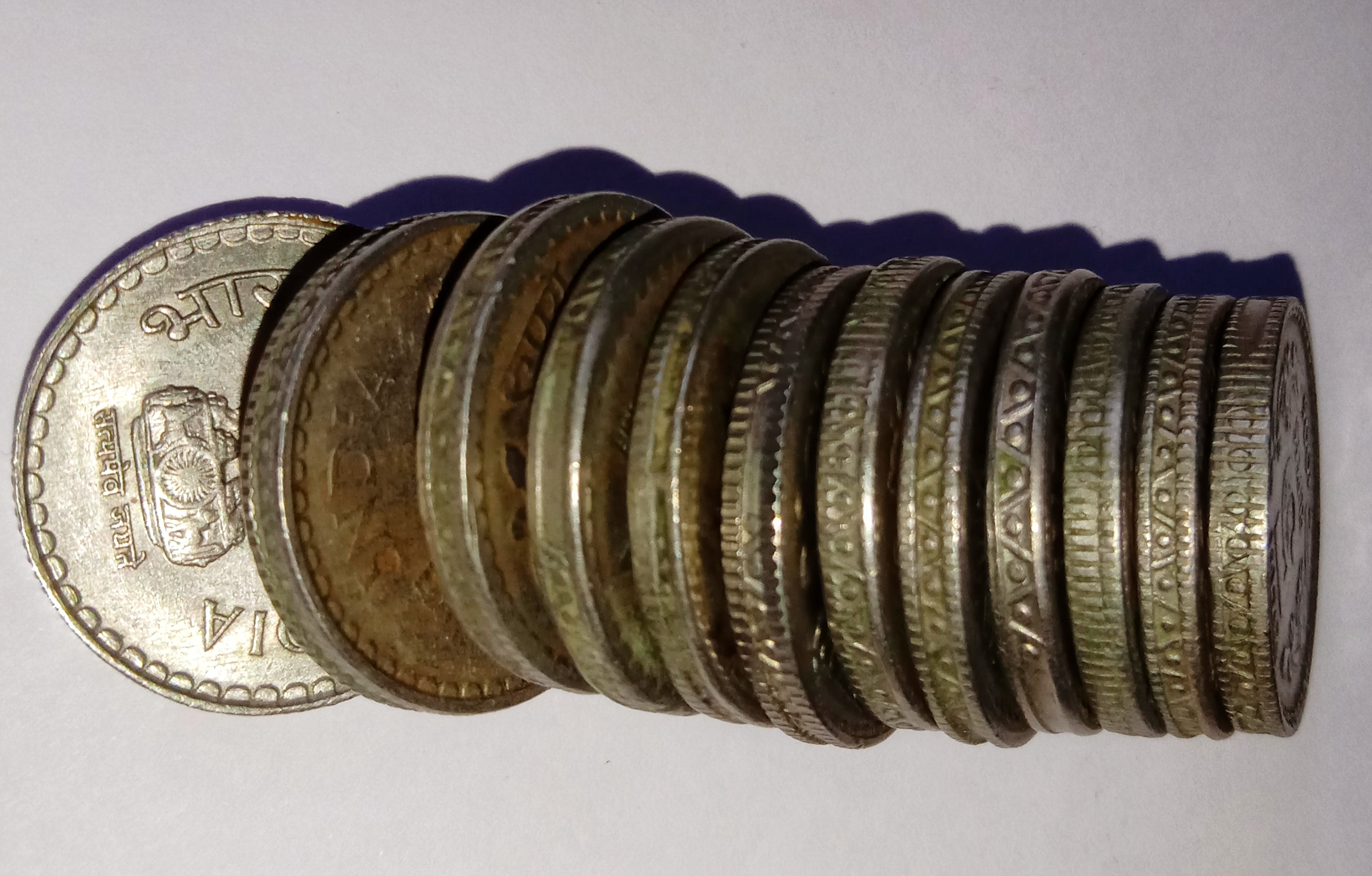
Milled edges of Indian five rupees coins

== Introduction ==
Until 1550, coinage techniques used in European mints had not progressed from the hammered coinage of Ancient Greece. This was problematic because an increase in the supply of bullion from central Europe and America was overworking mints. That led to low quality coins which were easily forged or clipped, i.e. precious metal was shaved from the edges of the coins. In accordance with Gresham's law, the clipped and forged coins drove good coins out of circulation, depreciating the currency.

Leonardo da Vinci's notebooks showed there was a better way and Donato Bramante, the architect who made the initial plans for St. Peter's Basilica, developed a screw press to make the lead bullae attached to Papal documents. In 1550, the French ambassador to Augsburg, Charles de Marillac, saw a way for France to get an economic advantage over the Holy Roman Empire when he learned that a local engineer had perfected a mechanical process of rolling bullion to the required thickness, cutting blanks from the rolled metal, and striking coins from those blanks. This technology was significantly more advanced than the general manufacturing processes of the 16th century making the coins difficult to counterfeit. The negotiations which obtained rights to the process for France were so secret that the inventor was identified with a codename, but he was most likely Marx Schwab. Aubin Olivier went to Augsburg to learn the technique and Henry II of France made him chief engineer of a mechanized mint in Paris, called the Moulin des Étuves, on 27 March 1551. This mint produced well-struck and perfectly round gold and silver coins. Having perfectly round coins made it easy to detect clipping, but the coiners' establishment would have none of this and within a decade the Moulin des Étuves' ex-employees were finding work in Navarre and England.

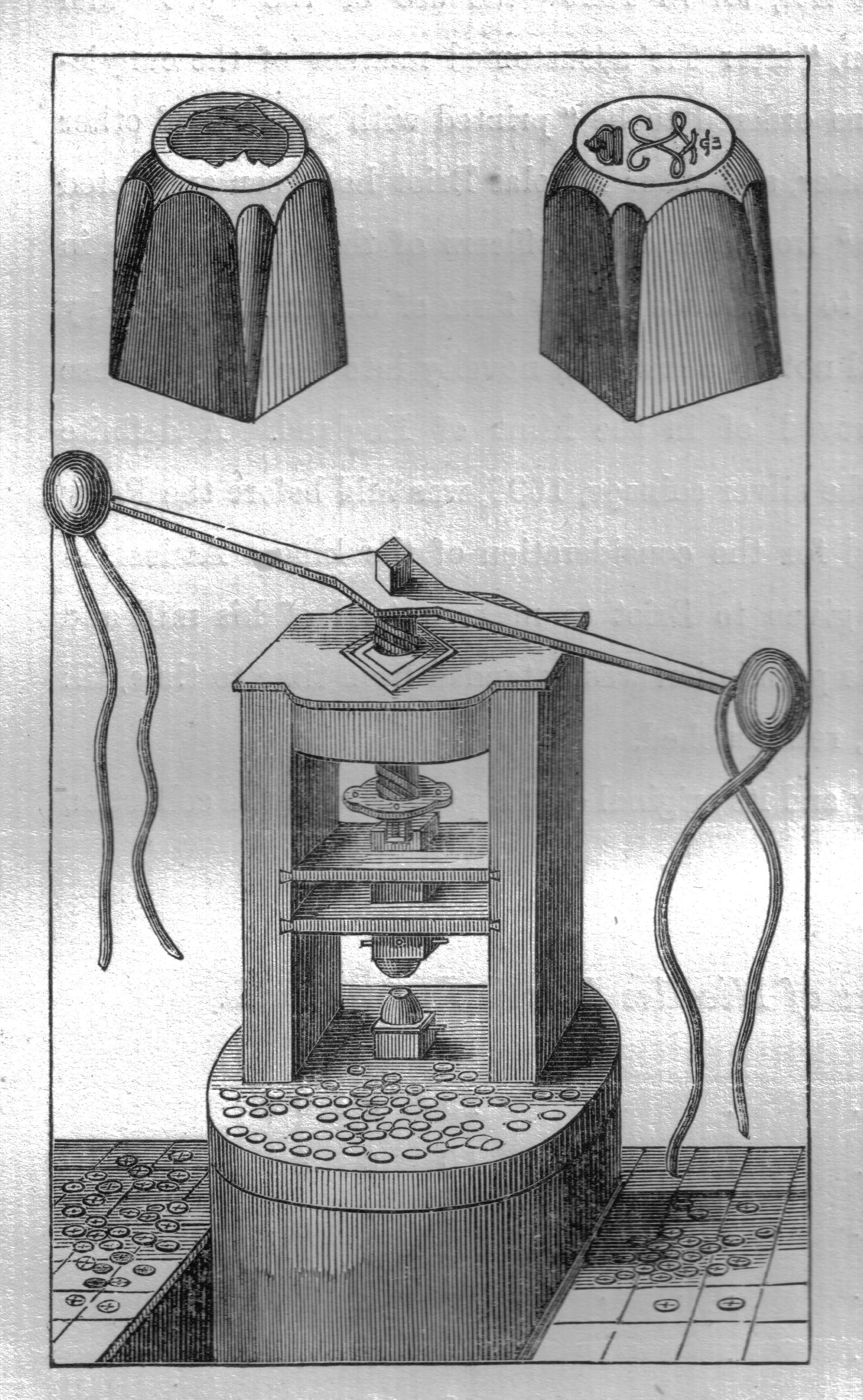
A mill for the production of 'milled' coins with both coin dies illustrated.

In England, a 1560 proclamation of Elizabeth I exchanged old debased coins for new pure coins. The Tower Mint added machinery to its hammering for this "great recoinage". Eloy Mestrelle undertook the technology transfer from France, but when the great recoinage ended, mint authorities found him redundant and in 1578 he was hanged for counterfeiting. In 1632, Charles I employed another French refugee, Nicholas Briot, to improve coinage standards in both England and Scotland, which had its own coinage until 1707, but the English Civil War ended his machine coinage. Yet another Frenchman, Peter Blondeau, provided machinery for a proposed coinage designed by Thomas Simon with Oliver Cromwell's portrait. The restoration of 1660 ended that, but in 1662 Charles II recalled Blondeau to establish a permanent machine-made coinage. He employed a secret process for placing lettering or other designs on the edges of coins. The inscription chosen for the edge—DECVS ET TVTAMEN, meaning an ornament and a safeguard—refers to the protection against clipping which the lettered edge provided. In accordance with Gresham's law, however, the inferior hammered coins limited the circulation of his coins until the hammered coins were demonetized in 1695.

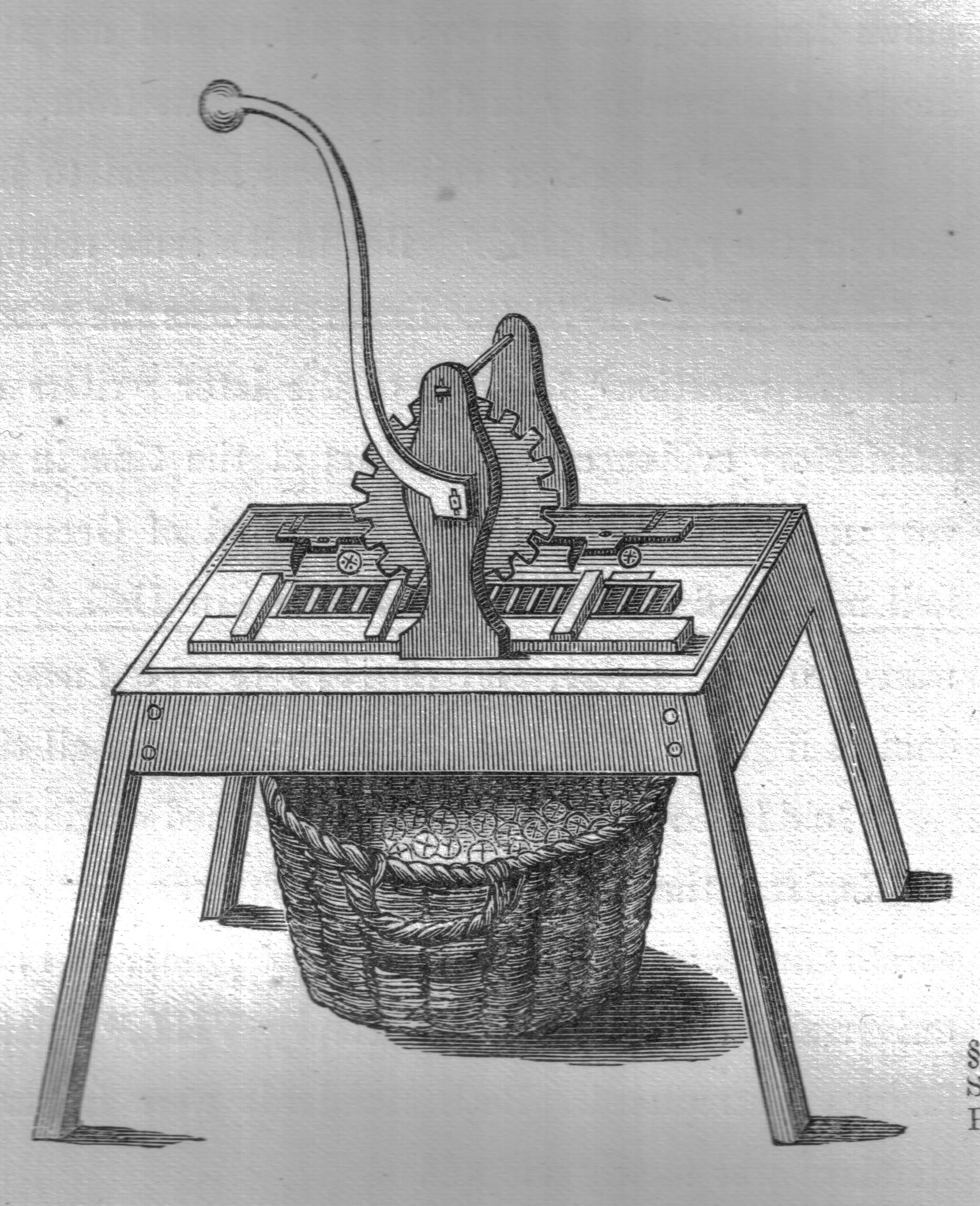
A mill for inscribing or milling the edges of coin flans or planchets.

Closeup of a working reconstruction of a 1571 roller mill in an Austrian museum in Hall

Meanwhile, in continental Europe, France readopted machine made coins in 1639. Both machine-made and hammered coins continued through the recoinage of French silver in 1641, but by now machine-made coinage's time had come, and hammered French coinage ended in 1645. Zürich and Heidelberg experimented with coinage machinery in 1558 and 1567 respectively, and the Hall mint in Tirol permanently adopted coinage machinery in 1567. Unlike the screw press used in France and England, Hall used a roller press. Here two cylindrical dies impressed designs on bullion which rolled between them. Coins were then cut from the rolled and impressed metal. This technique spread from Hall to Cologne in 1568, Dresden in 1574, Kremnica and Danzig in 1577, as well as other small mints. Its most significant impact occurred when Philip II of Spain used his personal funds to build a mint at Segovia which used this technique to convert silver from the Americas to coins efficiently. This allowed the king to pay his debts at a better rate than he otherwise could. The Segovia mint was owned by the King's Royal House; but other Spanish mints, which were run by the National Treasury, continued hammered coinage for decades.

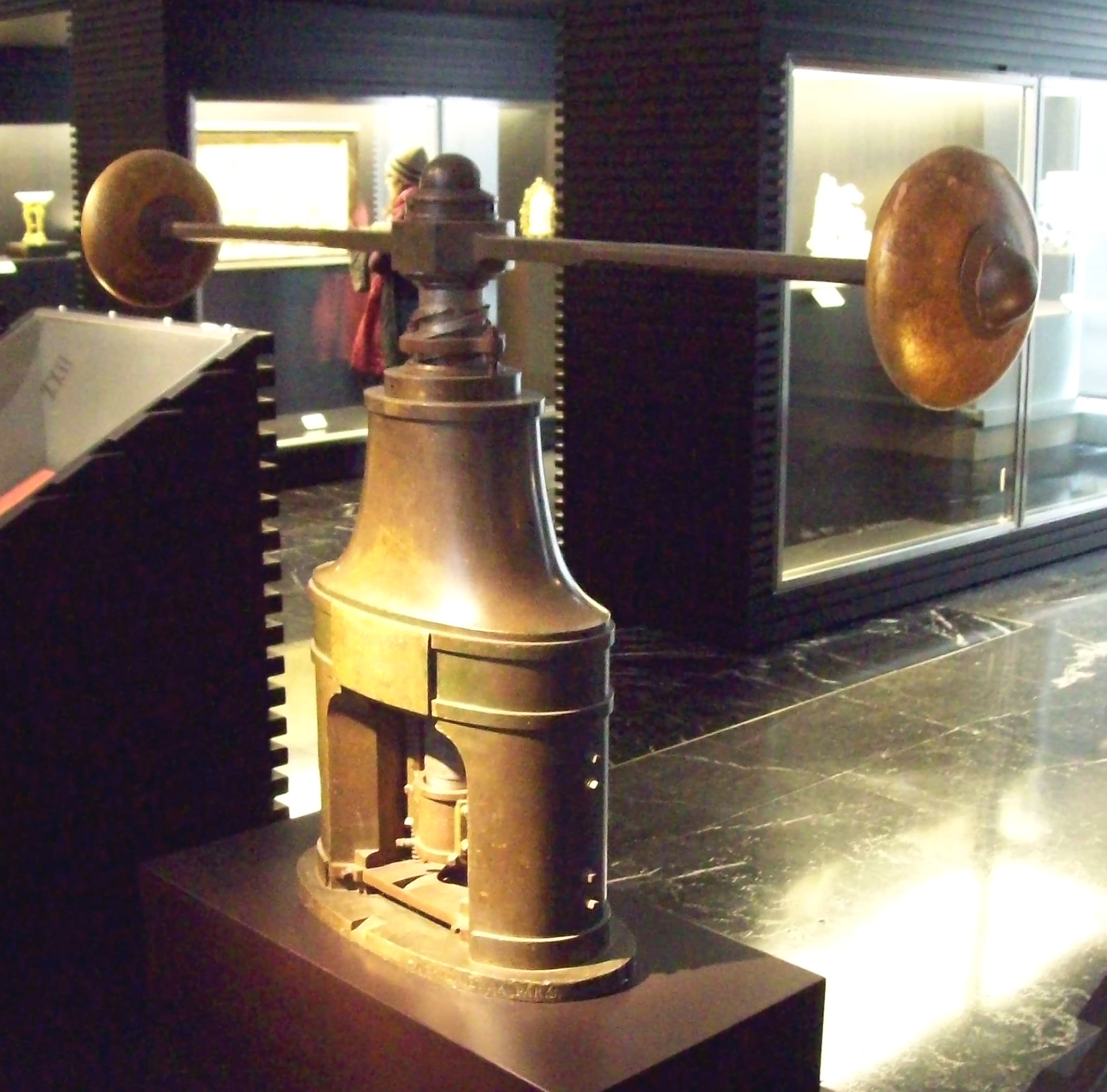
French-made coining press from 1831 (National Archaeological Museum of Spain, Madrid)

== Coins of the Industrial Revolution ==
The Industrial Revolution shifted the focus of the economy from a rural to an urban, money based, enterprise. The main technology of the Industrial Revolution, the Watt steam engine, also increased the overall level of economic activity. Both of these factors increased the demand for money. Factories were financed by introducing paper money and credit, but low-denomination coins were required to pay their workers and in England copper coins were scarce. Matthew Boulton had backed Watt's development of the steam engine, and he used it to power coin-making machinery at his Soho Manufactory. Boulton struck coins for the East India Company, supplied steam powered coining machinery to the Moscow mint, and manufactured private tokens which circulated widely in England. In 1797, Boulton received a contract to strike royal British copper coins called cartwheels. In 1805, he received a further contract to supply steam powered coinage machinery when the British Royal Mint left the Tower of London and established a new facility on Little Tower Hill.

== In the Americas and East Asia ==
When Spain introduced coinage to America in 1536, coins were still hammered. The fineness of the silver in this coinage was reduced in 1732 and the Mexico City mint began striking the new coins using machinery. Other Spanish American mints followed and their thaler size silver coins are widely known as Spanish Milled Dollars. The Spanish Milled Dollar, and its successor the Mexican Peso, were widely used in trade with the Sinosphere, where coins were previously cast. In what is now Vietnam, emperor Minh Mạng introduced a coin based on the Spanish Milled Dollar in 1832. The subsequent French rulers of the area had a coinage based on the Spanish Milled Dollar struck at the Paris mint. Commodore Perry opened Japan to foreign trade, which was mostly paid for in Mexican pesos, in 1853. In 1870, two years after the shogunate was overthrown, the restored Emperor Meiji built a mint at Osaka and imported minting machinery from Birmingham, England for it. Likewise, Spanish Milled Dollars and Mexican pesos became the primary currency used for trade in large parts of southern China during the mid 1800s. China struck similar coins for Turkestan in 1877, and for its own use in 1890.

In modern practice in the United States, milling, or a milled edge, can refer to the raised edge on the coin face, applied by a special milling machine after the planchets are cut out and polished. In addition, the reeding of coins of higher value, applied by the collar holding the coin when it is stamped, can be considered part of the milled edge.

== See also ==
- Mint (facility)
- Reeding, also known as "milling"
