= Peter Blondeau =

- Died: 1672
- Engineering career
- Discipline: Coinage, Engineering
- Employer(s): Royal Mint, Paris Mint
- Significant advance: Reintroduced milled coinage to England; pioneered stamping lettering on coin edges

Peter Blondeau (French: Pierre Blondeau; d. 1672) was a French moneyer and engineer who was appointed Engineer to the Royal Mint and was responsible for reintroducing milled coinage to England. He pioneered the process of stamping lettering onto the edge of coins.

== Career ==
Blondeau was employed by the Paris Mint in the 1640s as engineer, and in 1649 he was invited to work at the Tower Mint in London. The English mint was exploring methods of modernisation, and was willing to try milled coinage again, having briefly flirted with the idea a century earlier with the coinage of Blondeau's countryman Eloy Mestrelle. But despite Blondeau's positive response, it took considerable time for him and his machinery to reach England – the medalist Thomas Simon was sent to Paris to arrange Blondeau's relocation, and perhaps to assist in die engraving, or even to judge the merits of Blondeau and his proposed methods. He encountered piracy en route to England, and upon his arrival was immediately awarded £40 compensation for lost clothes and other personal possessions by the Council of State. He made a proposal to Parliament in June 1650 of how he would like to proceed, and the following year the Mint committee ruled in his favour and allowed him to begin testing - the first test being carried out on 9 May 1651.

The prospect of machine-struck coinage caused uproar amongst the moneyers already employed by the mint, and led to a public battle of pamphlets in which Blondeau set forth the advantages of his machinery and techniques, and those at the Mint denigrated them. The officers of the Mint threatened Blondeau with an indictment of high treason, and accused him of libel and counterfeiting. In an extract from a memorial of the Committee of the Mint, dated January 1652, it is stated

we humbly desire the State that we may file an indictment against the said Peter Blondeau, or that we may have the said Peter Blondeau to run the gauntlet once about the Mint, where if he ever could run it twice, we would give him leave to libel against us all the days of his life afterwards.

The disagreement came to a head when the moneyers claimed they could create more coins, and of better quality, using old machinery lying around the mint, than Blondeau could with his new techniques. Blondeau took up the challenge, and competing against the provost of the moneyers, David Ramage, he produced 300 fine-quality coins to his opponents poorer-quality dozen. But despite his clear victory, the government did not have the money or political will to fund the large scale minting operation proposed by Blondeau, which would have required an outlay of £1,400 on buildings and equipment.

Fortune favoured Blondeau when in 1656 a vast amount of Spanish treasure was captured. He was given part of Worcester House, and later Drury House, for his premises along with £2,000 of captured silver bullion to recoin. Blondeau began to produce coinage in November 1657 and his methods were vindicated. However, while he was striking coins worth a few thousand pounds in total, his rival moneyers were manufacturing coins with a total value of £100,000 with the old methods. Blondeau produced two issues of high quality silver coins, bearing the portrait of Oliver Cromwell, the Lord Protector, who backed Blondeau's methods. However, Cromwell died in September 1658, and without Cromwell's protection against the moneyers Blondeau thought it wise to go back to France. His machinery as well as the older coin presses in the Mint were shipped to Edinburgh three months after the return of Charles II.

Those coins minted immediately after the restoration of the monarchy were hammered in the old style, but these proved unsatisfactory and Blondeau was soon invited back to England. Henry Slingsby, joint master-worker at the mint had developed a great friendship with Blondeau on his first stay, and was the driving force behind his return in 1661. In February 1661 Samuel Pepys remarked upon the poor quality of the new hammered coinage, writing in his diary

we met with Mr. Slingsby, that was formerly a great friend of Mons. Blondeau, who showed me the stamps of the King’s new coyne; which is strange to see, how good they are in the stamp and bad in the money, for lack of skill to make them. But he says Blondeau will shortly come over, and then we shall have it better, and the best in the world.

Blondeau was granted £1,000 to supply all of the machinery required for minting, as well as the machine which would inscribe along the milled edge of the coin the words DECUS ET TUTAMEN, meaning "An ornament and a safeguard", signifying the lettering as having a dual role – embellishing the coin as a piece of design, and making it more difficult for counterfeiters. This technique of infusing lettering onto the edge of coin was improved, if not invented, by Blondeau, and he was the first to apply it in England. Blondeau was granted a 21-year grant as mint engineer, and was promised 3d per lb minted on silver coinage and 12d per lb minted on gold coinage, though no agreement was made with regards to coinage smaller than 6d. He was given the house of John Wallis, the mint weigher, to set up his machinery, as well as several other buildings around the Tower. A grand total of seven coining mills were set up by Blondeau, capable of minting £24,000 worth of coinage per week.

Mechanisation brought the mint's output much higher than it had been previously, though costs also increased significantly. Blondeau worked closely with Thomas Simon and the Roettiers brothers for several years at the mint, and trained a new generation of moneyers who were dependent on him for his patented machinery. Blondeau died in March 1672, and to his good friend Henry Slingsby he left the third-part of his income which was still due to him under his 21-year term as mint engineer, as well as five farthing coin-presses he had brought from Poland.
