= Aubin Olivier =

French engineer

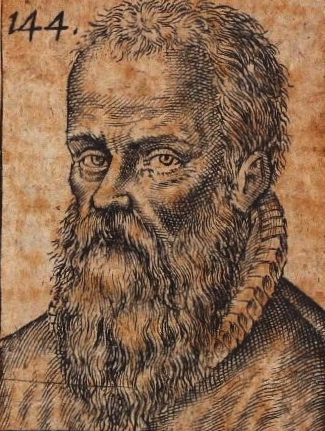
Aubin Olivier, depicted by Léonard Gaultier

Aubin Olivier (fl. 1555) was a French engineer who introduced use of the screw press coin minting technique to France. To reform French coinage, Henri II sent Olivier to investigate press technology being used by an Augsburg goldsmith. Olivier subsequently established the Royal Mill Mint (Monnaie du Moulin des Etuves) on the Île de la Cité in Paris.

== See also ==
- History of mints
- Jean Varin
