= Hammered coinage =

Early method of creating metal currency

Hammered coinage was the most common form of coins produced from the invention of coins in the first millennium BC until the early modern period of c. the 15th–17th centuries, contrasting to the cast coinage and the later developed milled coinage.

== History ==
Hammered coins were produced by placing a blank piece of metal (a planchet or flan) of the correct weight between two dies, and then striking the upper die with a hammer to produce the required image on both sides. The planchet was usually cast from a mold. The bottom die (sometimes called the anvil die) was usually counter sunk in a log or other sturdy surface and was called a pile. One of the minters held the die for the other side (called the trussel), in his hand while it was struck either by himself or an assistant.

Experimental archeology suggests that a lower die could be expected to last for up to 10,000 strikes depending on the level of wear deemed acceptable. Upper dies seem to have a far greater range of lives with usable lives ranging from just over 100 strikes to nearly 8000 being reported. Combining archaeological evidence with historic records suggests ancient coin producers (in this case the Amphictions at Delphi) could get as many as 47,000 strikes out of an individual die.

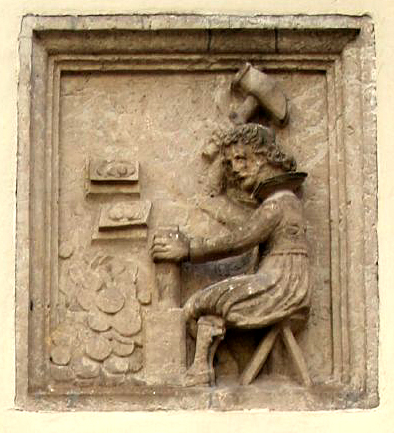
Striking coins: wall relief at Rostock

In later history, in order to increase the production of coins, hammered coins were sometimes produced from strips of metal of the correct thickness, from which the coins were subsequently cut out. Both methods of producing hammered coins meant that it was difficult to produce coins of a regular diameter. Coins were liable to suffer from "clipping" where unscrupulous people would remove slivers of precious metal since it was difficult to determine the correct diameter of the coin.

Coins were also vulnerable to "sweating", which is when silver coins would be placed in a bag that would be vigorously shaken. This would produce silver dust, which could later be removed from the bag.

=== Milled coins ===
The ability to fashion coins from machines (milled coins) caused hammered coins to become gradually obsolete during the 17th century. They were still made in Venice until the 1770s. France became the first country to adopt a full machine-made coin in 1643.

In England, the first non-hammered coins were produced in the reign of Queen Elizabeth I in the 1560s, but while machine-produced coins were experimentally produced at intervals over the next century, the production of hammered coins did not finally end until 1662.

=== Cast coins ===
An alternative method of producing early coins, particularly found in Asia, especially in China, was to cast coins using molds. This method of coin production continued in China into the nineteenth century. Up to a couple of dozen coins could be produced at one time from a single mold, when a 'tree' of coins (which often contained features such as a square hole in the center) would be produced and the individual coins (called cash) would then be broken off.

== Hammered coin production ==
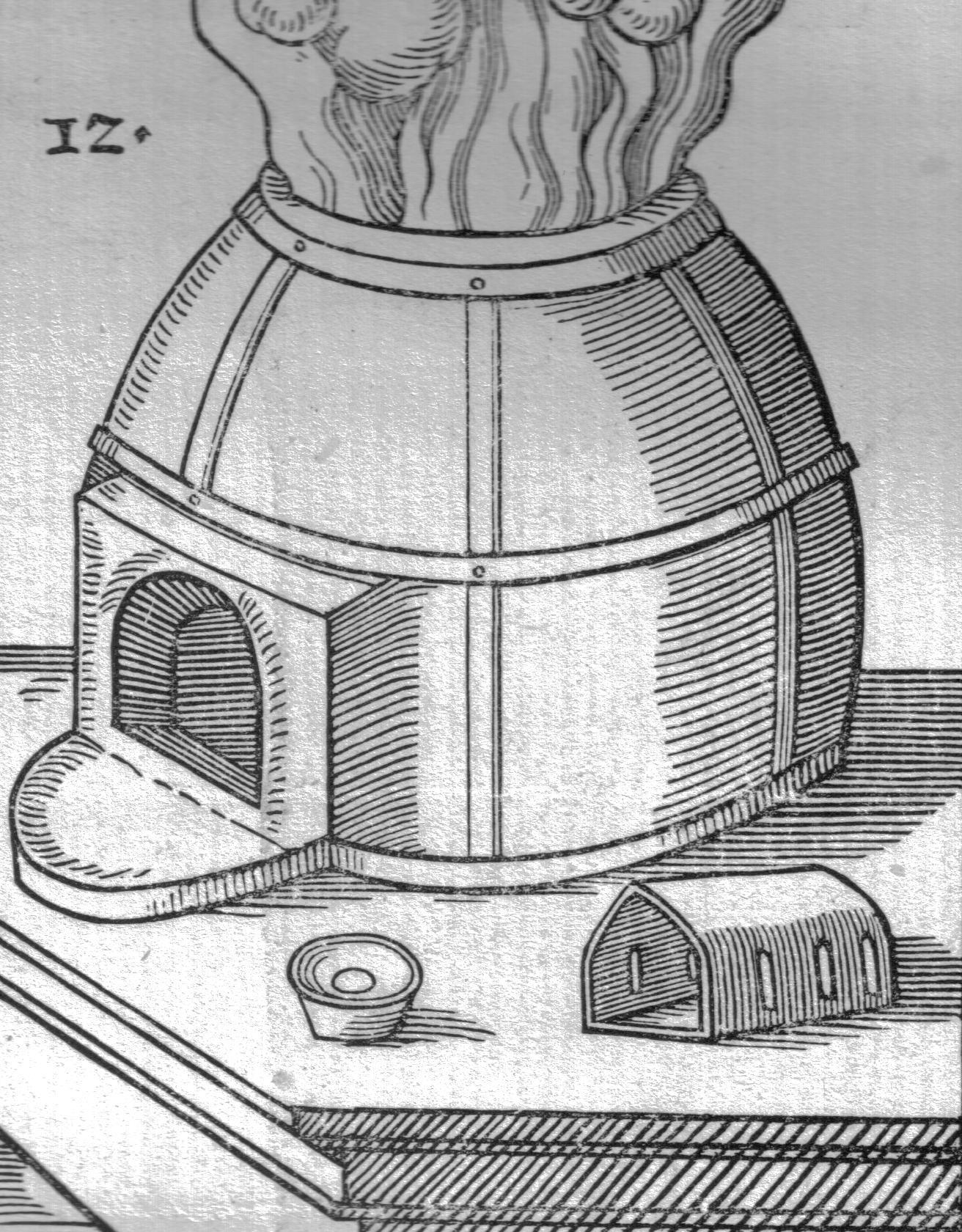
A furnace for producing molten metal for coin production.

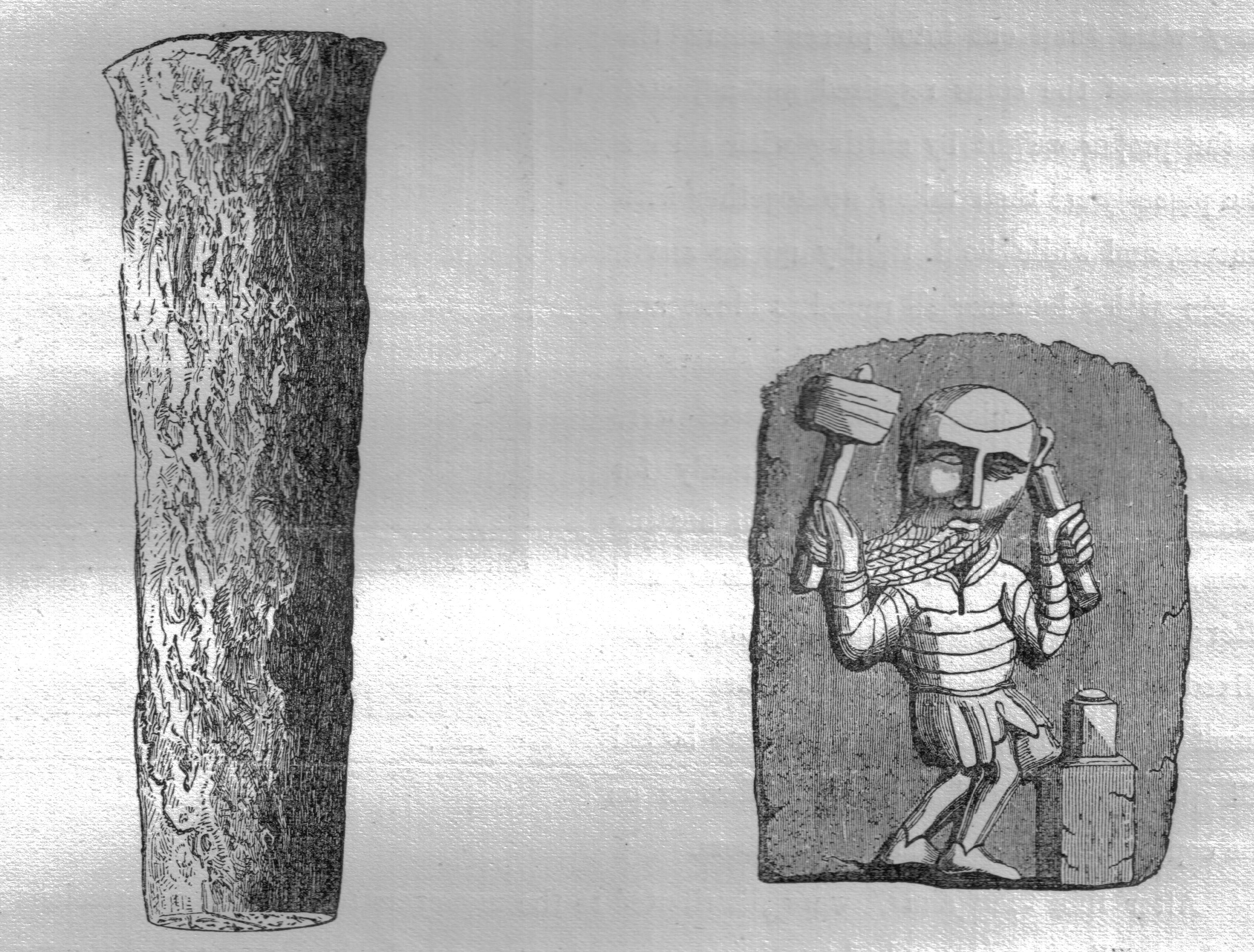
A trussell for use with a pile in the production of hammered coins as shown by the moneyer at work.

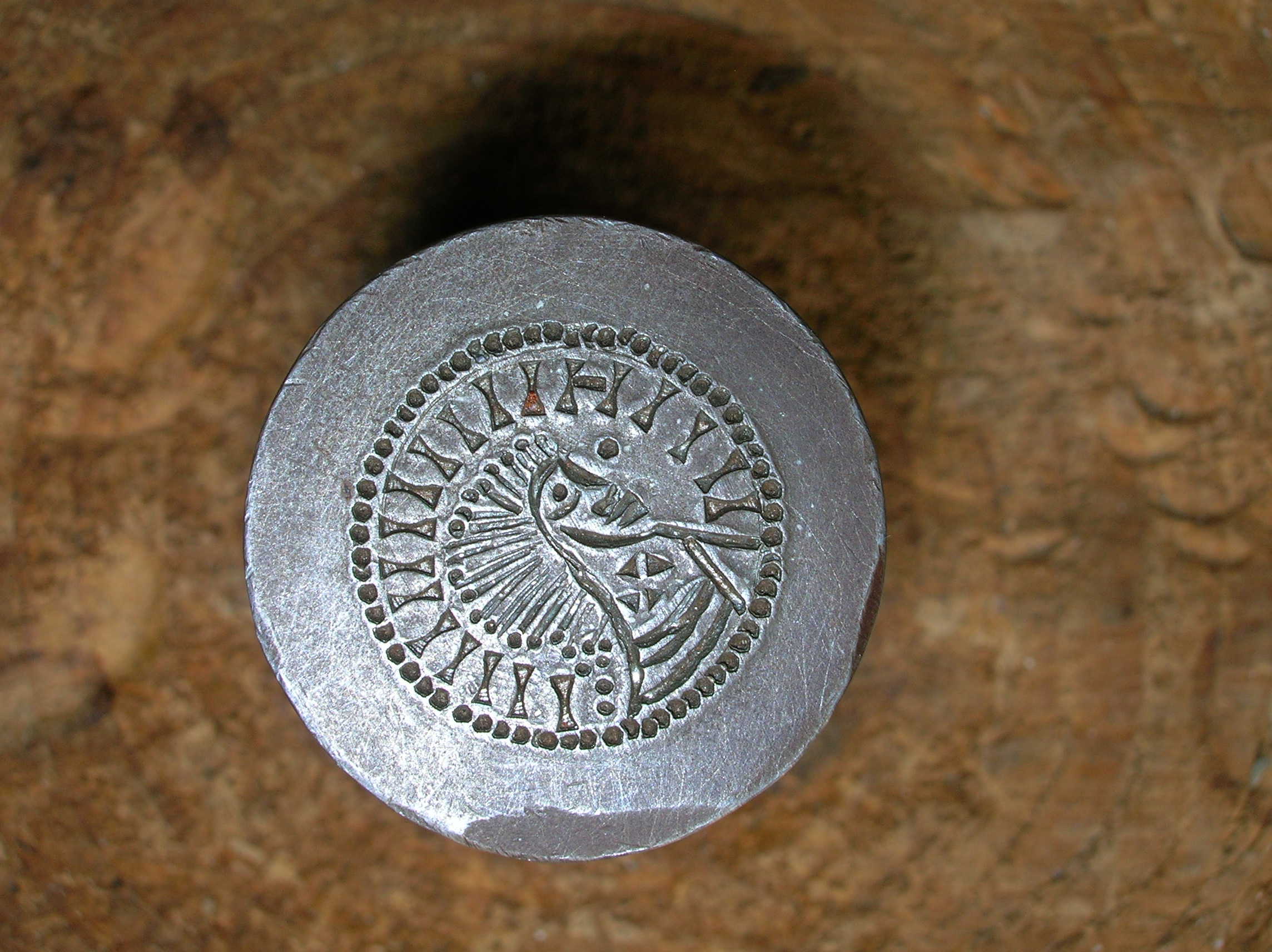
An anvil die used for minting hammered coins.

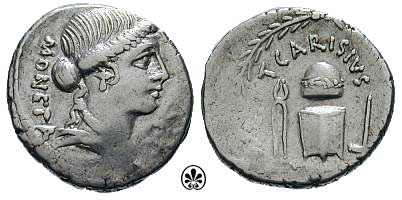
Roman Denarius issued by T. Carisius (46BCE) showing the moneyer's anvil, hammer and tongs. The object above the anvil may be the die (trussel) or a leather cap.

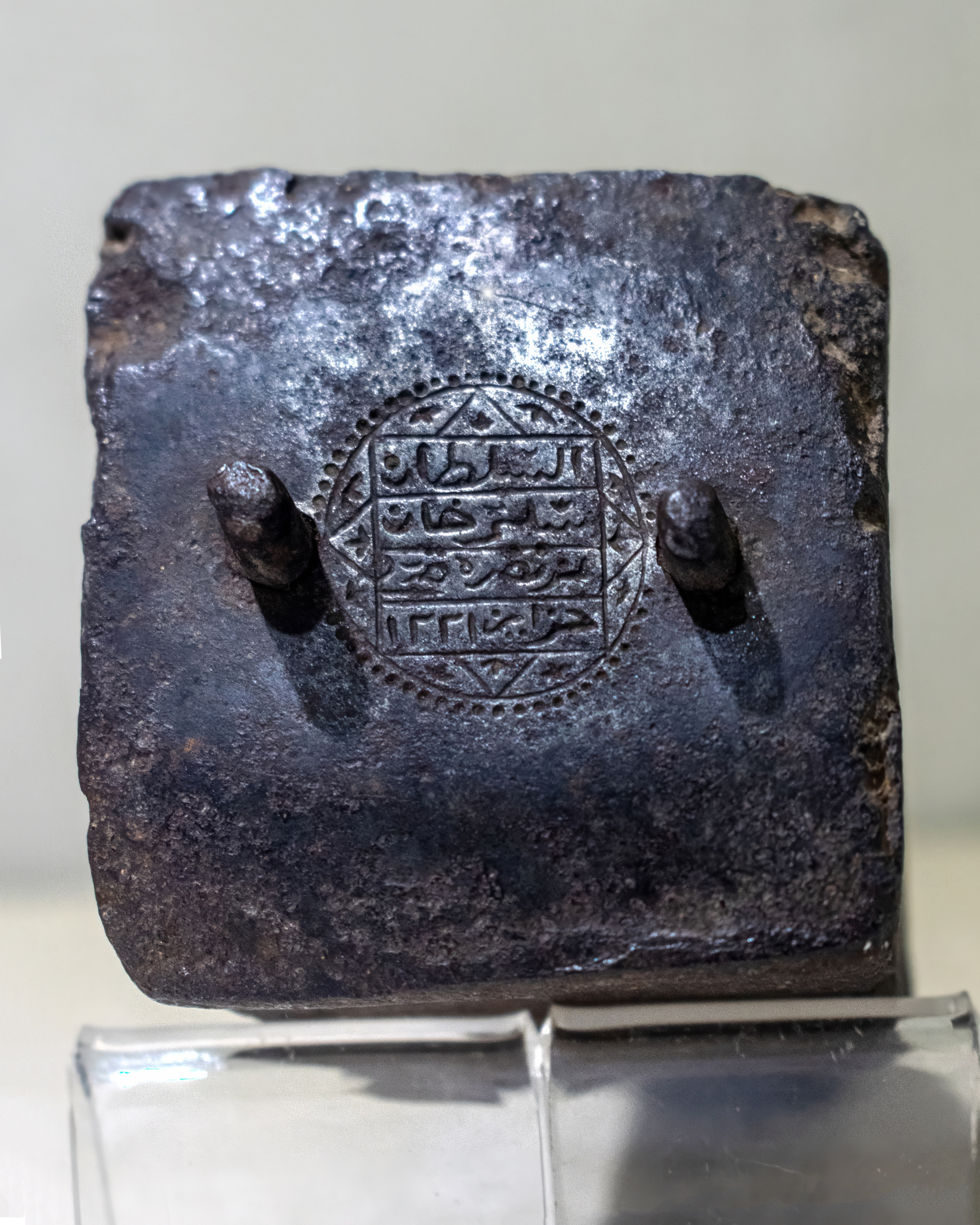
Coin striking mold, Algiers, Ottoman period

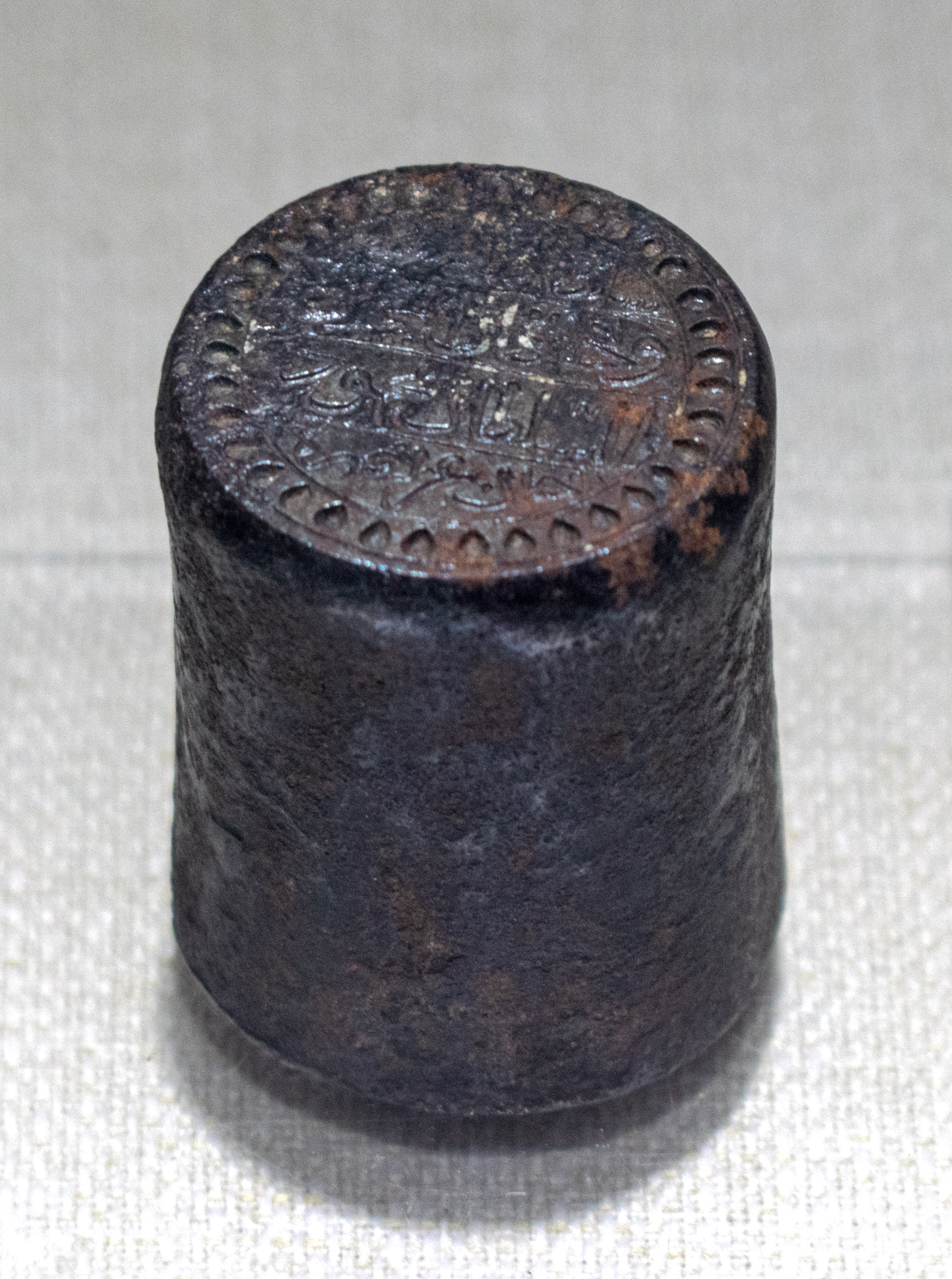
Coin die, Algiers, Ottoman period

== See also ==
- Milled coinage
