= History of the English penny (1485–1603) =

British currency

The history of the English penny from 1485 to 1603 covers the period of the House of Tudor up to the death of Elizabeth I without an heir. The Tudor era saw the debasement of the penny under Henry VIII and Edward VI, with Elizabeth I's reign overseeing the recovery of the silver quality. Under the Tudors, the penny decreased in size.

== The Tudors (1485–1603) ==
=== Henry VII ===
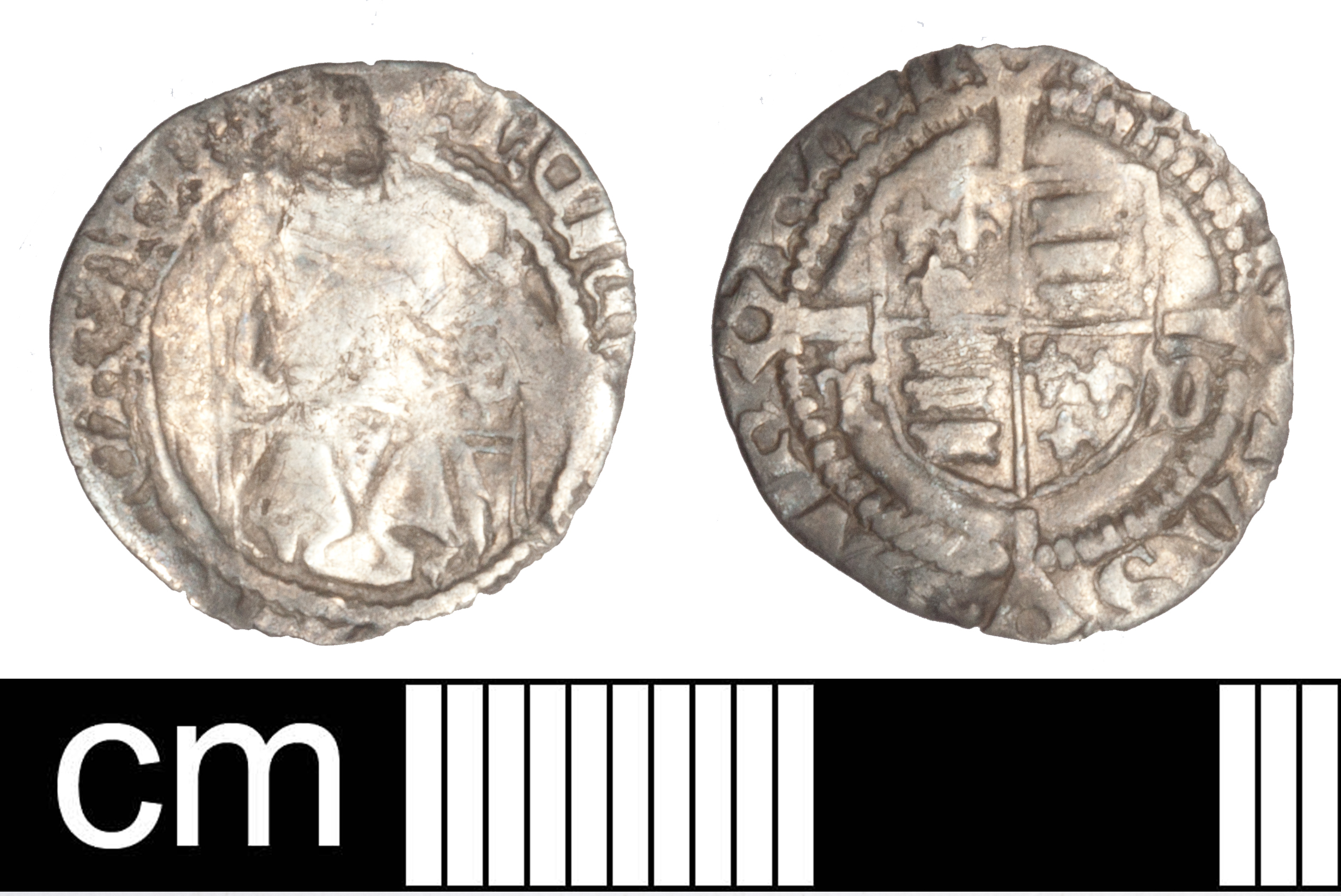
Silver penny of Henry VII.

Henry Tudor, who reigned as King Henry VII between 1485 and 1509, had a tenuous claim on the throne, being the Lancastrian claimant via an illegitimate descendant of Edward III when all the senior candidates had been killed off in the Wars of the Roses. He concluded the wars with his victory at the Battle of Bosworth Field in 1485. Subsequently, He consolidated his power through various means, including his marriage to Elizabeth of York, which united the two warring dynasties. Henry VII's reign was marked by pretenders' claims to the throne, whose existence resulted from the king's initially insecure grasp of power; Henry could subdue each of the attempted usurpers without particular difficulty. The whole style of Henry's coinage marked a break with what had gone before — the king's bust became more lifelike, and the shields on the reverse became much more detailed. Henry's first coinage is very like that of Henry V and Henry VI, minted at London, Canterbury, Durham, and York. The inscription was one of a variety of HENRIC DI GRA REX ANG — Henry by the grace of God King of England. Henry introduced what is known as the "Sovereign coinage", so called because the king is depicted seated on a throne, while the reverse shows the royal shield over a cross. The issue is regarded as marking the division between the coins of the Middle Ages and of the Renaissance in England. The Sovereign coinage was minted at London, Durham, and York, and inscribed with one of a variety of HENRICUS DI GRA REX ANG.

=== Henry VIII ===
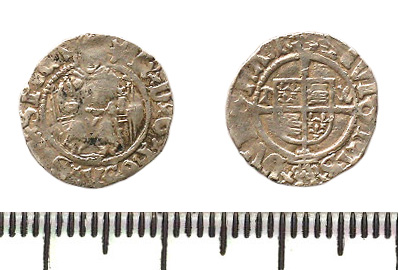
Silver penny of Henry VIII.

Henry's first coinage, to 1526, resembled that of his father and still used his father's portrait. With higher bullion prices on Europe, the weight of the silver coins was reduced again. Pennies were minted at the London, Canterbury, and Durham mints. With the reformation starting in the 1530s, the principal effect as far as the coinage; the closure of the ecclesiastical mints of Canterbury, Durham and York — in future all mints would be Royal mints, under the control of the crown who would consequently get all the revenue. The second coinage, from 1526 to 1544 had a completely different inscription, H.D.G. ROSA SIE SPIA — Henry by the grace of God a rose without a thorn. At this time the pound standard for mintage was changed from the local Tower pound to the internationally known troy pound. The value of a pennyweight increased from 1.46 grams to 1.56 grams. The coins were minted at London, Canterbury, Durham, and York ecclesiastical mints.

The dissolution of the monasteries in the 1530s and the ratification of the First Act of Supremacy in 1534 resulted in a financial bonus for the king. By 1544, Henry was running short of money, partially to his extravagant lifestyle and expenditure. Henry's solution was to drastically lower the fineness of the third coinage (1544 to 1547) to only one-third silver and two-thirds copper. This was understandably unpopular with the people, resulting in Henry acquiring the nickname "Old Coppernose" as the silver rubbed off the high-relief part of the coin design. By this time, there were two mints in London, at the Tower and in Southwark, and both of them, together with mints in Bristol, Canterbury, and York produced the debased coinage which bore the inscription H.D.G. ROSA SINE SPINA.

=== Edward VI ===
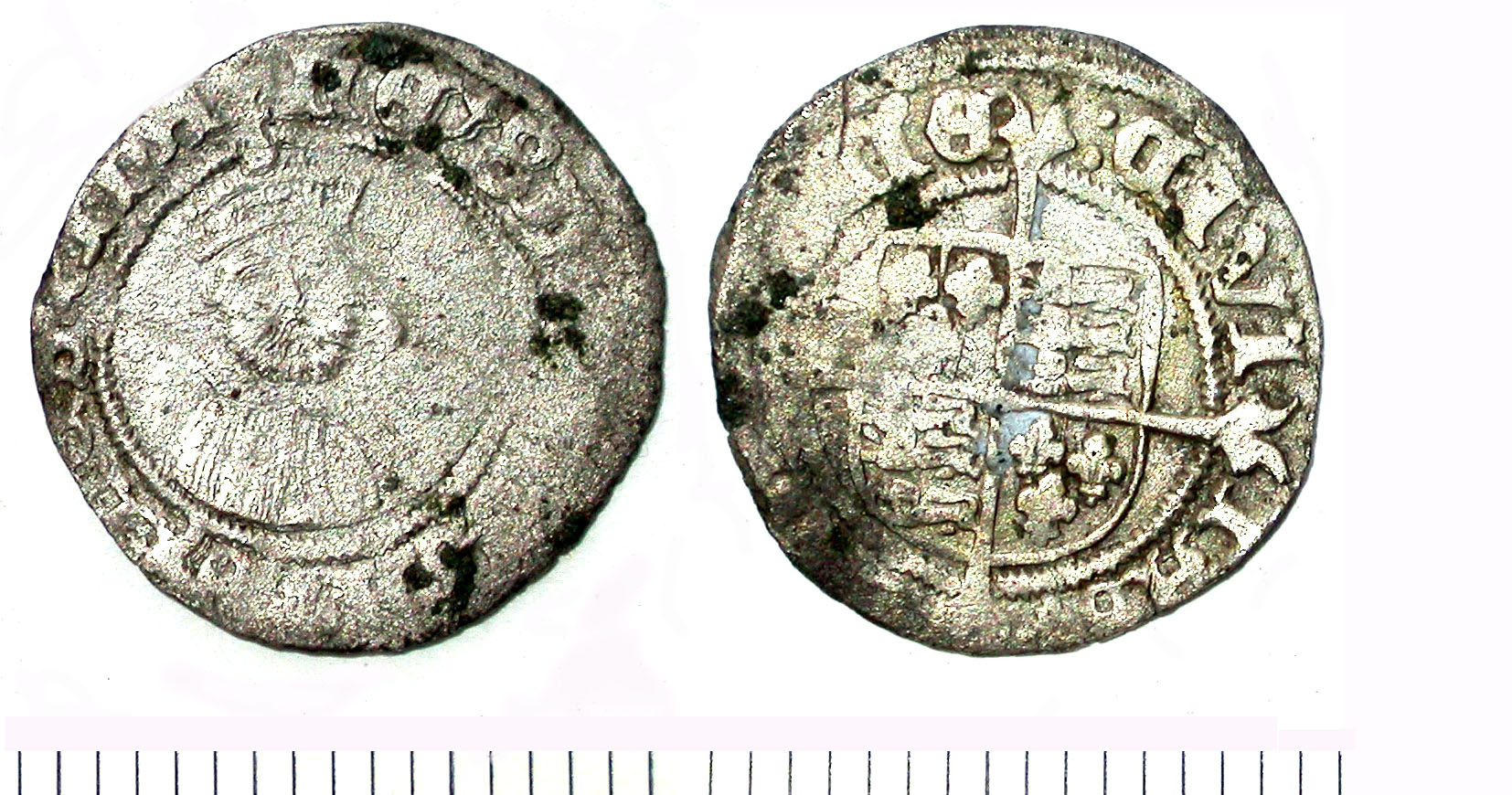
Silver penny of Edward VI.

The debased coinage caused rampant inflation when Henry VIII died in 1547. He left behind the Country with Edward VI that contained religious turmoil and economic unrest. The influx of silver and gold from Central and South America into Spain and to the rest of Europe was destabilising the price of bullion and worsening the situation.

Until 1551, what is known as the posthumous coinage was produced — the coins were exactly the same as Henry's last issue, but with a different portrait of him. Inflation over the last thirty years had made the penny much less important for the next few reigns. The reign of Edward VI (1547 to 1553) was numismatically important for seeing the introduction of new denominations — the silver crown, half crown, shilling, Sixpence, and Threepence — which were to survive until 1971, and were a reflection of the increasing wealth of the country. The new coins were struck in silver, with the aim of revitalising the economy. Edward VI's pennies, were made using debased metal at the Tower, Southwark, Bristol and York, with the inscription E.D.G. ROSA SINE SPINA — Edward by the grace of God a rose without a thorn.

=== Mary I ===
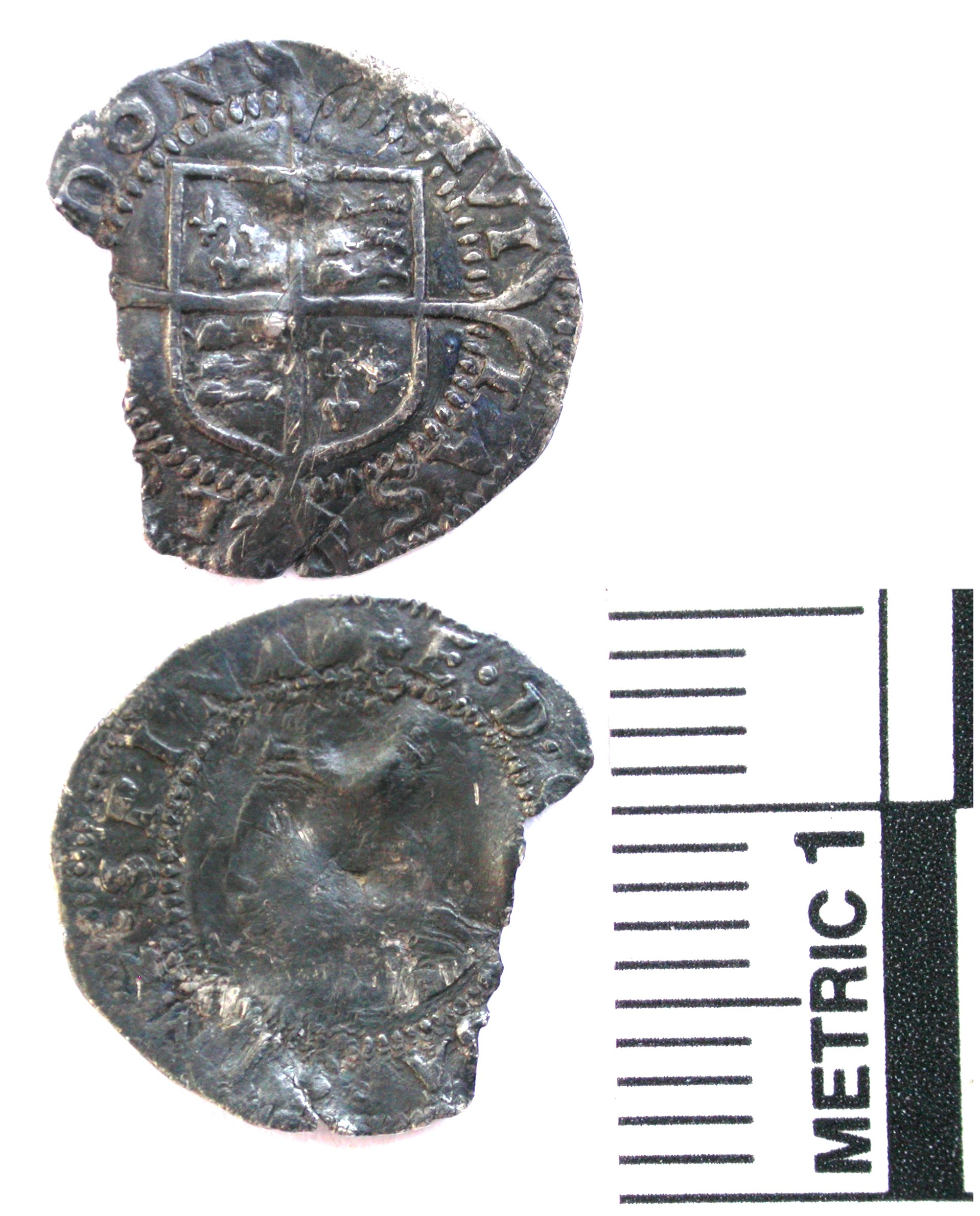
Silver penny of Mary and Philip.

In 1553, Edward VI died and was succeeded — after the nine-day rule of Lady Jane Grey — by his older sister, the strongly Catholic Queen Mary I. Pennies of Her first year, bearing her head alone with the inscription M.D.G. ROSA SINE SPINA — Mary by the grace of God a rose without a thorn — are rare. In 1554, she married Philip, the Prince of Spain, and put his portrait on the coinage and her own. Both silver and base metal pennies of Mary I's reign were issued from the Tower mint, with the legend P Z M D G ROSA SINE SPINA — Philip and Mary by the grace of God a rose without a thorn.

=== Elizabeth I ===
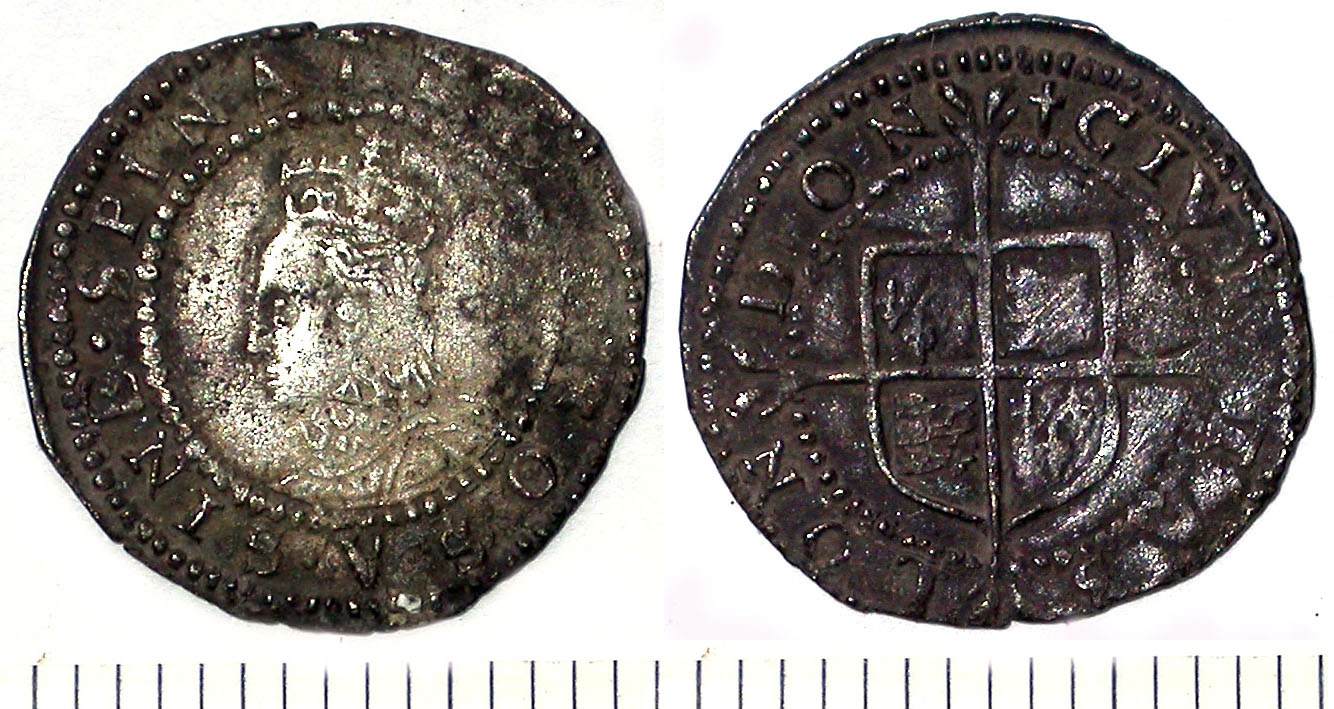
Silver penny of Elizabeth I.

When Elizabeth I ascended the throne in 1558, England was an impoverished country, in religious turmoil, and with a coinage that was in a poor state after Henry VIII's debasement, since when little had been done to improve the quantity or quality of the coins in circulation. The coinage system as whole, needed a reform, and Elizabeth set about doing this. Throughout her reign, large quantities of gold and silver coins of many denominations were produced (the gold and silver often being obtained by raiding Spanish shipping); of the silver denominations produced the shilling and sixpence were most important, but small denomination coins — groats, threepences, half-groats, three-halfpence, pennies, three-farthings, and halfpennies — were also struck and were very popular with merchants and small traders.

For the first time in England milled, or machine-produced, coins were produced by Eloye Mestrelle, an ex-employee of the Paris mint, between 1560 and 1572. Still, while the milled issue was fairly successful, there was controversy towards Mestrelle by other employees of the Tower mint who feared for their jobs, leading to his dismissal. No milled pennies were produced, as they would probably have been too small to be mechanically produced by the equipment of the time. Some of Elizabeth's coins were dated for the first time.

Elizabethan pennies are very small, and are often found creased or bent. The obverse bears the legend E D G ROSA SINE SPINA — Elizabeth by the grace of God a rose without a thorn — around a left-facing bust of the queen, while the reverse bears the legend CIVITAS LONDON — City of London. All pennies were minted at the Tower mint in London.
