= Penny (English coin) =

Coin introduced in England c. 785

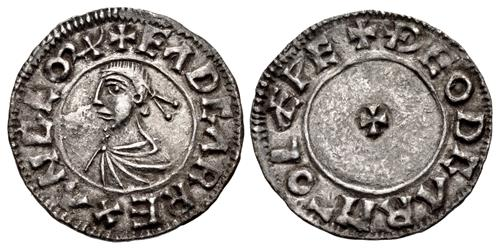
Silver 'reform' penny of Edgar I of England, Lewes mint, c. 973–975.

The English penny (plural "pence"), originally a coin of 1.3 to 1.5 grams (0.042 to 0.048 troy ounces; 0.046 to 0.053 ounces) pure silver, was introduced c. 785 by King Offa of Mercia. These coins were similar in size and weight to the continental deniers of the period and to the Anglo-Saxon sceats which had preceded it.

Throughout the period of the Kingdom of England, from its beginnings in the 9th century, the penny was produced in silver. Pennies of the same nominal value, 1/240 of a pound sterling, were in circulation continuously until the creation of the Kingdom of Great Britain in 1707.

== Idioms ==
Due to their ubiquity pennies have accumulated a great number of idioms to their name usually recognizing them for their commonality and minuscule value. These might include:

- worth every penny
- penny-pincher
- penny-wise and pound-foolish
- not have two pennies to rub together
- cut (one) off without a penny
- mean enough to steal a penny off a dead man's eyes
- spend a penny

== History ==
Anglo-Saxon silver pennies were the currency used to pay the Danegeld, essentially protection money paid to the Vikings so that they would go away and not ravage the land. As an illustration of how heavy a burden the Danegeld was, more Anglo-Saxon pennies from the decades around the first millennium have been found in Denmark than in England. In the reign of Ethelred the Unready (978–1016), some 40 million pennies were paid to the Danes, while King Canute (Knut) (1016–1035) paid off his invasion army with another 20 million pennies. This adds up to about 2,800,000 troy ounces (87 tonnes; 96 short tons) of silver, equivalent to £250,000 at the time, and worth about £10 million in 2005 money (its purchasing power at that time may have exceeded £100 million and may have been as high as £1 billion in 2005).

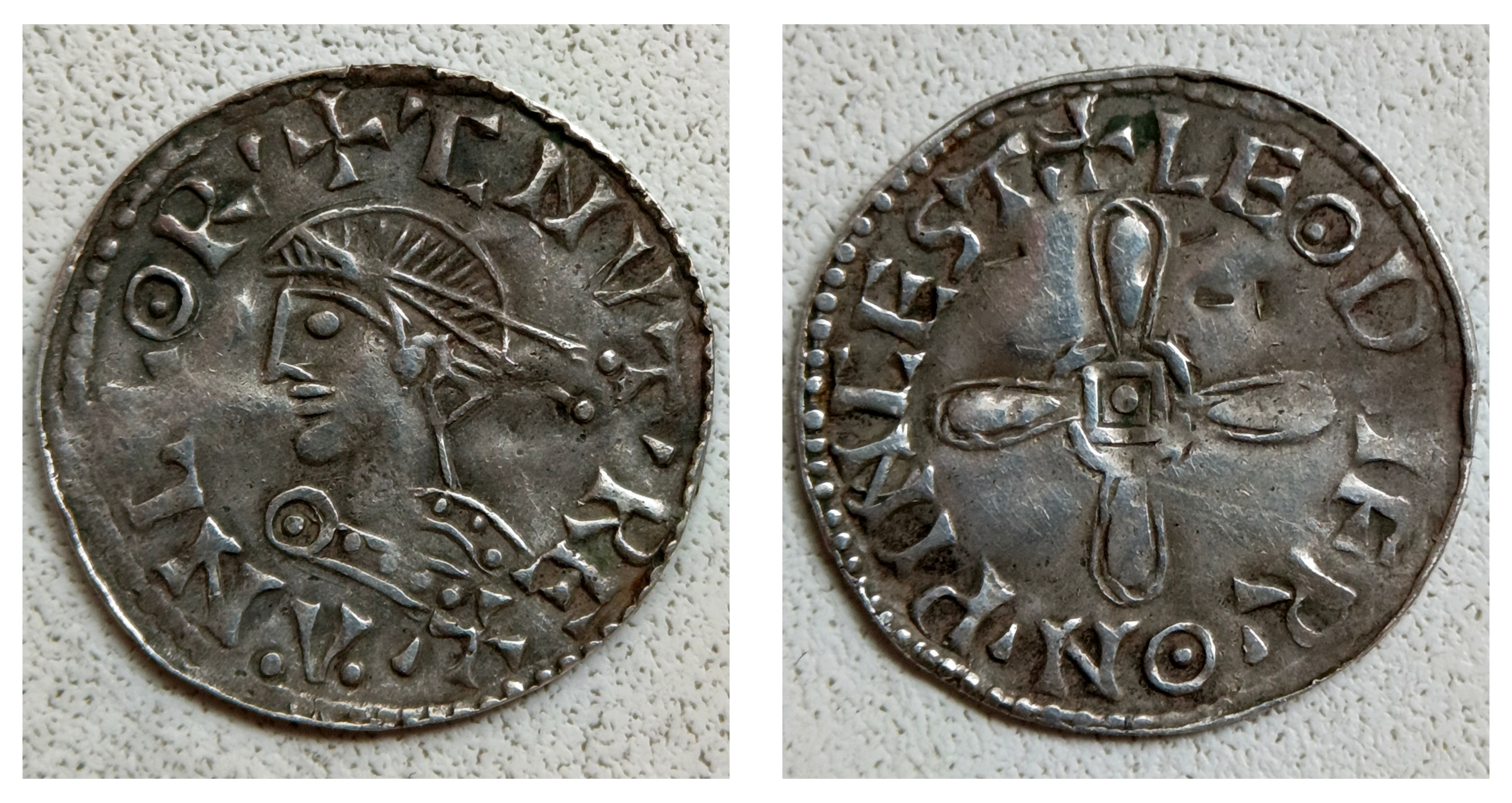
Penny - Cnut (1016 - 1035), posthumous issue. Moneyer: Leodmer. Mint: Winchester, England.

The penny initially weighed 20 to 22.5 modern grains (1.3 to 1.5 g). It was standardized to 32 Tower grains, 1/240 of a Tower pound (approx. 350 g). The alloy was set to sterling silver of .925 fineness in 1158 under King Henry II. The weight standard was changed to the Troy pound (373.242 g) in 1527 under Henry VIII, i.e. a pennyweight became about 1.555 grams. As the purity and weight of the coin was critical, the name of the moneyer who manufactured the coin, and at which mint, often appeared on the reverse side of the coin.

From the time of King Offa, the penny was the only denomination of coin minted in England for 500 years, until the attempted gold coinage issue of King Henry III in 1257 and a few halfpennies and farthings in 1222, the introduction of the groat by King Edward I in 1279, under whom the halfpenny and farthing were also reintroduced, and the later issues of King Edward III.

At the time of the 1702 London Mint Assay by Sir Isaac Newton, the silver content of British coinage was defined to be one troy ounce of sterling silver for 62 pence, or 502 mg per penny. Therefore, the value of the monetary pound sterling was equivalent to only 3.87 troy ounces (120 g) of sterling silver. This was the standard from 1601 to 1816.

== Pennies by period ==
- History of the English penny (c. 600 – 1066)
- History of the English penny (1066–1154) (The Early Normans and the Anarchy, 1066–1154)
- History of the English penny (1154–1485) (The Plantagenets, 1154–1485)
- History of the English penny (1485–1603) (The Tudors, 1485–1603)
- History of the English penny (1603–1707) (The Stuarts and the Commonwealth)
- History of the British penny (1714–1901) (The Hanoverians)
- History of the British penny (1901–1970) (The twentieth century penny, 1901–1970)
- Decimal Day, 1971
- Penny (British decimal coin) (post-decimalisation, 1971–present)

== See also ==
- Coins of the pound sterling
- Sixpence
