= Three halfpence =

Three halfpence may refer to:

- Three halfpence (British coin), a silver coin produced for circulation in the British colonies, mainly in Ceylon and the West Indies in each year between 1834 and 1843, and also in 1860 and 1862; proof coins were also produced in 1870
- Three halfpence (English coin), a silver coin introduced in Elizabeth I of England's third and fourth coinages (1561–1582)
- Three Halfpence Red, first issued 1870, the first Three Halfpenny postage stamp issued in the United Kingdom
