= History of the English penny (1066–1154) =

Early history of the English penny coin

After William I conquered England in 1066, he continued to use the Anglo-Saxon currency system, including the penny. During the early 1100s, individual halfpannies and quarter pennies were introduced, but proved unpopular, and were discontinued. Amid The Anarchy, pennies were produced by both rival claimants to the throne. Throughout this entire period, the quality and amount of the silver in pennies was a recurring issue.

== The early Norman kings ==
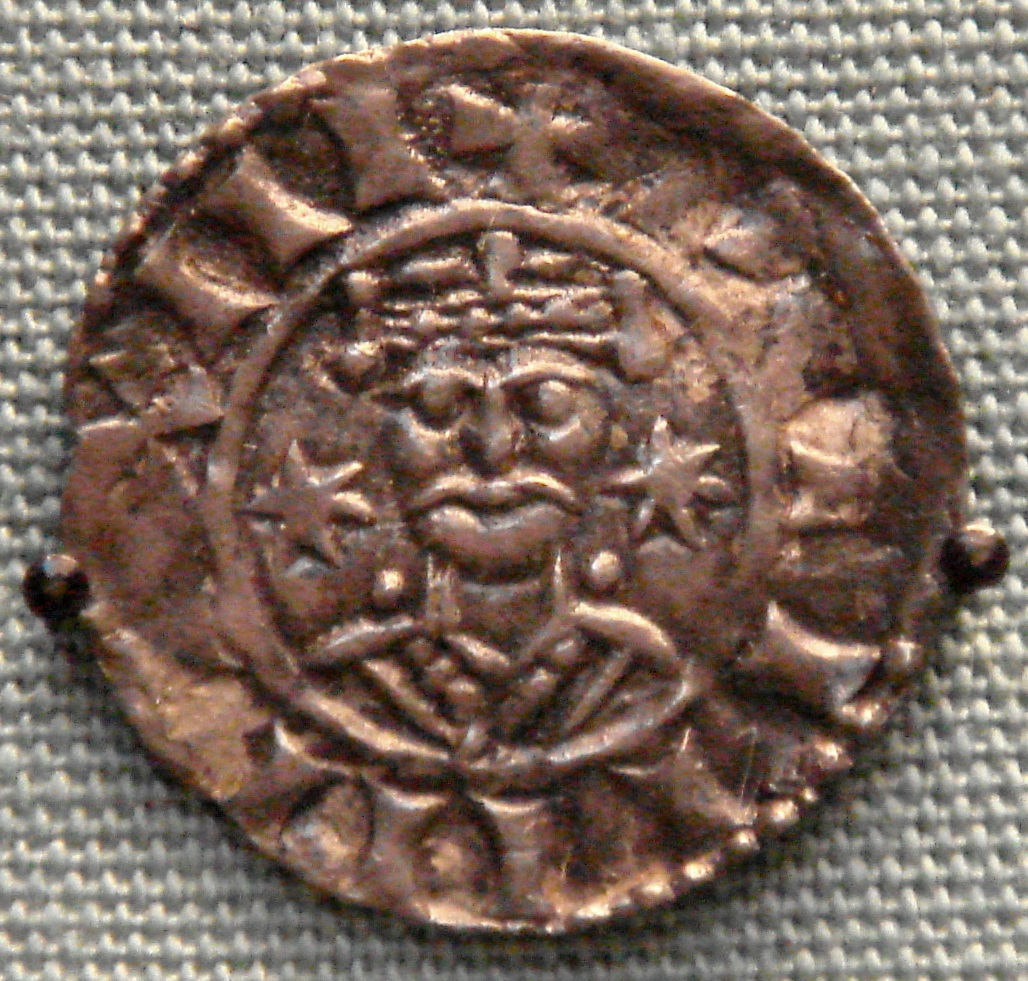
William I penny, minted at Lewes

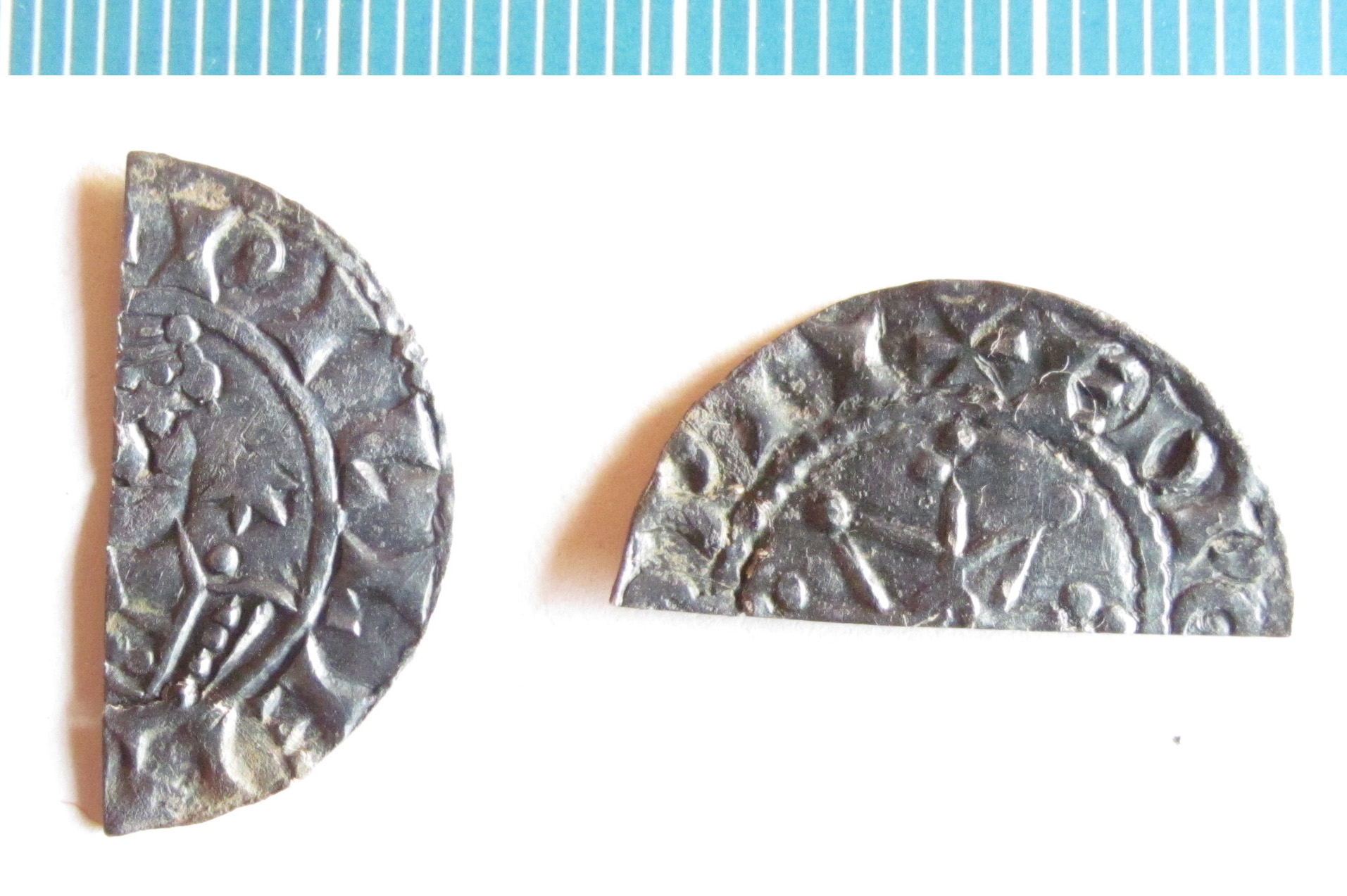
Cut penny of William I, minted at Norwich

Following the Norman Conquest, William the Conqueror continued the Anglo-Saxon coinage system. As a penny was a fairly large unit of currency at the time, when small change was needed a penny would be cut in half or into quarters at the mint of issue. Most pennies of Kings William I and II show a front-facing bust of the king on the obverse (which was a departure from the Anglo-Saxon kings, who mostly used a sideways-facing bust), surrounded by a legend, usually PILLEMUS REX, PILLEM REX ANGLOR, PILLEM REX AN, PILLELM REX, PILLEM R (King William, or William King of the English — The P may have been a late usage of the letter wynn, a P-shaped rune which had the sound value of a "w"). The reverse of the coin usually showed some form of cross, surrounded by the legend identifying the moneyer and mint.

Moneyers were personally responsible for maintaining the weight (at this time, 20 to 22 grains, 1.3 to 1.6 grams) and the silver fineness of the coins they produced — there are several recorded instances of moneyers who produced short-weight coins being mutilated or occasionally executed. Although there was only a small amount of space on the reverse, the moneyer's "identification details" were considered more important than the mint and were not often abbreviated (although often 'mis-spelt'). The moneyer's name would appear after a small cross, and is usually followed by "ON" (of) and the town's name. During the reign of William I (1066–1087) the demand for coins was so high that there were about 70 mints active; over 50 were active at the start of William II's reign in 1087, but only 34 were still in operation at his death in 1100.

=== Location of mints, 1066–1100 ===
During the reign of the first two Norman kings, mints were located in Barnstaple, Bath, Bedford, Bedwyn, Bridport, Bristol, Bury St Edmunds, Cambridge, Canterbury, Cardiff, Chester, Chichester, Christchurch, Colchester, Cricklade, Derby, Devitum (probably St David's, South Wales), Dorchester, Dover, Durham, Exeter, Gloucester, Guildford, Hastings, Hereford, Hertford, Huntingdon, Hythe, Ilchester, Ipswich, Launceston, Leicester, Lewes, Lincoln, London, Maldon, Malmesbury, Marlborough, Northampton, Norwich, Nottingham, Oxford, Peterborough, Pevensey, Rhuddlan, Rochester, Romney, Salisbury, Sandwich, Shaftesbury, Shrewsbury, Southwark, Stafford, Stamford, Steyning, Sudbury, Tamworth, Staffordshire, Taunton, Thetford, Totnes, Wallingford, Wareham, Warwick, Watchet, Wilton, Winchcombe, Winchester, Worcester, and York.

During the relatively long reign of King Henry I (1100–1135) the penny remained the chief denomination, although round halfpennies and quarter pennies were introduced, which proved very unpopular and only about twelve halfpence and no quarter specimens are known to exist today. Fifteen major types of penny were produced, at around 54 mints which were intermittently active throughout the reign. The quality of the coins in the early part of the reign was poor, as the moneyers made a large profit by producing underweight coins or coins of debased fineness. In 1124 Henry called all 150 moneyers to Winchester and called them to account for their activities — 94 of them were convicted of issuing sub-standard coins and were mutilated, with their right hands and one testicle being cut off, as a result of which the quality of coins improved for most of the remainder of his reign. The basic design of the coins remained the same as before with the obverse inscriptions variously being HENRICUS, HENRICUS R, HENRI R, HENRI RE, HENRI REX, HENRY REX, HENRICUS REX, HENRICUS REX A — Henry, King Henry, Henry King of England.

=== Location of mints, 1100–1135 ===
During the reign of King Henry I, mints were located in Barnstaple, Bath, Bedford, Bristol, Bury St Edmunds, Cambridge, Canterbury, Cardiff, Carlisle, Chester, Chichester, Christchurch, Colchester, Derby, Dorchester, Dover, Durham, Exeter, Gloucester, Hastings, Hereford, Huntingdon, Ilchester, Ipswich, Launceston, Leicester, Lewes, Lincoln, London, Northampton, Norwich, Nottingham, Oxford, Pembroke, Pevensey, Rochester, Romney, Salisbury, Sandwich, Shaftesbury, Shrewsbury, Southampton, Southwark, Stafford, Stamford, Sudbury, Tamworth, Taunton, Thetford, Totnes, Wallingford, Wareham, Warwick, Watchet, Wilton, Winchcombe, Winchester, Worcester, and York.

One of the largest hoards of coins of Henry I was the Lincoln Melandry Hoard found in February 1972. This provided many new examples of coins minted by previously undocumented moneyers for the later issues of Henry I's reign.

== The Anarchy ==
The period following the death of King Henry I is known as The Anarchy. Henry's only legitimate son and heir had been drowned in 1120 in the White Ship disaster, so he had decided that he wished his daughter Matilda to succeed him. When he died, Matilda, also known as the Empress Maud, was in Normandy and her cousin Stephen of Blois managed to get back to London before she did, and claimed the throne - with the support of many barons who were unprepared for the novel idea of a woman ruler. Matilda and Stephen set up rival courts in Bristol and London and proceeded to issue coins from the mints under their control while the political unrest continued for the better part of 20 years. Stephen won the political battle, but when his own son and heir, Eustace, died in 1153 he agreed that Matilda's son Henry would succeed him.

Many of the coins produced during the Anarchy are of poor quality.

=== King Stephen's coins ===
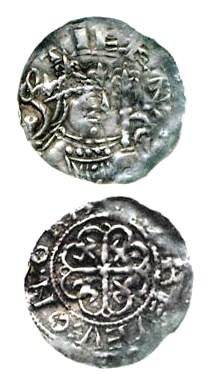
A penny minted under the authority of King Stephen

There are approximately 5 principal varieties of coins produced by Stephen's mints, normally containing the legend STIEFNE, STIEFNE R, STIEFNE RE, or STIEFNE REX, but one issue bears the legend PERERIC which cannot be translated but is thought to have been constructed by the moneyers to look like the previous reign's HENRICUS, so they could disassociate themselves from the conflict and hedge their bets about who would win, while still providing the required number of new coins.

Stephen's coins were minted at Bedford, Bramber, Bristol, Bury St Edmunds, Cambridge, Canterbury, Cardiff, Carlisle, Castle Rising, Chester, Chichester, Cipen (possibly Ipswich), Colchester, Corbridge, Derby, Dorchester, Dover, Durham, Eden, Exeter, Gloucester, Hastings, Hedon near Hull, Hereford, Huntingdon, Ipswich, Launceston, Leicester, Lewes, Lincoln, London, Newcastle, Northampton, Norwich, Nottingham, Oxford, Pembroke, Peterborough, Pevensey, Rye, Salisbury, Sandwich, Shaftesbury, Shrewsbury, Southampton, Southwark, Stafford, Steyning, Sudbury, Swansea, Tamworth, Taunton, Thetford, Tutbury, Wareham, Warwick, Watchet, Wilton, Winchester, Worcester, and York.

=== Empress Maud's coins ===
Matilda's coins tend to show a cruder style than Stephen's regular issues. The obverse legend is MATILDIS IMP — Empress Matilda, MATILDIS COMITISSA — Countess Matilda, or simply MATILDIS — Matilda.

Matilda's coins were minted at Bristol, Cardiff, Gloucester, Oxford, and Wareham, and possibly also at Calne and Canterbury.
