= Three halfpence (British coin) =

Former coin of the British Empire

- United Kingdom
- Value: 1 1/2d sterling
- Mass: 0.71 g
- Diameter: (1834-1837) 12.3 mm (1837-1870) 12 mm
- Edge: plain
- Composition: 92.5% Ag
- Years of minting: 1834-1843, 1860, 1862, 1870

Obverse
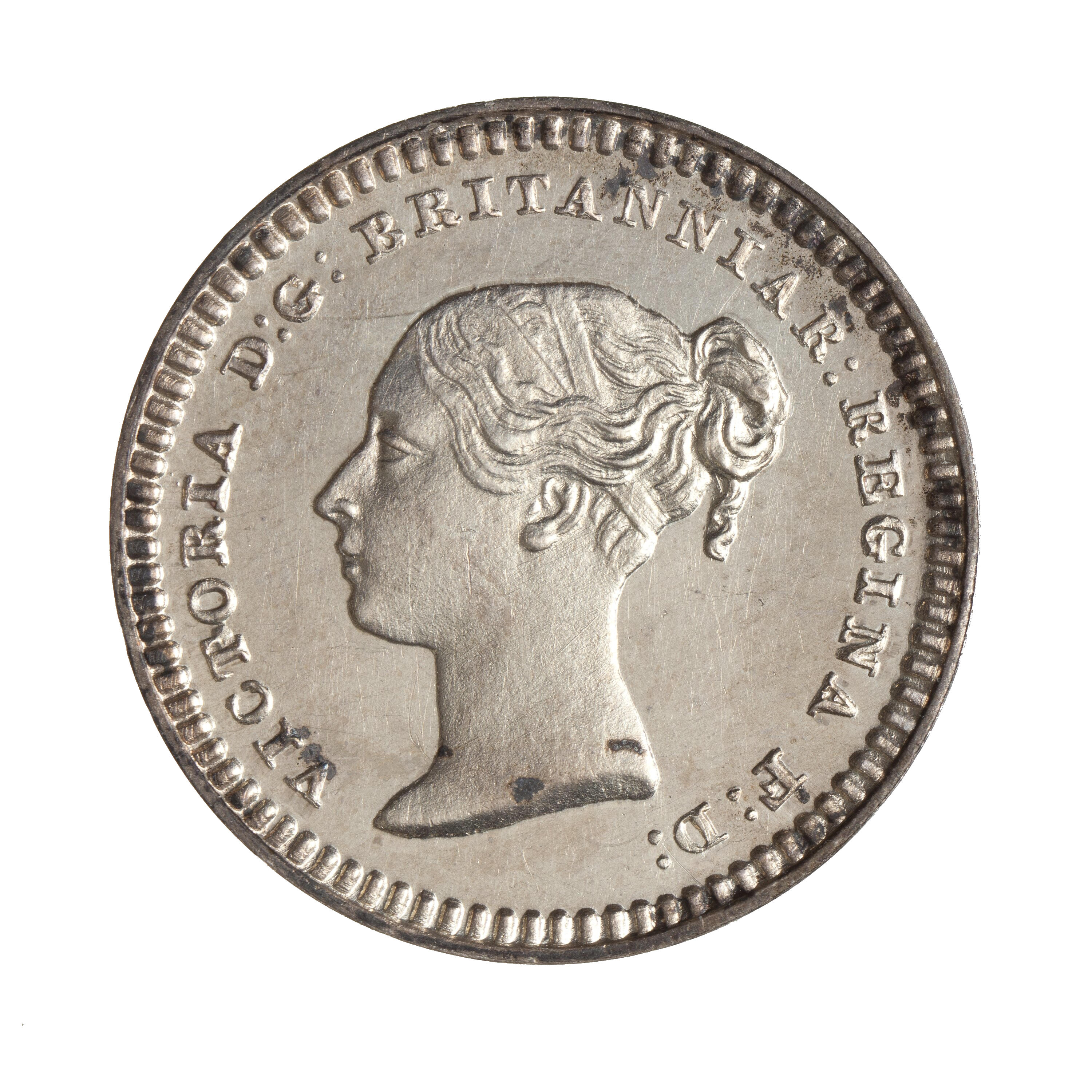
- Design: Profile of the monarch (Victoria shown)
- Designer: William Wyon
- Design date: 1837

Reverse
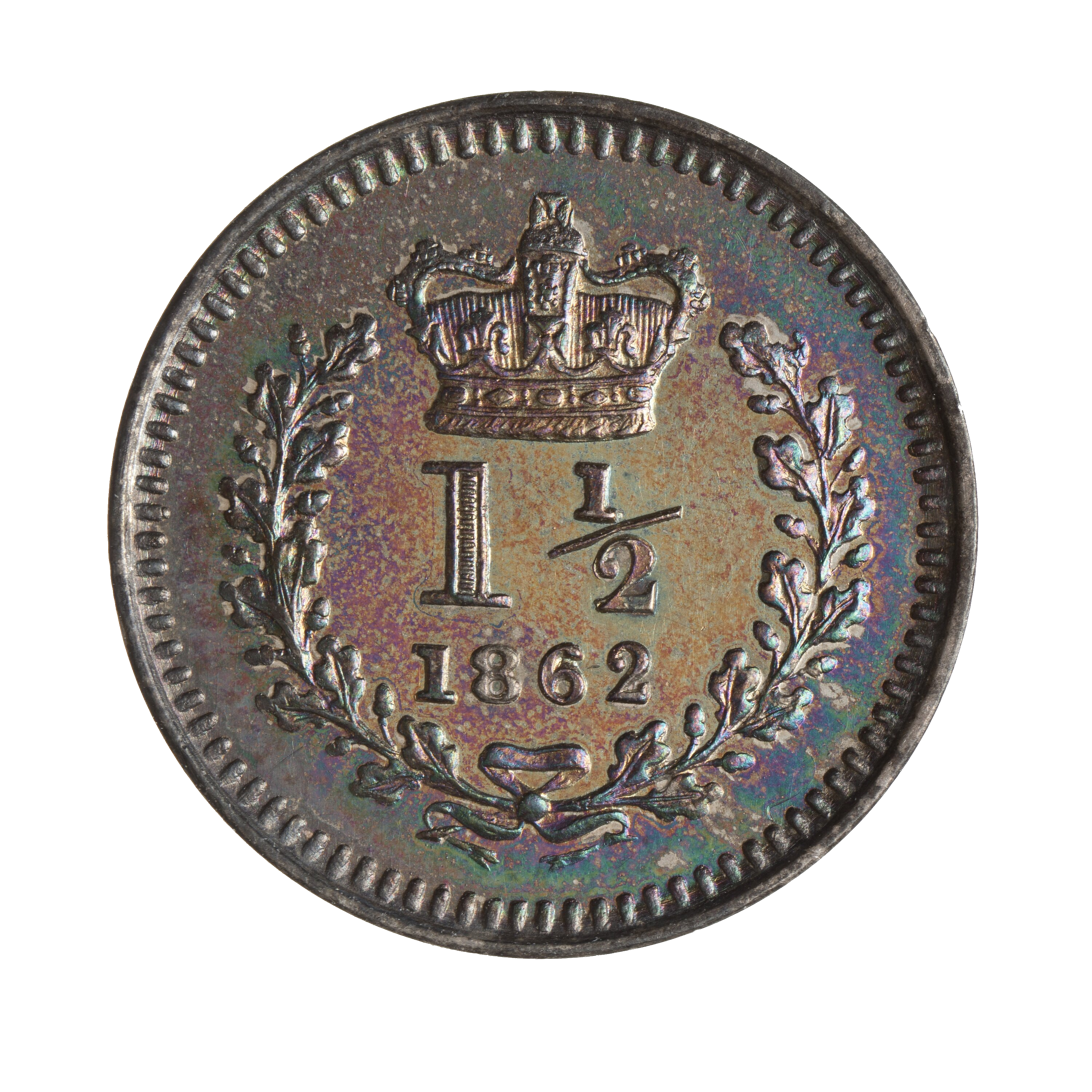
- Design: Crown and wreath
- Design date: 1834

The British three halfpence coin was a denomination of sterling coinage worth 1/160 of one pound or 1/8 of one shilling. It was produced for circulation in the British colonies, mainly in Ceylon and the West Indies in each year between 1834 and 1843, and also in 1860 and 1862. Proof coins were also produced in 1870.

The coin is considered to be part of the British coinage because the territories it was struck for otherwise used standard sterling coin and had no independent monetary policy.

The coins were made of silver, weighed 0.7 grams (defined as 1/44 troy ounce) and had a diameter of 12 millimetres (0.47 in). The reverse of the coin, throughout its existence, showed "1 1/2" beneath a crown and over the date, all contained within a wreath. The obverse of coins minted between 1834 and 1837 show the right-facing portrait of King William IV with the inscription GULIELMUS IIII D G BRITANNIAR REX F D. The obverse of the later coins bear the left-facing portrait of Queen Victoria, with the inscription VICTORIA D G BRITANNIAR REGINA F D.

For other denominations, see British coinage.

In Jamaica it was nicknamed a quatty, because it was worth one quarter of a sixpence.

== See also ==
- Three halfpence (English coin)
