= Hospital of the Holy Innocents =

Medieval hospital in England

The Hospital of the Holy Innocents, Lincoln
- The Melandry
- Location in Lincolnshire
- 53.214598°N 0.543955°W
- Location: South Park, Lincoln

History
- Founded: late 11th or early 12th century either by Bishop Remigius or Henry I.
- Demolished: After 1544

The Hospital of the Holy Innocents, or the Melandry was a Leper Hospital on South Park common in Lincoln, England. It was founded in the late 11th or early 12th century either by Bishop Remigius or Henry I. It was possibly the first Leper Hospital to be founded in England. In 1422 the confraternity of Burton Lazars was granted the Hospital of the Holy Innocents. At the time of Dissolution of the Monasteries, the Hospital, together with the Burton Lazars hospital were purchased by William Cecil, 1st Baron Burghley

== The Lincoln Melandry hoard of coins of Henry I ==
At the start of 1972 a hoard of silver pennies of Henry I were found during building work within the area of enclosure of the Melandry. A total of 744 coins and fragments were found, which at the time constituted the largest hoard of coins of Henry I. Examples of coins of Henry I, which are normally very poorly struck, included many very rare examples from the later period of Henry I reign. A few coins were discovered initially and reported to the Lincoln City and County Museum and a few days later the bulk of the hoard was dislodged from the side of the foundation trench, and there was evidence that the hoard had been wrapped in a cloth or linen bag. Further coins were found in excavations by the Museum and the Lincoln Archaeological Trust. Following a treasure trove inquest, held in the Lincoln Stonebow and Guildhall, the coins were split between the City and County Museum, who were awarded 470 coins, and the British Museum the remaining coins. The British Museum was supposed to have published the hoard, but this has not happened but a listing of the coins in the City and County Museum (now the Collection) has been published

== Bibliography ==
- Cookson Dr. W.D. (1843) On the Hospital of the Holy Innocents of Lincoln, called the Melandry, with some account of Leprosy in the Middle Ages., in A selection of Papers relative to the County of Lincoln read before the Lincolnshire Topographical Society 1841,1842. pp. 67–90, W & B Brooke, High Street, Lincoln.
- Sister Elspeth (1906) in Page, William,(ed). A History of the County of Lincoln Volume 2. Victoria County History. pp. 230–213 The Hospital of the Holy Innocents without Lincoln.
