= Three halfpence (English coin) =

Archaic English coin (1561–1582)

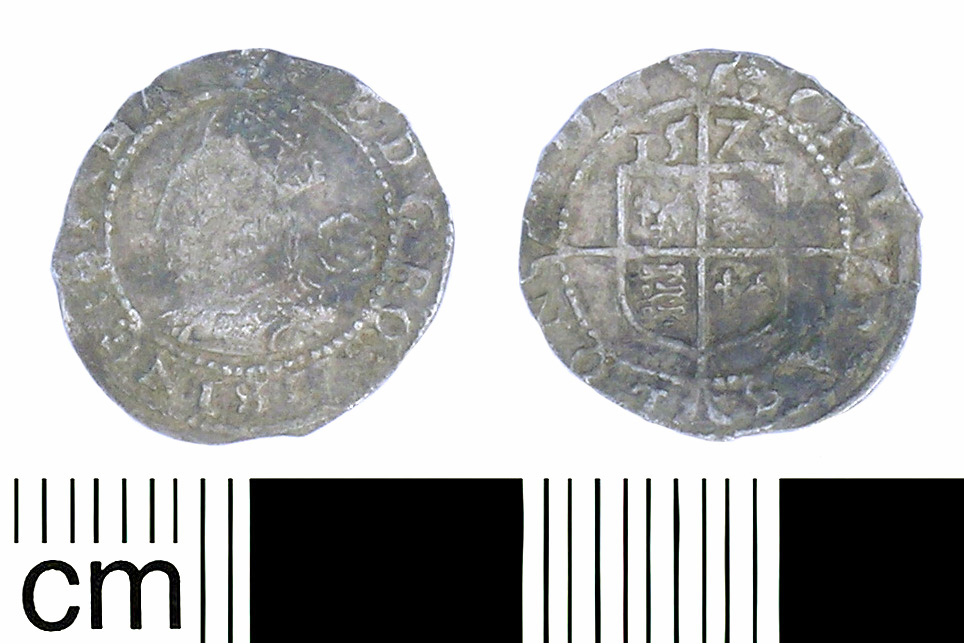
Three halfpence coin

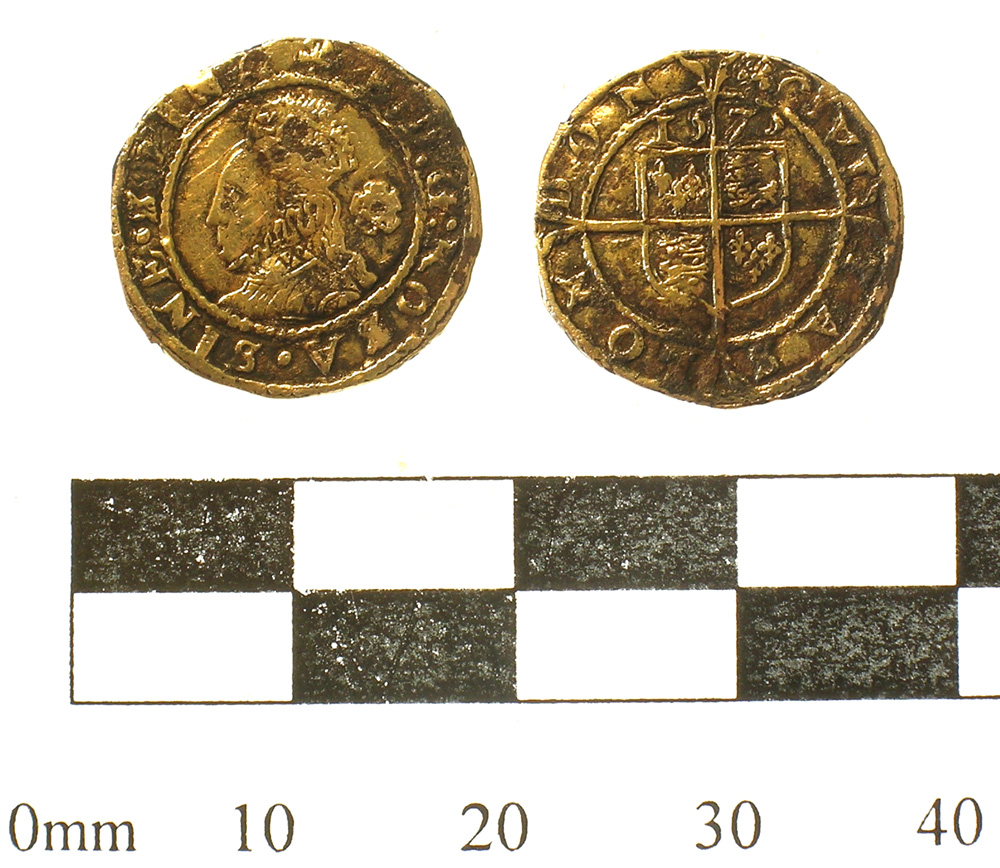
Three halfpence coin

The English three halfpence, a silver coin worth 1 1/2d, was introduced in Elizabeth I's third and fourth coinages (1561–1582) as part of a plan to produce large quantities of coins of varying denominations and high silver content. The obverse shows a left-facing bust of the queen, with a rose behind her, with the legend E D G ROSA SINE SPINA – Elizabeth by the grace of God a rose without a thorn – while the reverse shows the royal arms with the date above the arms and a mintmark at the beginning of the legend CIVITAS LONDON – City of London, the Tower Mint. It was worth 1/8 shilling, or 1/160 pound sterling.

The three-halfpence coin closely resembles the three-farthing coin and the thruppence coin, which differed only in the diameter. This is 16 mm (0.63 in) in an unclipped coin, compared to 14 mm (0.55 in) for the three-farthings, and 16 mm (0.63 in) for the thruppence (except 1561, which was 21 mm (0.83 in)).

No three-halfpences were produced after 1582, probably because under both James I and Charles I large quantities of halfpennies and farthings were produced.

== See also ==
- Three halfpence (British coin), a 19th-century coin
