= Sixpence (British coin) =

Former coin of the United Kingdom and other territories

Six pence
- United Kingdom
- Value: 6d (until 1971); 2 1/2 new pence (equivalent)
- Mass: (1816–1970) 2.83 g
- Diameter: 19.41 mm
- Edge: Milled
- Composition: (1551–1816) Silver; (1816–1920) 92.5% Ag; (1920–1946) 50% Ag; (1947–1970) Cupronickel
- Years of minting: 1551–1970

Obverse
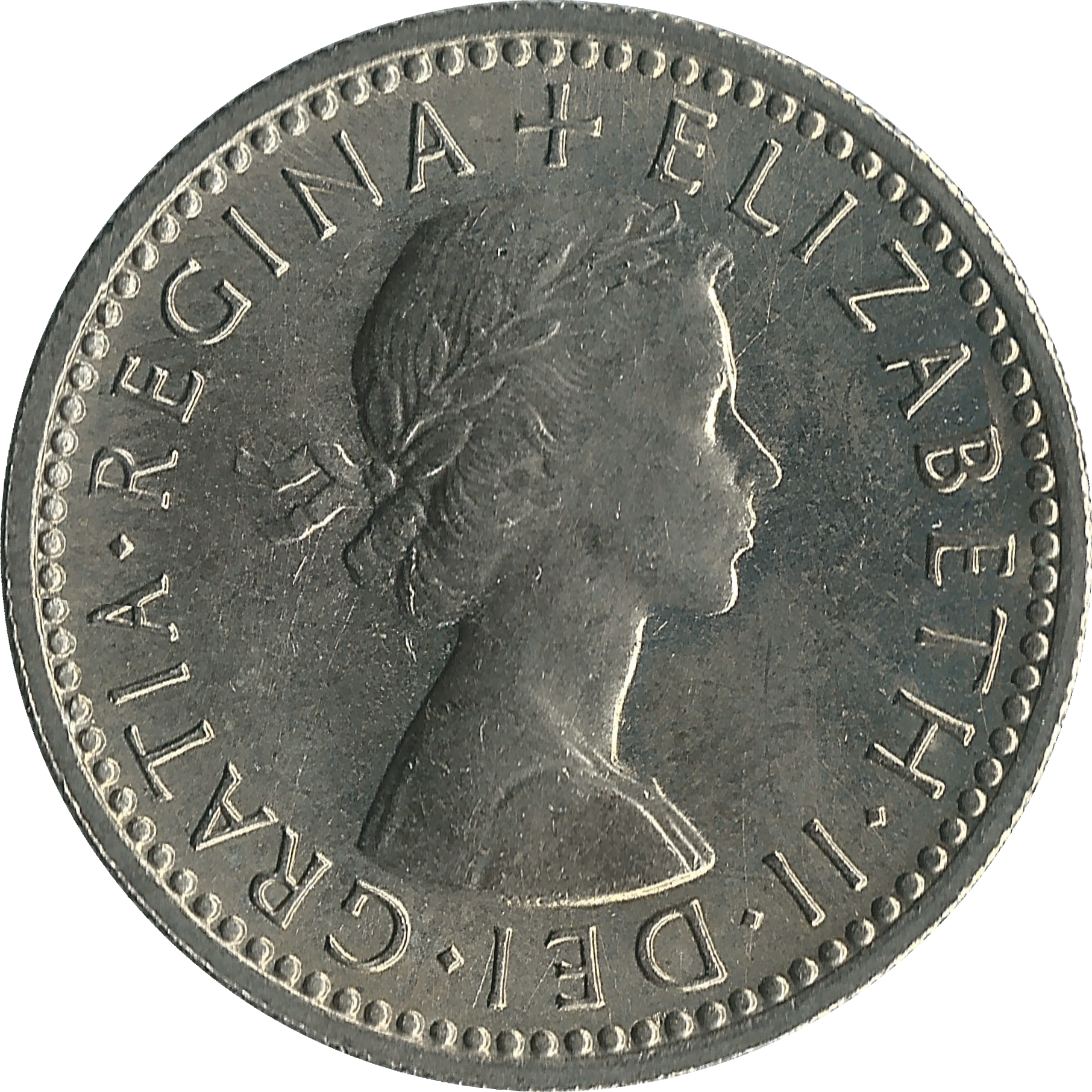
- Design: Profile of the monarch (Elizabeth II design shown)
- Designer: Mary Gillick
- Design date: 1953

Reverse
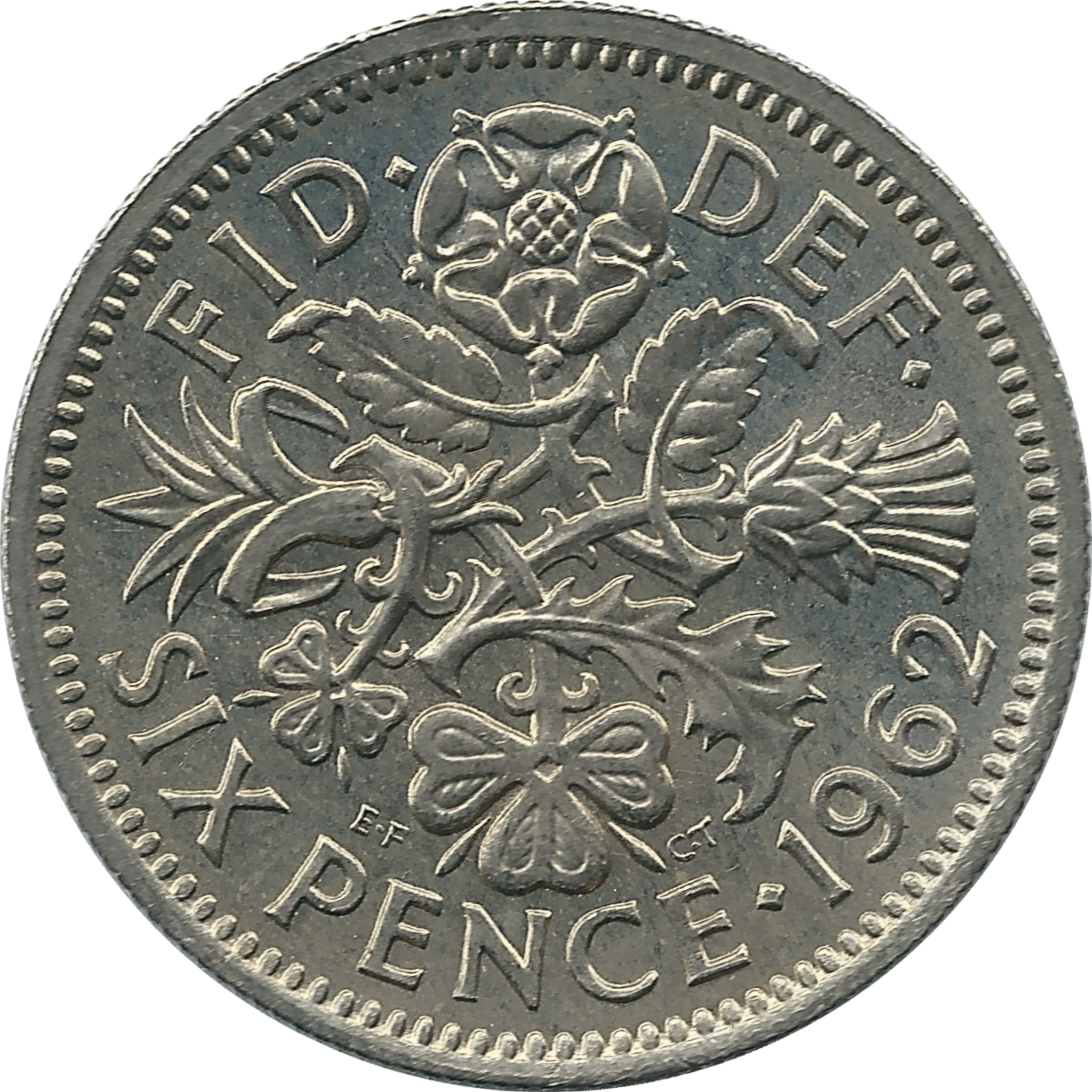
- Design: Various (floral design shown)
- Designer: Edgar Fuller and Cecil Thomas
- Design date: 1947

Sixpence (Decimal)
- United Kingdom
- Value: 0.06 pound sterling
- Mass: 3.35 g
- Diameter: 19.41 mm
- Edge: Milled
- Composition: 92.5% Ag
- Years of minting: 2016–present

Obverse
- Design: Profile of the monarch
- Designer: Jody Clark
- Design date: 2015

Reverse
- Design: Royal cypher of Elizabeth II with plants and flowers
- Designer: John Bergdahl
- Design date: 2016

The British sixpence (/ˈsɪkspəns/) coin, sometimes known as a tanner, was a denomination of sterling coinage worth six old pence: 1/40 of a pound or half a shilling. In 1971 it became worth the equivalent of 2.5 new pence. It was first minted in England in 1551, during the reign of Edward VI, and circulated until 1980. The coin was made from silver from its introduction in 1551 until 1947, and thereafter in cupronickel.

Before Decimal Day in 1971, sterling used the Carolingian monetary system (£sd), under which the largest unit was a pound (£), divisible into 20 shillings (s), each worth 12 pence (d), the value of two pre-decimal sixpence coins. Following decimalisation, the old sixpence had a value of 2 1/2 new pence (£0.025).

In 2016, new decimal sixpences (face value £0.06) began being minted by the Royal Mint as commemorative issues; these coins have been produced for each year since then, and are minted in sterling silver. They are not intended for circulation as tender, but just like older mintages, these coins continue to have uses in especially Christmas and wedding traditions; cf. § Cultural significance, below.

== History ==
The first sixpences were minted in 1551, during the reign of Edward VI. They came about as a result of the debasement of silver coinage in the 1540s, in particular the silver testoon, which fell in value from 12d to 6d. The debased testoon was likely useful in everyday transactions, and it was decided that new coinage should be introduced with the express denomination of six pence. The testoon decreased in value because, unlike today, the value of coins was determined by the market value of the metal they contained, and during the reign of Henry VIII the purity of silver in coinage had fallen significantly.

Sixpences were minted during the reign of every British monarch after Edward VI, as well as during the Commonwealth, with a vast number of variations and alterations over the years. During the reign of George II a number of issues were designed by John Sigismund Tanner, who became Chief Engraver of the Royal Mint, and it has been suggested that this is the origin of the nickname "tanner", which was a popular name for the coin until decimalisation. An alternative explanation for the nickname is that it comes from the Angloromani word tawno meaning small thing.

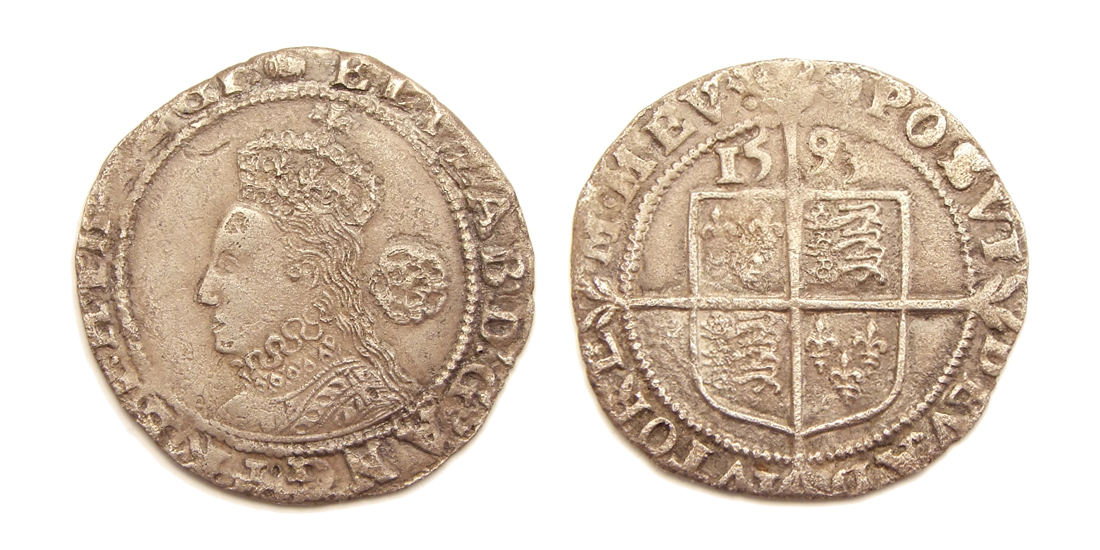
Sixpence of Queen Elizabeth I, struck in 1593 at the Tower Mint

The Royal Mint undertook a massive recoinage programme in 1816, with large quantities of gold and silver coin being minted. Previous issues of silver coinage had been irregular, and the previous issue, minted in 1787, had done little to alleviate the chronic shortage of silver coinage in general circulation. New silver coinage was to be of .925 (sterling) standard, with silver coins to be minted at 66 shillings to the pound weight. Hence, newly minted sixpences weighed 1/11 troy ounce, equivalent to 43.636 grains or 2.828 grams.

The Royal Mint debased the silver coinage in 1920 from 92.5% silver to 50% silver. Sixpences of both alloys were minted that year. This debasement was done because of the rising price of silver around the world, and followed the global trend of elimination, or reduction in purity, of the silver in coinage. The minting of silver coinage of the pound sterling ceased completely in 1946 for similar reasons, exacerbated by the costs of the Second World War. New "silver" coinage was instead minted in cupronickel, an alloy of copper and nickel containing no silver at all.

Beginning with Lord Wrottesley's proposals in the 1820s, there were various attempts to decimalise the pound sterling over the next century and a half. These attempts came to nothing significant until the 1960s, when the need for a currency more suited to simple monetary calculations became pressing. The decision to decimalise was announced in 1966, with the pound to be divided into 100, rather than 240, pence. Decimal Day was set as 15 February 1971, and a whole range of new coins were introduced. Sixpences continued to be legal tender, with a value of 2 1/2 new pence, until 30 June 1980.

=== 2016 decimal sixpence ===
In 2016, the Royal Mint began minting legal tender decimal sixpence coins in sterling silver, intended as commemorative coins for the Christmas season. These coins are heavier than the pre-1970 sixpence (3.35 grams instead of 2.83 grams), and have a denomination of six new pence (6p) instead of six old pence (6d). The new reverse was designed by John Bergdahl.

== Design ==
Sixpences issued during the reign of Edward VI features a portrait of the king on the obverse, with a Tudor rose to the left, and the denomination VI to the right. Surrounding the portrait is the inscription EDWARD VI D G AGL FRA Z HIB REX, or similar, meaning "Edward VI, by the Grace of God, King of England, France and Ireland". All sixpences minted under subsequent kings and queens bear a similar inscription on the obverse identifying the monarch (or Lord Protector during the Commonwealth), with the portrait usually alternating from left-facing to right-facing, or vice versa, between monarchs. The reverse features the escutcheon of the Royal Arms of England, surrounded by the inscription POSVI DEVM ADIVTORE MEVM, or a variant, meaning "I have made God my helper".

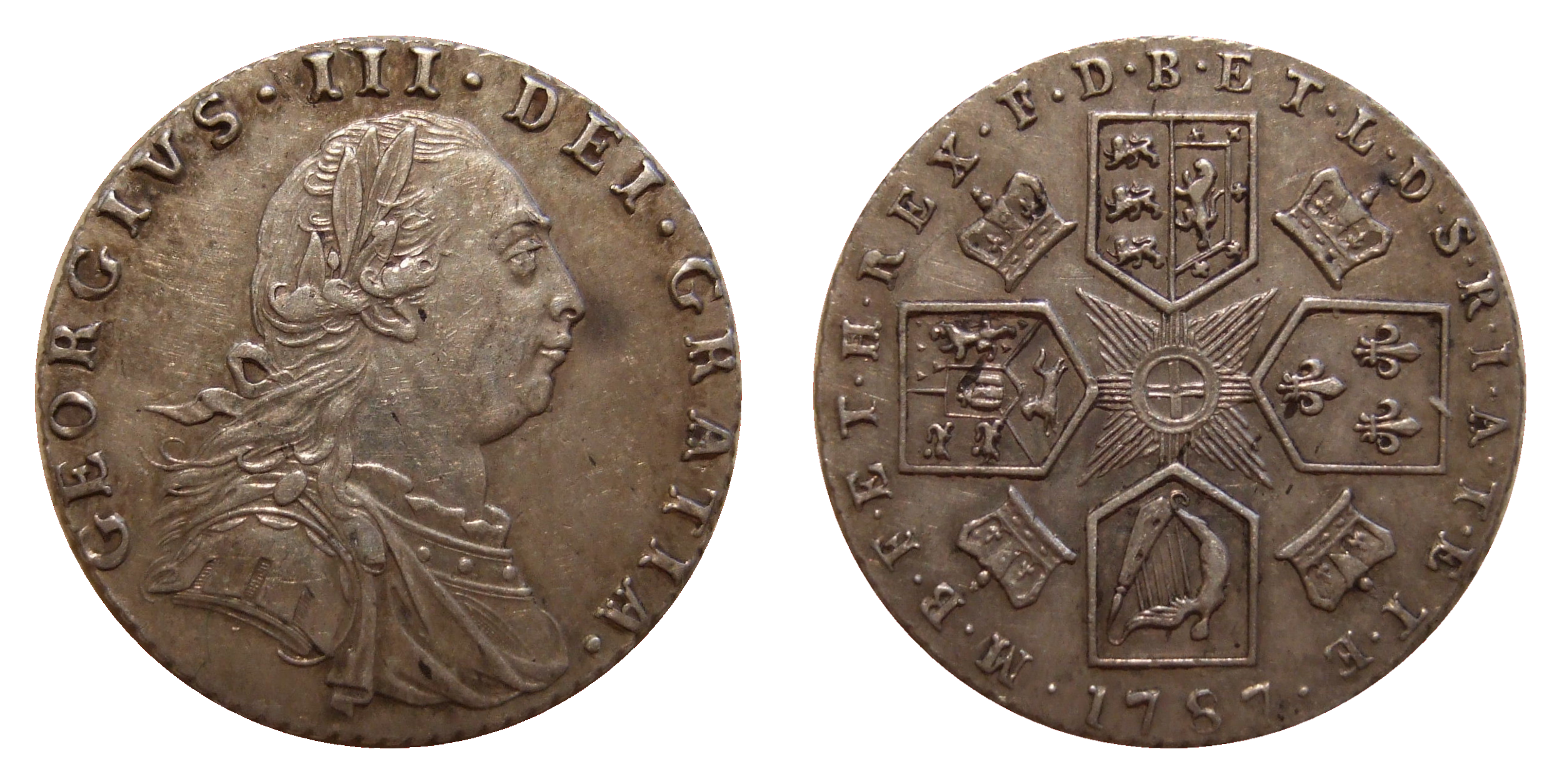
Obverse and reverse of the 1787 sixpence, depicting George III

Starting with Elizabeth, the coins have the year of minting stamped on the reverse. Unusually, the sixpences minted in 1561 and 1562 were milled, i.e. produced by machine rather than by hand, with the press of the Frenchman Eloy Mestrelle, who had been granted authority to mint coins by the queen. Although of higher quality than hammered coins, Mestrelle's sixpences were more expensive to produce, and machine-struck coinage ceased to be minted in 1572. The coins remained in circulation for over a hundred years, but it took until the reign of Charles II for milled coins of the pound sterling to be minted again. Sixpences minted after the Tudor period no longer bear the Tudor rose on the obverse.

Early sixpences of James I feature the alternative reverse inscription EXVRGAT DEVS DISSIPENTVR INIMICI, meaning "Let God arise and His enemies be scattered", becoming QVAE DEVS CONIVNXIT NEMO SEPARET, meaning "What God hath put together let no man put asunder" after 1604. Charles I sixpences follow the usual design, except that coins minted after 1630 do not bear a date, and the reverse inscription reads CHRISTO AVSPICE REGNO, meaning "I reign under the auspices of Christ".

During the beginning of Oliver Cromwell's Protectorship there was no portrait minted on the obverse – instead there is a wreathed shield featuring St George's Cross, surrounded by the inscription THE COMMONWEALTH OF ENGLAND. The reverse features the combined arms of England and Ireland, surrounded by the inscription GOD WITH VS. In 1656 the minting of milled coinage resumed, this time with the press of the Frenchman Peter Blondeau. The obverse of Cromwell's milled coinage features a portrait in the manner of a Roman emperor, surrounded by an inscription similar to those on the coins of earlier monarchs.

With the exception of a handful of early examples, Charles II sixpences continued to be machine-struck, and continued the usual practice of having a portrait of the monarch on the obverse. The reverse features a new design consisting of four shields arranged in a cross, with the inscription detailing the style of the monarch split across both sides of the coin. With minor changes, such as the device at the centre of the shields, and the designs between the shields, this basic design continued to be minted through the reign of George III.

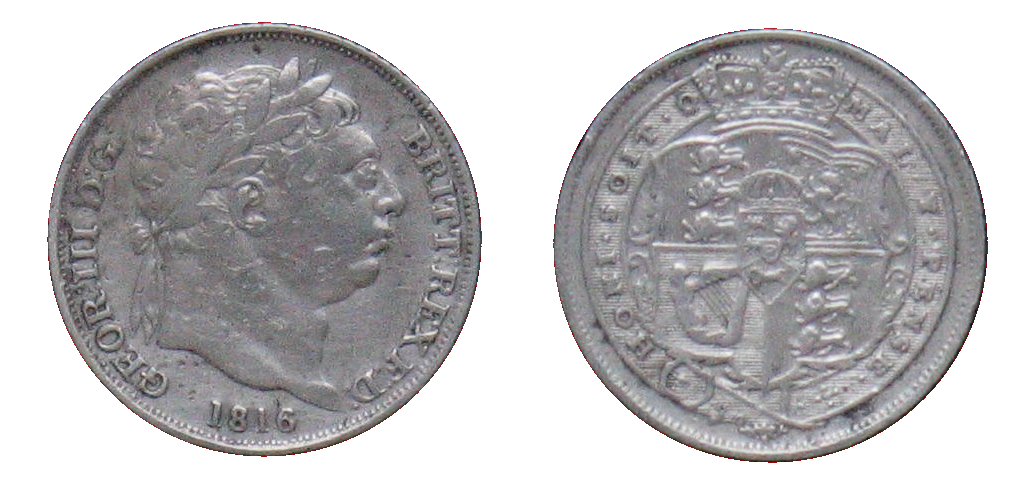
1816 sixpence, showing the post-recoinage design

Those coins minted after the great recoinage of 1816 bear the royal coat of arms on the reverse, surrounded by the Garter, which bears the words HONI SOIT QUI MAL Y PENSE, Middle French for "Shame on him who thinks ill of it". George IV sixpences are similar to those of his predecessor, but on some issues the Garter surrounding the shield is replaced by floral emblems representing England, Scotland and Ireland, with the inscription ANNO followed by the year of minting below.

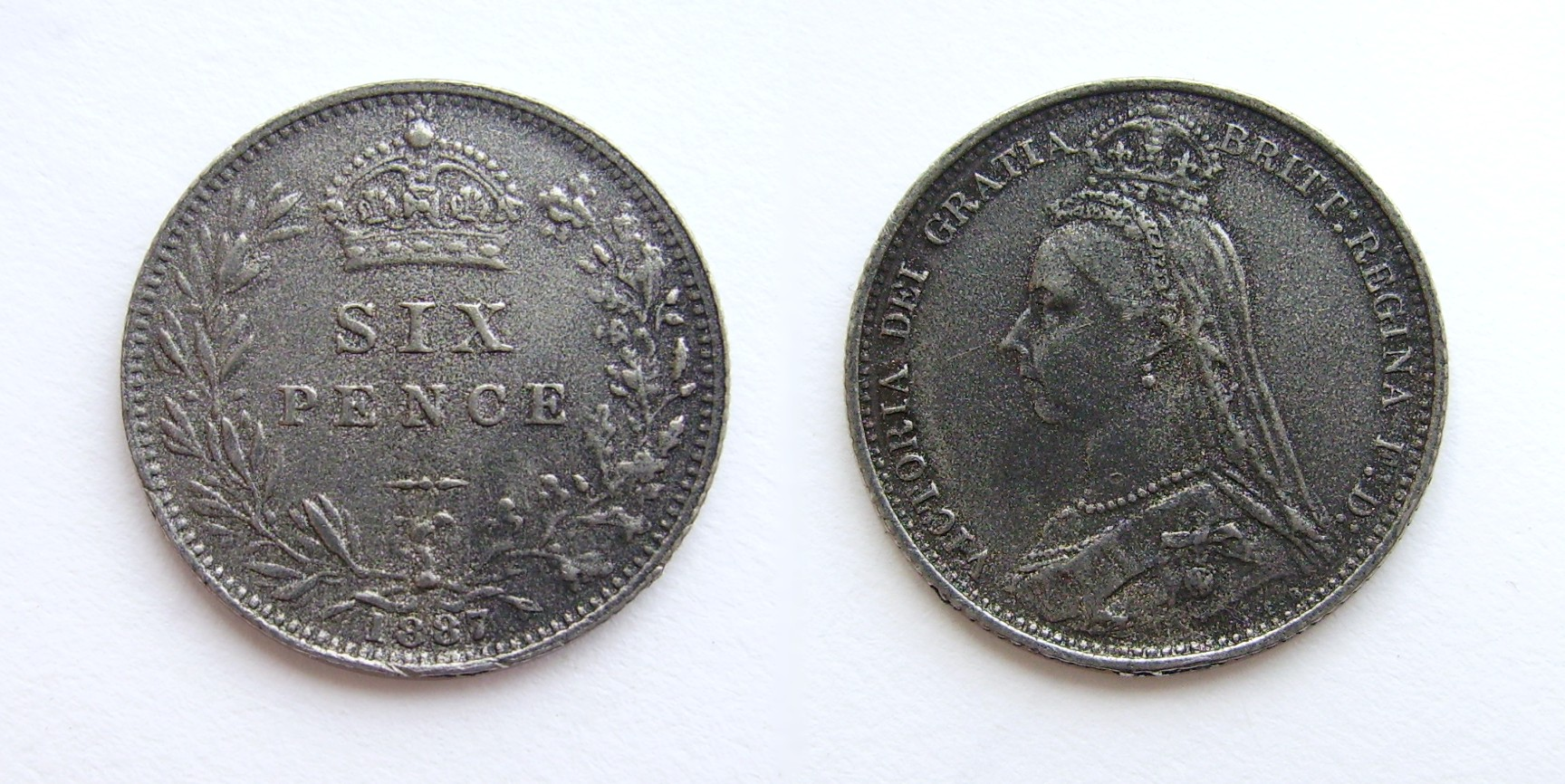
1887 sixpence showing the simpler reverse of SIX PENCE in the middle with Queen Victoria depicted on the obverse

William IV sixpences have a simpler reverse, composed of the words SIX PENCE in the middle, with a crown above, the date below, and a wreath surrounding. With the exception of a withdrawn 1887 issue, Queen Victoria and Edward VII sixpences share this reverse. The reverse of the 1887 issue is broadly the same as the post-1816 George III coins. This reverse is shared with the half-sovereign, and since the two are of a similar size, a problem arose with people passing off sixpences as half-sovereigns. The government agreed to remove the coin from circulation in November 1887 and change the reverse.

The reverse of George V sixpences minted prior to 1926 feature an alternative reverse design composed of a crown surmounted by a lion, with those minted after 1926 featuring a design of six oak sprigs divided by six acorns. Only a handful of Edward VIII sixpences were ever minted, and none of these entered circulation. These feature a reverse that is different again, composed of six interlinked rings, with the inscription SIXPENCE below and part of the monarch's style inscribed above. Unusually, the profile of Edward VIII on coins faces the same way as that of his predecessor.

George VI sixpences feature two different reverses, both featuring a crowned Royal Cypher. Those minted prior to 1949 feature a more angular font than those minted later. These later coins do not bear the abbreviation IND IMP, since the king was no longer Emperor of India. The final change in the design of the sixpence came in 1953 when a new reverse was designed for the sixpences of Elizabeth II. These coins feature a floral design by Edgar Fuller and Cecil Thomas on the reverse, consisting of a rose, thistle, shamrock and leek, representing the four Home Nations.

== Cultural significance ==
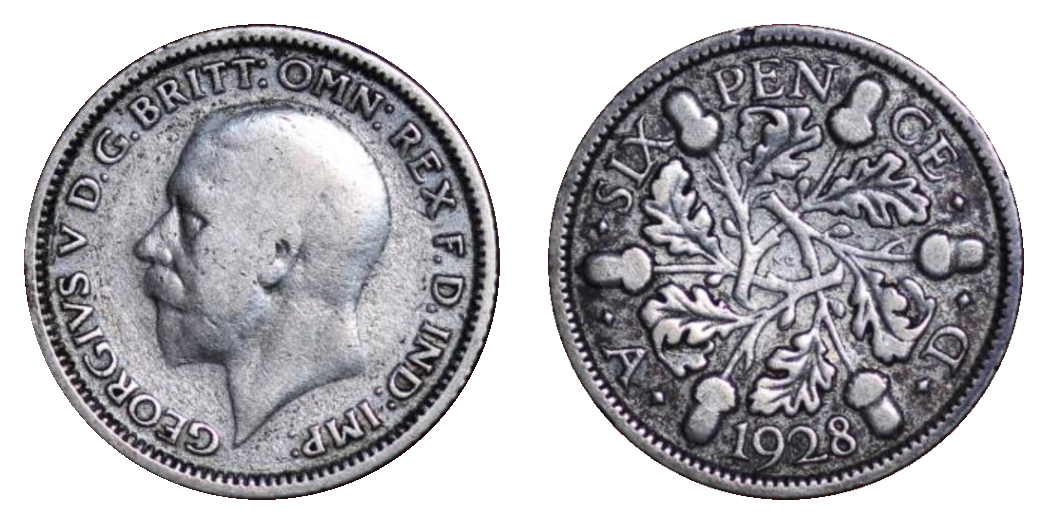
Obverse and reverse of the 1928 sixpence, depicting George V

As the supply of silver threepence coins slowly disappeared, Royal Mint sixpences replaced them as the coins traditionally put into Christmas puddings. From the Victorian era onwards, it became tradition to mix a threepence or sixpence into the ingredients when preparing a Christmas pudding, as the coin was believed to grant good luck. Prepared on Stir-up Sunday, the last Sunday before the start of Advent, the coin would be placed into the mixture, then the mixture was stirred by every member of the family. When it came to eating the pudding on Christmas Day, whoever found the sixpence in their slice would receive good luck in the year to come.

In Britain, there is a well-known tradition of the bride wearing "Something old, something new, something borrowed, something blue, and a silver sixpence in her shoe". A silver sixpence in the bride's shoe is a traditional wedding gesture for good luck; customarily the father of the bride places the sixpence, as a token of him wishing her prosperity, love and happiness in her marriage.

They are also used as a good luck charm by Royal Air Force aircrew who have them sewn behind their wings or brevets, a custom dating back to the Second World War.

The archaic slang "bender" for a sixpence emerged when the coin had a high silver content and could easily be bent, sometimes deliberately to create a love token. The Royal Mint website claims that the expression "going on a bender" (to indulge in a binge drinking session) derives from this meaning when one could drink all day in taverns for six pence.

In Shakespeare's A Midsummer Night's Dream (Act 4, Scene 2), we learn that by his absence (ensorcelled in Titania's bower) Bottom the Weaver will forgo sixpence a day for life from Theseus the Duke of Athens. In Elizabethan times, six pence was roughly a day's wage for rustic labour in the provinces. With it, one might buy two dinners, six performances of Hamlet among the groundlings at the Globe Theatre, or an unbound copy of the play itself.

In David Copperfield, Charles Dickens describes how its protagonist dealt with a street carman about taking his travel box to a coach office in London: "I told him mine, which was down that street there, and which I wanted him to take to the Dover coach office for sixpence", then he replying: "Done with you for a tanner!"

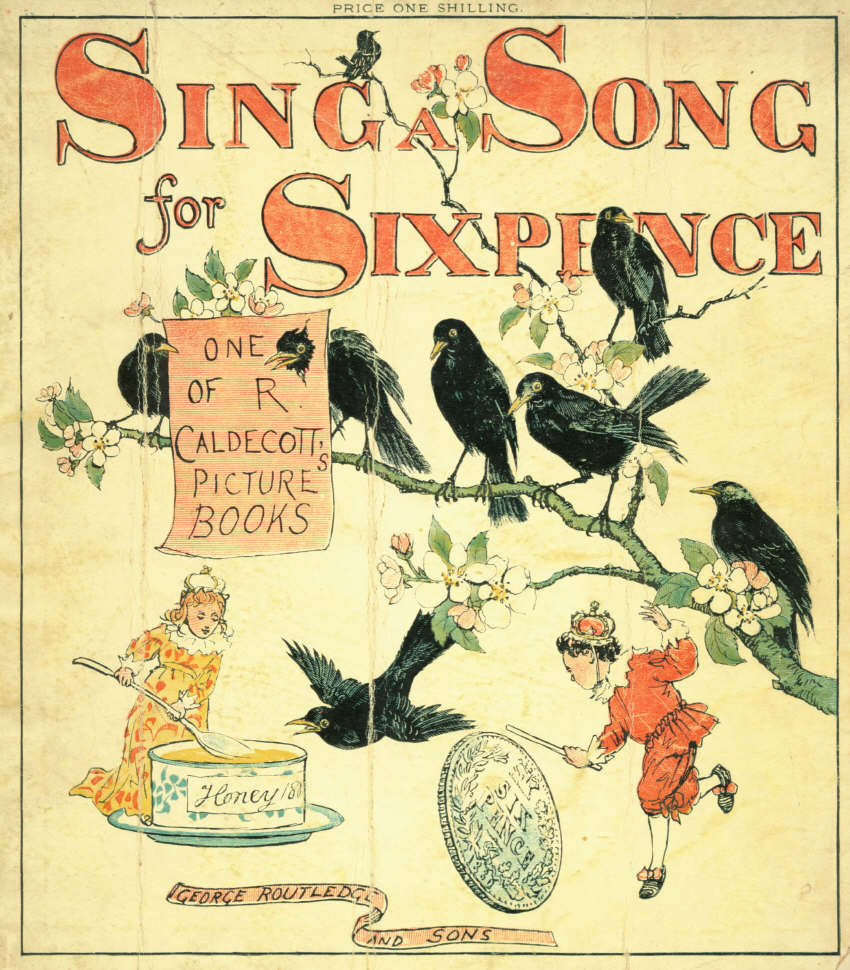
Cover illustration for Randolph Caldecott's picture book Sing a Song for Sixpence (1880)

The sixpence also features in other works of British popular culture and literature. It appears in the title of the writer W. Somerset Maugham's 1919 novel, The Moon and Sixpence, and appears in both the title and as a plot device in Michael Paraskos's novel In Search of Sixpence. The sixpence appears in the English nursery rhyme "Sing a Song of Sixpence" published in London in 1744. Half a Sixpence is the title of the 1963 West End stage musical, and the subsequent 1967 musical film version, of H. G. Wells's novel Kipps.

"I've Got Sixpence" is a song dating from at least 1810. An elaborated version was published in 1941, words and music by Elton Box & Desmond Cox, in which the singer tells the tale of spending twopence (per verse) until he has "no-pence to send home to my wife – poor wife."

Some guitarists prefer the rigidity of a coin to the flexibility of a more traditional plastic plectrum; among them are Brian May of Queen and Ian Bairnson of The Alan Parsons Project. May at some time even had sixpence-sized coins featuring his own head struck by the Royal Mint, which he used, gave away, and sold as his signature plectrum.

Sixpence None the Richer (also known as Sixpence) is an American rock band whose name was inspired by a passage from the book Mere Christianity by C. S. Lewis.

Penguin Books initially sold books in the 1930s through Woolworths and other high street stores for sixpence.

== Mintages ==
Victoria

- 1838 - 1,607,760
- 1839 - 3,310,560
- 1840 - 2,098,800
- 1841 - 1,386,000
- 1842 - 601,920
- 1843 - 3,160,080
- 1844 - 3,160,080
- 1845 - 3,714,480
- 1846 - 4,268,880
- 1848 - 586,080
- 1850 - 489,960
- 1851 - 2,288,107
- 1852 - 904,587
- 1853 - 3,837,930
- 1854 - 840,116
- 1855 - 1,129,084
- 1856 - 2,779,920
- 1857 - 2,233,440
- 1858 - 1,932,480
- 1859 - 4,688,640
- 1860 - 1,100,880
- 1862 - 990,000
- 1863 - 491,040
- 1864 - 4,253,040
- 1865 - 1,631,520
- 1866 - 5,140,080
- 1867 - 1,362,240
- 1868 - 1,069,200
- 1869 - 388,080
- 1870 - 479,613
- 1871 - 3,662,684
- 1872 - 3,382,049
- 1873 - 4,594,733
- 1874 - 4,225,726
- 1875 - 3,256,646
- 1876 - 941,435
- 1877 - 4,066,486
- 1878 - 2,624,525
- 1879 - 3,326,313
- 1880 - 3,892,051
- 1881 - 6,239,447
- 1882 - 759,809
- 1883 - 4,986,558
- 1884 - 3,422,565
- 1885 - 4,652,771
- 1886 - 2,728,249
- 1887 - 3,675,607
- 1888 - 4,197,698
- 1889 - 8,738,928
- 1890 - 9,386,955
- 1891 - 7,022,734
- 1892 - 6,245,746
- 1893 - 7,351,000
- 1894 - 3,467,704
- 1895 - 7,024,631
- 1896 - 6,651,699
- 1897 - 5,031,498
- 1898 - 5,914,100
- 1899 - 7,996,804
- 1900 - 8,984,354
- 1901 - 5,108,757

Edward VII

- 1902 - 6,372,501
- 1903 - 5,410,096
- 1904 - 4,487,098
- 1905 - 4,235,556
- 1906 - 7,641,146
- 1907 - 8,733,673
- 1908 - 6,739,491
- 1909 - 6,584,107
- 1910 - 12,490,724

George V

- 1911 - 9,161,317
- 1912 - 10,984,129
- 1913 - 7,499,833
- 1914 - 22,714,602
- 1915 - 15,694,597
- 1916 - 22,207,178
- 1917 - 7,725,475
- 1918 - 27,558,743
- 1919 - 13,375,447
- 1920 - 14,136,287
- 1921 - 30,339,741
- 1922 - 16,878,896
- 1923 - 6,382,793
- 1924 - 17,444,218
- 1925 - 12,720,558
- 1926 - 21,809,621
- 1927 - 68,939,873; 15,000 (Proof)
- 1928 - 23,123,384
- 1929 - 28,319,326
- 1930 - 16,990,289
- 1931 - 16,873,268
- 1932 - 9,406,117
- 1933 - 22,185,083
- 1934 - 9,304,009
- 1935 - 13,995,621
- 1936 - 24,380,171

George VI

- 1937 - 22,328,926
- 1938 - 13,402,701
- 1939 - 28,670,304
- 1940 - 20,875,196
- 1941 - 23,086,616
- 1942 - 44,942,785
- 1943 - 46,927,111
- 1944 - 37,952,600
- 1945 - 39,939,259
- 1946 - 43,466,407
- 1947 - 29,993,263
- 1948 - 88,323,540
- 1949 - 41,355,515
- 1950 - 32,759,468
- 1951 - 40,419,491
- 1952 - 1,013,477

Elizabeth II

- 1953 - 70,363,876
- 1954 - 105,241,150
- 1955 - 109,929,554
- 1956 - 109,841,555
- 1957 - 150,654,290
- 1958 - 123,518,527
- 1959 - 93,089,441
- 1960 - 103,288,346
- 1961 - 115,052,017
- 1962 - 178,359,637
- 1963 - 112,964,000
- 1964 - 152,336,000
- 1965 - 129,644,000
- 1966 - 175,696,000
- 1967 - 240,788,000
- 1970 - 750,476 (Proof Only)

== See also ==
- Sixpence (Australian coin)
- Sixpence (Irish coin)
- Sixpence (New Zealand coin)
- Touch pieces
