= Eloy Mestrelle =

French moneyer

Eloy Mestrelle, first name sometimes spelled Eloye (died 1578), was a French moneyer who was responsible for introducing milled coinage to England.

== Career ==
=== Rise ===
Eloy Mestrelle was born in Paris and by the late 1550s was employed by the French Mint. He left France in 1559 with his family, including a kinsman, Philip, and settled in London. The reason for his departure is unknown, but it has been suggested it was because he was out of favour with his superiors. It is also possible he had participated in counterfeiting and needed to leave Paris in a hurry. This suggestion is reinforced by a pardon granted by Elizabeth I on 24 March 1561 "for all treasons, felonies and offences committed before 1 March 1. Eliz. (1559) in respect of clipping or counterfeiting coin".

Mestrelle offered his services to the English court, and he was authorised by Elizabeth to set up the first coin press in England. Machine-struck, or milled, coinage was hitherto unknown in England, as all previously produced coins had been hammered. By June 1560 he was beginning to assemble the material needed for his machinery, and soon started working at the Tower Mint with the mint official William Blunt to produce coins which met all the necessary standards. Mestrelle's machinery began producing coins sometime after 8 November 1560, initially producing shillings, groats and half groats. During 1561 a number of gold half-pounds and crowns were also minted, though it is not clear whether these were pattern coins or coins minted for circulation, but it has been suggested these coins were minted in conjunction with the queen's visit to the mint.

On 24 October 1561 the traditional Trial of the Pyx took place, and it was decided to drop the old silver denominations in favour of new 6d, 3d, 1 1/2d and 3/4d coins. The new coinage was proclaimed on 15 November 1561, and Mestrelle was awarded an annual pension of £25, a sign of royal favour. The following eighteen months was Mestrelle's most productive period at the Tower mint, producing hundreds of thousands of silver coins, especially sixpences, which accounted for over three-quarters of his output. Other coinage produced in this period are silver threepences, three-farthings pieces, and a small number of gold coinage composed of half-pounds, crowns and halfcrowns.

=== Decline ===
1563 saw the plague come to London, and the mint was closed from that summer until the following spring. Thereafter, minting of silver sixpences and threepences resumed, but little silver came to the Mint and few coins were produced, either with Mestrelle's machinery or using more traditional methods. 1564 proved even worse, as Mestrelle's machinery broke down, and although hammered coin production increased Mestrelle did not resume minting coinage until late 1566.

Mestrelle minted a modest amount of coinage for the next two years until 1 September 1568 when his kinsman Philip Mestrelle was arrested for creating four Burgundian crowns that were counterfeit. At the 12 January 1569 City of London magistrates session Philip was convicted, and five days later he was hanged at Tyburn. Eloy was also implicated in the scheme, but his role was probably minor since he sought, and was granted, a pardon for his actions. Mestrelle was allowed to resume his work at the mint in late 1570, but he was working under considerable restrictions, including being made to work with inferior tools and dies. A medal struck by Mestrelle during this period is believed to be a plea to the queen - the obverse bears the inscription QUID NOS SINE TE (what are we without thee?) and the reverse bears QUID HOC SINE ARMIS (what is this without tools?).

A reorganisation of the mint in 1572 saw the Warden of the Mint Richard Martin given responsibility for much of the mint's work, including its financial affairs. Martin had no inclination to waste money on what he saw as expensive experiments, and after tests demonstrated Mestrelle's press to be far more inefficient than the traditional coin hammerers Martin shut down Mestrelle's machinery and deprived him of access to the mint. Mestrelle retained lodgings in the Tower, but was never to work there again. A letter dated 25 August 1572, and sent by Martin to Lord Treasurer Burghley details a variety of problems with Mestrelle ranging from non-payment of debts to difficulties with sightseers.

Nothing is known of Mestrelle's actions following his joblessness until October 1577, when he was arrested and charged with counterfeiting coins. Following his arrest, his belongings were seized and his family was evicted from his house. As it became clear that a conviction was likely, Mestrelle tried to save himself by implicating others supposedly involved with counterfeiting, but the Crown was not satisfied, and he was hanged in the spring of 1578.
