= English three farthing coin =

16th-century English coin

Three farthing
- Value: 3/4 of a penny
- Diameter: 14 mm

Obverse
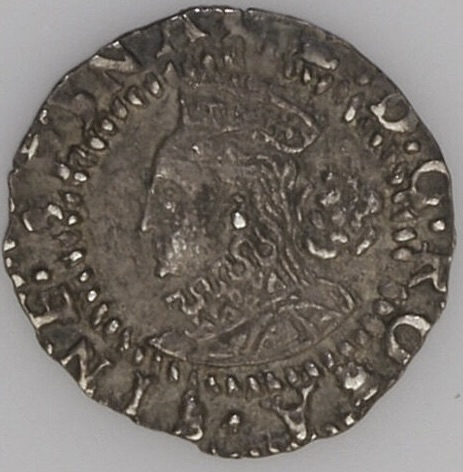

Reverse
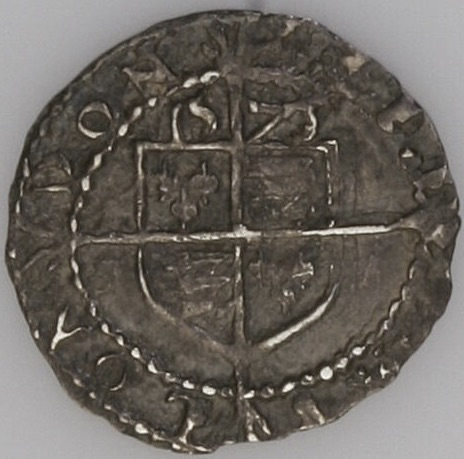
- Design: Royal arms over a cross with the date above

The silver three-farthing (3/4d) coin was introduced in Queen Elizabeth I's third and fourth coinages (1561–1582), as part of a plan to produce large quantities of coins of varying denominations and high metal content. It was worth 1/16 shilling, or 1/320 pound sterling.

The obverse shows a left-facing bust of the queen, with a rose behind her and the legend E D G ROSA SINE SPINA – Elizabeth, by the grace of God a rose without a thorn – while the reverse shows the royal arms with the date above the arms and a mint mark at the beginning of the legend reading CIVITAS LONDON – City of London, the Tower Mint.

The three-farthings coin closely resembles the three-halfpence coin, differing only in the diameter, which is 14 mm (0.55 in) for an unclipped coin, compared to 16 mm (0.63 in) for the three-halfpence.

All the coins are hammered, except for the extremely rare milled three-farthings of 1563, of which only three examples are known to exist.
