= Shilling (English coin) =

Silver coin of the Kingdom of England

The English shilling was a silver coin of the Kingdom of England, when first introduced known as the testoon. A shilling was worth twelve pence, and there were 20 shillings to the pound sterling. The English shilling was introduced in the 16th century and remained in circulation until it became the British shilling as the result of the Union of England and Scotland to form the Kingdom of Great Britain in 1707.

== Name ==
The word shilling comes from the Old English scilling (meaning to separate), an accounting term dating back to Anglo-Saxon times, to mean a 20th of a pound, although there was no specific coin of that value. A common misconception is that the word is a Norse loanword into English; however, it can be found in English laws many years before Norse incursions into Britain, for example the Law of Æthelberht, of Kent.

== History ==
=== Testoon ===
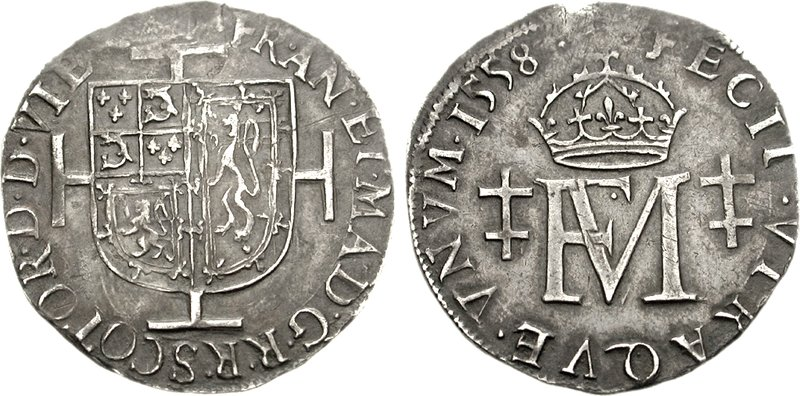
Mary & Francis Scottish testoon

In the Kingdom of England, during the reign of Henry VII, the forerunner of the shilling, the testoon, was introduced. This coin was produced in extremely small quantities between 1502 and 1504, and the fact that there are only four known dies for this issue (and four subsequent legend varieties, HENRICUS, HENRIC, HENRIC SEPTIM and HENRIC VII) shows clearly that the coins were not made for general circulation. They were made during the same period as the trials for the Profile issue of groats and half-groats, so they were probably trial pieces or patterns.

In the Kingdom of Scotland, during the reign of Mary, Queen of Scots, the testoon and half testoon were introduced to the Scottish coinage in 1553 and 1555 respectively. The 1553 is a Scottish rarity and Mary was presented with one (this piece was EF which sold for £61 during the 1850s Thornburn).

=== Henry VIII (1509–1547) ===
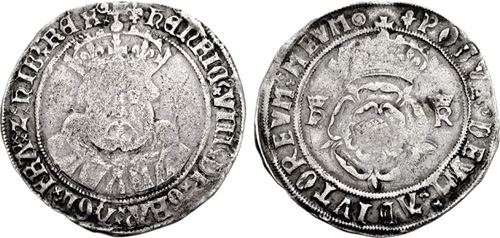
Henry VIII testoon

The testoon was struck in quantity during the last part of the reign of Henry VIII, with the Tower, Southwark and Bristol mints producing testoons in 1544–1551. These testoons were made in the very poor base silver in this period, and are known as base testoons. The coins were struck after Henry's death in 1547, at the Tower, Southwark, and at Bristol. Legend BRISTOLLIE and BRISTOLIE on reverse. BRISTOLIE are extremely rare and were struck pre- and post-death Henry VIII 1547 with WS monogram in legend. (One was recorded pre-WWII at 6.89 grams fully round, said to be from BRISTOL used as evidence at the trial of William Sharington.)

The mint-marks for these testoons are as follows:

TOWER (London)
- two lis OR
- lis OR
- pellet in annulet

Southwark
- S OR
- E

Bristol
- WS (for William Sharington)

The coins from Southwark have the reverse legend "CIVITAS LONDON" (City of London) and the Bristol coins the legend "CIVITAS BRISTOLLIE" (City of Bristol) or later "CIVITAS BRISTOLIE" (City of Bristol) The obverse of these coins shows a facing bust of Henry VIII and the reverse side, a crowned rose with [WS] in legend. Very Rare are any BRISTOL testoons which are full, round and not clipped or shaved.

=== Edward VI (1547–1553) ===
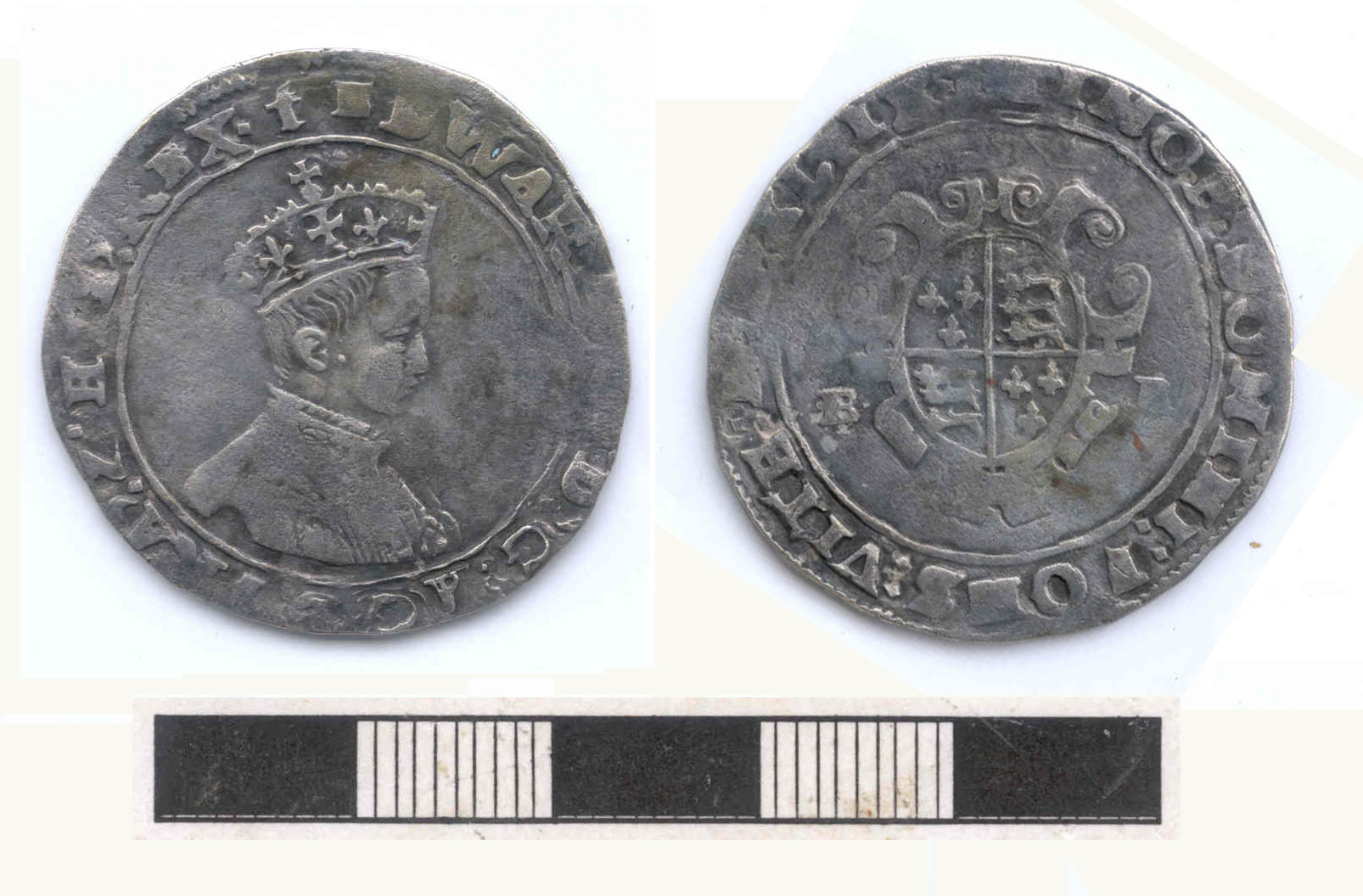
Edward VI shilling of 1549–50

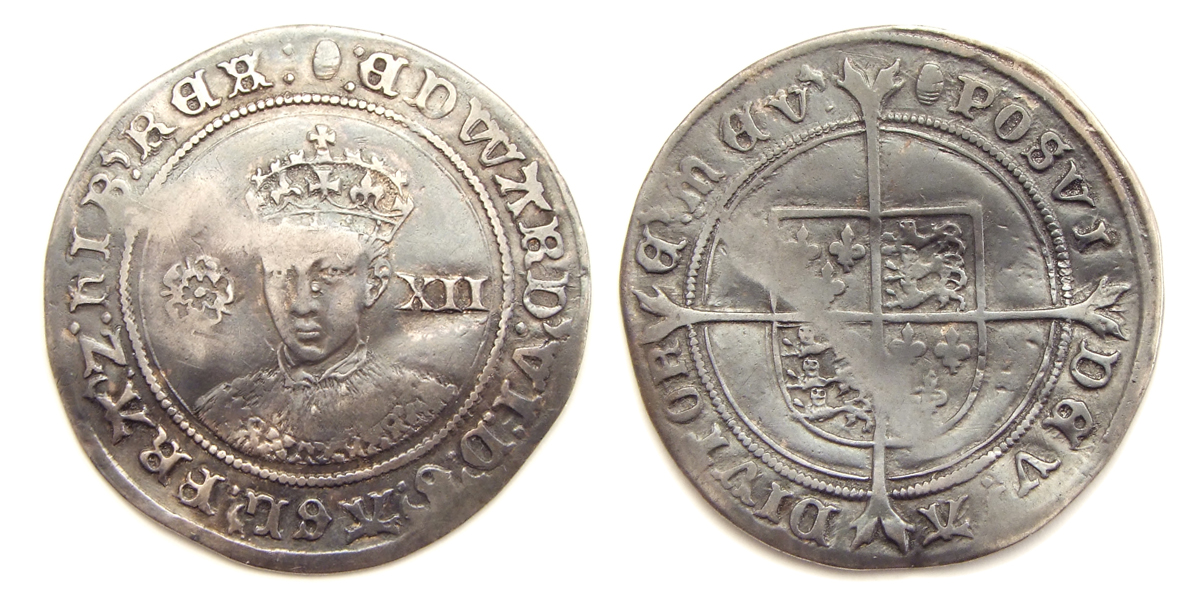
Edward VI shilling of 1551–53

Henry VIII's young son Edward VI continued the issues of base testoons. In his reign the testoons were called "shillings" for the first time, and the coins show the bust of the young boy king. Unlike his father's coins, the shillings of Edward VI cannot be differentiated by their reverse legend. There are six slightly different busts for these issues. Most importantly, these coins are the first English ones to carry the date, which is in Roman numerals. The coins were minted at the Durham House, Tower, Southwark, Canterbury and Bristol mints.

The mint-marks for these coins are:

Durham House MDXLVIII (1548)
- BOW
This issue is exceedingly rare and could be a pattern or contemporary forgery.

Durham House MDXLIX (1549)
- BOW

Tower MDXLIX (1549)
- ARROW OR
- GRAPPLE OR
- PHEON OR
- SWAN

Southwark MDXLIX (1549)
- Y OR
- EY

Canterbury MDXLIX (1549)
- ROSE OR
- T

Bristol MDXLIX (1549)
- TC

Tower MDL (1550)
- LION OR
- LIS OR
- PHEON AND
- SWAN OR
- MARLET OR
- CROWNED LEOPARD'S HEAD

Southwark MDL (1550)
- Y OR
- LIS AND Y

Tower MDLI (1551)
- LION AND ROSE OR
- ROSE AND ROSE

Southwark MDLI (1551)
- Y AND LIS

Undated issue (Durham House)
- BOW

==== Fine silver issue ====
In 1551, the silver standard was restored from about 0.342 silver to the (thence) normal 0.925 "sterling" silver. It was struck in large quantities but is normally found fairly worn and sometimes holed.

Mint-marks:

Tower or Southwark. No date (1551)
- Y

Tower. No date (1551–3)
- TUN

=== Mary (1553–1558) and Philip (1554–1558) ===
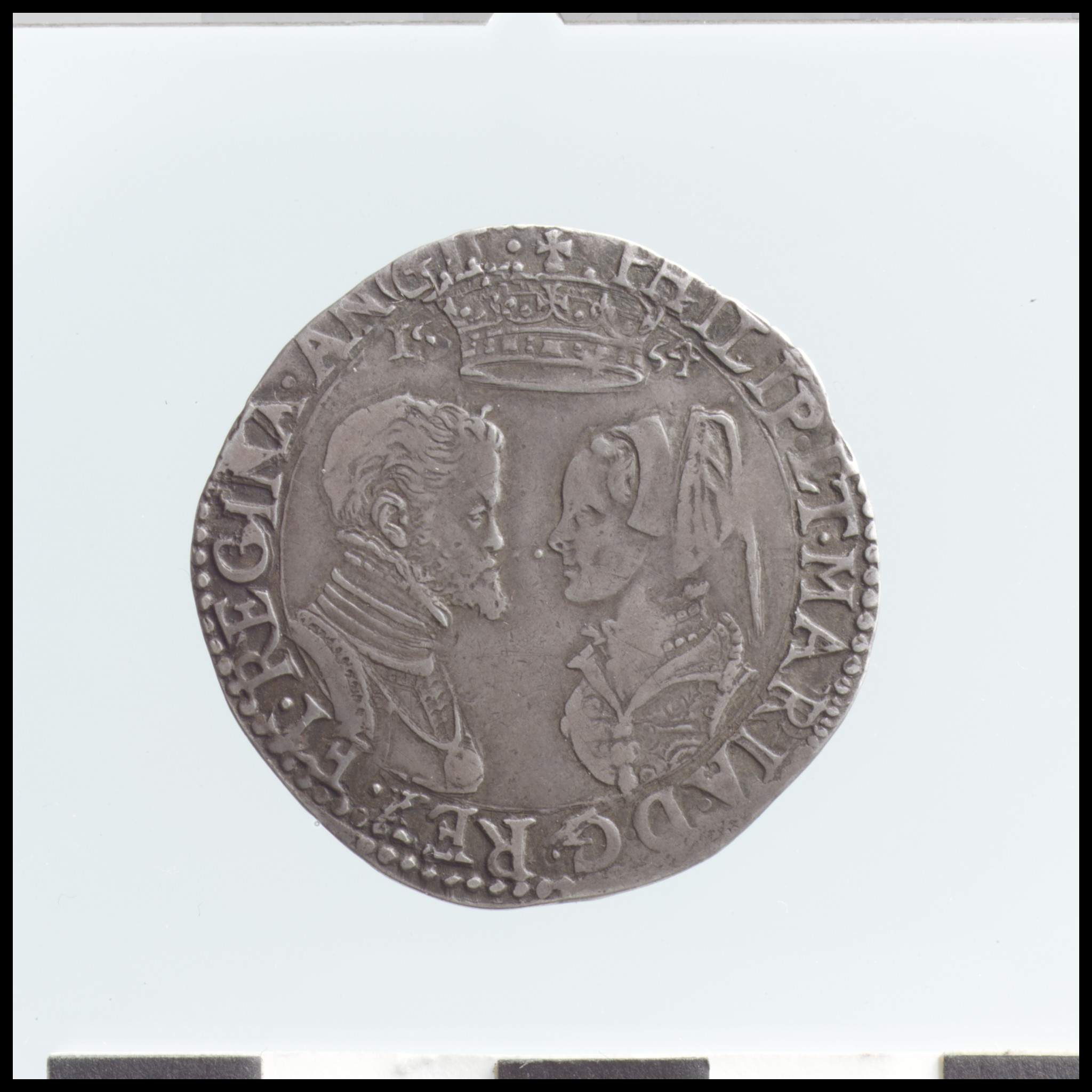
English shilling of Mary and Philip, 1554

No shillings were struck in England until Queen Mary I of England was married in 1554 to Philip of Spain, though Irish shillings with Mary's portrait were struck in 1553 and 1554 before her marriage.

After Mary's marriage some shillings were coined. To boost Philip's popularity his bust was placed on these coins, facing Mary's. These coins are fairly rare, but nevertheless do frequently appear on the market. There are two main varieties: Spanish titles (which adds on "Prince and Princess of Spain") and English titles. Many of these coins were dated using Arabic dates and some coins have a mark of value (X__II) above the royal shield. There is an exceedingly rare variety which has the date under the busts. All the coins were made at the Tower mint.

=== Elizabeth I (1558–1603) ===
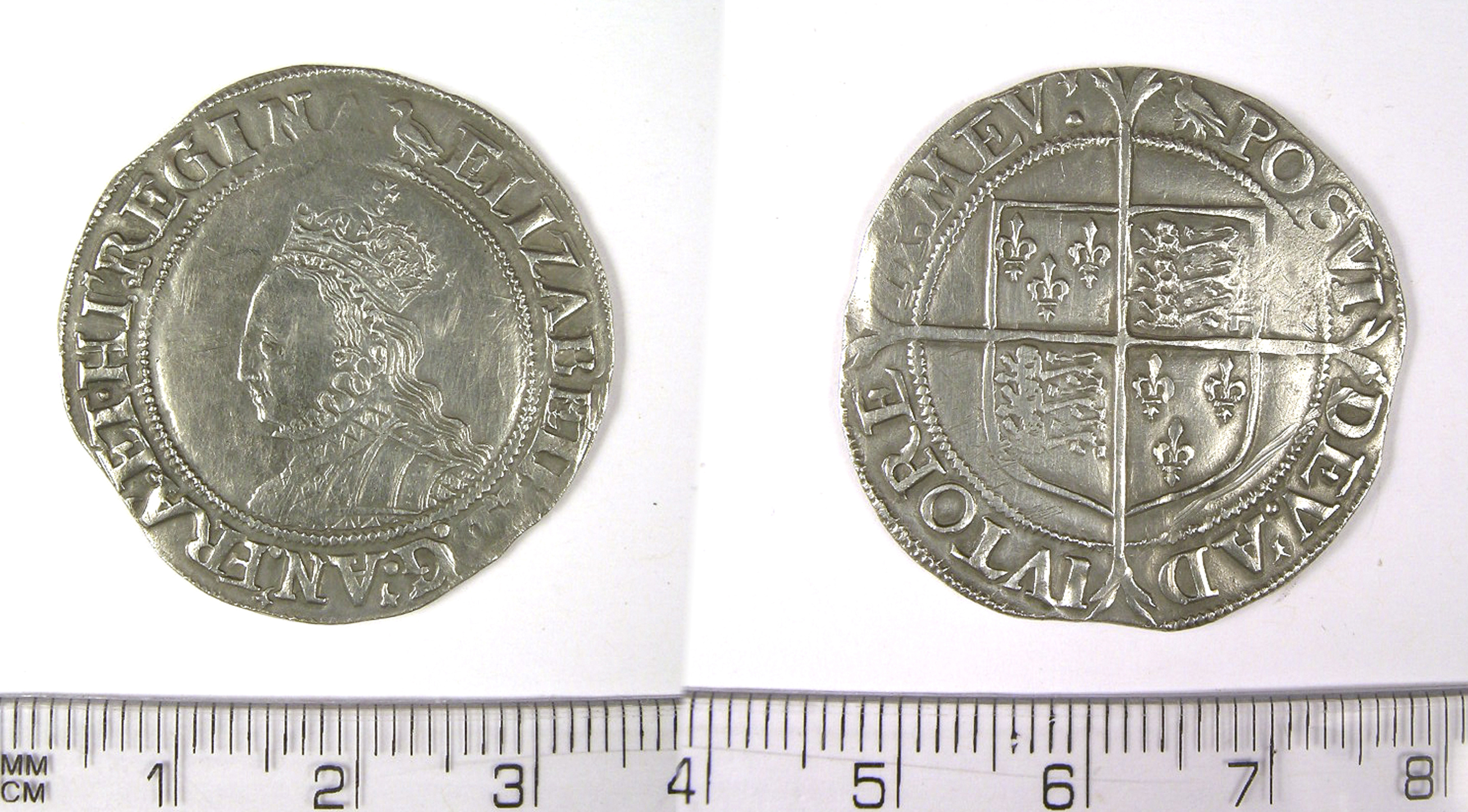
Shilling of Elizabeth I (1560–61 issue with martlet mintmark)

One of the first events of Elizabeth I's reign was the counter-marking of the Edward VI shillings to revalue them to their true worth. These coins have the counter-mark of a portcullis or greyhound and are extremely rare. The coins with the portcullis counter-mark were revalued at fourpence halfpenny, and the coins with the greyhound were revalued at twopence farthing.

A major recoinage was then embarked upon, with thousands of silver coins being produced. The shilling was no exception with the date being removed from the design. (However, mint-marks can be used to reveal the date.) No shillings were produced between 1562 and 1582, but the next issue was also very large and a good number have survived for collectors.

Mint-marks:

Hammered issue (all coins were produced in the Tower)

- Lis (1559–1560)
- Cross crosslet (1560–61)
- Marlet (1560–61)
- Bell (1582–83)
- A (1582–84)
- Escallop (1584–86)
- Crescent (1587–89)
- Hand (1590–92)
- Tun (1592–95)
- Woolpack (1594–96)
- Key (1595–98)
- Anchor (1597–1600)
- 1 (1601)
- 2 (1602)

Milled issue (Tower mint only)
- Star (1560–1)

The milled issue was produced by Eloye Mestrelle using horse power. The issues were a success, especially the sixpences, but he lost his post over various disputes with the mint workers. Although Eloye found it very difficult to make smaller coins the sixpences and shillings were made in fairly large quantities. The shillings still tend to be much rarer than sixpences and are often found weakly struck, gilded, holed, mounted etc. They are still available to collectors, albeit in poor condition.

=== James I (1603–1625) ===
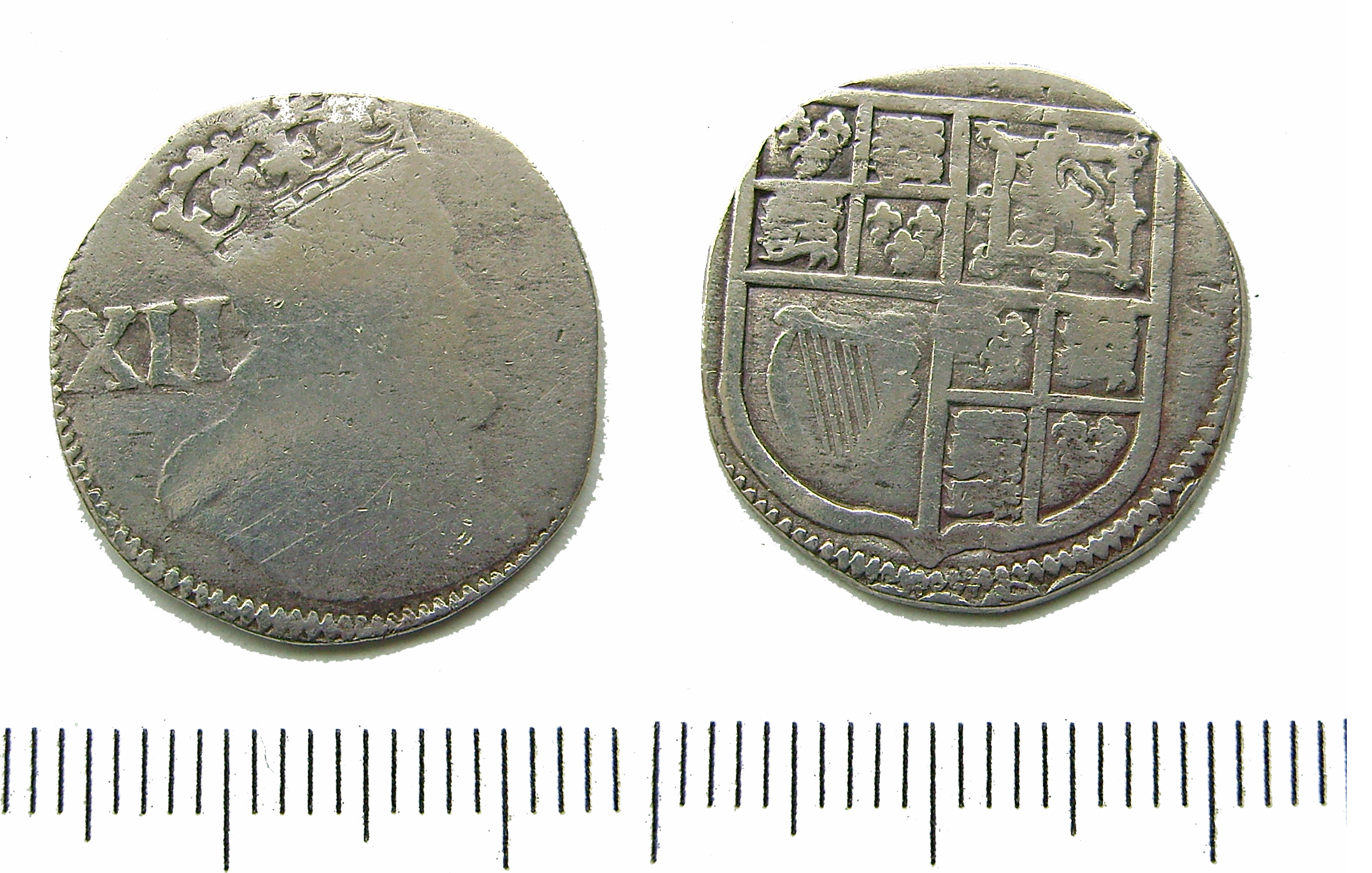
James I shilling, badly worn

During the reign of James I, coinage continued in much the same way as in Elizabeth's but the coins have a mark of value (XII) in front of the bust. Some shillings were struck with a plume above the shield (Welsh silver).

The mint-marks for these coins are:

First coinage (reverse legend Exurgat deus dissipentur inimici)
- Lis (1603–4)
- Thistle (1603–4)

Second coinage (reverse legend Quae deus coniunxit nemo seperat, square cut beard)
- Lis (1604–5)
- Rose (1604–6)
- Escallop (1606–7)
- Grapes (1607)
- Coronet (1607–9)
- Key (1609–10)
- Mullet (1611–2)
- Tower (1612–3)
- Trefoil (1613)
- Tun (1613–5)
- Cinquefoil (1613–5)
- Closed book (1615–6)
- Plain cross (1617–18)

Third coinage (very long curly hair)
- Spur Rowel (1619–20)
- Rose (1620–1)
- Thistle (1621–3)
- Lis (1623–4)
- Trefoil (1624)

Welsh issues (with plume above shield)
- Thistle (1621–3)
- Lis (1623–4)
- Trefoil (1624)

=== 1625 to 1706 ===
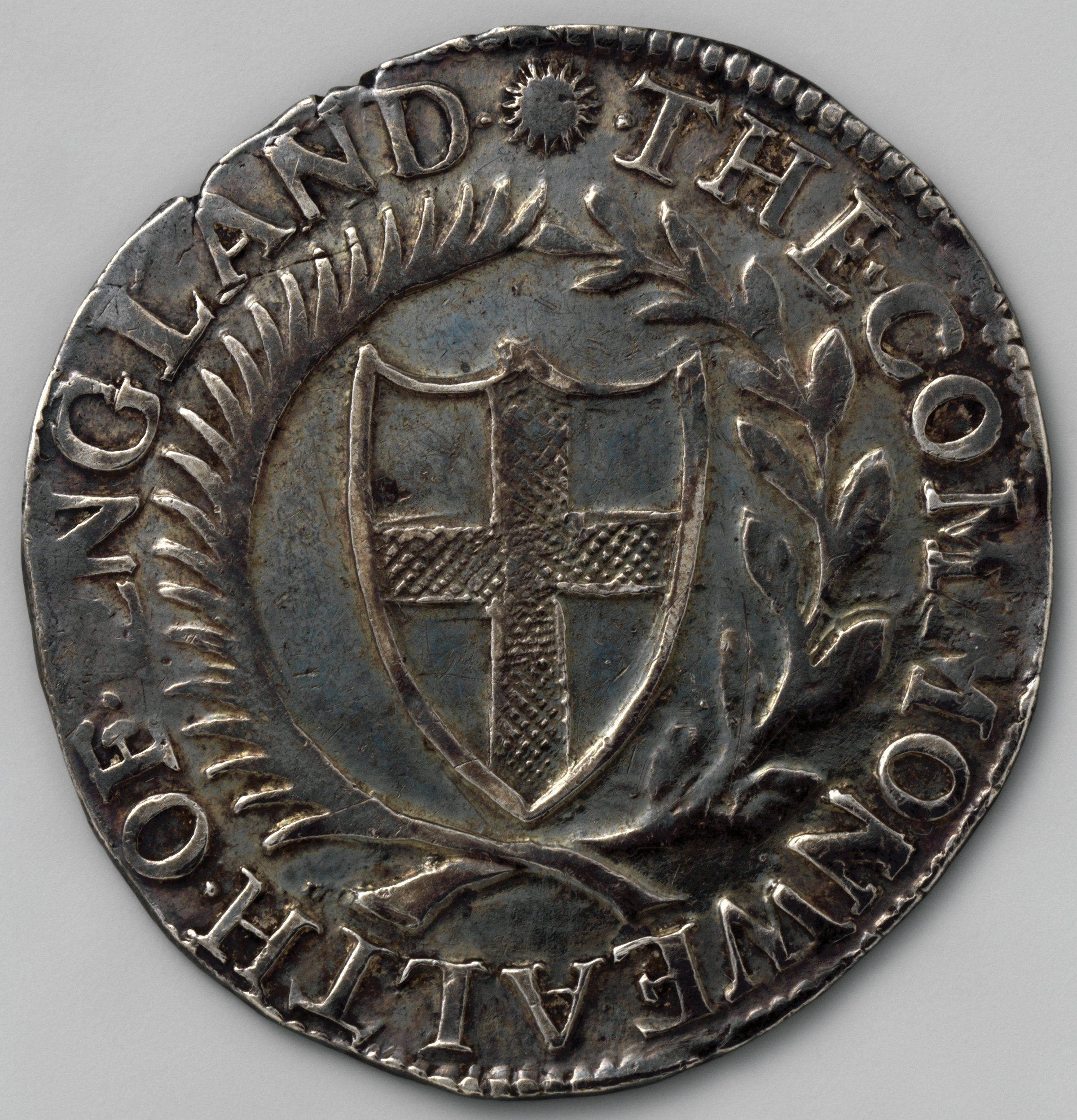
Shilling of the Commonwealth, 1659

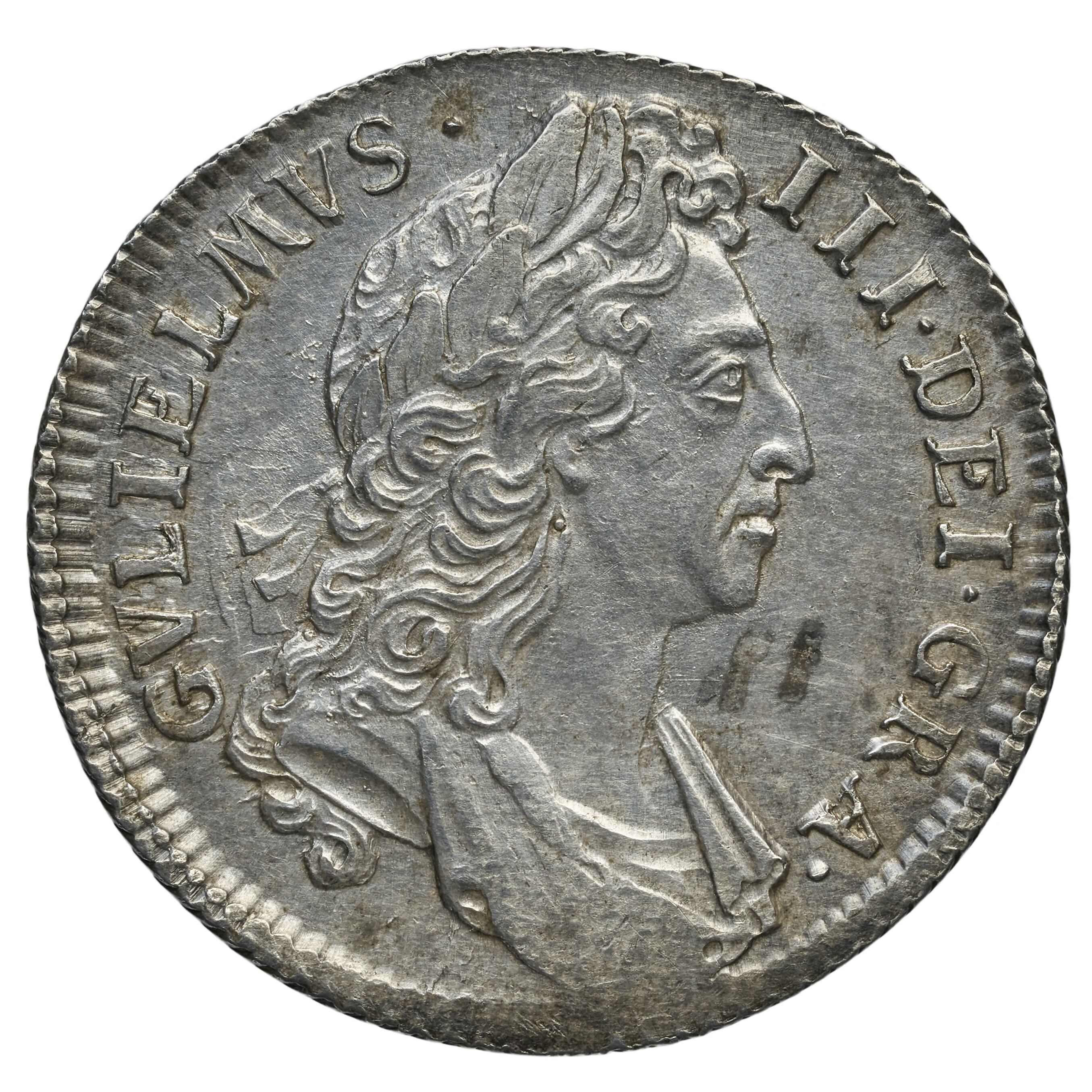
William III shilling, 1696

Shillings were minted in every subsequent reign as well as during the Commonwealth period.

From 1707, as the result of the Union of England and Scotland to form the Kingdom of Great Britain, the English shilling was converted into the British shilling.

== See also ==
- Numismatics
- Pound sterling
