= Brass threepence =

British coin (1937–1970)

Threepence
- United Kingdom
- Value: £0.0125
- Mass: 6.804 g
- Diameter: 21.0 mm (between opposite sides); 21.6 mm (between opposite corners)
- Thickness: 2.25 mm
- Edge: Plain
- Composition: Brass (79% Cu, 20% Zn, 1% Ni)
- Years of minting: 1937–1970

Obverse
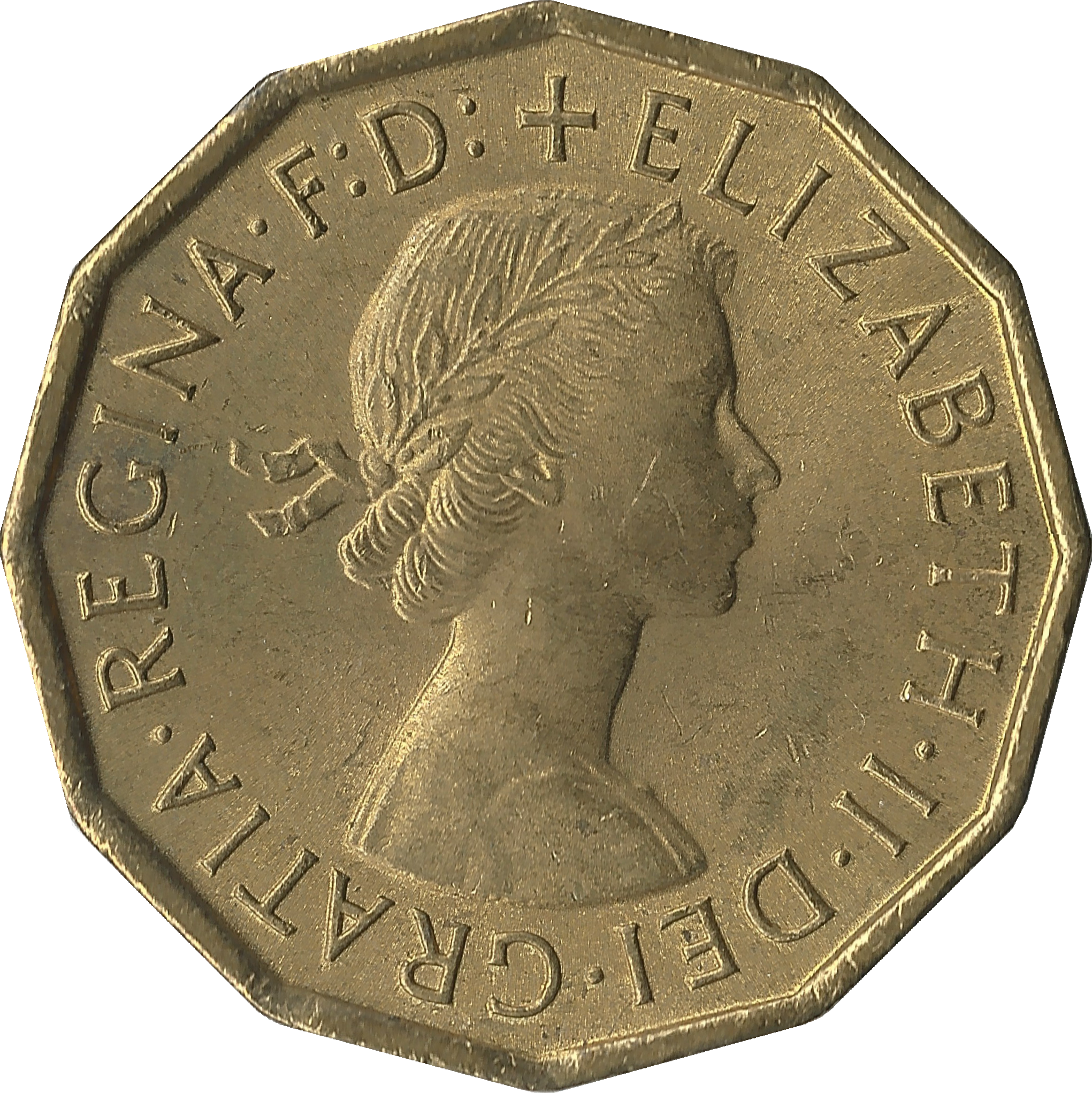
- Design: Profile of the monarch (Elizabeth II shown)

Reverse
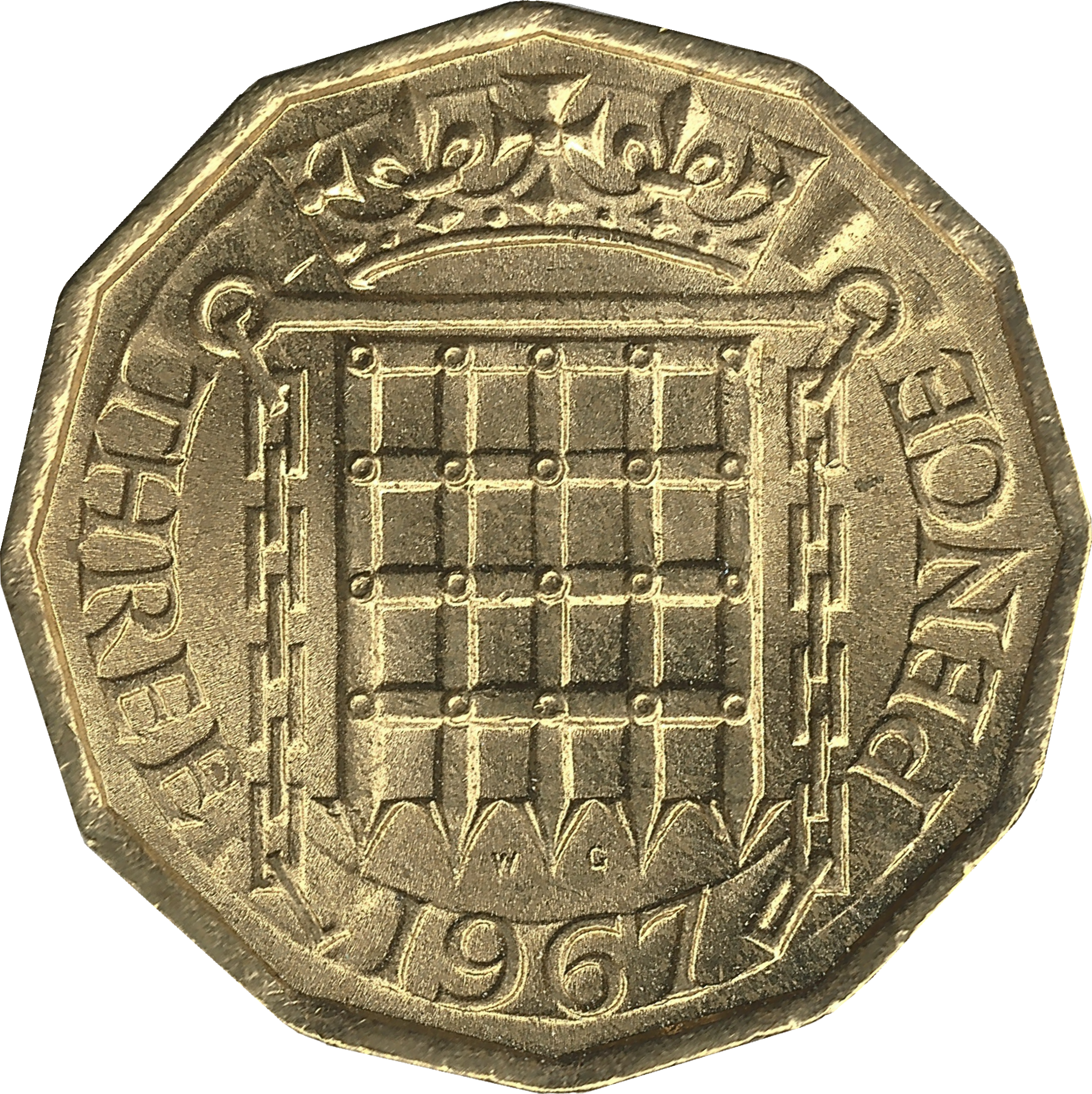
- Design: Various (Tudor portcullis shown)

The brass threepence, or "threepenny bit", is a twelve-sided British coin equivalent to 1/80 of a pound, was struck between 1937 and 1967, with a final issue for collectors dated 1970. It was the first British coin that was not round.

By the mid-1930s, the heavy weight of the bronze penny and its fractions had become an issue for firms, such as transport companies, that dealt with them in bulk. The silver threepence was unpopular in the United Kingdom due to its small size. The Royal Mint decided on a brass twelve-sided coin readily distinguishable from other coins due to its size, shape and colour. The initial reverse design by Frances Madge Kitchener, depicting a thrift plant, was altered at the direction of the Royal Mint by Percy Metcalfe without Kitchener's knowledge, but threatened legal action by her was settled with a joint statement to the press.

The new coin was slow to circulate when released to the public in 1937, but eventually gained the public's liking, so much so that the silver threepence was discontinued in 1945. A new design, with a crowned portcullis, was instituted for Elizabeth II's initial coinage in 1953. The coin continued in commerce until the decimalisation of the pound in 1971, after which it rapidly vanished from circulation and lost its status as legal tender after 31 August 1971.

== Inception ==
Although there was a silver threepence in circulation in the 1930s, it was unpopular in the UK and especially in London. The penny and its fractions were made of bronze, and were heavy in bulk—London Transport handled, as part of its traffic receipts, 600 tons of bronze coin annually. The obvious solution would be to reduce the size and weight of the bronze coins, but this was impractical due to the large number of automatic machines activated by pennies, and that upwards of 3,000,000,000 pieces would need to be recoined. The Royal Mint had replaced the earlier, heavier copper coinage beginning in 1860, but in the 1930s this would be a much larger task, with the resultant coins worth much less in purchasing power than three-quarters of a century before.

The silver threepence, had it been more popular, might have taken some of the burden borne by the bronze coins, but that only exchanged three pennies that lay heavy in pocket or purse for a small coin, easy to lose. The silver threepence was thin and easily bent, adding to public dislike. It remained popular in Scotland and Wales, and its colonial equivalent met with no hostility in the dominions, such as Australia and South Africa. The Royal Mint concluded, though, that it could not make the silver threepence popular in the UK, and looked elsewhere for a solution.

In February 1936, London Transport proposed the issuance of a more convenient threepence; this was in accord with the Royal Mint's thinking on the subject. After study, the Royal Mint decided to issue a larger threepence, somewhere in size between the small silver threepence and the weight of three pennies. The other constraint on the new coin was that it not be easily mistaken for one of the existing coins, either by humans or by automatic machines. It should therefore be easily distinguishable even by a drunken reveller in the dark. After considering a white metal coin midway in size between the penny and halfpenny, the Royal Mint decided on a twelve-sided piece in a yellow metal midway in size between the sixpence and shilling. The Royal Mint rejected London Transport's idea of having a hole in the middle of the new coin, as such a piece could not bear the portrait of the monarch, but looked with favour at giving it a distinctive shape. All British coins to this point had been round.

The brass alloy used for the new threepence was 79 per cent copper, 20 per cent zinc and 1 per cent nickel. A similar alloy, with tin substituted for nickel, was already in use for coining colonial issues, but the nickel was added for hardness, and the alloy for colonial issues soon altered. The use of 12 sides allowed round blanks to be used, and to be squeezed into shape by the coinage machinery as the coin was struck. The Mint had considered a coin with a scalloped edge, but this had been rejected by its advisory Standing Committee on Coins, Medals, and Decorations as "wobbly", and the twelve-sided shape was adopted after consultation with foreign mints that produced coins that were not round, and after assurances from London Transport that a twelve-sided coin could be used in automatic machines.

The fact that the new coin was twelve-sided allowed it to be distinguished by touch. After initial trial pieces were struck for distribution and testing by stakeholders, the Mint received word that the proposed coin could activate some machines instead of the sixpence or shilling. In reaction, it made the coin thicker, too thick to pass through the coin slot of such machines. Even with the increase, one of the new threepenny bits weighed 6.804 g, less than a quarter of the weight of threepence in pennies.

== Designs ==
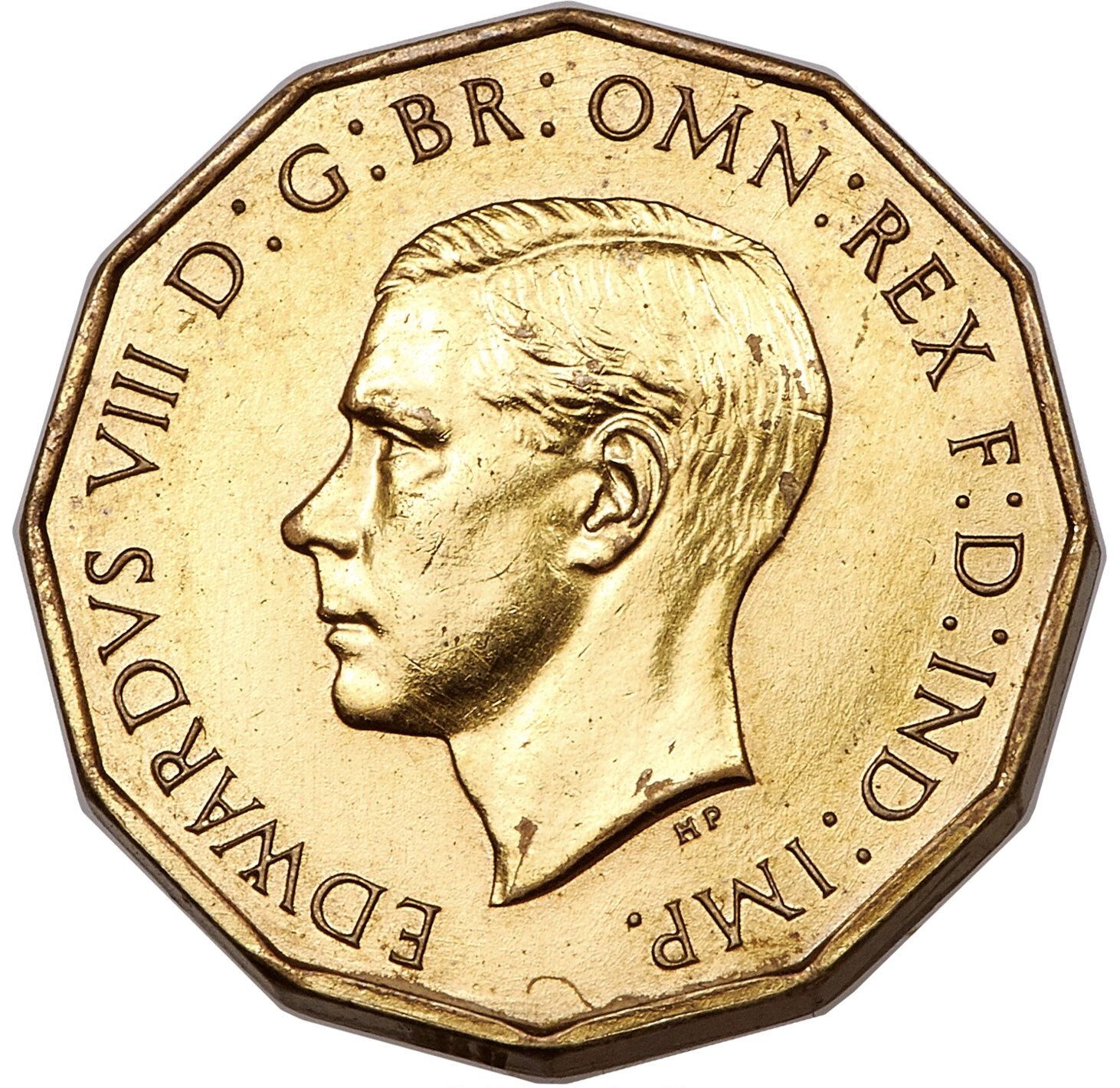
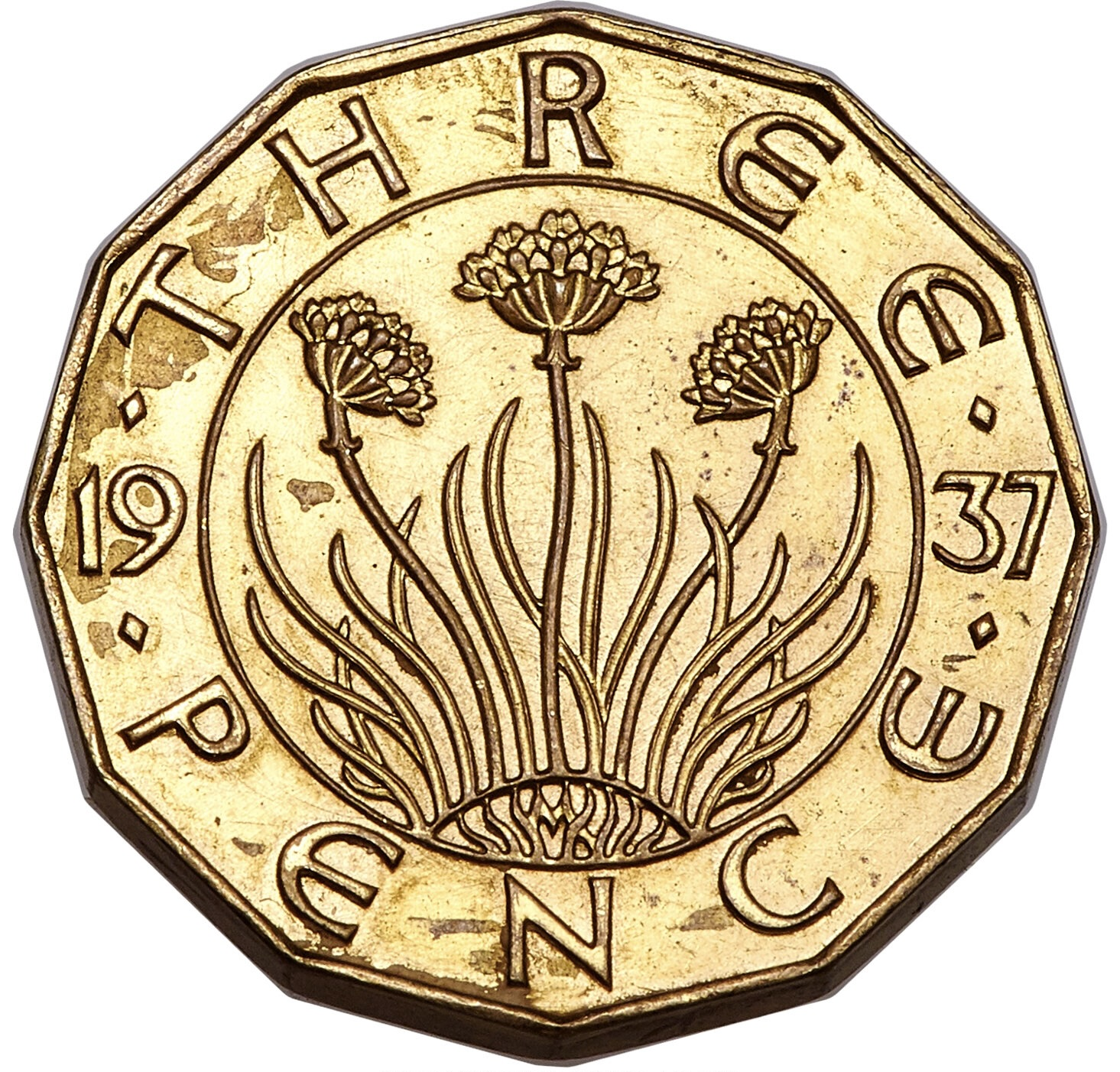
Edward VIII pattern coin, including Kitchener's reverse design

The initial obverse, depicting King Edward VIII, was by Thomas Humphrey Paget, a sculptor who had impressed the king (then Prince of Wales) a year earlier with Edward's effigy on a medal for the Master Mariners' Company, of which Edward was president. By the time of King Edward's abdication in December 1936, many of the reverse designs for the new coinage were well advanced, and Paget was able to complete a new effigy of the new king, George VI. Edward had demanded that he face left on his coinage, as had his father and predecessor, George V, breaking with the usual custom that successive British monarchs face in opposite directions on their coinages. George VI also faces left, preserving the custom, and making it seem that Edward would have faced right, had his coinage been issued for circulation.

Selected for the reverse of the brass threepence was a design by Frances Madge Kitchener, niece of the First World War general. She was one of the first woman artists to come to the attention of the Royal Mint, through the competition to design a medal for the 1924 British Empire Exhibition. Her design was originally considered for the silver threepence. Kitchener's design was submitted in June 1936–the coinage was being redesigned for issues bearing the head of King Edward–and bore a thrift plant. She was asked to rework the design to make the plants appear less delicate, and the Royal Mint had doubts a design originally intended for a small silver coin would work well for a thick brass one.

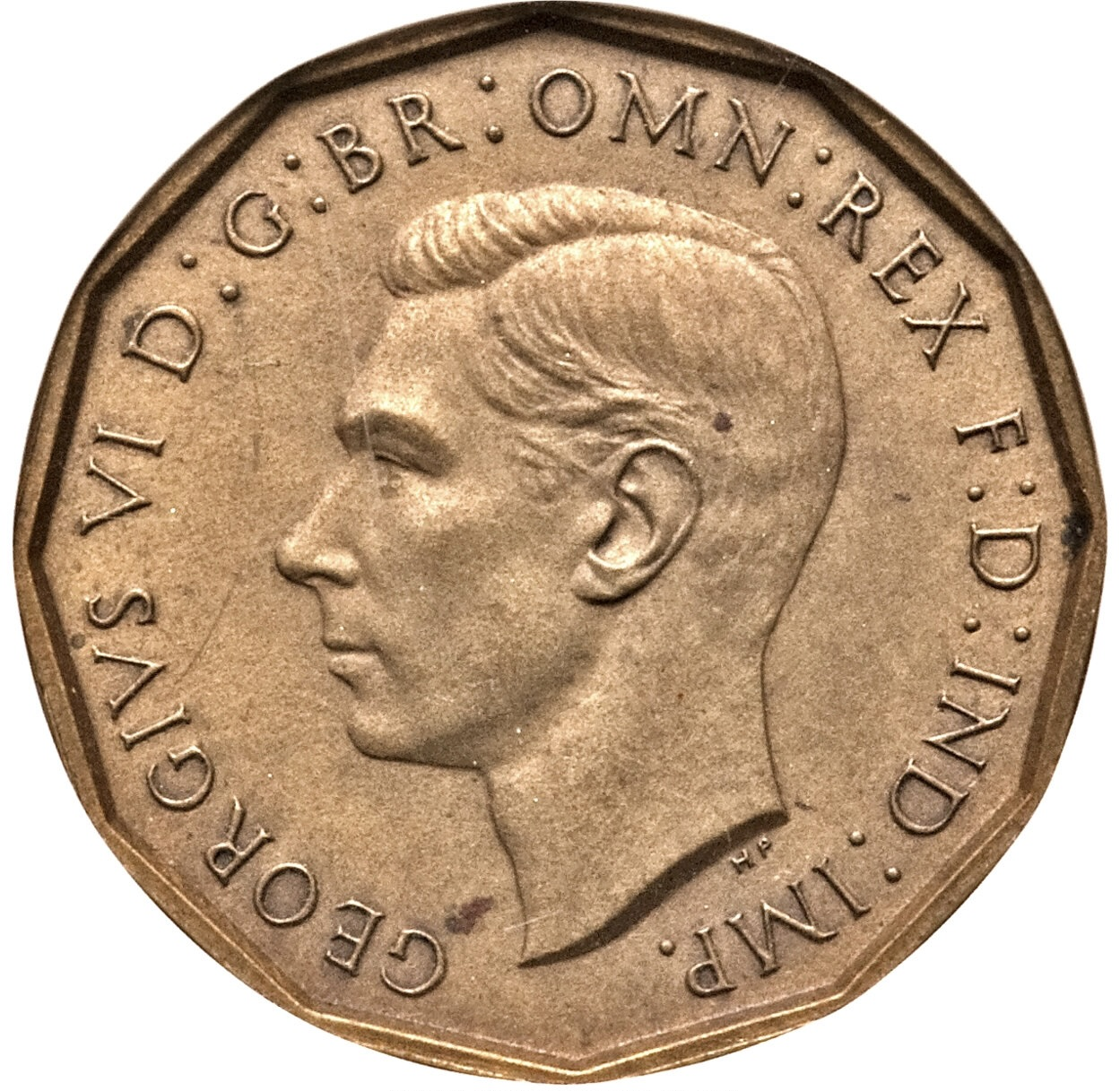
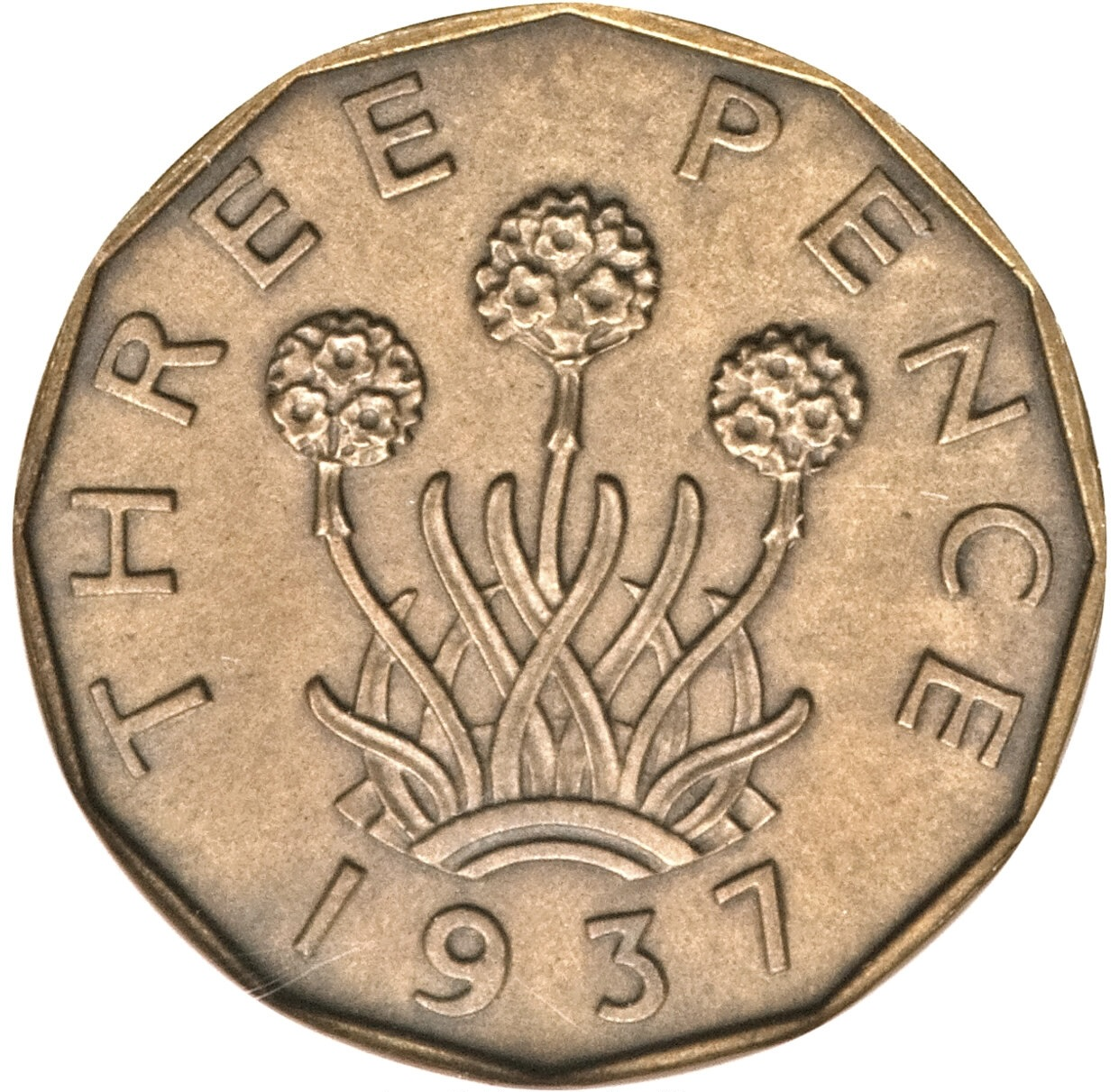
George VI threepence, including Metcalfe's reverse design

Kitchener's design was modified by Percy Metcalfe, designer of the 1928 Irish coinage, with a simpler, more heraldic rendering, one with the leaves of the plant more obviously stylised with something of an art deco look. According to the Royal Mint Museum, Kitchener's "moment of triumph was taken away from her by the then Deputy Master of The Royal Mint (Robert A. Johnson) who, behind her back, instructed another artist to rework the design. Clearly badly affected by the incident, Kitchener disappeared from the artistic scene, but she deserves more credit than she has previously been given."

The Standing Committee was asked to choose between the two versions, and voted 7–4 for Metcalfe's. However, though Kitchener was sent a cheque for £50 by post, she was not informed that her design had been changed, and when she saw Metcalfe given credit for the new threepence in the press, threatened the Royal Mint with legal action. This was resolved, after the release of the coin, by a statement in the newspapers; Johnson and Kitchener ascribed the design change to technical considerations connected with the need to make the coin thicker, something that had not at first been contemplated.

With the accession of Elizabeth II in 1952, coinage redesign took place, and beginning in 1953, the brass threepence bore a portrait of the queen by Mary Gillick with a reverse design depicting a Tudor portcullis, created by William Gardner. The proclamation dated 25 November 1952 that made her new coins a legal tender described the reverse as a "Portcullis with chains, ensigned with a royal coronet, being a Badge of Our Royal Predecessor King Henry VII". The portcullis badge had also been adopted by the Houses of Parliament. A complete change from the curved floral design of the George VI threepence, the new reverse design was angular, in keeping with the angular edge of the coin.

== Production ==
=== Edward VIII ===
One of the great rarities of British numismatics, some 18 Edward VIII threepences exist. These were distributed by the Royal Mint for use in testing of the new coin by makers of coin-operated machines, and were not returned. The Royal Mint was awaiting final approval of the new coins to begin full production when King Edward abdicated.

In Edward's later life as Duke of Windsor, he was unsuccessful in obtaining one of the surviving sets of coins designed for him. The numismatic author, Richard Lobel, related that Edward did own one of the threepences, though it was not found among the effects upon his death or that of Edward's wife Wallis. Lobel stated that he was told by John J. Ford Jr of the New Netherlands Coin Company that Ford and his partner, Charles Wormser, had sold Edward one, and the duke took five months to pay.

=== George VI ===
By proclamation dated 18 March 1937, the brass threepence was made legal tender for up to two shillings. That proclamation also stated the new coin's designs. The new coin was 21.0 mm in diameter between opposite sides, and 21.6 mm between opposite corners. They were placed in circulation for the first time when they were used as part of the Royal Maundy distribution on 25 March. By the end of July, some 20,000,000 had been struck, though as the initial ones tended to be retained as novelties, they were scarce in circulation. The silver threepence continued to be issued to areas where it was popular. Rumours that there was a punctuation error on the obverse of the brass threepence and the issue would soon be recalled also added to the initial public hoarding, despite official denials.

According to Richard Farmer in his journal article on the introduction of the brass threepence, the public gave it "at best, a lukewarm reception". The Manchester Guardian suggested the coin looked like it was made in Japan, to which a reader writing to The Observer dissented, stating it looked Chinese instead. What positive press reaction there was focused on its utility, not on its appearance.

The Mint tried to increase the new coin's circulation. Efforts by London Transport to give it as change were initially frustrated by bus conductors who preferred to give three heavy pennies as change and retain the lighter threepence, but special instructions were issued to give the coin as change. In April 1938, the Post Office was also asked to promote the use of the brass threepence, but had difficulty obtaining adequate stocks from local banks. More effective were requests to other government departments to include the brass threepence in pay packets; by November 1938, the Admiralty was paying out 35,000 new brass threepences per week. Its popularity also benefited from a shortage of pennies in the early 1940s—to conserve copper, pennies largely ceased to be struck from 1940 for 3 1/2 years, though some were coined for use in the colonies.

The public took time to like the brass threepence, and it may have been the blackouts of the Second World War that made it popular, due to its distinctive shape. The ease with which it could be found in a handful of change helped overcome the initial suspicion with which it was met by the public, and helped make it one of Britain's best-loved coins. Wartime issues were struck from 1941 at a temporary mint located at Pinewood Studios—the Royal Mint, then located near the London docks, was vulnerable to bombing, and amid great secrecy, base metal coinage was made at the temporary site. The silver threepence was discontinued after 1945, once the brass piece had been widely accepted, with those minted after 1941 mostly for circulation in the West Indies.

The collars used to shape the brass threepence were made initially with sharp corners, but this led to metal fatigue in the collars, and with steel scarce during the war, rounded corners were used instead. After the war, with steel becoming more available, the sharp corners were restored. Some of each year's production between 1941 and 1949 were struck with rounded collars. Beginning in 1948, IND IMP, for "Emperor of India", was omitted from the inscription on the obverse.

The brass threepence was struck each year from 1937 to 1952, except 1947. In 1947, there was only a small demand for the denomination, which the Royal Mint supplied from stocks on hand, and thus none were struck with that date.

=== Elizabeth II and abolition ===
Elizabeth II's new coins were first available in a "plastic set" containing all the new circulating coinage at a slight advance on face value, with the circulating threepence and the proof set available later in 1953. Nevertheless, it was the first coin issued to depict Elizabeth. Minor modifications, including the omission of the words BRITT OMN (all the Britains), followed for the 1954 issue.

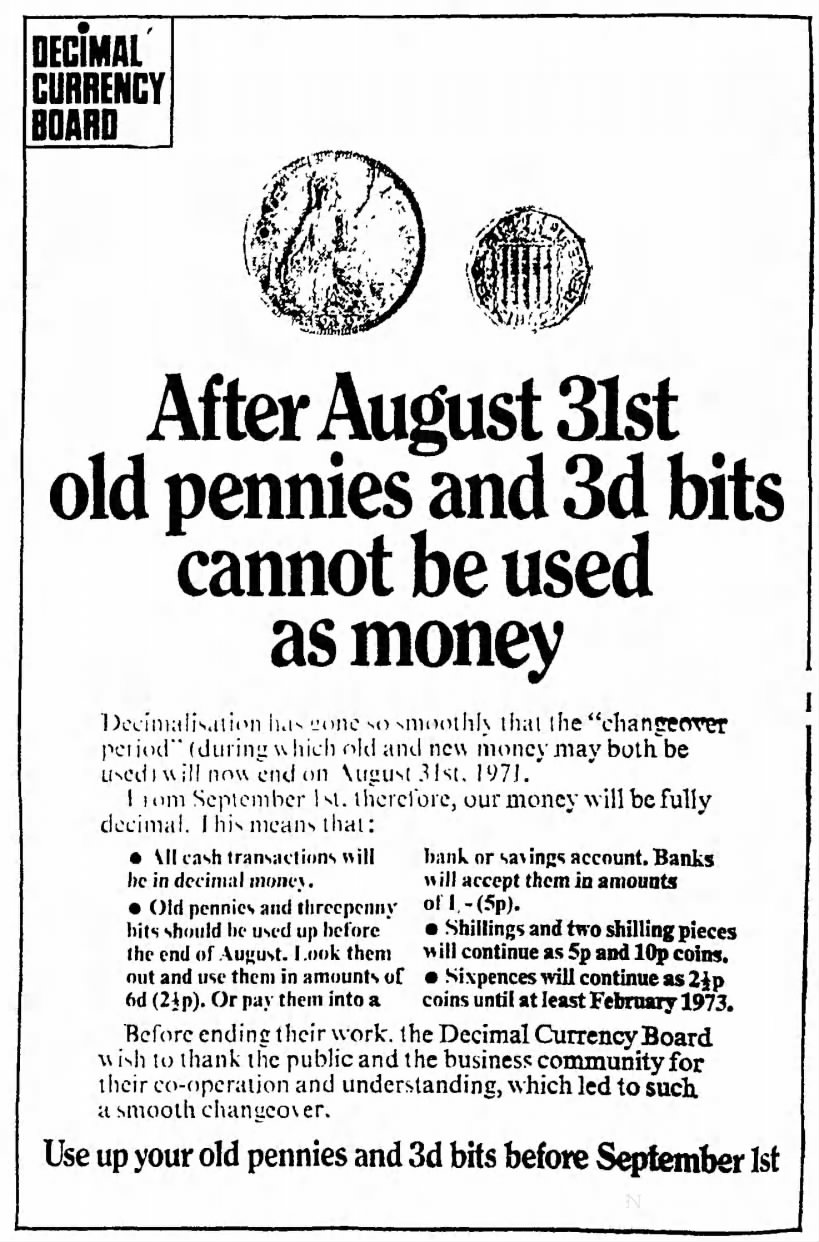
Decimal Currency Board advertisement informing the public that the threepenny bit would soon cease to be legal tender, August 1971

Threepence coins were struck each year from 1953 to 1967. It continued to be struck after 1967, but the date was not changed, to discourage hoarding.

After decimalisation of the pound on 15 February 1971, the threepence had no place in the monetary system, and it quickly vanished from use; by the end of March, only 3 per cent of retail shops were using it to give change. It vanished so quickly that the planned transition period of 18 months was cut, and it ceased to be legal tender after 31 August 1971, though banks continued to accept them as deposits for a period of six months, especially from charities, which would have had difficulty clearing all boxes to meet the 31 August deadline. At the final meeting of the Decimal Currency Board on 27 September, it was announced that of the £11 million in threepenny bits known to be in circulation, only £8,570,000 had so far been paid in to the banks. The Evening Standard eulogised the threepenny bit as "surely one of the strangest coins ever to appear in circulation".

== Collecting ==
Of the threepenny bits issued for circulation, few are valuable today. Of the George VI issues, the 1946 and 1949 carry a premium, and the 1939 a smaller one. For Elizabeth II issues, Spink's Coins of England and the United Kingdom gives values for coins in pristine condition only, with the greatest worth assigned to the 1958 at £15 in brilliant uncirculated condition and minimum worth assigned to any circulation issue after 1960.

A 1970-dated piece was issued in proof condition as part of the final issue of pre-decimal coins for collectors.

== Sources ==
- Craig, John (1950). Seventy-eighth Annual Report of the Deputy Master and Comptroller of the Royal Mint 1947. London: His Majesty's Stationery Office. OCLC 867857409.
- Craig, John (2010) [1953]. The Mint: A History of the London Mint from A.D. 287 to 1948 (paperback ed.). Cambridge, Cambridgeshire: Cambridge University Press. ISBN 978-0-521-17077-2.
- Dyer, G.P.; Gaspar, P.P. (1992). "Reform, the New Technology and Tower Hill". In Challis, C.E. (ed.). A New History of the Royal Mint. Cambridge, Cambridgeshire: Cambridge University Press. pp. 398–606. ISBN 978-0-521-24026-0.
- Farmer, Richard (Spring 2017). "'That Alien, New-fangled, Thick, Intractable Dodecagon': The Design and Introduction of the 1937 British Threepenny Coin". History Workshop Journal (83): 194–216. JSTOR 44645664.
- Johnson, Robert (1937). Sixty-sixth and Sixty-seventh Annual Reports of the Deputy Master and Comptroller of the Royal Mint 1935 and 1936. London: His Majesty's Stationery Office.
- Linecar, Howard W.A. (1977). British Coin Designs and Designers. London: G. Bell & Sons. ISBN 978-0-7135-1931-0.
- Lobel, Richard, ed. (1999) [1995]. Coincraft's Standard Catalogue English & UK Coins 1066 to Date (5th ed.). London: Standard Catalogue Publishers. ISBN 978-0-9526228-8-8.
- Lobel, Richard (December 2015). "Enigmatic Edward VIII Coins". The Numismatist: 14–15.
- Peck, C. Wilson (1960). English Copper, Tin and Bronze Coins in the British Museum 1558–1958. London: Trustees of the British Museum. OCLC 906173180.
- Schwager, David (October 2015). "Missing Monarch Found: The Coinage of King Edward VIII". The Numismatist: 52–59.
- Seaby, Peter (1985). The Story of British Coinage. London: B. A. Seaby. ISBN 978-0-900652-74-5.
- Spink & Son (2022). Coins of England and the United Kingdom, Predecimal Issues 2023 (58th ed.). London: Spink & Son. ISBN 978-1-912667-91-8.
