= Shilling (British coin) =

Former unit of currency of the United Kingdom and other territories

One shilling
- United Kingdom
- Value: 12d (1548–1971); 5 new pence (1971–1990)
- Mass: (1816–1970) 5.66 g
- Diameter: (1816–1970) 23.60 mm
- Edge: Milled
- Composition: (1503–1816) Silver; (1816–1920) 92.5% Ag; (1920–1946) 50% Ag; (1947–1970) Cupronickel (Note: 75% Cu and 25% Ni)
- Years of minting: c. 1548 – 1966

Obverse
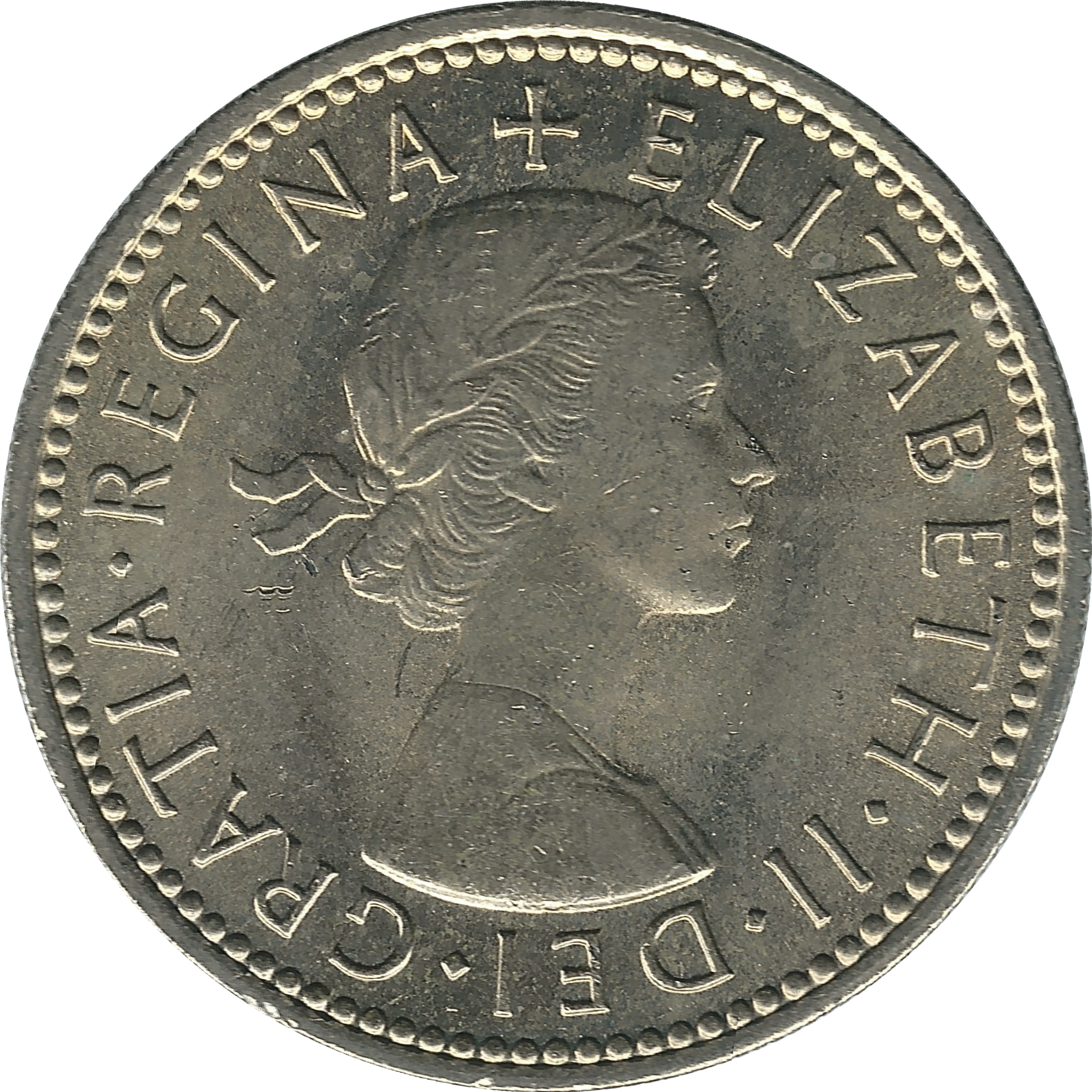
- Design: Profile of the monarch (Elizabeth II design shown)
- Designer: Mary Gillick
- Design date: 1953

Reverse
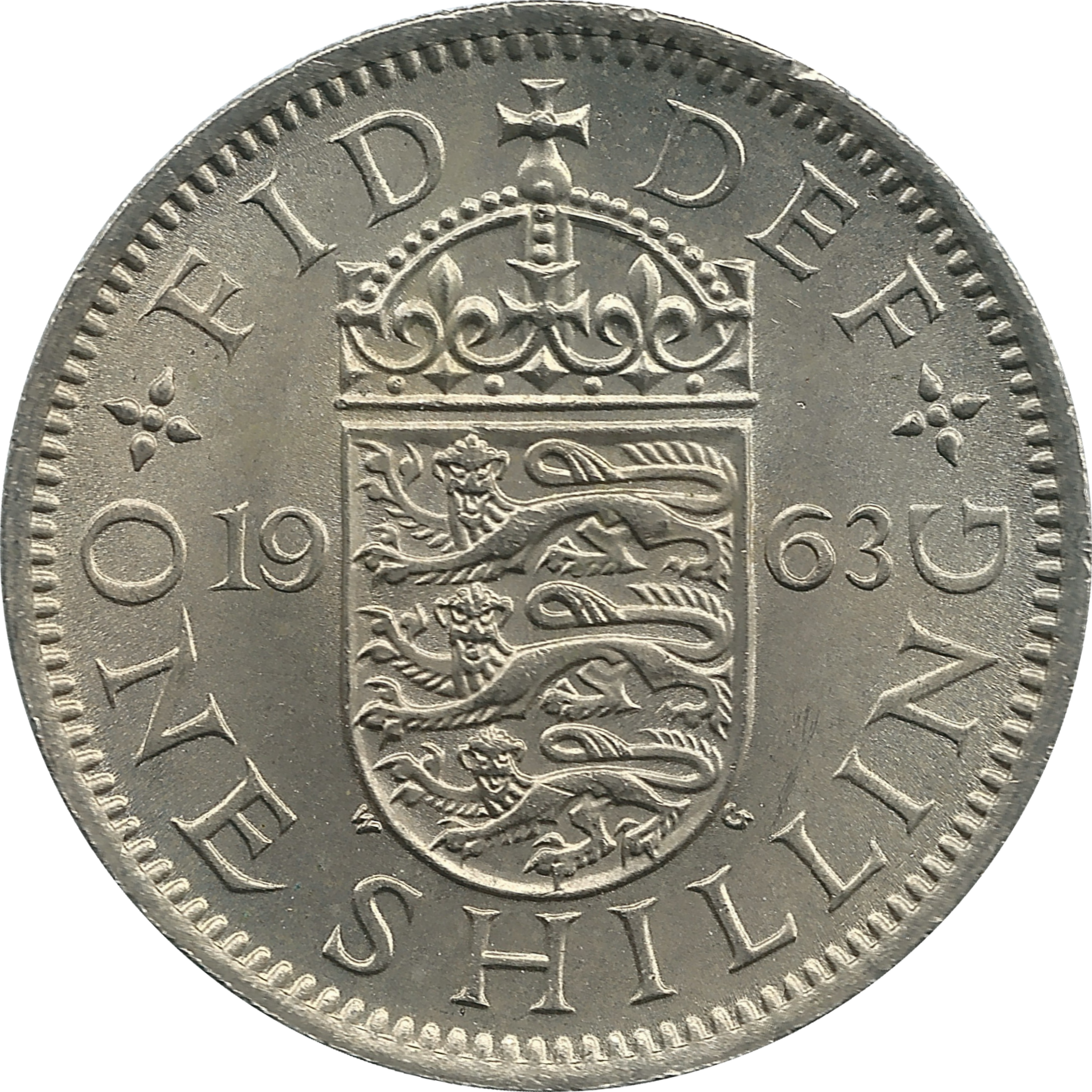
- Design: Various (coat of arms of England design shown)
- Designer: William Gardner
- Design date: 1947

The British shilling, abbreviated "1s" or "1/-", was a unit of currency and a denomination of sterling coinage worth 1/20 of one pound, or twelve pre-decimal pence (equivalent to five new pence, £0.05 in modern decimal notation). It was first minted in England in 1503 or 1504 during the reign of Henry VII as the testoon, and became known as the shilling, from the Old English scilling, sometime in the mid-16th century. It circulated until 1990. It was commonly known as a bob, as in "ten-bob note", also the Scout Association's Bob-a-Job Week.

The shilling was last minted in 1966, prior to the UK's decimalisation. Following Decimal Day on 15 February 1971 the coin had a value of five new pence, and a new coin of the same value but labelled as "five new pence" (the word "new" was removed after 1980) was minted with the same size as the shilling until 1990. The five-pence coin was reduced in size in 1990, and the old larger five-pence coins and the pre-decimal shilling coins were both withdrawn from circulation at the end of the year. It was made from silver from its introduction in or around 1503 until 1946, and thereafter in cupronickel.

Before Decimal Day in 1971, sterling used the Carolingian monetary system ("£sd"), under which the largest unit was a pound (£) divided into 20 shillings (s), each of 12 pence (d).

Although the coin was not minted until the 16th century, the value of a shilling had been used for accounting purposes since the early medieval period. The value of one shilling equalling 12 pence (12 d) was set by the Normans following the conquest; before this various English coins equalling 4, 5, and 12 pence had all been known as shillings.

== History ==
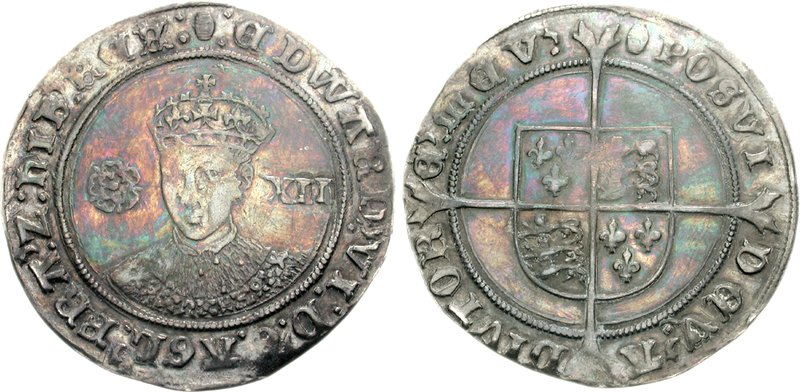
Shilling of Edward VI, struck between 1551 and 1553

The first coins of the pound sterling with the value of 12d were minted in 1503 or 1504 and were known as testoons. The testoon was one of the first English coins to bear a real (rather than a representative) portrait of the monarch on its obverse, and it is for this reason that it obtained its name from an Italian coin known as the testone, or headpiece, which had been introduced in Milan in 1474.

Between 1544 and 1551 the coinage was debased repeatedly by the governments of Henry VIII and Edward VI in an attempt to generate more money to fund foreign wars. This debasement meant that coins produced in 1551 had one-fifth of the silver content of those minted in 1544, and consequently the value of new testoons fell from 12d to 6d. The reason the testoon decreased in value is that unlike today, the value of coins was determined by the market price of the metal contained within them. This debasement was recognised as a mistake, and during Elizabeth I's reign newly minted coins, including the testoon (now known as the shilling), had a much higher silver content and regained their pre-debasement value. Debased testoons were overstruck with portcullis and greyhound symbols to indicate lower values of fourpence-halfpenny and twopence-farthing, before being withdrawn entirely.

Shillings were minted during the reigns of every English monarch after Edward VI, as well as during the Commonwealth, with a vast number of variations and alterations appearing over the years. The Royal Mint undertook a massive recoinage programme in 1816, with large quantities of gold and silver coin being minted. Previous issues of silver coinage had been irregular, and the last issue, minted in 1787, was not intended for issue to the public, but as Christmas gifts to the Bank of England's customers. New silver coinage was to be of .925 (sterling) standard, with silver coins to be minted at 66 shillings to the troy pound. Hence, newly minted shillings weighed 2/11 troy ounce, equivalent to 87.273 grains or 5.655 grams.

The Royal Mint debased the silver coinage in 1920 from 92.5% silver to 50% silver. Shillings of both alloys were minted that year. This debasement was done because of the rising price of silver around the world, and followed the global trend of the elimination, or the reducing in purity, of the silver in coinage. The minting of silver coinage of the pound sterling ceased completely (except for the ceremonial Maundy Money) at the end of 1946 for similar reasons, exacerbated by the costs of the Second World War. New "silver" coinage was instead minted in cupronickel, an alloy of 75% copper and 25% nickel.

Beginning with Lord Wrottesley's proposals in the 1820s there were various attempts to decimalise the pound sterling over the next century and a half. These attempts came to nothing significant until the 1960s when the need for a currency more suited to simple monetary calculations became pressing. The decision to decimalise was announced in 1966, with the pound to be redivided into 100, rather than 240, pence. Decimal Day was set for 15 February 1971, and a whole range of new coins was introduced. Shillings continued to be legal tender with a value of 5 new pence until 31 December 1990.

== Design ==
The Scottish reverse design of a 1966 shilling

Testoons issued during the reign of Henry VII feature a right-facing portrait of the king on the obverse. Surrounding the portrait is the inscription HENRICUS DI GRA REX ANGL Z FRA, or similar, meaning "Henry, by the Grace of God, King of England and France". All shillings minted under subsequent kings and queens bear a similar inscription on the obverse identifying the monarch (or Lord Protector during the Commonwealth), with the portrait usually flipping left-facing to right-facing or vice versa between monarchs. The reverse features the escutcheon of the Royal Arms of England, surrounded by the inscription POSVI DEVM ADIVTORE MEVM, or a variant, meaning "I have made God my helper".

Henry VIII testoons have a different reverse design, featuring a crowned Tudor rose, but those of Edward VI return to the Royal Arms design used previously. Starting with Edward VI the coins feature the denomination XII printed next to the portrait of the king. Elizabeth I and Mary I shillings are exceptions to this; the former has the denomination printed on the reverse, above the coat of arms, and the latter has no denomination printed at all. Some shillings issued during Mary's reign bear the date of minting, printed above the dual portraits of Mary and Philip.

Early shillings of James I feature the alternative reverse inscription EXURGAT DEUS DISSIPENTUR INIMICI, meaning "Let God arise and His enemies be scattered", becoming QVAE DEVS CONIVNXIT NEMO SEPARET, meaning "What God hath put together let no man put asunder" after 1604.

== In popular culture ==
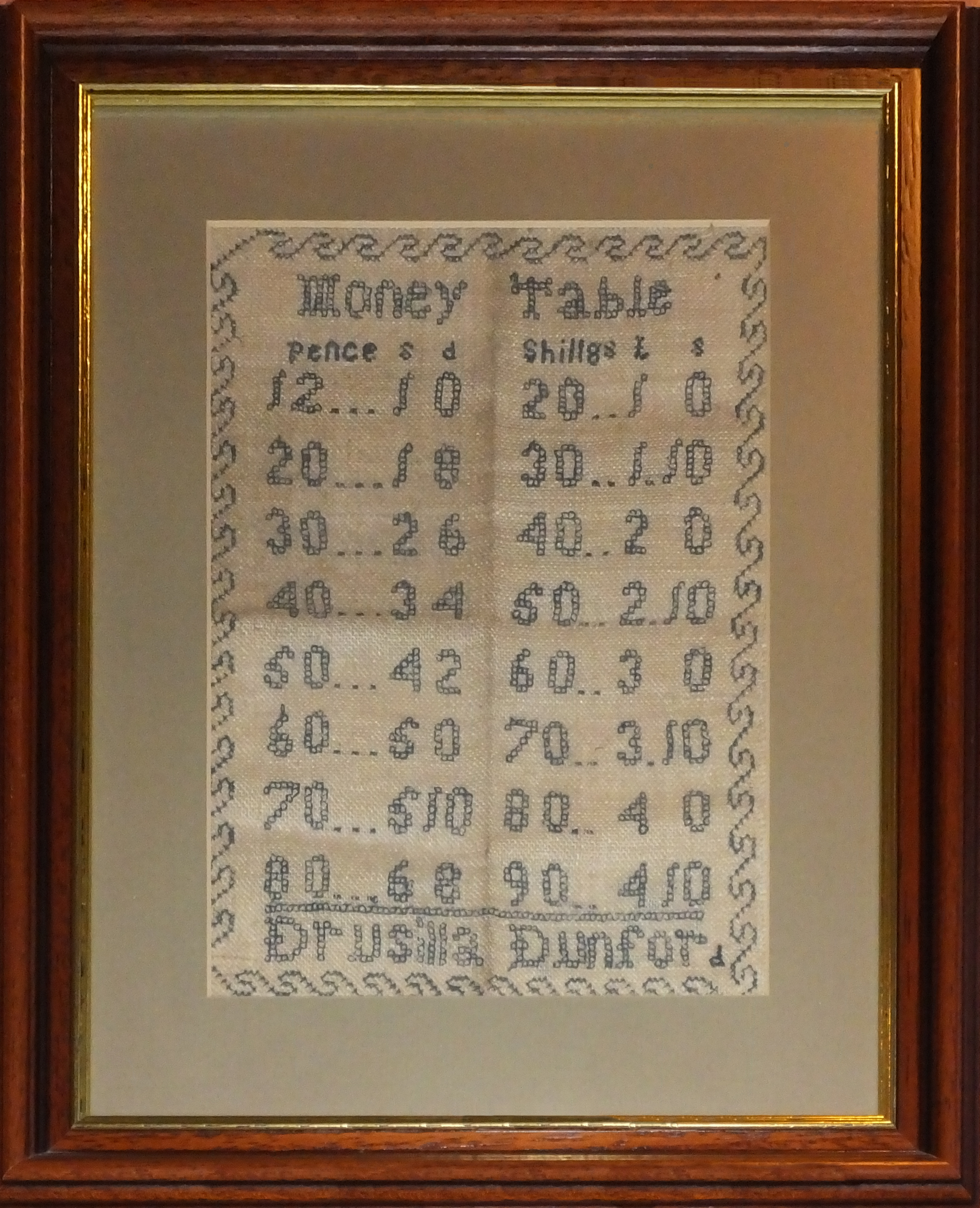
A sampler in the Guildhall Museum of Rochester illustrates the conversion between pence and shillings, going up in units of ten old pennies.

A slang name for shilling was bob (plural as singular, as in "That cost me two bob"). The first recorded use was in a case of coining heard at the Old Bailey in 1789, when it was described as cant, "well understood among a certain set of people", but heard only among criminals and their associates.

In the Gambia, white people are called toubabs, which may derive from the colonial practice of paying locals two shillings for running errands. An alternate etymology holds that the name is derived from French toubib, i.e. doctor.

To "take the King's shilling" was to enlist in the army or navy, a phrase dating back to the early 19th century.

To "cut someone off with a shilling", often quoted as "cut off without a shilling" means to disinherit. Although this has no basis in English law, some believe that leaving a family member a single shilling in one's will ensured that it could not be challenged in court as an oversight.

A popular legend holds that a shilling was the value of a cow in Kent, or a sheep elsewhere.

== Mintages ==
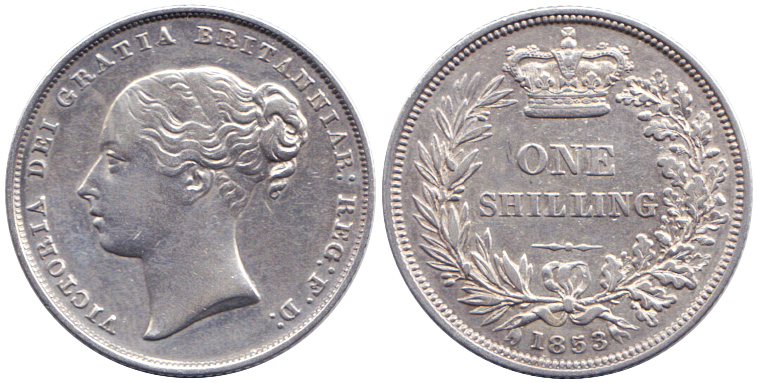
Queen Victoria Shilling, 1838–1887. Engravers William Wyon and Jean Baptiste Merlen.

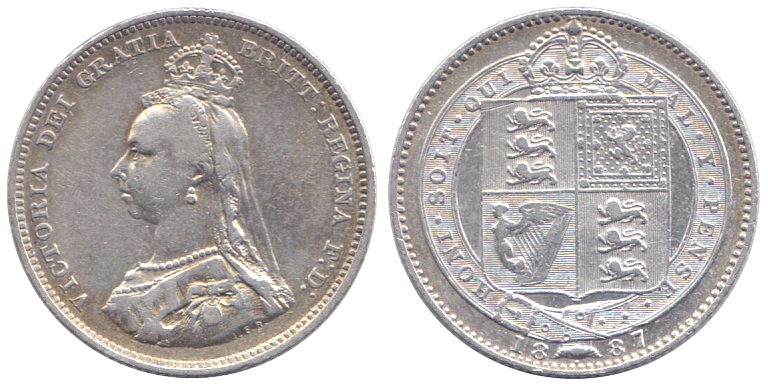
Queen Victoria Shilling, 1887–1889. Engravers Joseph Edgar Boehm and Leonard Charles Wyon.

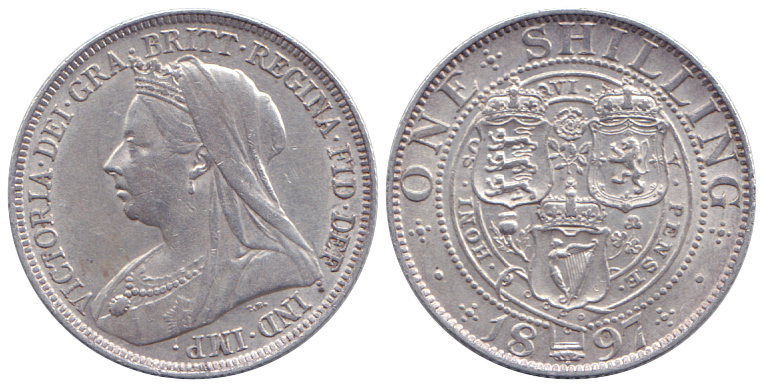
Queen Victoria Shilling, 1893–1901. Engravers Thomas Brock and Edward Poynter.

Victoria

- 1838 – 1,956,240
- 1839 – 5,666,760
- 1840 – 1,639,440
- 1841 – 875,160
- 1842 – 2,094,840
- 1843 – 1,465,200
- 1844 – 4,466,760
- 1845 – 4,082,760
- 1846 – 4,031,280
- 1848 – 1,041,480
- 1849 – 645,480
- 1850 – 685,080
- 1851 – 470,071
- 1852 – 1,306,574
- 1853 – 4,256,188
- 1854 – 522,414
- 1855 – 1,368,499
- 1856 – 3,168,600
- 1857 – 2,562,120
- 1858 – 3,108,600
- 1859 – 4,561,920
- 1860 – 1,671,120
- 1861 – 1,382,040
- 1862 – 954,360
- 1863 – 839,320
- 1864 – 4,518,360
- 1865 – 5,619,240
- 1866 – 4,989,600
- 1867 – 2,166,120
- 1868 – 3,330,360
- 1869 – 736,560
- 1870 – 1,467,471
- 1871 – 4,910,010
- 1872 – 8,897,781
- 1873 – 6,589,598
- 1874 – 5,503,747
- 1875 – 4,353,983
- 1876 – 1,057,387
- 1877 – 2,980,703
- 1878 – 3,127,131
- 1879 – 3,611,407
- 1880 – 4,842,786
- 1881 – 5,255,332
- 1882 – 1,611,786
- 1883 – 7,281,450
- 1884 – 3,923,993
- 1885 – 3,336,527
- 1886 – 2,086,819
- 1887 – 4,034,133
- 1888 – 4,526,856
- 1889 – 7,039,628
- 1890 – 8,794,042
- 1891 – 5,665,348
- 1892 – 4,591,622
- 1893 – 7,040,386
- 1894 – 5,953,152
- 1895 – 8,880,651
- 1896 – 9,264,551
- 1897 – 6,270,364
- 1898 – 9,768,703
- 1899 – 10,965,382
- 1900 – 10,937,590
- 1901 – 3,426,294

Edward VII

- 1902 – 7,905,604
- 1903 – 2,061,823
- 1904 – 2,040,161
- 1905 – 488,390
- 1906 – 10,791,025
- 1907 – 14,083,418
- 1908 – 3,806,969
- 1909 – 5,664,982
- 1910 – 26,547,236

George V

- 1911 – 20,065,908; 6,000 (Proof)
- 1912 – 15,594,009
- 1913 – 9,011,509
- 1914 – 23,415,843
- 1915 – 39,279,024
- 1916 – 35,862,015
- 1917 – 22,202,608
- 1918 – 34,915,934
- 1919 – 10,823,824
- 1920 – 22,865,142
- 1921 – 22,648,763
- 1922 – 27,215,738
- 1923 – 14,575,243
- 1924 – 9,250,095
- 1925 – 5,418,764
- 1926 – 22,516,453
- 1927 – 9,262,244
- 1928 – 18,136,778
- 1929 – 19,343,006
- 1930 – 3,137,092
- 1931 – 6,993,926
- 1932 – 12,168,101
- 1933 – 11,511,624
- 1934 – 6,138,463
- 1935 – 9,183,462
- 1936 – 11,910,613

George VI

English Crest

- 1937 – 8,359,524; 26,000 (Proof)
- 1938 – 4,833,436
- 1939 – 11,052,677
- 1940 – 11,099,126
- 1941 – 11,391,883
- 1942 – 17,453,643
- 1943 – 11,404,213
- 1944 – 11,586,751
- 1945 – 15,143,404
- 1946 – 18,663,797
- 1947 – 12,120,611
- 1948 – 45,576,923
- 1949 – 19,328,405
- 1950 – 19,261,385; 17,500 (Proof)
- 1951 – 9,956,930; 20,000 (Proof)

Scottish Crest

- 1937 – 6,775,877; 26,000 (Proof)
- 1938 – 4,797,852
- 1939 – 10,263,892
- 1940 – 9,913,089
- 1941 – 8,086,830
- 1942 – 13,676,759
- 1943 – 9,824,214
- 1944 – 10,990,167
- 1945 – 15,106,270
- 1946 – 16,381,501
- 1947 – 12,283,223
- 1948 – 45,351,937
- 1949 – 21,243,074
- 1950 – 14,299,614; 18,000 (Proof)
- 1951 – 10,961,174; 20,000 (Proof)

Elizabeth II

English Shield

- 1953 – 41,943,800; 40,000 (Proof)
- 1954 – 30,162,032
- 1955 – 45,259,908
- 1956 – 44,970,009
- 1957 – 42,774,217
- 1958 – 14,392,305
- 1959 – 19,442,778
- 1960 – 27,027,932
- 1961 – 39,816,907
- 1962 – 36,704,374
- 1963 – 44,714,000
- 1964 – 13,617,440
- 1965 – 11,236,000
- 1966 – 15,002,000
- 1970 – 750,476 (Proof only)

Scottish Shield

- 1953 – 20,663,528; 40,000 (Proof)
- 1954 – 26,771,735
- 1955 – 27,950,906
- 1956 – 42,853,639
- 1957 – 17,959,988
- 1958 – 40,822,557
- 1959 – 1,012,988
- 1960 – 14,375,932
- 1961 – 2,762,558
- 1962 – 18,967,310
- 1963 – 32,300,000
- 1964 – 5,246,560
- 1965 – 31,364,000
- 1966 – 15,604,000
- 1970 – 750,476 (Proof only)
