= William Gardner (coin designer) =

English coin designer, engraver, calligrapher and writer

William Maving Gardner (25 May 1914 – 28 December 2000) was an English coin designer, engraver, calligrapher and writer who worked regularly for the Royal Mint over a 30-year period. He is notable for designing coins such as the British 20 Pence Coin and some of the coins of Cyprus, New Zealand, Jordan, Guyana, Dominican Republic, Sri Lanka and the Falkland Islands.

== Education ==
After having studied calligraphy and letter design at the Hampstead Garden Suburb Institute in his teens, Gardner enrolled at The Royal College of Art, simultaneously studying (in his second and third years), at the Central School of Arts and Crafts under George Friend, J. H. Mason, Barry Hart and Martin Travers. In 1939 his studies were finally rewarded with a diploma and The Travelling Scholarship from the Royal College of Art.

== Professional career ==
Gardner was most well known for his designs for the reverses of the 1953 three penny piece, English and Scottish shillings and the decimal 20p reverse of 1982 still in use today. The artist engraved the coins himself.

He also designed the British Privy Council Seal, the HM Greater and Lesser Signets as well as the seals of the British Medical Association and the Royal Society of Arts.

With the outbreak of World War II, Gardner was soon posted to the Army Camouflage Development and Training Centre at Farnham, where he became involved in the training of 7,000 men of all ranks. Before D-Day he was regularly in the air to advise on camouflaging the build-up of forces. In November 1944 together with a colleague, he set up and ran a new camouflage training school at Scottish Command, Edinburgh.

For the next few years after demobilisation, he spent much of his time as a visiting lecturer in lettering, heraldic design and penmanship at Cambridgeshire College of Arts and Technology, The Central School of Arts and Crafts, London, and Hampstead Garden Suburb Institute (the latter until 1973).

During this period Rolls of Honour commissioned by King George VI for the Household Cavalry were inscribed. A considerable variety of commissions in coin design, heraldry and lettering were completed and in 1955 he became a fellow of the RSA, subsequently serving on the jury of its Industrial Design Bursary scheme.

He also reviewed books over a long period for the RSA Journal. He was an examiner for The City and Guilds of London Institute in craft subjects and the definitive Jersey stamp was designed in 1958 and the Tercentenary stained glass window for the Royal Society in 1960.

In 1963 Gardner was visiting professor and fine art program lecturer at Colorado State University and in the years immediately following he travelled widely to research art and crafts of the United States, Polynesia, New Zealand, Australia and Nepal.

A calligraphic volume for Eton College was completed in 1990.

William Gardner was a Fellow of the Society of Scribes and Illuminators and a Fellow of the Society of Numismatic Artists and Designers.

== Bibliography ==
- Alphabet at Work, 1982, ISBN 978-0-312-02139-9
- William Gardner's Book of Calligraphy, 1988, ISBN 0-7045-3101-1
