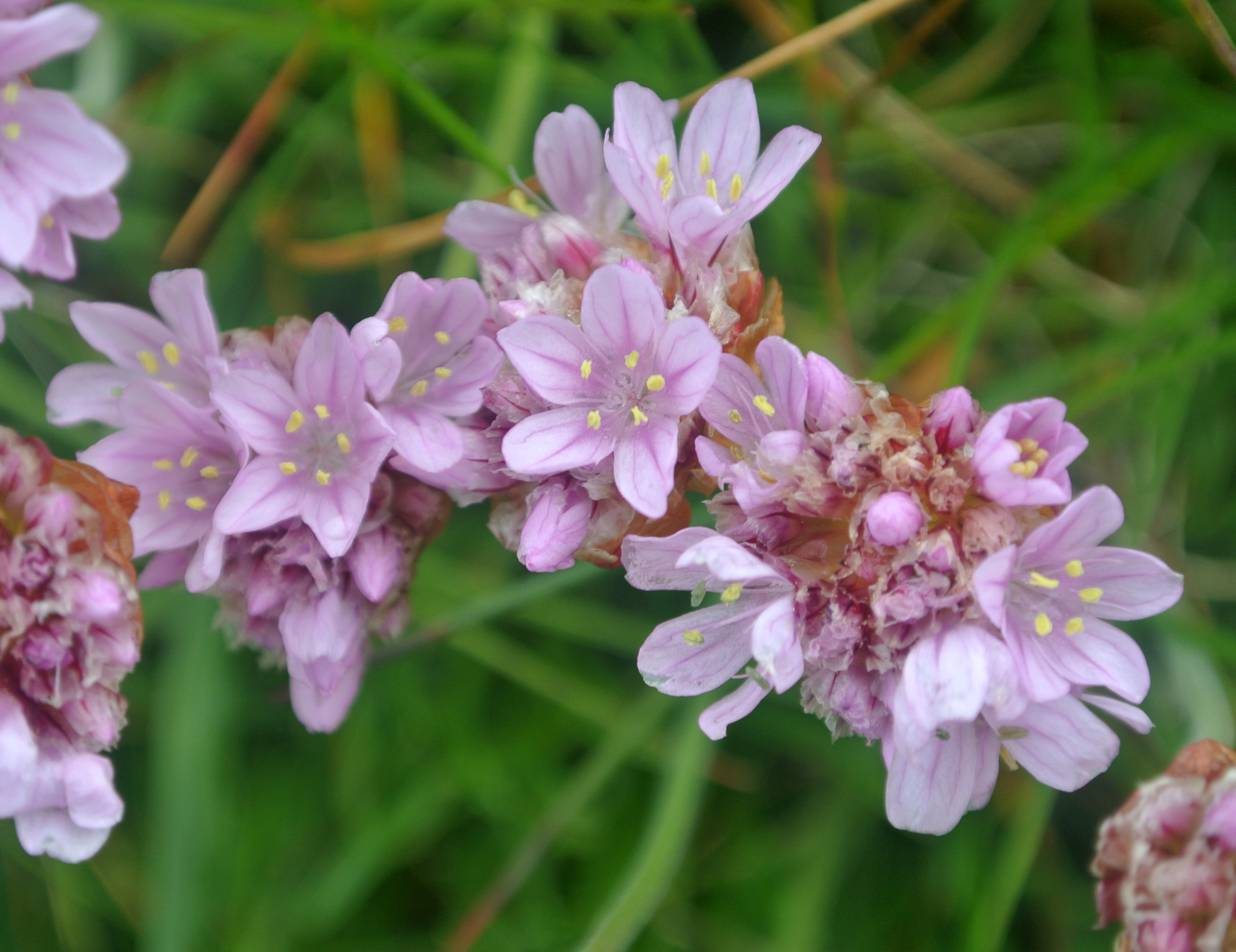
- Armeria maritima at Dunnet Head, Scotland

Scientific classification
- Kingdom: Plantae
- Clade: Embryophytes
- Clade: Tracheophytes
- Clade: Angiosperms
- Clade: Eudicots
- Order: Caryophyllales
- Family: Plumbaginaceae
- Genus: Armeria
- Species: A. maritima

Binomial name
- Armeria maritima (Mill.) Willd.

Synonyms
- Armeria elongata maritima (Mill.) C.Hartm.; Armeria elongata var. maritima (Mill.) Skottsb.; Armeria vulgaris subsp. maritima (Mill.) F.Petri; Armeria vulgaris var. maritima (Mill.) Hartm.; Statice armeria subsp. maritima (Mill.) P.Fourn.; Statice armeria var. maritima (Mill.) Wahlenb.; Statice maritima Mill.

= Armeria maritima =

Species of flowering plant

Armeria maritima, the thrift, sea thrift or sea pink, is a species of flowering plant in the family Plumbaginaceae. It is a compact evergreen perennial which grows in low clumps and sends up long stems that support globes of bright pink flowers. In some cases purple, white or red flowers also occur. It is a popular garden flower and has been distributed worldwide as a garden and cut flower. It does well in gardens designed as xeriscapes or rock gardens. The Latin specific epithet maritima means pertaining to the sea or coastal.

== Subspecies ==
12 subspecies are accepted.

- Armeria maritima subsp. azorica Franco – Azores
- Armeria maritima subsp. barcensis (Simonk.) P.Silva – central Romania (near Brasov)
- Armeria maritima subsp. bottendorfensis (A.G.Schulz) Rothm. – central Germany (Bottendorfer Hügel)
- Armeria maritima subsp. californica – California Seapink – west coast of North America from Vancouver Island to California
- Armeria maritima subsp. elongata (Hoffm.) Bonnier – Tall Thrift – northern, central, and eastern Europe
- Armeria maritima subsp. halleri (Wallr.) Rothm. – coastal Europe from Spain to Poland
- Armeria maritima subsp. hornburgensis (A.G.Schulz) Rothm. – central Germany (Hornburg)
- Armeria maritima subsp. interior (Raup) A.E.Porsild – Saskatchewan (southern Lake Athabasca)
- Armeria maritima subsp. intermedia (T.Marsson) C.Lefèbvre ex Buttler – Denmark and northern Germany
- Armeria maritima subsp. maritima – northern and western Europe and Greenland
- Armeria maritima subsp. purpurea (W.D.J.Koch) Á.Löve and D.Löve (synonym Armeria purpurea W.D.J.Koch) – southern Germany, Switzerland, and northern Italy
- Armeria maritima subsp. sibirica (Turczaninow ex Boissier) Nyman – Siberian Sea Thrift, Foxflower – subarctic Eurasia and North America, Colorado (Hoosier Ridge)
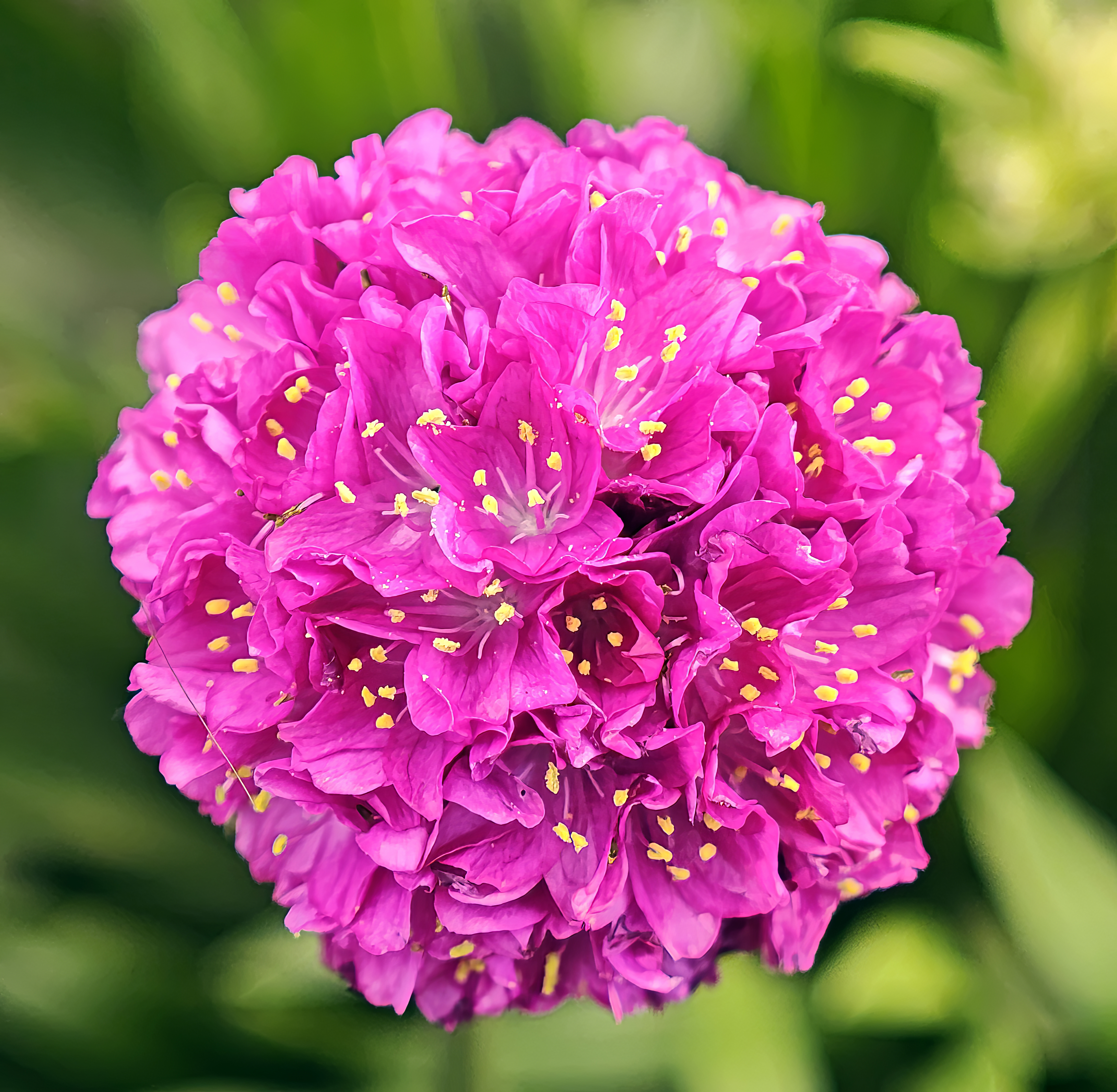
Armeria maritima var. splendens Hort.

== Distribution and habitat ==
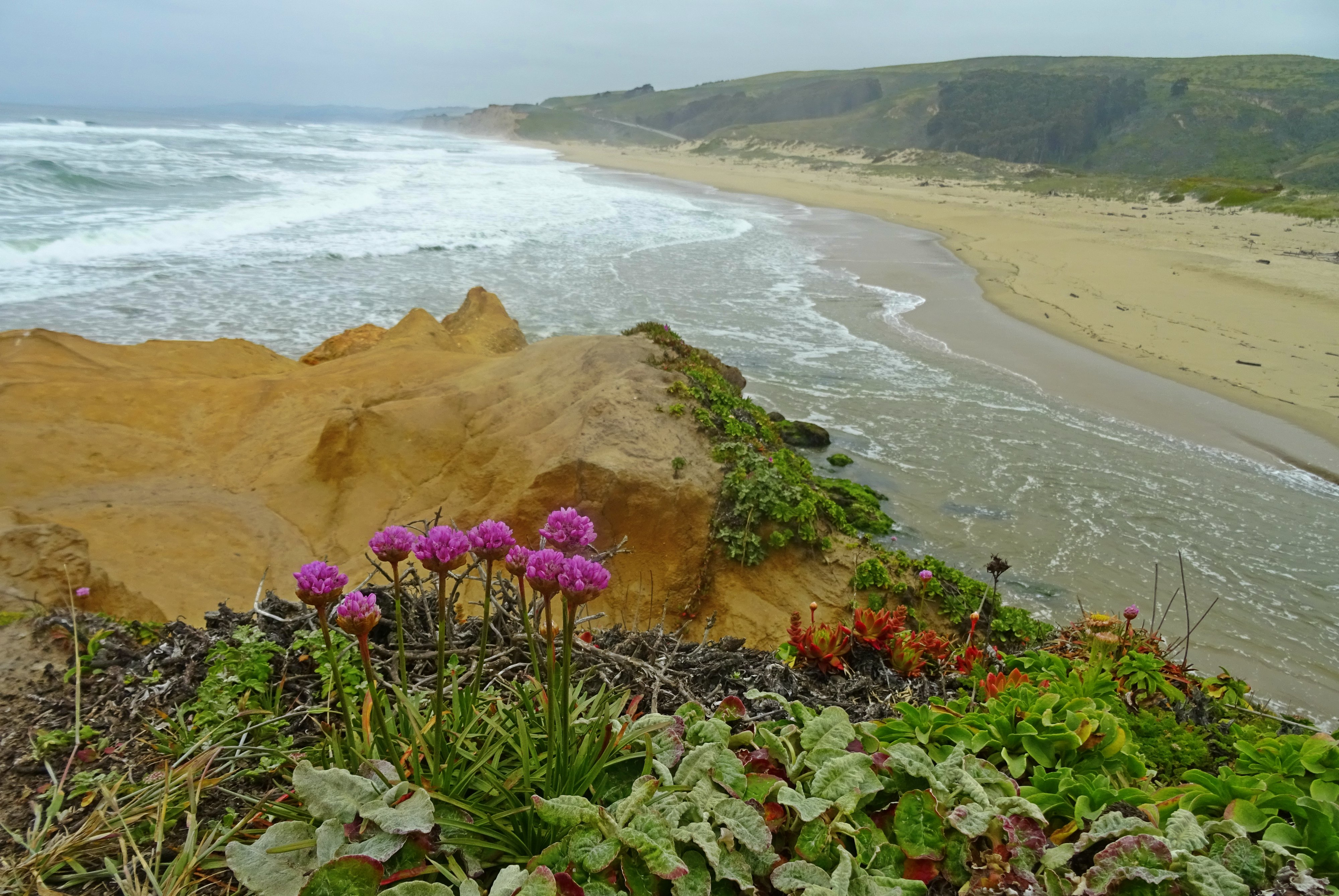
Armeria maritima californica at Pescadero State Beach in California

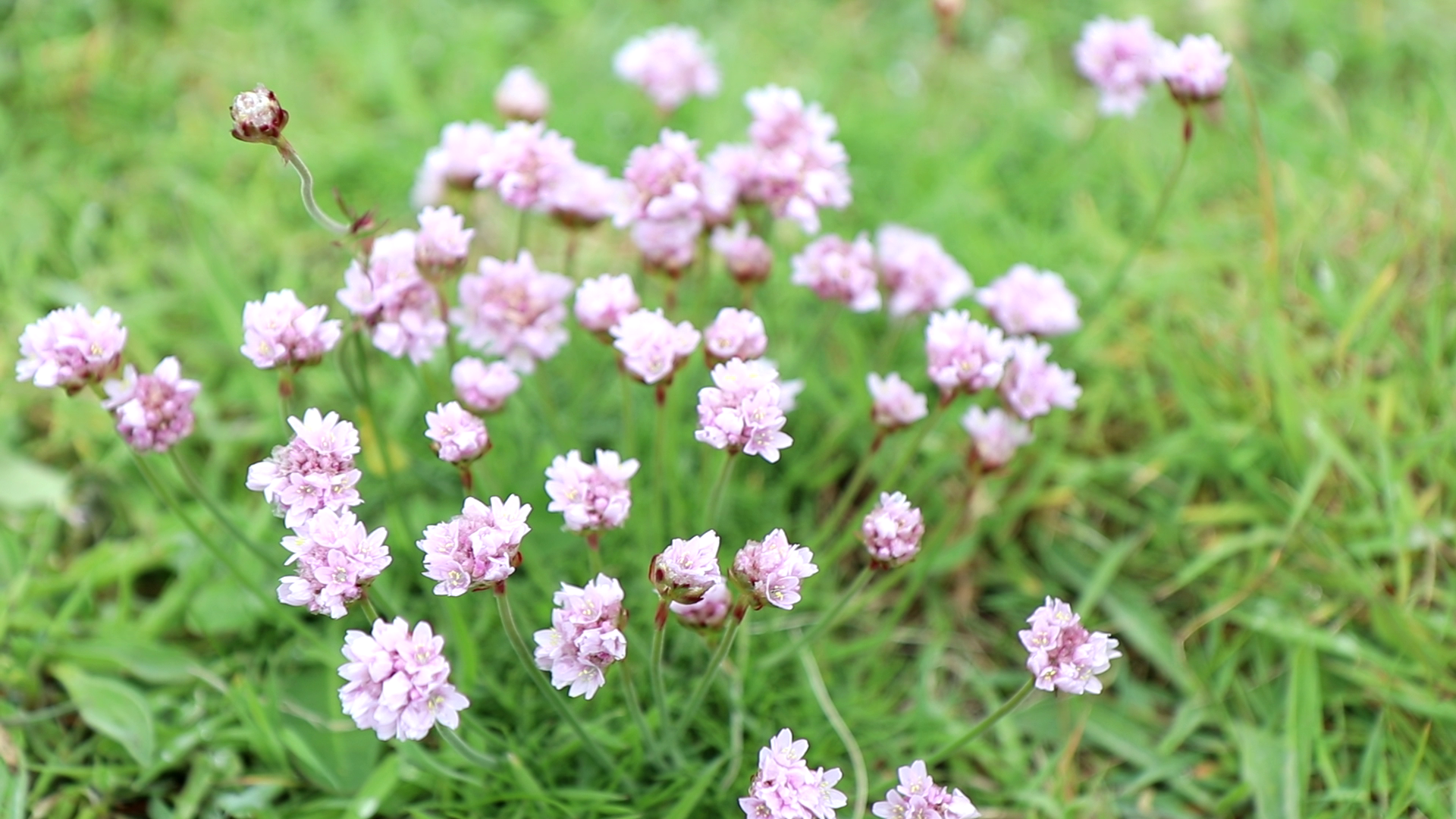
Sea Pinks in Cornwall

Armeria maritima sensu lato has a circumpolar distribution and can be found in the wild in coastal areas across the Northern Hemisphere. It can grow in dry, sandy, saline conditions such as coastal cliffs, grassland and salt marshes, salted roadsides and inland on mountain rocks. It is common in British salt marshes, where it flowers April to October.

Armeria maritima has a great copper-tolerance, and is able to grow in soils with copper concentrations of up to 6400 mg/kg. One mechanism proposed is that not much copper is transported up the shoot of the plant, and is excreted from decaying leaves. Some of the physiology and metabolism of this species has been described, of particular note is how the metabolism of this species is altered with elevated atmospheric carbon dioxide concentrations.

== Ecology ==
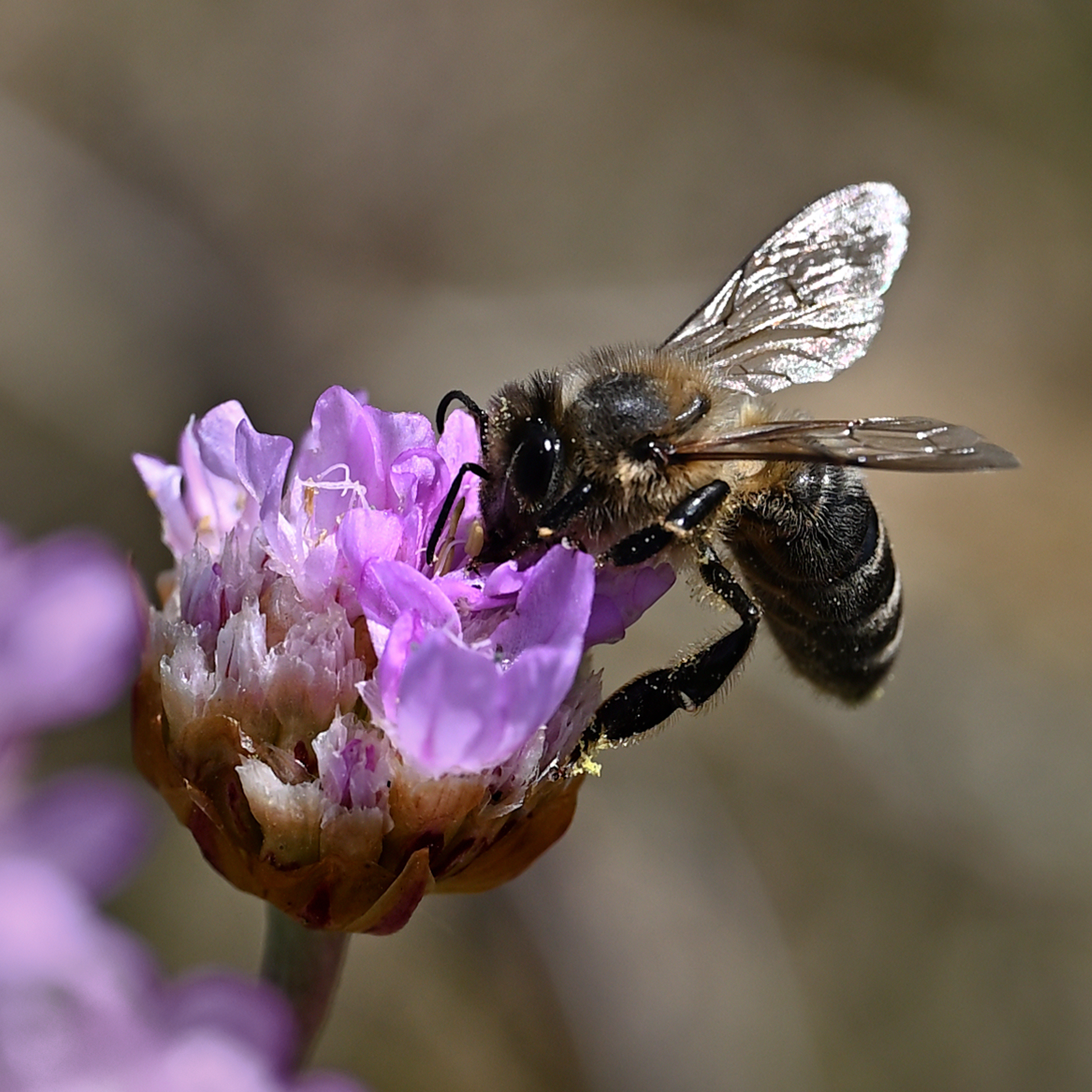
Armeria maritima with bee (Hiddensee Island)

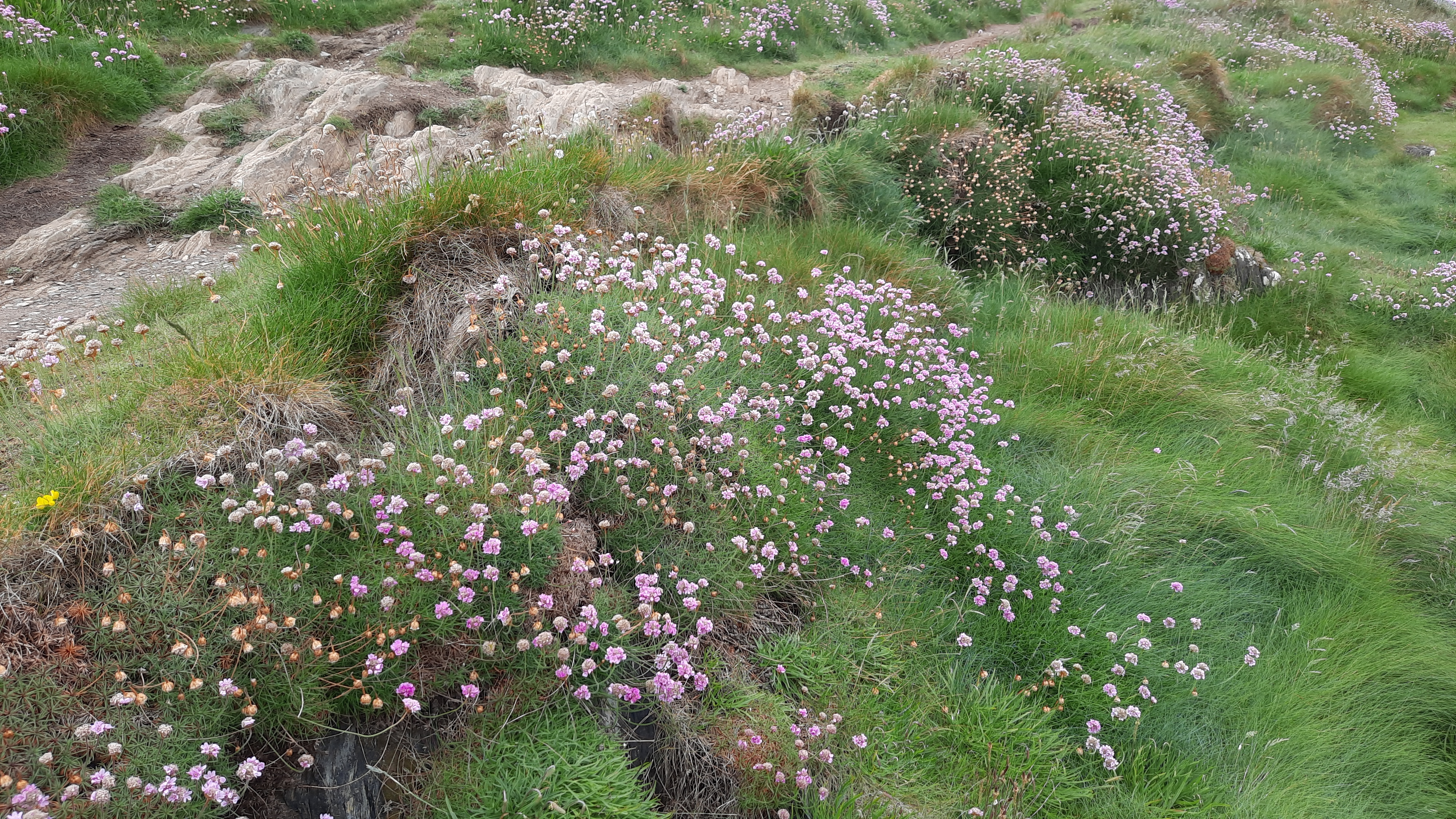
Sea thrift on the Pembrokeshire coast path

Pollination is by various insects including bees and Lepidoptera.

It is a known host species to the pathogenic fungus Phoma herbarum.

== Conservation ==
Armeria maritima is a common species in the UK, however there are several subspecies and in England, subspecies elongata (Tall Thrift) has vulnerable conservation status and is designated as a species of principal importance for biodiversity conservation under the NERC Act (2006).

== Cultivation ==
The cultivar 'Vindictive' has gained the Royal Horticultural Society's Award of Garden Merit.

== In popular culture ==
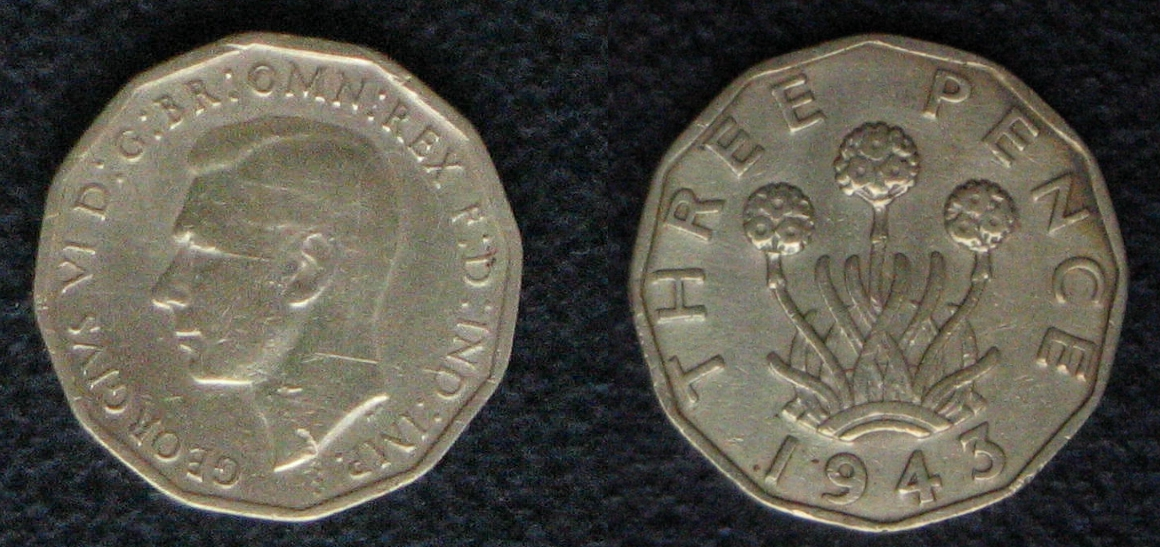
A 1943 threepence (British coin)

The British threepence coin issued between 1937 and 1952 had a design of thrift on the reverse. The word thrift also means the practice of frugality, being careful with money and so avoiding waste. So, in light of the economic depression of the 1930s and the privations of the Second World War the choice of the thrift plant for the design of the new 12-sided nickel-brass threepenny bit (3d coin) which was replacing the silver three old pence coin (with origins going back to the mid-sixteenth century) was apt. With the accession of Queen Elizabeth II in 1952, the thrift plant with its three flower heads was replaced on threepenny bit with a crowned portcullis, recalling a royal badge used by Queen Elizabeth I and her predecessors from the House of Tudor.

As part of a 2002 marketing campaign, the plant conservation charity Plantlife chose sea thrift as the county flower of the Isles of Scilly.
