= Spink & Son =

Auction house, commercial art gallery, numismatics

Spink and Son Ltd
- Type: Private
- Industry: Auction
- Founded: 1666; 360 years ago
- Founder: John Spink
- Headquarters: London, United Kingdom
- Key people: Olivier Stocker (Chairman & CEO)
- Divisions: Spink China; Spink Singapore; Spink Switzerland; Spink UK; Spink USA
- Website: www.spink.com

Spink & Son (established 1666) is an auction and collectibles company known principally for their sales of coins, banknotes and medals. They also deal in philatelic items, wine and spirits, and other collectible items.

== History ==
John Spink founded a goldsmith's and pawnbroker's business near Lombard Street, London, in 1666. The Great Fire of London caused a temporary relocation before Spink returned to the rebuilt Lombard Street.

In January 1778, Marshall Spink was apprenticed to John Flude at 2 Gracechurch Street where they brokered pledges of jewellery, coins and other household furnishings.

In April 1785, Flude presented the Dartmouth Medal to Dartmouth College, New Hampshire "as a memento of his attachment to the United States of America and expressive of its future glory". At least three craftsman are determined to have worked on the medal, probably including his apprentice Marshall Spink.

In 1793, Flude retired and left Marshall in charge of the premises at Gracechurch Street, and a second pawnbroking business in Windsor. In 1807, his son Daniel was apprenticed to the family firm, and Spink & Son was instituted. After 1800, other premises were opened in Barbican and at Great Surrey Street but all were closed by 1812. 2 Gracechurch Street became the principal address for the firm for the remainder of the 19th Century.

Spink & Son are recorded as numismatic auction agents and commission bidders as early as 1818. They were retailers of commemorative medals by March 1826.

By the 1830s, Spink was dealing in art, porcelain and bronze sculptures. Spink would be commissioned to produce a presentation wooden casket to contain the Freedom of the City of London for Dr David Livingstone in 1857.

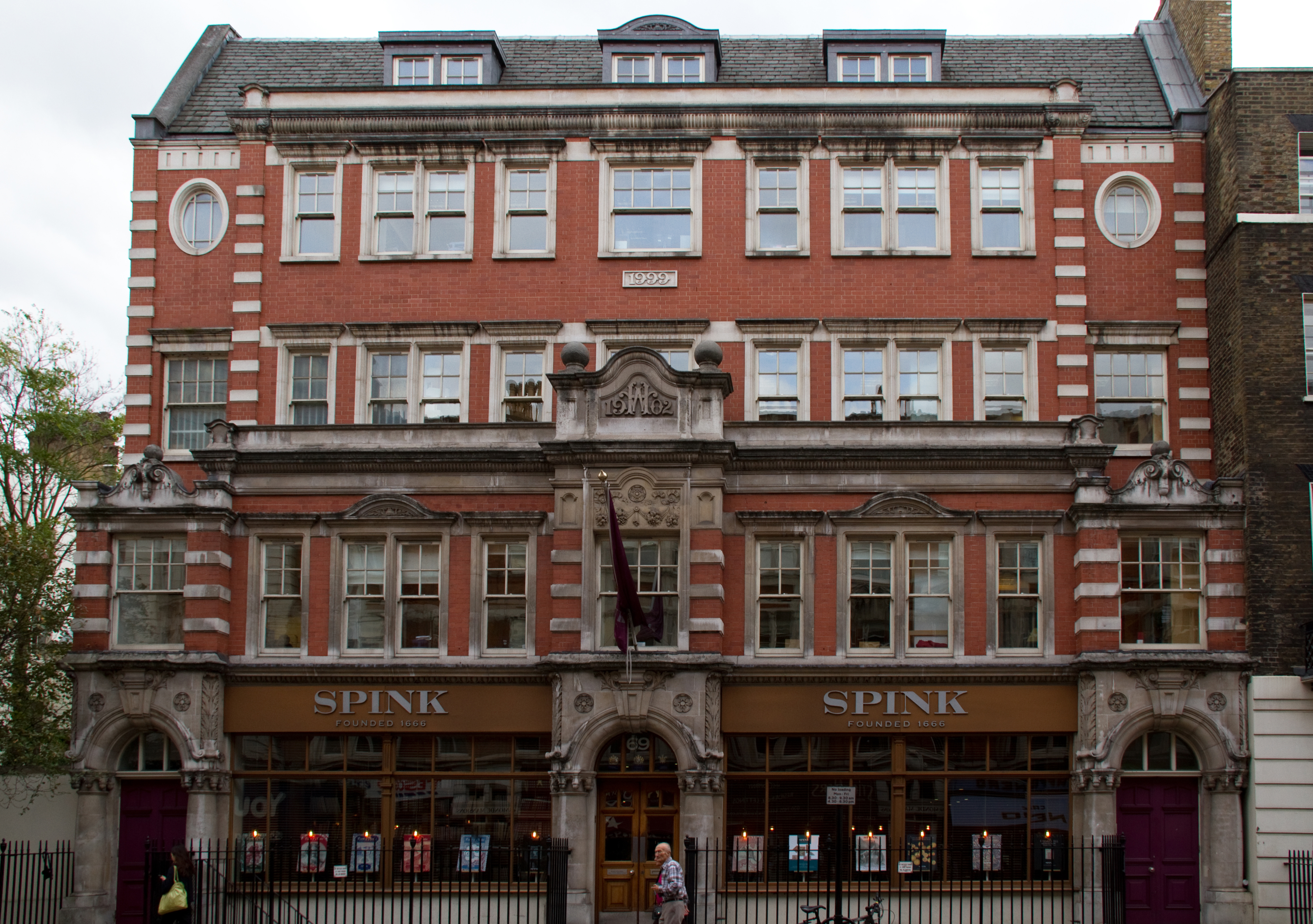
Spink offices in Southampton Row

Spink won the Gold Prize for Numismatic and Medal display at the Jamaica International Exhibition in 1891, and offered its showroom to Sir Malcolm Fraser for the display of 6,886 ounces of recently mined gold ore from Bayley's Reward Claim, Coolgardie, on behalf of the Government of Western Australia. The exhibition ran between 2 and 14 April 1894.

The 20th Century saw the firm's relocation to King Street and close partnership with Christie's auction house, who would eventually acquire the firm in 1993. Global expansion continued with new offices opening in New York in June 1981 and Melbourne, Australia in October 1981.

On 20 March 2000, Spink & Son moved its London headquarters to 69 Southampton Row where it continues operations today. Christie's sold its remaining interest to the present ownership in March 2002.

== Medalists ==
In 1880, Spink bought the Soho Mint and began to design and manufacture medals. They gained their first Royal Warrant from Queen Victoria in 1900 for medal services and currently hold one from King Charles III for ceremonial insignia and medals. The company produces orders and medals for various countries including the United Kingdom, Norway, and Oman.

== Publishing ==
In 1996, Spink took over the entire publishing division of B.A. Seaby Ltd., publishers of the Seaby Coin & Medal Bulletin.

Spink is well known for its annual Standard Catalogue of British Coins price guide and handbook, also part of the Seaby acquisition and founded in 1929. Already in 1962 it had been split in two parts, I. England and United Kingdom and II. Coins of Scotland, Ireland and the Islands, in annual editions and with black and white photos of the coins, and in 2007 it was converted to colour printing with newly-taken coin photographs. Later on, Volume I. was split further into Coins of England & the United Kingdom, Pre-Decimal Issues (2024: 59th edition), and Coins of England & the United Kingdom, Decimal Issues, both edited by Emma Howard.

In April 2024, the Spink's "Coins of England & the United Kingdom, Pre-Decimal Issues", "Coins of England & the United Kingdom, Decimal Issues" and "Coins of Scotland, Ireland and the Islands, including Anglo-Gallic Coins", were acquired by Sovereign Rarities Ltd. The acquisition by Sovereign Rarities Ltd will see the next edition for 2025 produced under their branding for the first time.

== Auctions ==
The first recorded auction held by the company was undertaken by Marshall Spink at the Red Lion Inn in Staines, Middlesex on 20 March 1792.

The principal business remained pawnbroking and sales were soon outsourced to other companies in the first half of the 19th Century.

Soon after William John Webster, Inspector to the Royal Mint and Leonard Forrer joined the firm, Spink created a fixed price periodical for the sale of collectable coins. The Numismatic Circular was issued monthly from December 1892 until January 2014, when it was discontinued in favour of a quarterly auction format for selling coins. It was "the oldest continually published coin and medal catalogue".

Webster provided cataloguing expertise to Sotheby's and Glendining auctions in the 20th Century before auctioneering returned in house in 1978. Spink holds numerous auction records across numismatics, philately and phaleristics including:

=== Coins ===
- Nectanebo II Gold Stater sold for £206,000 on 3 April 2023.
- Julius Caesar and Octavian Gold Aureus sold for £264,000 on 3 April 2023.
- Esunertos Gold Quarter Stater sold for £20,400 on 28 September 2023
- Coenwulf Gold Mancus sold for £230,000 on 6 October 2004.
- Henry III Gold Penny sold for £648,000 on 23 January 2022.
- Edward III Gold Double Leopard sold for £460,000 on 29 June 2006.
- Elizabeth I 'Distress Relieved' Gold Medallet by Nicholas Hilliard sold for £480,000 on 28 September 2021.
- Charles II 'Petition' Crown, 1663 sold for £207,100 on 27 September 2007.
- Charles II 'Reddite' Crown, 1663 sold for £396,000 on 26 March 2014.
- The Ellerby Area Hoard of 264 English gold coins sold for £754,200 on 7 October 2022
- George III Pattern Five Pounds, 1820 sold for £360,000 on 14 May 2015.
- William IV Pattern Five Pounds, 1831 sold for £444,000 on 14 December 2023.
- United States of America, Proof Set, 1888 sold for $672,000 on 24 September 2022
- Edward VIII Pattern Penny, 1937 sold for £133,000 on 24 September 2019.

=== Medals ===
- Squadron Leader Arthur 'Pongo' Scarf VC, group of five medals, sold for £660,000 on 27 April 2022.
- Flight Lieutenant William Reid VC, group of six medals, sold for £348,000 on 19 November 2009.
- Sir Thomas Ussher KCH, five-clasp naval general service medal sold for £138,000 on 25 July 2013.
- Wing Commander R F T 'Bob' Doe DSO, DFC*, group of nine medals, sold for £222,000 on 25 November 2010.
- Wing Commander John 'Cats Eyes' Cunningham CBE, DSO**, DFC*, AE, group of seven medals, sold for £384,000 on 6 September 2012.
- Captain William Howard Livens DSO MC group of five medals, sold for £14,400 on 24 July 2018.
- Rupert Chawner Brooke memorial death plaque, sold for £25,200 on 25 November 2023.
- Flt Lt Edward "Johnnie" Johnson DFC group of five medals, sold for £126,000 on 25 November 2023.

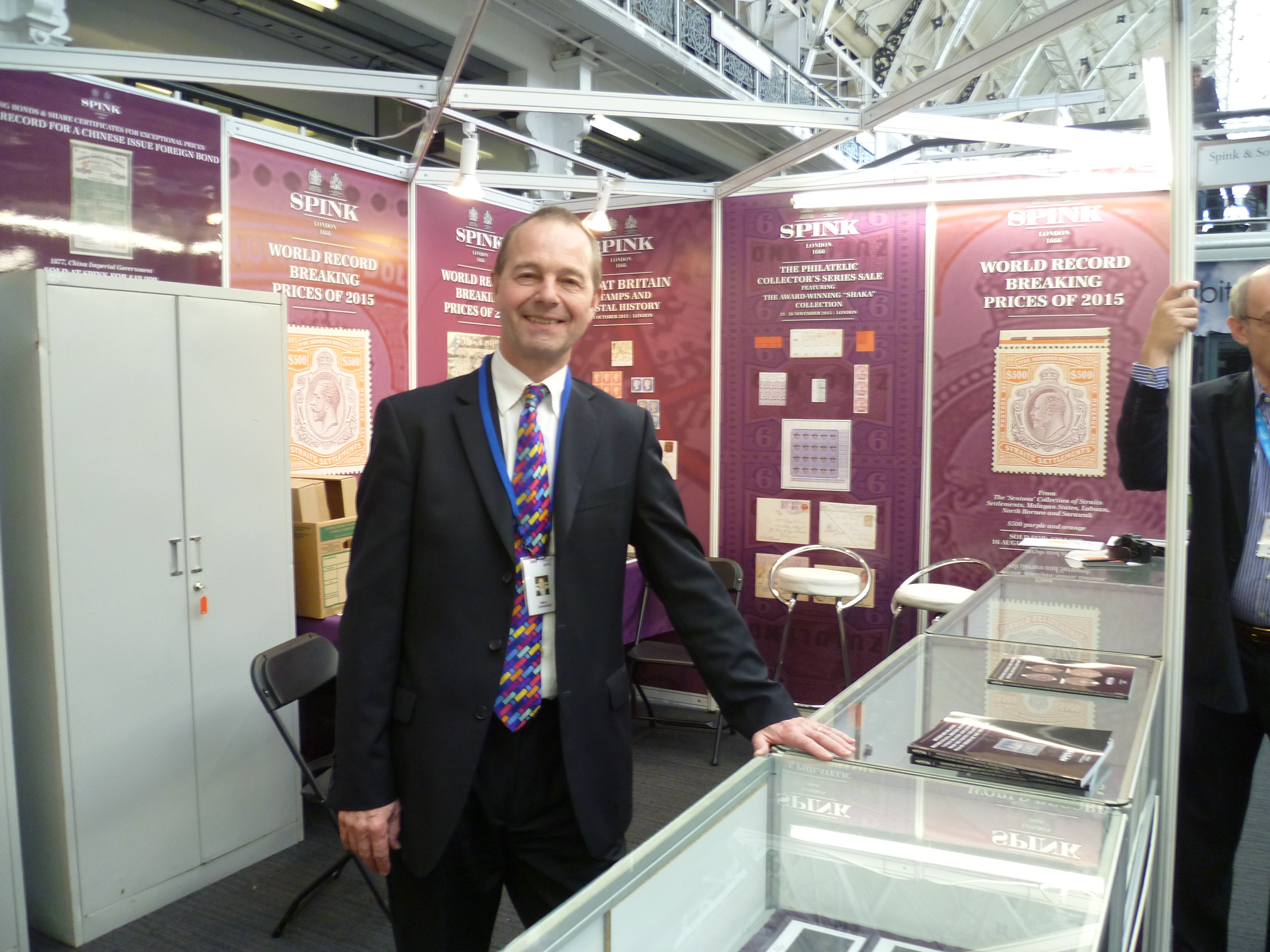
Spink staff at autumn Stampex 2015

=== Stamps ===
- "Post Office Mauritius" Two Pence Blue, sold for £1,053,090 on 29 June 2011.
- "Inverted Jenny" 24¢ Curtiss Airmail Centreline block of four, sold for $1,740,000 on 27 September 2019.
- Queen Victoria 96c "olive-bistre" block-of-four, sold for HK$6.4million on 17 January 2016.
- The "Chartwell" Collection formed by Sir Humphrey Cripps, and dubbed the "most valuable stamp collection offered in modern times", sold between June 2011 and December 2012 for over £18.5million

=== Banknotes ===
- China "Ooi-Long" 1 Yuan sold for HK$990,000 on 24 January 2010.
- Palestine Currency Board 100 Pounds, 1927 sold for £140,000 on 28 April 2022.
- Zanzibar 500 Rupees, 1920 sold for $288,000 on 14 January 2022.

Since January 2003, Spink has partnered with the Bank of England to offer low serial number banknotes and raise money for charity when new designs are issued. In November 2022, it was announced that the NatWest Group were offering their own paper money archives to raise funds for the Trussell Trust.

== Covid-19 ==
Following Prime Minister Boris Johnson's announcement of lockdown measures in the United Kingdom on 23 March 2020, Spink was the first numismatic auctioneer in the world to pioneer a successful 'hybrid' sale where every bidder participated virtually.

In July 2020, it was announced that Spink had remounted the campaign medals of Captain Sir Thomas Moore.

In 2022, the Antiques Trade Gazette announced that Spink was the leading auction firm in London for coins and medals.

== Khmer antiquities probe ==
In 2021, prosecutors and investigative journalists probed Spink & Son's historic relationship with antiquities trafficker Douglas Latchford, in relation to his false documentation of Khmer antiquities, sometimes together with Emma Bunker. Latchford was indicted, but Spink & Son as a separate entity under new management was not charged.

== Staff ==
Over several centuries, many notable numismatists and auction specialists have worked at Spink, including:

- William John Webster (1848–1919), Inspector of Coin for the Royal Mint, who joined the firm on 24 July 1893 until his death.
- Leonard Forrer (1869–1953), who created the Numismatic Circular, and edited it until his retirement in 1952.
- Leonard Steyning Forrer (1895–1968), son of Leonard and author of The Art of Collecting Coins (1955), who became an independent dealer in 1945.
- Rudolph Forrer (1896-1974), son of Leonard, specialising in numismatics and Egyptian, Greek and Roman antiquities. General Manager of Spinks for some years, retiring around 1960.
- William Charles Weight (1859–1923), who left the firm to become an independent dealer in 1908.
- Herbert Allen Seaby (1898–1979), who left the firm in 1926 to found rival Seaby's.
- Howard Linecar (1912–1985), author of numismatic publications who worked at the firm between 1935 and 1978.
- Douglas Gerard Liddell (1919–2003), who joined the firm in 1946 and worked until his retirement in 1987.
- Patrick Finn (1942–2000), who was Director of Numismatics until Spink was acquired by Christie's in 1993.
- Anthony Spink (1939–2019), Chairman, and last member of the original Spink family to work at the firm.
