= Crown (English coin) =

English coin introduced in 1526

Henry VIII
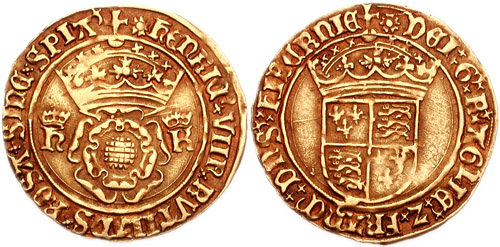
First side of the image: HENRIC VIII RVTILANS ROSA SINE SPIA', crowned double rose flanked by crowned H and K (Henry and Katherine of Aragon); saltire stops
Second side of the image: DEI G' R' AGLIE' Z FRANC' DNS' hIBERNIE, crowned royal coat-of-arms; double saltire stops.
AV Crown of the Double Rose (26mm, 3.69 g, 8h). Second coinage, struck 1526–1529. London mint; mm: rose.

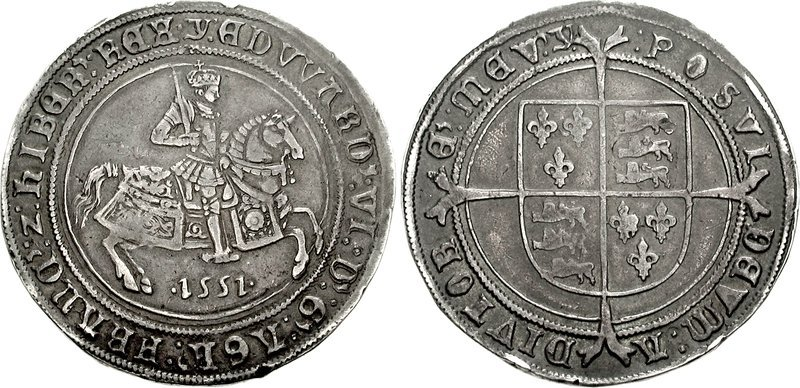
The first English silver crown, that of Edward VI (fine silver, 41mm, 30.78 g, 9h; third period)

The crown, originally known as the "crown of the double rose", was an English coin introduced as part of King Henry VIII's monetary reform of 1526, with a value of 1/4 of one pound, or five shillings, or 60 pre-decimal pence.

It was superseded by the British crown in 1707, the decimal 25p (quarter-pound) crown in 1971, and £5 commemorative crowns after 1990.

== History ==
The first such coins were minted in 22 carat "crown gold", and the first silver crowns were produced in 1551 during the brief reign of King Edward VI. However, some crowns continued to be minted in gold until 1662. No crowns were minted in the reign of Mary I, but silver as well as gold crowns again appeared in the reign of her successor Elizabeth I. Until the time of the Commonwealth of England it was usual for some crowns to be minted in gold as well as in silver, so both versions of the coin can be found for James I and Charles I.

The silver crown was one of a number of European silver coins which first appeared in the 16th century, all of which were of a similar diameter (about 38 mm (1.5 in)) and weight (approximately one troy ounce, 31.1 grams), so were more or less interchangeable in international trade. English silver crowns were minted in all reigns from that of Elizabeth I. The Charles II Petition Crown, engraved by Thomas Simon, is exceptionally rare.

The composition of the silver crowns was the sterling silver standard of 92.5 per cent silver and 7.5 per cent copper, established in the 12th century by Henry II. This was harder-wearing than fine silver, yet still a high grade. The hardness discouraged the practice of "clipping", and this practice was further discouraged (and largely eliminated) with the introduction of the milled edge.

With the creation of the Kingdom of Great Britain in 1707, the English crown was superseded by the British crown, which is still minted, although since 1990 with a face value of five pounds.

== Gallery ==
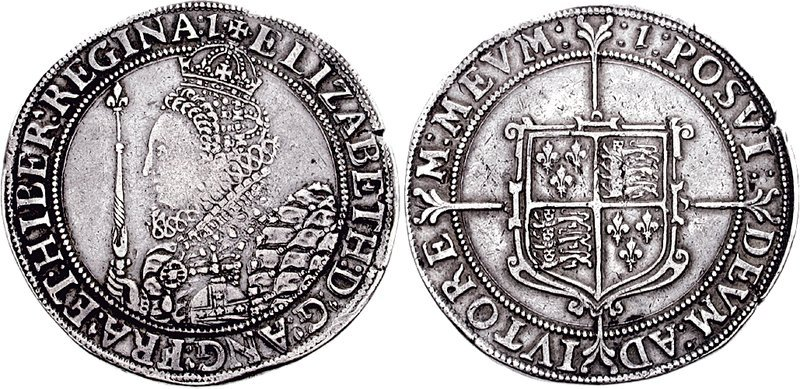
Crown of Elizabeth I (1602)

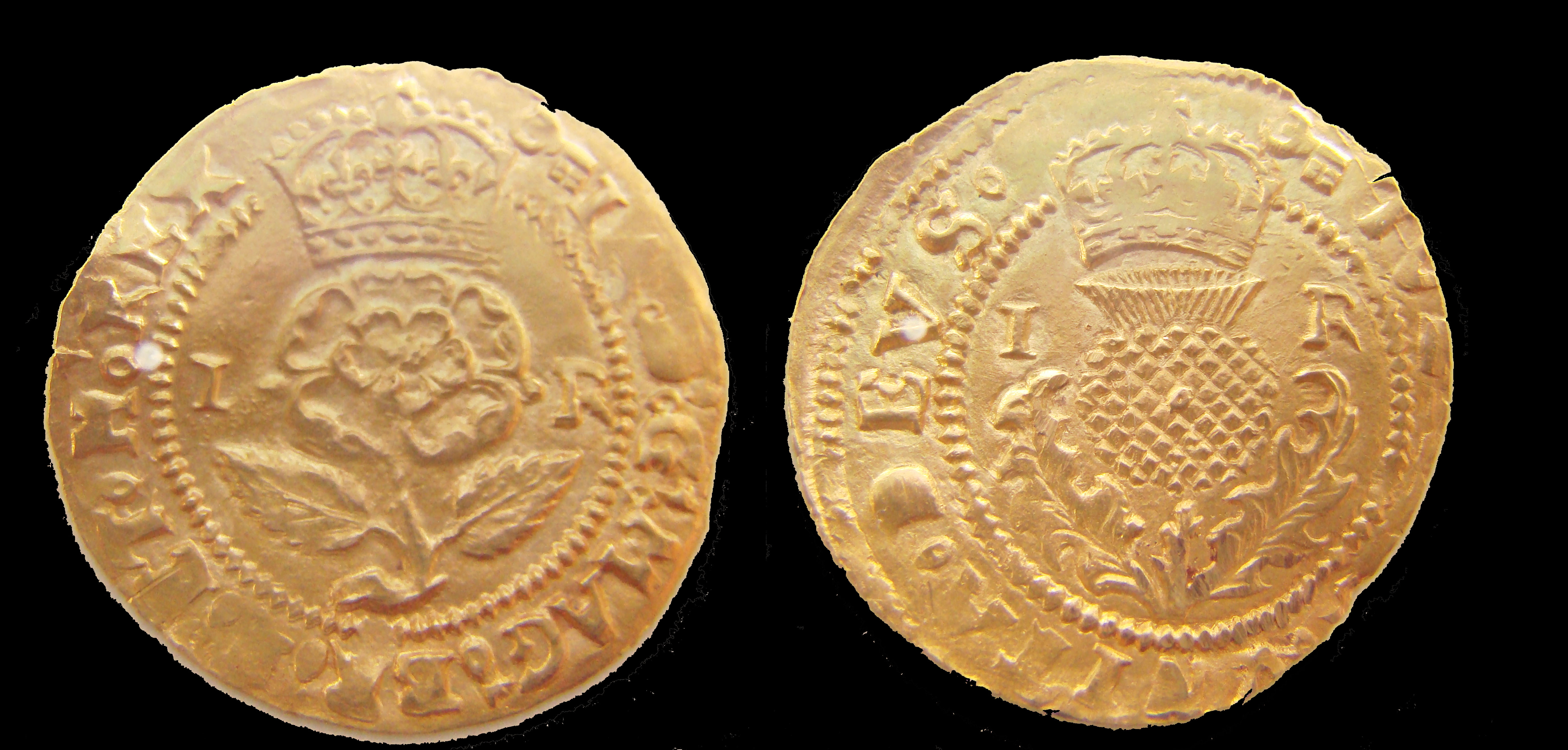
Gold "thistle" crown of James I (1609–1610)

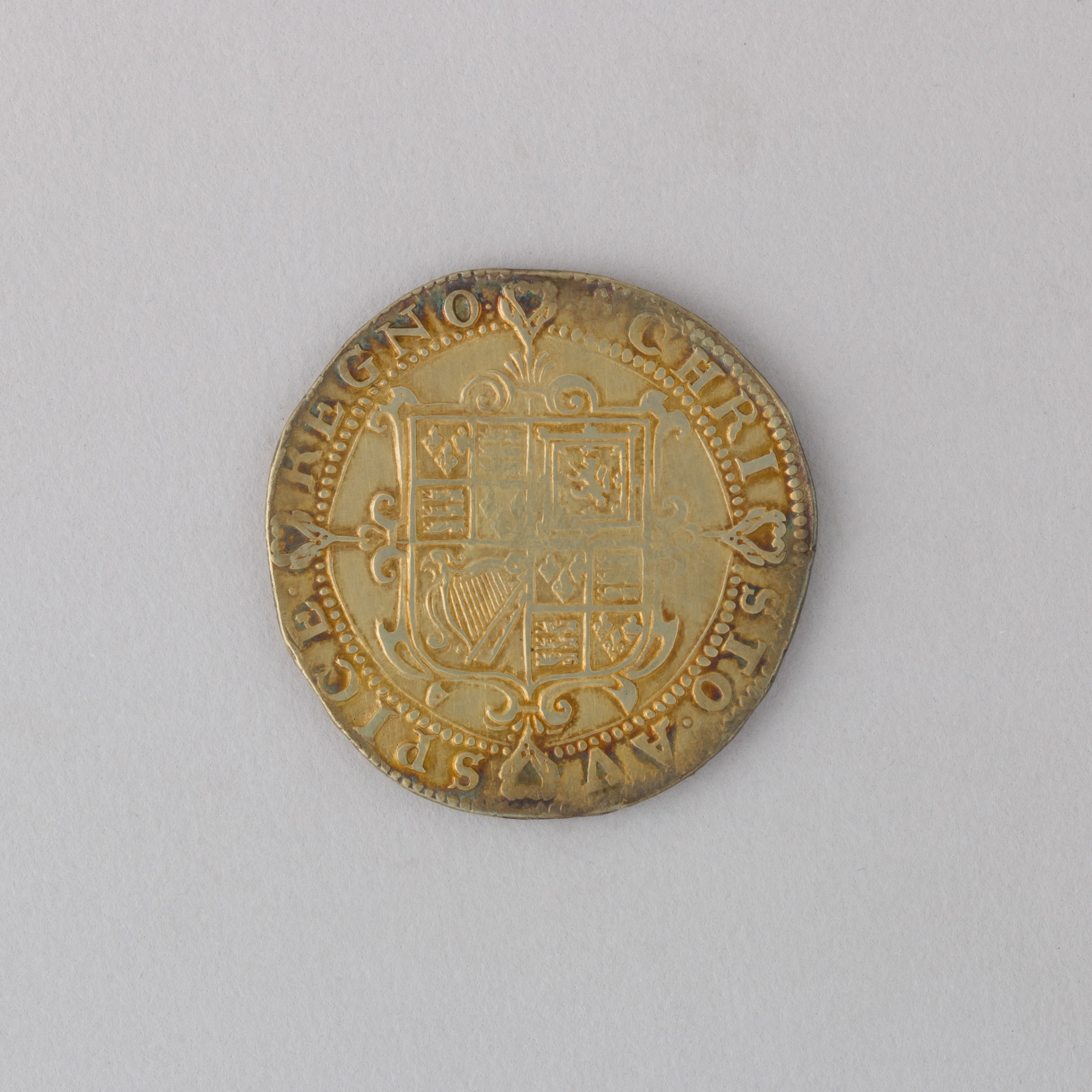
Crown of Charles I (1625)

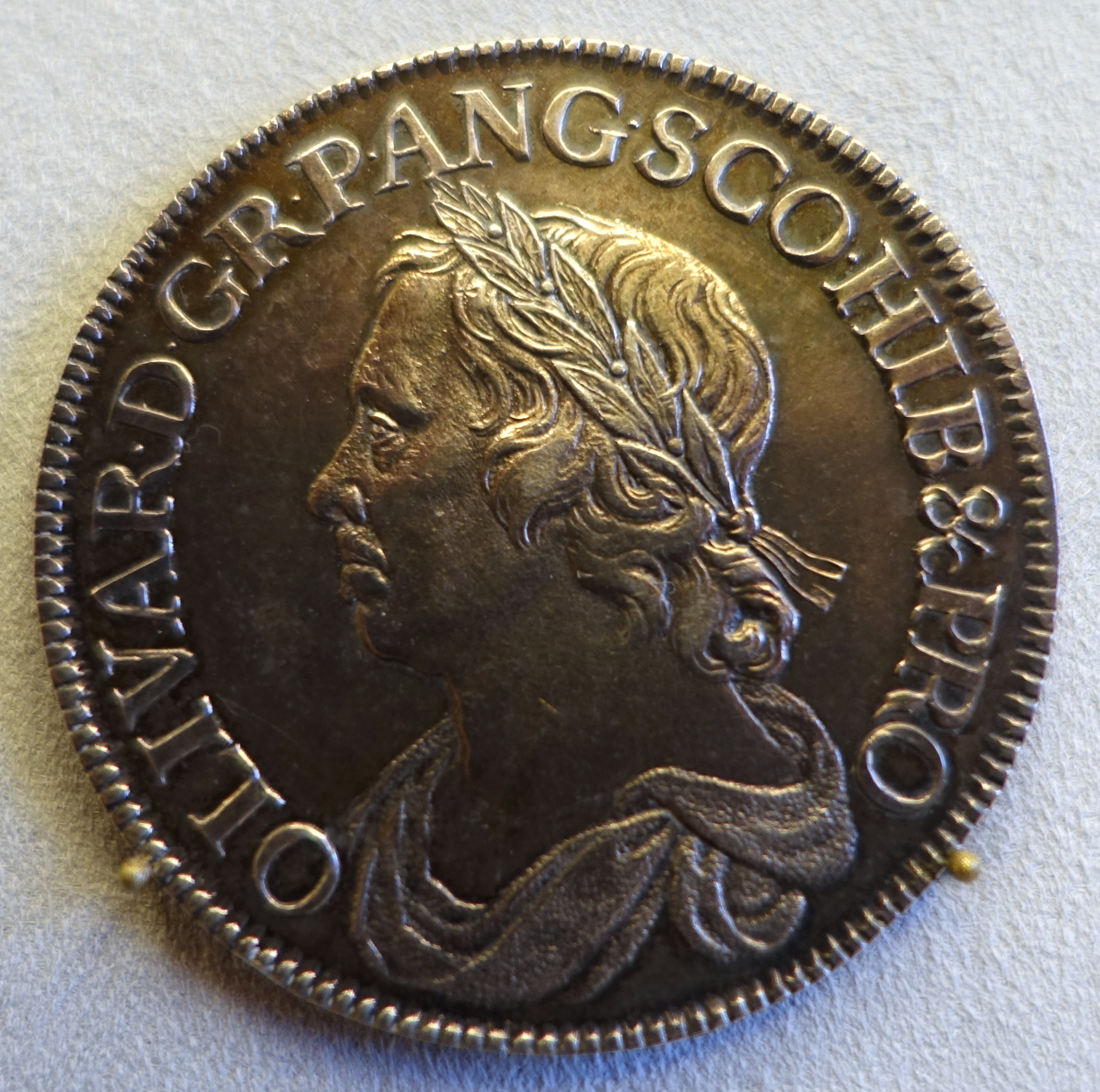
Crown of the Commonwealth (1658)

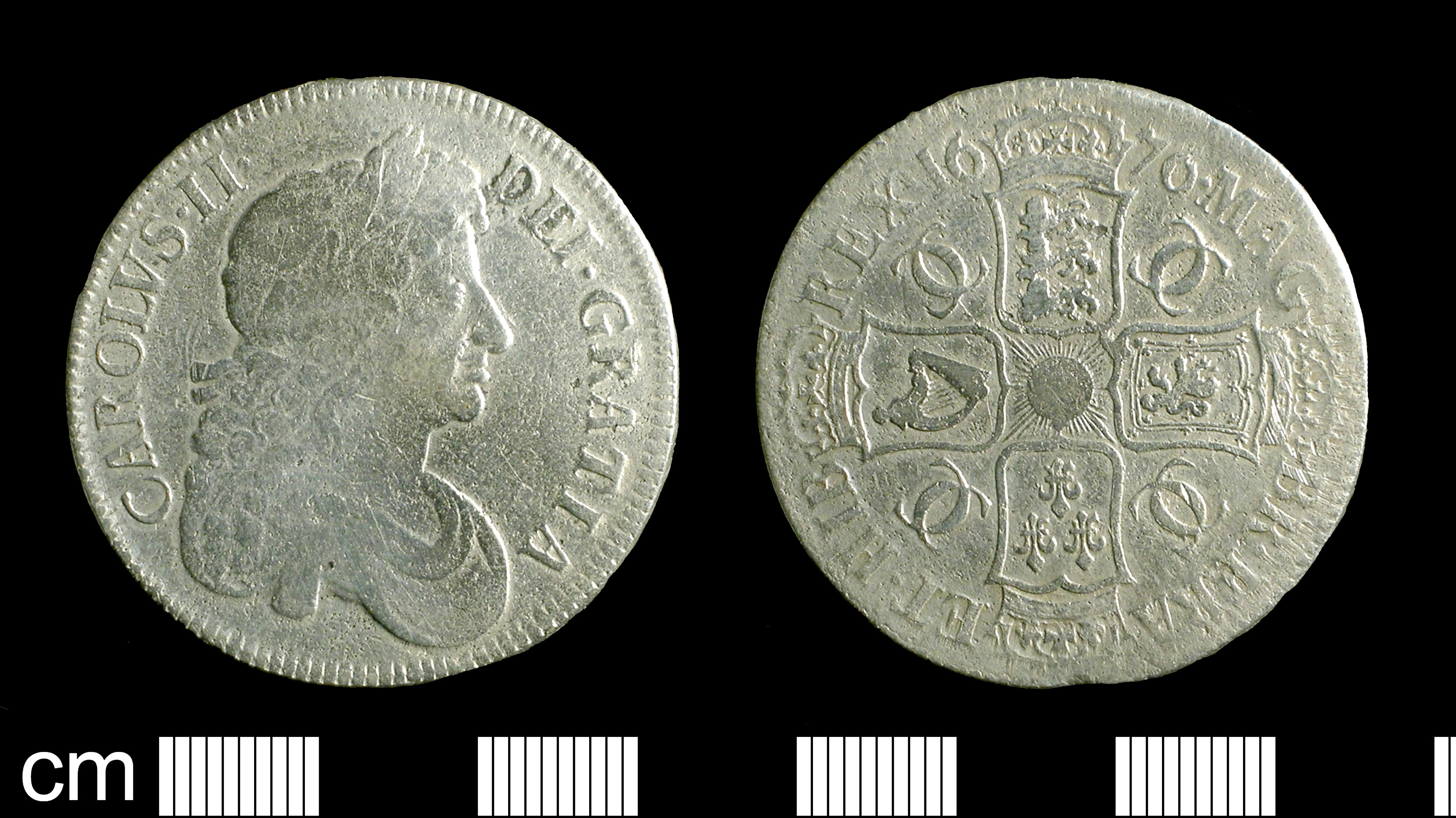
Crown of Charles II (1676)

Crown of William III (1695)

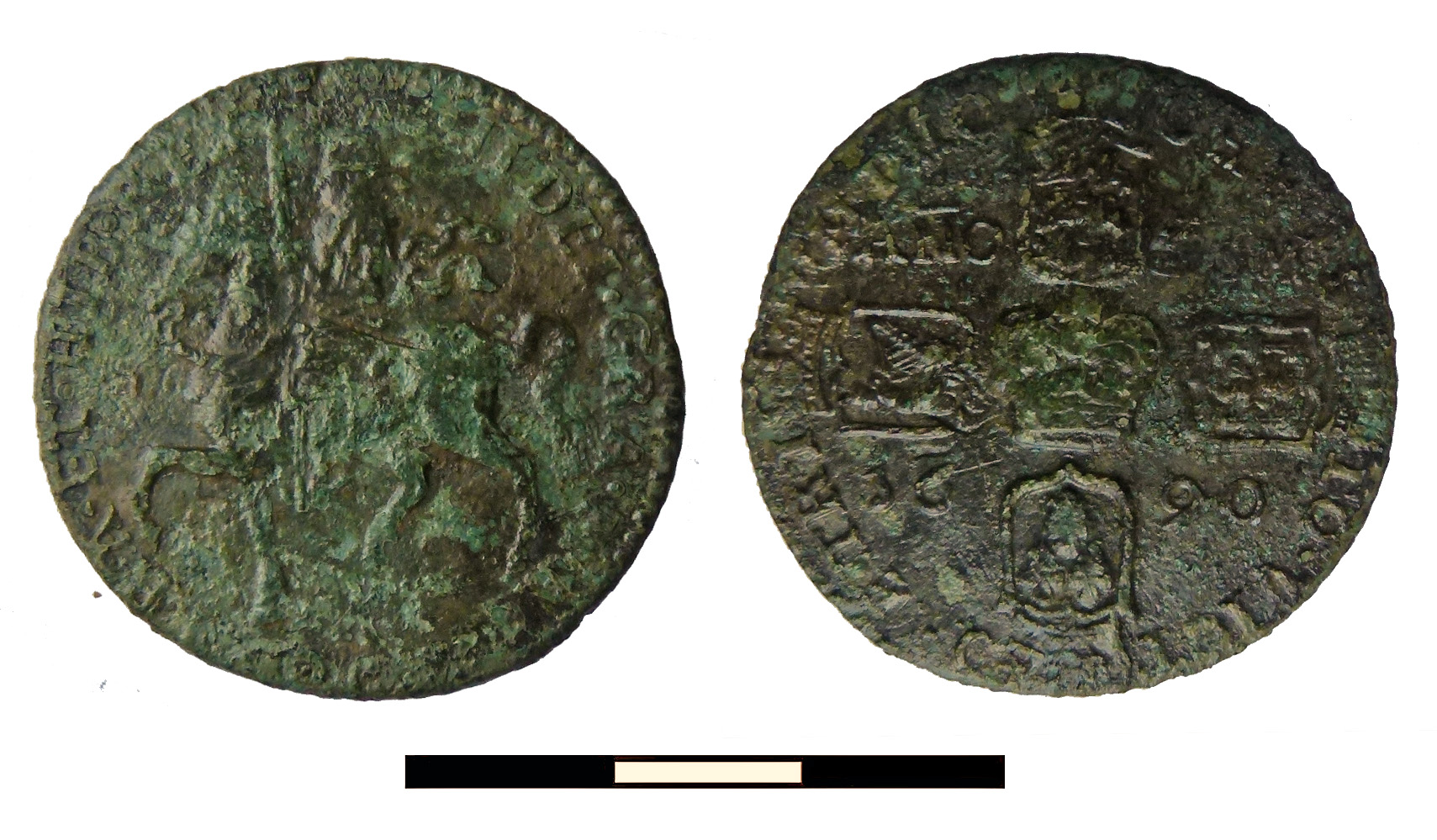
Gun money crown (base metal) of James II (1695)

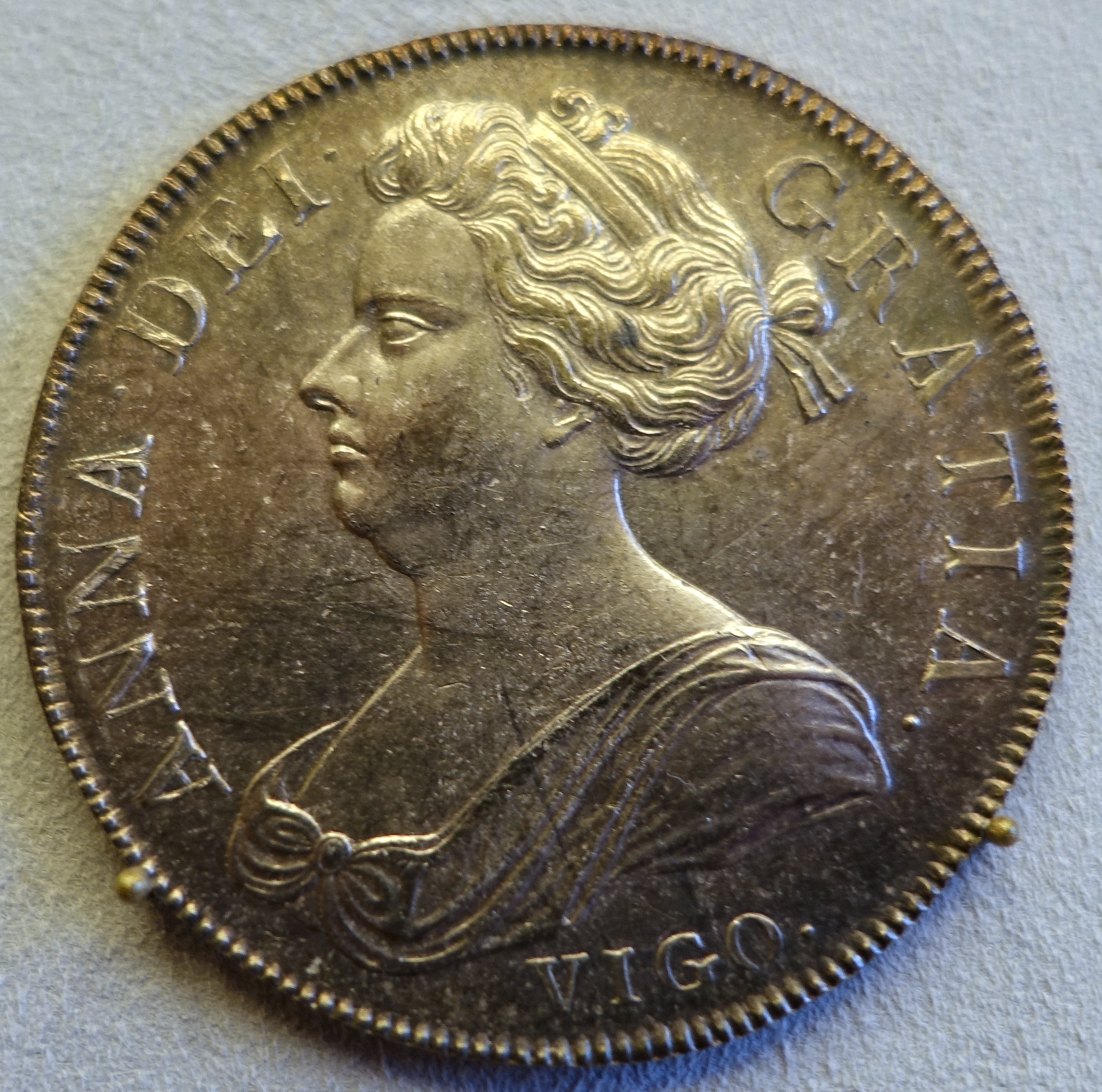
Crown of Anne (1703)

Preceded by —	Crown; 1526–1707	Succeeded by British crown
