= Military of Champa =

Military of the Kingdom of Champa
- ꨣꨯꨢꩊ ꨌꩌꨛꨩ ꩌꨁꨤꨪꨓꨣꨳʾ
- Founded: 192
- Disbanded: 1832
- Service branches: Army; Navy; Provincial Armies and Militias

Leadership
- Commander-in-Chief: King of Champa

Related articles
- History: Military history of Champa: Champa civil wars; Sino–Cham wars; Khmer–Cham wars; Cham–Vietnamese wars

The military of Champa was the primary military force of Champa. The army and navy fought numerous wars and for defending their kingdom against the Chinese, Khmer, and Vietnamese empires, and also thwart piracy, especially Chinese and Malay pirates. The Champa military was known for its skill and innovation in warfare, particularly in shipbuilding and naval warfare. The Champa Kingdom was located in a strategic position on the coast, which allowed them to develop a strong navy and engage in maritime trade with other kingdoms in the region.

The Champa army used cavalry and elephants in battle, which were intended to charge enemy lines and break their formations. The soldiers were armed with a variety of weapons, including swords, spears, and bows and arrows. They were also skilled in the use of siege weapons and were known to use catapults and other devices to breach enemy defenses.

The Champa navy used advanced shipbuilding techniques and innovative approach to naval warfare. The navy was composed of large warships that were crewed by skilled sailors and soldiers. The Champa navy was known for its use of fire ships, and trebuchets, which were used to launch projectiles at enemy vessels.

However, despite their regional and naval power, the Khmer and Dai Viet empires eventually defeated the Chams. After several wars, the Khmer Empire conquered Champa in the 12th century, and the Dai Viet Empire conquered Champa in the 15th century. The Chams were eventually assimilated into the Vietnamese culture, and their naval power declined. However, their legacy as skilled seafarers and shipbuilders has endured. The Champa Kingdom's military legacy continues to be felt today and is a testament to their skill and ingenuity in the field of military technology.

== History ==
The Kingdom of Champa was founded in the second century, and the kingdom faced threats from neighboring kingdoms. The Champa military was founded as a means of protecting the kingdom's borders and maintaining its independence. According to legends and oral traditions, the Champa military was initially composed of small groups of warriors who were organized into local militias. These militias were responsible for defending their local communities and were led by local leaders who were appointed by the king. As the kingdom grew and faced increasing external threats, the Champa military became more organized and centralized.

=== Champa Civil Wars ===
Champa Civil Wars were conflicts throughout the history of the Champa Kingdom. These civil wars were typically fought between rival factions or claimants to the throne, and were often sparked by political or economic grievances, and were fought between rival factions or claimants to the throne. Despite the conflicts, the Champa kingdom was able to survive for many centuries, and its legacy continues to be felt today.

The first Champa Civil War took place in the early 6th century, when a prince named Fan Hsiung rebelled against his father, the king of Champa. The rebellion was successful, and Fan Hsiung established himself as the new king of Champa.

In the 8th century, another civil war broke out between two Champa princes who were vying for the throne. The conflict lasted for several years and resulted in the weakening of the Champa kingdom.

In the 10th century, a Champa king named Jaya Simhavarman III was overthrown by a rival claimant to the throne, who established himself as the new king of Champa. The conflict resulted in the splitting of the Champa kingdom into two separate states, with one based in the north and the other based in the south.

In the 14th century, another civil war broke out between rival factions in the Champa court. The conflict was sparked by political grievances and resulted in the weakening of the Champa kingdom.

=== Sino-Cham Wars ===
The Sino-Cham Wars were a series of conflicts that took place between the Chinese and Champa kingdoms during the Tang dynasty in the 7th and 8th centuries. The wars were fought over control of the lucrative trade routes that passed through the region, particularly the maritime trade routes that linked China with Southeast Asia and the Indian Ocean.

The first Sino-Cham War began in 602 AD, when the Chinese emperor launched a naval expedition to the Champa kingdom in retaliation for Champa's support of a rebellion in Chinese-held Vietnam. The Chinese were able to capture several Champa cities and establish garrisons in the region, but were eventually forced to withdraw due to logistical difficulties.

The second Sino-Cham War began in 753 AD, when the Chinese launched another naval expedition to the Champa kingdom in response to Champa's attacks on Chinese merchant ships. The Chinese were able to capture several Champa cities and establish garrisons in the region, but were again forced to withdraw due to logistical difficulties and the outbreak of disease among their troops.

The Sino-Cham Wars had a significant impact on both kingdoms. The Chinese were able to establish a presence in the region and secure their control over the trade routes, while the Champa kingdom was weakened by the conflicts and faced increasing pressure from neighboring kingdoms. However, the wars also led to the exchange of cultural and technological ideas between the two kingdoms, particularly in the areas of shipbuilding and naval warfare.

=== Khmer–Cham wars ===
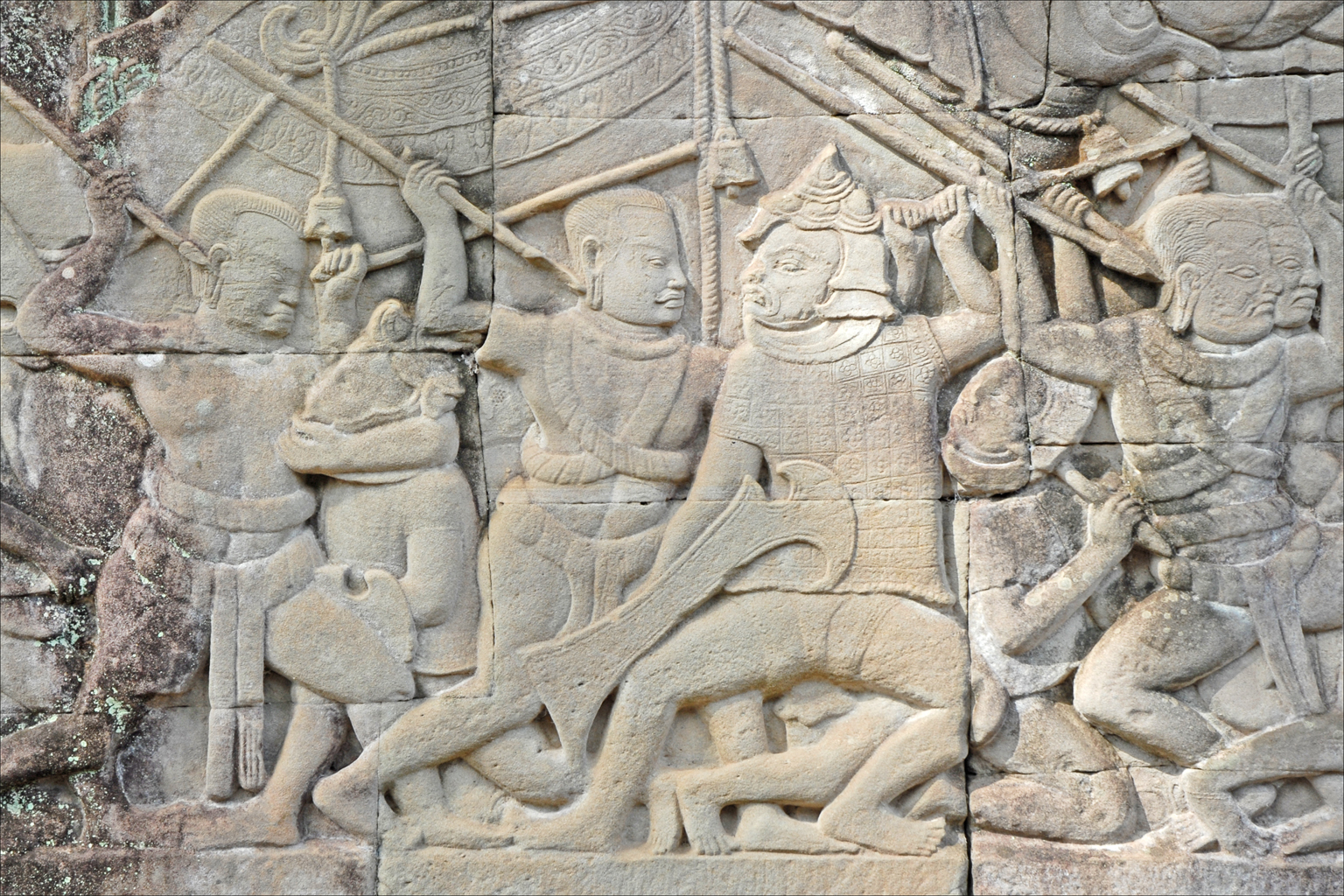
Cham soldier in helmet fighting Khmer soldier, Bas-relief at Bayon temple in Cambodia

The Khmer-Cham Wars were a series of conflicts that took place between the Khmer Empire and the Champa Kingdom during the 9th to 15th centuries. The wars were fought over control of the Mekong Delta region, which was a strategic area for trade and agriculture.

The conflicts began in the 9th century when the Khmer Empire expanded its territory and began to encroach on Champa's borders. The Champa kingdom responded by launching raids on Khmer territory, and the two kingdoms engaged in a series of battles and skirmishes over the next several centuries.

In the 12th century, the Khmer Empire launched a major invasion of Champa, which resulted in the capture of several Champa cities and the establishment of Khmer control over the Mekong Delta region. However, the Champa kingdom was able to regain its independence and launch counter-attacks against the Khmer Empire in the following centuries.

The Khmer-Cham Wars had a significant impact on both kingdoms. The Khmer Empire was able to expand its territory and gain control over the Mekong Delta region, which helped to fuel its economic and cultural growth. However, the wars also weakened the Khmer Empire and left it vulnerable to outside invasions, particularly from the Thai kingdoms.

The Champa kingdom was also weakened by the conflicts and faced increasing pressure from neighboring kingdoms. The wars contributed to the decline of the Champa kingdom and its eventual conquest by the Vietnamese in the late 15th century.

=== Cham-Vietnamese wars ===
The Cham-Vietnamese wars were a series of conflicts that took place between the Champa Kingdom and various Vietnamese kingdoms over several centuries. The wars were fought over control of the central and southern regions of Vietnam, which were strategic areas for trade and agriculture.

The conflicts began in the 10th century when the Vietnamese began to expand their territory and encroach on Champa's borders. The Champa kingdom responded by launching raids on Vietnamese territory, and the two kingdoms engaged in a series of battles and skirmishes over the next several centuries.

In the 15th century, the Vietnamese were able to gain the upper hand in the conflicts and launched a major invasion of Champa. The Vietnamese were able to capture several Champa cities and establish their control over the region. The Champa kingdom was weakened by the conflicts and faced increasing pressure from neighboring kingdoms.

The Cham-Vietnamese wars had a significant impact on both kingdoms. The Vietnamese were able to expand their territory and gain control over the central and southern regions of Vietnam, which helped to fuel their economic and cultural growth. However, the wars also left the Vietnamese kingdom vulnerable to outside invasions, particularly from the Chinese.

The Champa kingdom was weakened by the conflicts and faced increasing pressure from neighboring kingdoms. The wars contributed to the decline of the Champa kingdom and its eventual conquest by the Vietnamese in the late 15th century. Although Champa fell, they were eventually vassalized by Vietnam and forced to move their capital to Panduranga while maintaining what was left of the armed forces.

==== Trinh-Nguyen War ====
During the Trinh-Nguyen War where the Le Dynasty was facing political instability between two powerful military families, Champa came under suzerainty by the Nguyen Lords in 1611. They revolted against the Nguyen dictatorship six times throughout but lost more territory to them.

==== Tây Sơn wars ====
During the Tây Sơn wars, the rebellion thrusted the Nguyen Lords out of power. However, Champa was again torn by civil war between those who supported the Tay Son Dynasty led by Po Tisuntiraidapuran and those who supported the Nguyen Lords led by Po Krei Brei and Po Ladhuanpuguh. Eventually Po Tisuntiraidapuran was captured and executed, allowing the Pro-Nguyen Cham co-rulers to have Champa side with them turning the tide of the war against the rebellion paving the way to the Nguyen Dynasty.

=== Conflict with the Europeans ===
Champa helped Cambodia during the Cambodian–Spanish War, which resulted in delivering a fiasco to the Spanish conquistadors. Governor of Manila, Luis Pérez Dasmariñas (fl. 1593–96) sent a letter to the court of king Philip II in late 1595, antagonizing the Cham king as "a vicious dangerous tyrant who was treacherous and full of evil deeds," while his second letter suggested that just around 200–300 Spanish soldiers and 500 local mercenaries would be needed to conquer Champa. During that time, the Cham were remembered by Spanish, Portuguese, and Dutch merchants and seamen as ferocious pirates of the South China Sea who numerously boarded merchant ships, plundering cargos, kidnapping crew members, and routinely took European hostages to slavery. Cham kings were described to be at least involved or actively encouraging raids against foreign ships.

=== Rebellions ===
During the Nguyen Dynasty, Minh Mạng succeeded his father and enacted repressive acts against ethnic minorities, predominantly the Chams and the Montagnards. He repressed their freedom of religion banning Hinduism, Islam, and Christianity forcing them to assimilate to Vietnamese culture, and allowed Vietnamese settlers to expropriate their land. This incited armed uprisings against him and any Pro-Viet Cham official.

==== Ja Lidong rebellion ====
In August 1822, Ja Lidong from Malathit (southwest of Phan Thiết) led a Cham uprising against Minh Mang's harsh mandatory levies and were advancing toward Bình Thuận, posing a threat to densely populated areas of Bình Thuận where the (Vietnamese) Kinh were majority residents. Furious with news of the rebellion, Po Klan Thu requested Minh Mang for help, and Minh Mang immediately approved. Po Klan Thu was enthroned shortly after as ruler of Champa but a "commissioner of Champa" from the eyes of the Vietnamese, still he wasn't able to restrain discontent among the Chams. After receiving the investiture, Po Klan Thu returned to Panduranga's capital Phan Rí, while Ja Lidong's forces had captured many regions and blown up a strategic fort in Thị Linh.

In February 1823, the Cham royal court assembled an army, assisted by Kinh militia under the command of Thái Văn Thuận. From Long Hương, Phan Rí and Phú Hài, they began hunting down the rebels of Ja Lidong, engaged and defeated them. The army of Ja Lidong however did not disintegrate but retreated westward to the Mekong Delta, which was under the governance of the Viceroyalty of Saigon. The current viceroy of Saigon, Lê Văn Duyệt, sent envoy Nguyễn Văn Châu to meet Ja Lidong and made a compromise. After the deal has been facilitated, Ja Lidong agreed to surrender his arms and army peacefully to Lê Văn Duyệt.

==== Nduai Kabait rebellion ====
Nduai Kabait, a formal Cham official and military general incited a rebellion against the Nguyen Imperial Court. Starting from upland Dong Nai (Dong-Nai Thuong), he urged Chams as far away as in Khánh Hòa and Phú Yên to rise up against the Vietnamese. Minh Mang ordered local troops joining Po Klan Thu to put down the rebellion. The army of Khánh Hòa and Phú Yên attacked on Kỳ Tuân fort while Po Klan Thu was leading his army to Dong Nai Thuong. Due to rough mountainous terrains and densely forested roads, Po Klan Thu had to retreat.

In Khánh Hòa and Phú Yên, Minh Mang issued a total liquidation of the rebels. But in Panduranga, Po Klan Thu opened a conference with the leadership of the rebels. Both sides agreed to reach a peaceful reconciliation. But when Nduai Kabait's delegation arrived in Po Klan Thu's fort, one of the king's representative officials ordered troops to arrest the attaché, all of Nduai Kabait's troops and tortured them. Finally, they put two of Nduai Kabait's commanders on a pyre and burned them to death, then grind their bodies into small pieces of human meat and distributed them to those prisoners. Panicked of this brutal retribution, all the prisoners immediately laid their arms and surrendered to that official, putting an end to Nduai Kabait's rebellion. After having the revolt suppressed, Minh Mang began to orchestrate his Vietnamization-the cultural assimilation, on the Chams.

==== Katip Sumat uprising ====
Katip Sumat, a Muslim Cleric waged a jihad against Vietnam for their repressive policies, but they were repressed by not only by 1,000 well equipped armed forces but also religious ideological infighting between him and Ja Thak Wa.

==== Ja Thak Wa uprising ====
Ja Thak Wa (Thầy Điền or Điền Sư), launched another revolt against Vietnamese in 1834. Ja Thak Wa chose Chek Bicham (Phố Châm Sơn) as his base area; he crowned Po War Palei (La Bôn Vương), a son-in-law of the last deputy ruler Po Dhar Kaok (Nguyễn Văn Nguyên), as the new Champa king. The rebels attacked Ninh Thuận, Bình Thuận, Khánh Hòa and Phú Yên. They were supported by Montagnard in Central Highlands.

The rebellion was put down in July 1835, though both Ja Thak Wa and Po War Palei were killed in Phan Rang earlier in May. In the same year, two Cham leaders, Po Phaok The (Nguyễn Văn Thừa) and Po Dhar Kaok (Nguyễn Văn Nguyên) were executed by the Emperor.

== Organization ==
The Champa kingdom had a relatively small and poorly-organized military compared to its powerful neighbors, the Khmer and Dai Viet empires. They did not have a well-defined military hierarchy with ranks like modern armies. However, distinctions were likely made between ordinary soldiers, officers, and high-ranking leaders. Their ranks consists of a commander-in-chief (Tien tong), generals (Tong binh), colonels (Tien si), and captains (Si binh). The officers in the Champa military were likely appointed by the king or other high-ranking officials. Their responsibilities may have included training and leading troops, as well as managing logistics and supplies. The high-ranking leaders in the Champa military such as generals were likely members of the royal family or other nobility and the low-ranking leaders were likely commoners. The generals were responsible for leading armies, while the colonels lead regiments and battalions and captains led companies. They have had overall command of the army and were responsible for making strategic decisions and negotiating alliances with other powers. The Champa Navy was a formidable force that allowed the Chams to dominate trade and commerce in Southeast Asia. Their navy was used for warfare and exploration, marketing, and transportation of goods. The Chams were known for their seafaring skills, and they had established trade routes across the Indian Ocean and the South China Sea, which allowed them to trade with other kingdoms and empires in the region.

=== Kshatriyas ===
A class of warrior-nobles responsible for protecting the king and his family, as well as defending the kingdom's borders. These Kshatriyas were known for their military prowess and were considered to be a respected and noble class within the Champa society. They were often rewarded with land and titles for their service to the king and were expected to maintain a high level of martial skill and loyalty to the royal family. The tradition of naming warrior-nobles after the Kshatriyas is likely related to the belief in the protective power of these door guardians in Hindu and Buddhist traditions. By naming their warriors after the Kshatriyas, the Champa kingdom was invoking the power of these protective figures to defend their kingdom and ensure the safety of their rulers. Overall, the Kshatriyas played an important role in the religious and cultural traditions of the Champa kingdom, as well as in their military and political institutions.

=== Haluwbilau ===
The haluwbilau or haluw bilang were the elite warriors and military officers of both the army and navy. The term "haluwbilau" is derived from the Cham language and means "one who leads the army". The "haluwbilau" were highly respected members of Cham society and were known for their bravery, skill, and leadership on the battlefield. The "haluwbilau" were also known for their distinctive clothing and equipment, which set them apart from other warriors in the Champa army. They wore brightly colored dresses made from silk or other delicate fabrics, often adorned with jewelry and other decorative items. The "haluwbilau" were selected from among the most talented and capable warriors of the Cham people and were trained in a variety of martial arts and military tactics. They were responsible for leading Cham armies into battle and defending their communities against outside threats. In addition to their military duties, the "haluwbilau" also played an essential role in the political and social life of the Cham people. They were often called upon to mediate disputes and guide the community in crisis. The "haluwbilau" was an essential part of Cham society and played a crucial role in defending their people and culture. While their role as military officers has primarily disappeared in modern times, the legacy of the "haluwbilau" lives on as a symbol of the courage and bravery of the Cham people.

== Royal Guard ==
The Royal Guards of Champa were a group of elite soldiers who were responsible for protecting the king and his family, as well as maintaining order and security within the Champa kingdom. They were highly skilled and well-trained warriors known for their loyalty, discipline, and martial prowess. They were responsible for patrolling the palace and its surroundings, as well as accompanying the king on his travels and participating in military campaigns. The Royal Guards were also tasked with enforcing the laws and regulations of the kingdom, and were authorized to arrest and punish those who violated them. The Royal Guards of Champa were highly respected and held in great esteem by the people of the kingdom. They were considered to be a symbol of the king's power and authority, and were often used as a show of military might in public ceremonies and events. The Royal Guards played an important role in the political and military institutions of the Champa kingdom, and their legacy is still celebrated in the culture and traditions of Vietnam, where the kingdom was located.

== Army ==
=== Central Army ===
The Chams traditionally used large numbers of soldiers ("baol") for their infantry, cavalry divisions, and elephant corps. While the Champa army was not as well-equipped or well-organized as their more powerful neighbors, they maintained a significant presence in the region and were a formidable force in their own right. Infantry soldiers in the Champa military were recruited from the general population and were often peasants or commoners. In addition, the Champa kingdom had a tradition of martial arts and combat training practiced by both men and women. This training included techniques for hand-to-hand combat, weapons use, and individual and group fighting tactics. The cavalry soldiers were horseback riders armed with similar weapons. They wore armor similar to the infantry but were more mobile and could be used for flanking and maneuvering. Elephants were also an important part of the Champa army. These animals were typically ridden by specially trained soldiers armed with spears, swords, or other weapons. They mounted crossbows on the backs of war elephants making them particularly effective at breaking enemy formations and causing chaos on the battlefield.

=== Principality armies ===
The principality armies were an important component of the kingdom's military strategy. The Champa Kingdom was divided into several principalities, each of which was governed by a local ruler who answered to the king. These local rulers were responsible for maintaining order and security in their regions, which included organizing and maintaining a local army. The principality armies were composed of local militias, which were composed of able-bodied men from the local community and were responsible for defending their local communities and were led by local leaders who were appointed by the governor of the province. The provincial armies were responsible for maintaining order and security in their respective provinces, as well as defending against external threats. They were organized and trained in a similar fashion to the central Champa military, with a focus on cavalry and elephant warfare, as well as the use of siege weapons and naval tactics. They coordinated by the central Champa military, which was responsible for overseeing the military operations of the kingdom as a whole. The central military provided training, supplies, and strategic guidance to the principality armies, and would have coordinated their efforts in times of war or emergency.

== Navy ==
The Chams were skilled seamen who employed various flexible naval warfare tactics, including blockading ports and mines. According to an article published by National Geographic in 2014, Champa's navy was considered unrivaled. They were able to maintain a significant presence along the coasts of Southeast Asia. Their marines and sailors engaged in hand-to-hand combat and used fire-arrows to set ships on fire. The Chams also used a technique called "ramming", in which they would intentionally collide with enemy ships to sink or damage them. The Champa Navy maintained its naval power for several centuries due to its skilled shipbuilders and sailors and its use of advanced weapons and tactics. The Chams were also skilled in maritime engineering and shipbuilding and used advanced technologies such as water pumps and wind-powered mills to help construct their ships. They were able to maintain a significant presence along the coasts of Southeast Asia.

=== Conflicts with Cham pirates ===
The Cham pirates were active in the South China Sea from the late 17th century to the early 19th century. They were based in the coastal areas of Vietnam and Cambodia, feared by merchant ships and navy vessels alike, and were notorious for their brutal tactics and cruelty towards their victims as well as their expertise in seafaring. The Cham pirates were said to have used fast and maneuverable vessels and were known for their ability to outrun and outmaneuver larger ships. They can navigate in shallow waters and launch surprise attacks on enemy ships. The Cham pirates were notorious for their brutality and were said to have killed or enslaved their captives. They were also known for using torture and were said to have used methods such as bamboo shoots under the fingernails or tying their victims to a mast, leaving them to thirst.

To combat these pirates, Champa Kingdom was to station naval patrols along the coast to deter pirate attacks. These patrols were often made up of warships that were armed with cannons and other weapons. The patrols would travel along the coast and intercept any pirate vessels that they encountered, either by engaging them in battle or by boarding and capturing them. Another method used by the Champa Kingdom was to construct defensive fortifications along the coast. These fortifications, which included watchtowers, walls, and gates, were designed to prevent pirates from landing on the coast and to provide a safe haven for Champa's merchant ships. The fortifications were often manned by soldiers who were trained in naval warfare and were equipped with weapons and ammunition. In addition to these defensive measures, the Champa Kingdom also sought to negotiate with Cham pirates and other pirate groups in order to establish a peaceful coexistence. These negotiations often involved the exchange of goods and tribute, as well as the establishment of trade agreements and other diplomatic initiatives.

Regional naval forces, including the Dutch, British, and Chinese navies, eventually suppressed the Cham pirates. The British Royal Navy launched several campaigns against the Cham pirates in the late 18th century, and by the early 19th century, the Cham pirates had primarily disappeared as a significant threat.

=== Ships ===
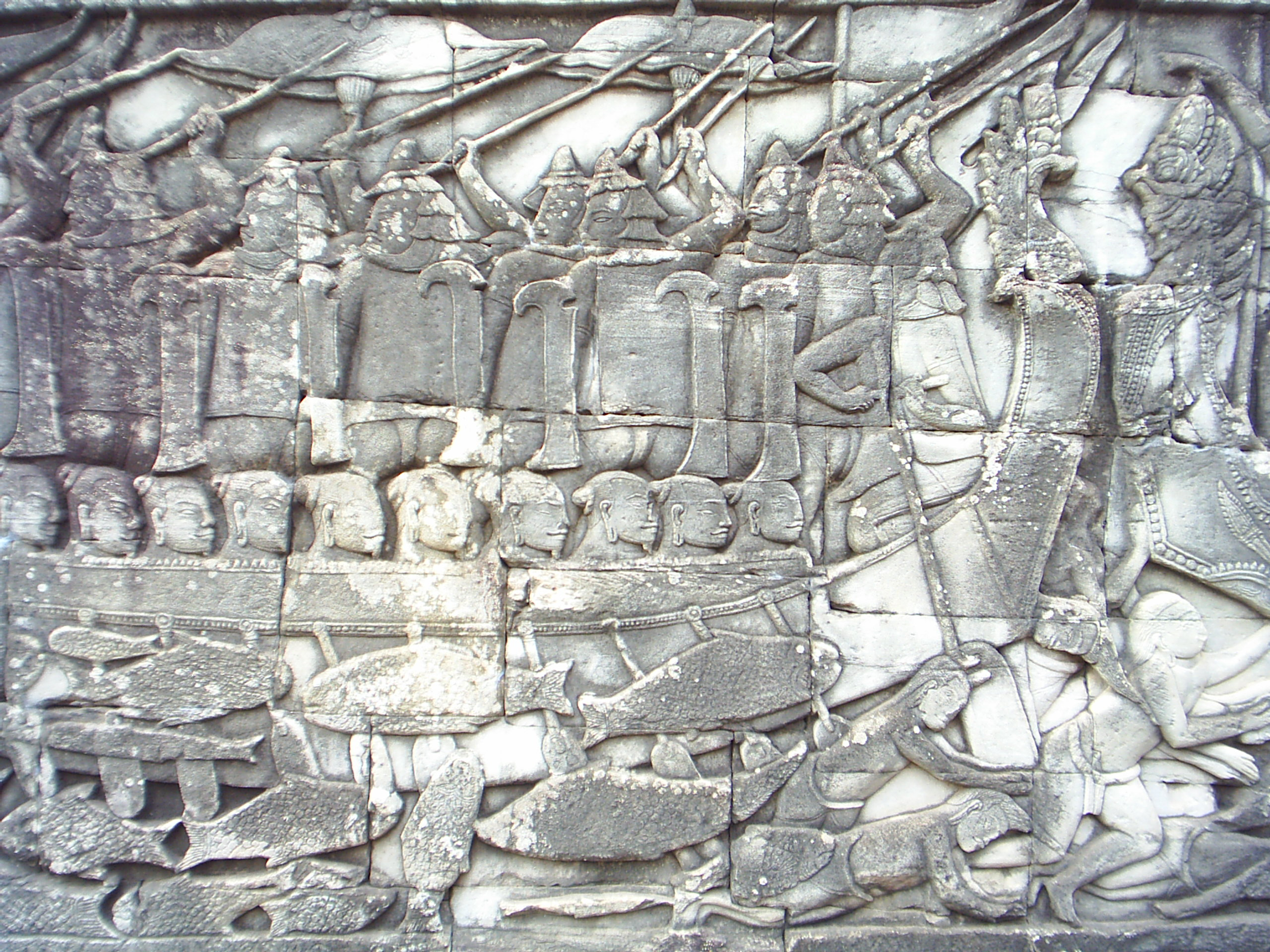
Depiction of a Cham–Khmer naval battle, stone relief at the Bayon.

They are composed of mostly small to medium-sized warships for coastal defense, piracy, and maritime trade and maintain a significant presence along the coasts of Southeast Asia. They built their ships with multiple decks and used advanced rigging techniques to make them faster and more maneuverable and were adapted from traditional Southeast Asian boat designs. Large warships, known as "towers on the water", were up to 60 meters long and had various decks. These ships had different rows of oars and a large crew of soldiers and navigators. The Chams also had smaller ships called "sea-going rafts" propelled by sails and oars. Other large vessels were named "jongs", large sailing ships with multiple masts and a high prow and stern for long-distance trade and could carry large amounts of cargo and passengers, as well as weapons and troops for military expeditions. Smaller, faster ships were called "sampans", which were used for scouting and patrolling. Another type of small warship was the " katamaran", a smaller vessel with two hulls well-suited for navigating shallow waters and river estuaries. They were often used for piracy and coastal raids. The Chams also used "fire ships", vessels loaded with flammable materials set alight and used to attack enemy ships. They used dragon boats on rivers and lakes to carry many marines to engage the Khmer and Viet vessels in ramming and close-quarters combat. In addition to these warships, the Champa navy relied on smaller boats and canoes for surveillance, fishing, and transporting goods and troops along rivers and coastal areas.

== Equipment ==
=== Armor ===
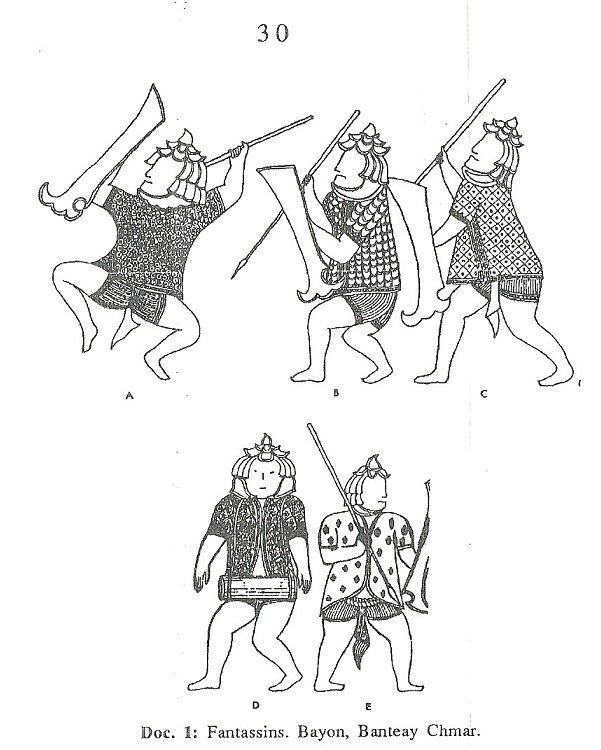
12th-century Champa marines wore various armor.

The Cham military wore various armor such as rattan armor, lacquered leather, buff coats, padded jackets, and metal armor such as scale armour, lamellar, chainmail, and steel cuirass. The exact type of armor may vary depending on the period and specific circumstances. Still, it generally consisted of helmets, chest plates, arm guards, and leg guards. The helmets worn by Cham soldiers were typically made of metal and covered the head and neck with a faceguard or visor to protect the face. The chest plates were also metal and covered the torso with additional leaves or chains to protect the shoulders and back. The arm and leg guards were typically made of flexible lacquered leather, allowing greater mobility. They were sometimes reinforced with metal or other materials to provide additional protection. In addition to armor, Cham soldiers also carried shields, typically made of wood and covered with animal hide or leather. These shields were often decorated with intricate designs or symbols, which may have had religious or cultural significance. Overall, the armor Cham soldiers wore was designed to protect them from enemy weapons and projectiles while allowing for mobility and flexibility on the battlefield.

=== Weapons ===
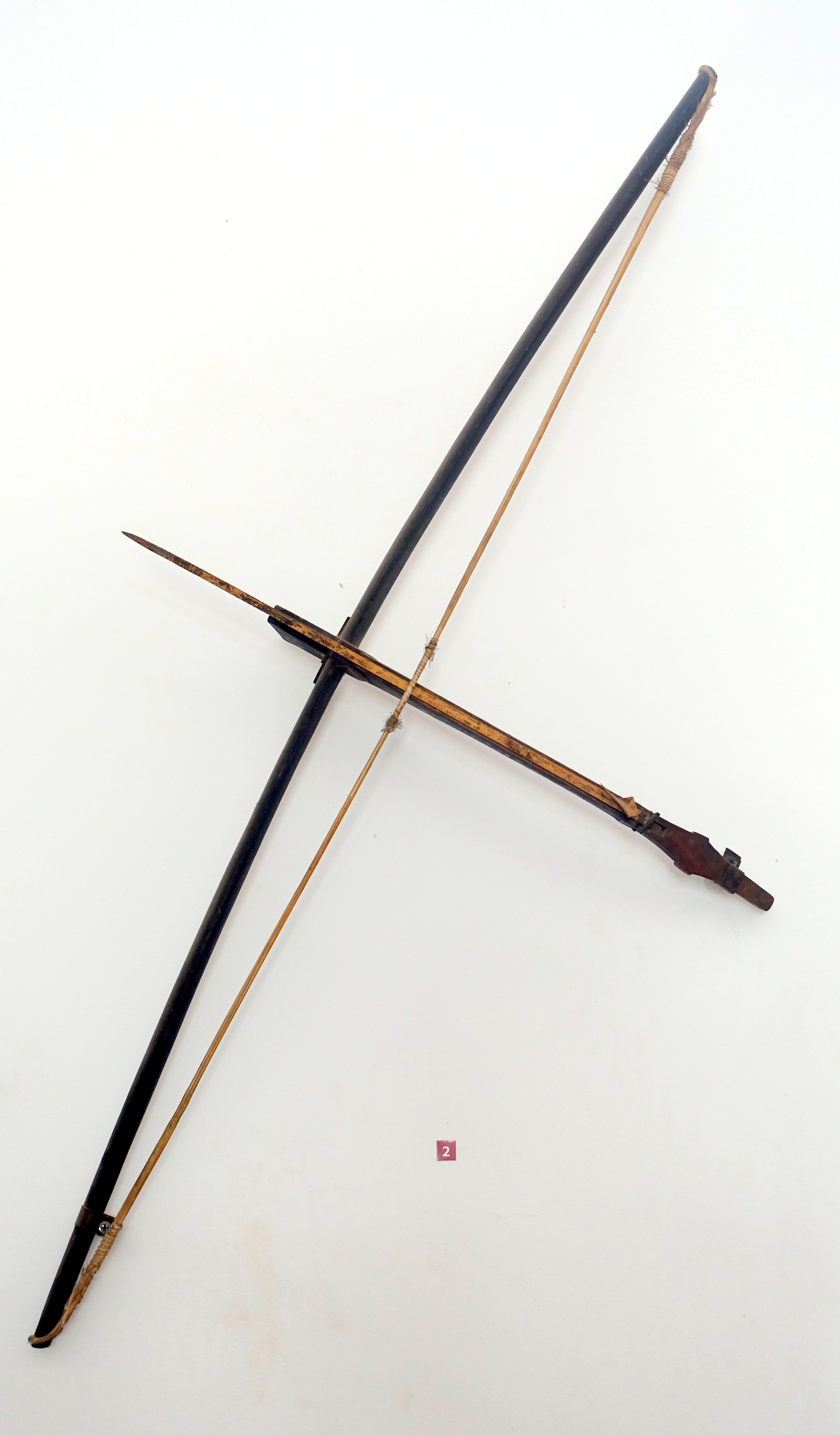
Crossbow, Hre, Vietnam Museum of Ethnology, Hanoi, Vietnam

The Cham soldiers used various weapons, including swords, spears, bows, arrows, and crossbows. Swords were a standard weapon used by Cham soldiers, and they were typically made of iron or steel and had curved blades. The length of the sword varied depending on the specific type. Spears were also a popular weapon among Cham soldiers, typically made of wood with a metal tip. They could be used for thrusting or throwing, depending on the situation. Bows and arrows were another essential part of the Cham soldier's arsenal. The Chams were known for using "repeating crossbows" on their boats. These crossbows could fire multiple arrows at a time, making them a formidable weapon against enemy ships. They used trebuchets to lay siege to cities and retrofitted them on their ships. These weapons were used for ranged attacks and could be particularly effective in open terrain. The bows were typically wood or bamboo, and the arrows had metal or bone tips.

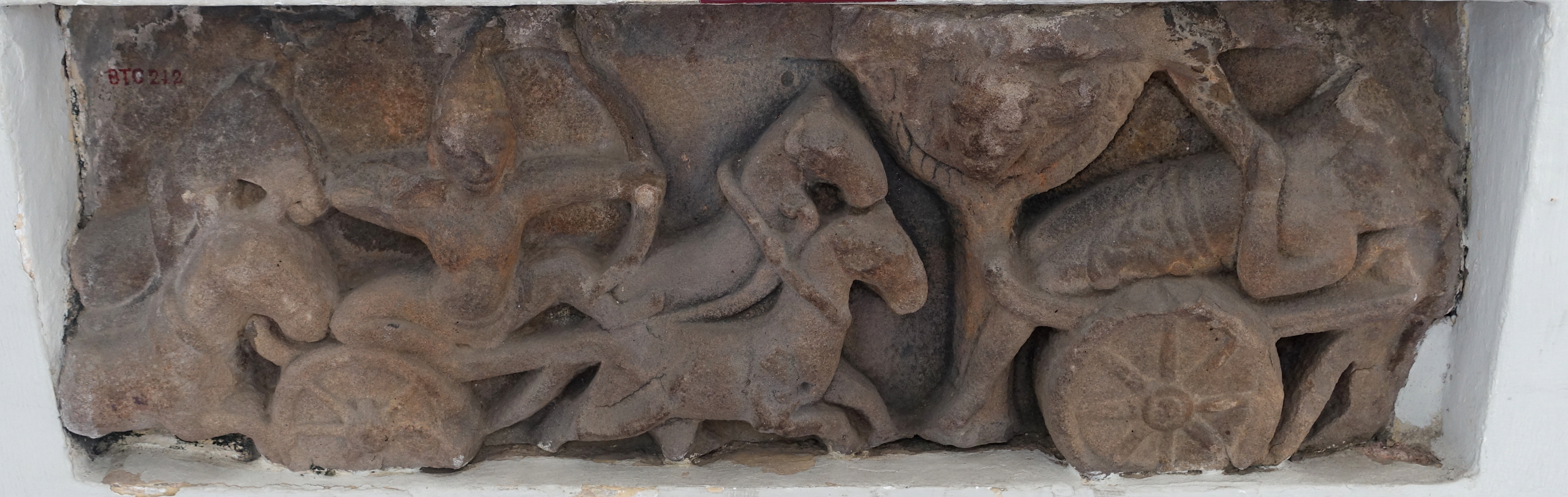
Sculpture of Cham mounted archers on chariots. c. 11th–13th century.

On sculptures and reliefs from the 11th–13th centuries there were Cham mounted archers on chariots in. However, it is unclear how widely chariots were used in Champa's military or how long they remained in use. Some scholars suggest that the use of chariots may have been influenced by Indian military traditions, including war elephants and chariots. However, there is little concrete evidence to support this theory. It is also possible that the use of chariots in Champa's military was limited to specific periods or regions and may not have been a widespread practice. The lack of clear references to chariots in historical texts and inscriptions suggests that they were not a defining feature of Champa's military.

==== Gunpowder weapons ====
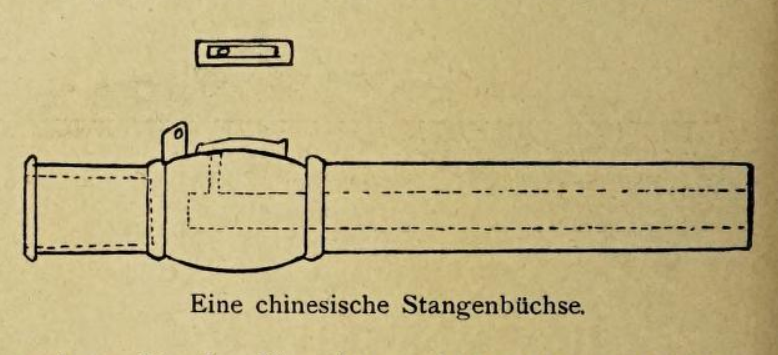
Drawing of a Chinese pole gun found in Java, 1421. It weighed 2.252 kg, had a length of 357 mm, and had a caliber of 16 mm. This gun features a rain cover connected with a hinge, which is now missing. The hinge is still preserved.

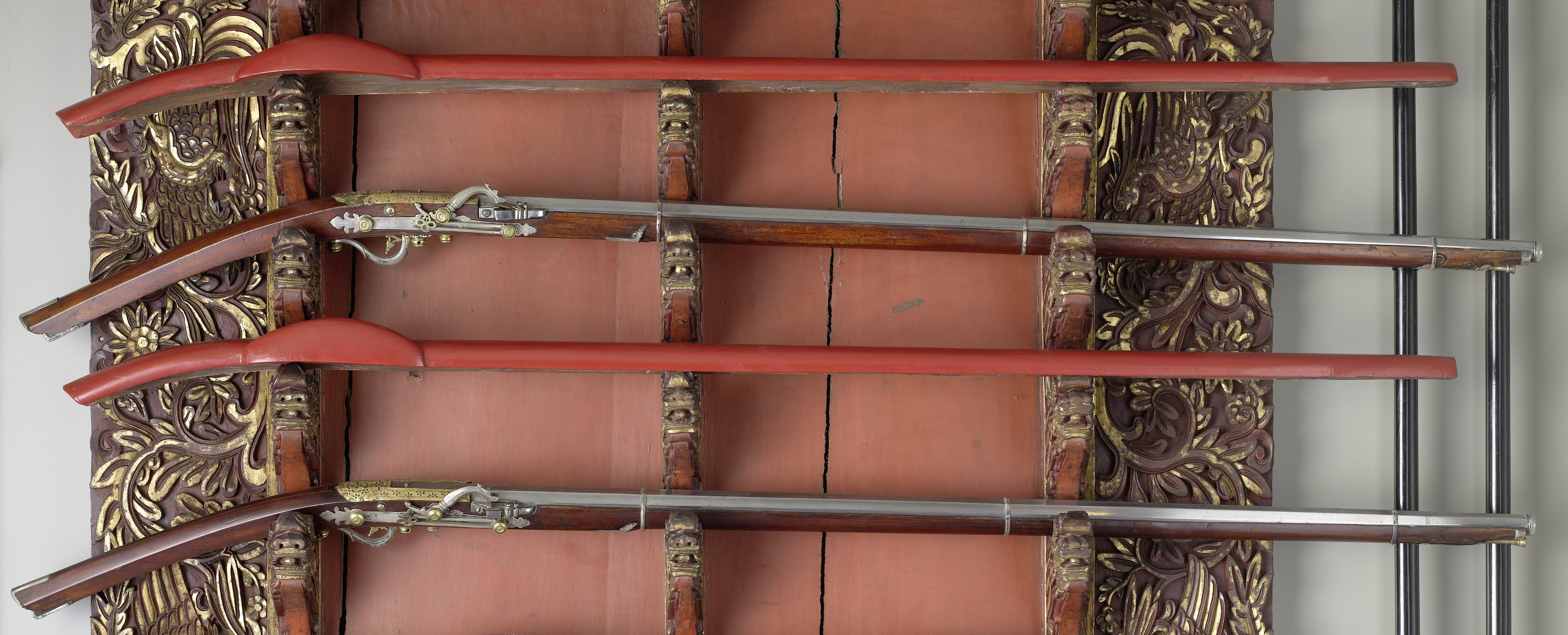
Two Vietnamese arquebuses with their dust cover. From Cornelis Tromp's weapon rack, dated 1650–1679 AD.

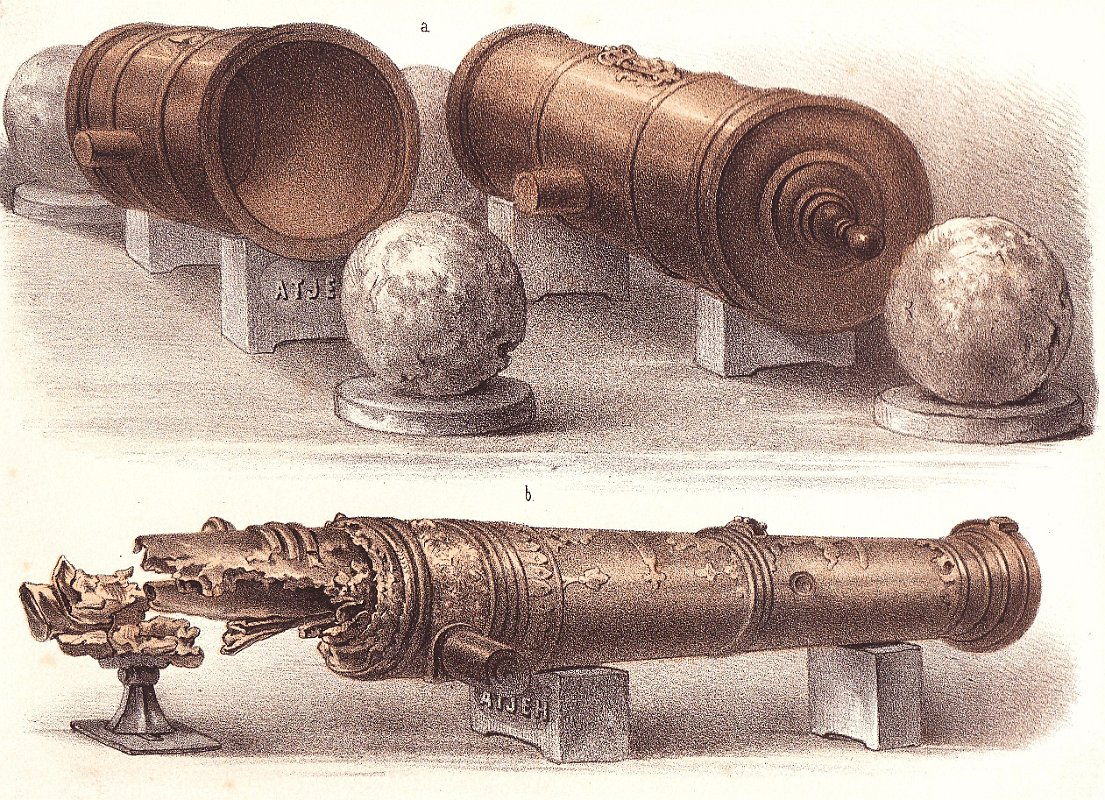
Guns from Aceh, including a broken cannon and two bombards.

Chams acquired these gunpowder weapons through various means.

After the gunpowder age, Chinese firearms—including rockets and handguns—were imported and employed by most Southeast Asian rulers in Dai Viet, Lan Na, and Luchuan. In 1390, the powerful Cham ruler Po Binasuor died in a naval battle. The Vietnamese records (written in chữ Hán) attribute his death to the weapon called the Huochong, long understood as referring to a cannon, but more probably a handgun. These new weapons technology helped shift the balance of power between the two kingdoms.

During the late 14th and early 15th centuries, the Chams obtained some gunpowder weapons through trade or other means from China, their neighboring countries, and European Traders, such as their bombard and early cannons which they rarely retrofitted on their warships to suppress piracy. They even used matchlocks and hand cannons by some armies and likely mounted on the warships and used by the crew to repel attackers or engage in naval battles. However, Champa and Ayutthaya failed to adopt this technology and suffered the consequences.

== Strategy and tactics ==
The Cham army's strategy in battle varied depending on the specific circumstances and the opponent they were facing. However, their military tactics were generally focused on defensive strategies, guerilla warfare, and hit-and-run tactics.

One of the critical defensive strategies used by the Cham army was to fortify their cities and use natural barriers like rivers and mountains to their advantage. This allowed them to defend themselves against invading armies and raiders, making it more difficult for their enemies to penetrate their territory.

Guerilla warfare was also an essential part of the Cham army's strategy. This involved using small, mobile units of soldiers who would launch surprise attacks on enemy forces and then retreat to safety rather than engaging in large-scale battles. These hit-and-run tactics allowed the Cham army to punch above their weight and inflict significant damage on more powerful enemies.

In addition to these defensive and guerilla tactics, the Cham army also relied heavily on alliances and diplomacy to counter the military power of their more powerful neighbors, such as the Khmer and Dai Viet empires. By forming partnerships with other smaller regional polities, the Cham army could pool its resources and defend itself against common enemies.

The Cham army's strategy in battle was focused on defense, guerilla warfare, and hit-and-run tactics rather than engaging in large-scale fighting or trying to conquer their enemies through force of arms. This approach allowed them to defend themselves effectively against more powerful enemies and maintain a significant regional presence.

== See also ==
- Chams
- Champa
- History of Champa
- Vietnam
- History of Vietnam

== Bibliography ==
=== Cham Civil Wars ===
- "The Cham Kingdoms of Southeast Asia" by John K. Whitmore (published in the Journal of Asian Studies)
- "The Cham Civil War: Ethnicity, Empire, and Memory" by Oscar Salemink (published in the Journal of Vietnamese Studies)
- "The Cham in Vietnamese History" by K. W. Taylor (published in the Journal of Asian History)

=== Sino-Cham Wars ===
- "The Chinese Conquest of Champa" by Michael Vickery (published in the Journal of Southeast Asian Studies)
- "The Sino-Cham War of 722-723: The Military Sources and the Problem of the Ch'ing-shih" by David Graff (published in the Journal of the Malaysian Branch of the Royal Asiatic Society)
- "The Sino-Cham War of 722-723 Revisited" by Peter B. Golden (published in the Journal of the Malaysian Branch of the Royal Asiatic Society)

=== Khmer-Cham Wars ===
- "The Khmer Empire and the Chams" by Michael Vickery (published in the Journal of Southeast Asian Studies)
- "The Cham of Vietnam and Their Struggle for National Self-Determination" by William J. Duiker (published in the Journal of Third World Studies)
- "The Khmer Empire and Her Enemies: New Light on the Champa Wars" by Michael Vickery (published in the Journal of the Siam Society)
- "The Khmer and the Chams: Ethnic Relations, War and Peace" by Philippe Le Failler (published in the Journal of Southeast Asian Studies)
- "The Khmer-Cham Wars: A Comparative Perspective" by David Chandler (published in the Journal of Asian Studies)

=== Cham Military and Vietnamese Wars ===
- "The Military History of the Champa Kingdom" by Tran Ky Phuong, published in the Journal of Southeast Asian Studies (2015).
- "The Champa Kingdom and its Military" by H. G. Quaritch Wales, published in the Journal of the Siam Society (1950).
- "The Dai-Viet Warriors: A Study of the Military Elite in the Champa Kingdom" by Nhung Tuyet Tran, published in the Journal of the Economic and Social History of the Orient (2004).
- "The Sea Warriors of the Champa Kingdom" by John K. Whitmore, published in the Journal of Southeast Asian Studies (1975).
- "The Champa Kingdom and Its Successors, 1000-1500" by John K. Whitmore
- "Cham Art: Treasures from the Da Nang Museum, Vietnam" by Emma C. Bunker
- "The Military Institutions of the Champa Kingdom" by Tran Ky Phuong, published in the Bulletin de l'École Française d'Extrême-Orient (1994)
- "The Military Traditions of the Champa Kingdom" by John K. Whitmore, published in the Journal of Southeast Asian Studies (1977)
- "The Cham Kingdoms: Glimpses of an Ancient World" by Arlo Griffiths and John Guy
- "The Chams" by J. C. J. Metcalf
- "Warfare and the Champa State (Fifth to Fifteenth Centuries CE)" by Viktoria Vegh, published in the Journal of Vietnamese Studies (2015)
- "The Oxford Handbook of Warfare in the Classical World" edited by Brian Campbell and Lawrence A. Tritle
- "The Champa Kingdom and its Relationship to Vietnam" by Nguyen Khac Vi, published in the Journal of Southeast Asian Studies (1972)
- "The Cambridge History of Southeast Asia, Volume One, Part One: From Early Times to c. 1500", by John K. Whitmore, published in Cambridge University Press (1992)
- "Southeast Asia in the Age of Commerce, 1450-1680, Volume Two: Expansion and Crisis", by Anthony Reid, published in Yale University Press (1993)

Other:

- Borschberg, Peter (2015). Journal, Memorials and Letters of Cornelis Matelieff de Jonge: Security, Diplomacy and Commerce in 17th-century Southeast Asia. University of Hawaii Press. ISBN 978-9-97169-527-9.
- Coedès, George (1968). Vella, Walter F. (ed.). The Indianized States of Southeast Asia. trans.Susan Brown Cowing. University of Hawaii Press. ISBN 978-0-8248-0368-1.
- Hall, Daniel George Edward (1981). History of South East Asia. Macmillan Education, Limited. ISBN 978-1349165216.
- Maspero, Georges (2002). The Champa Kingdom. White Lotus Co., Ltd. ISBN 9789747534993.
- Kohn, George (1999), Dictionary of Wars, London: Routledge, ISBN 978-1-135-95494-9
- Miksic, John Norman; Yian, Go Geok (2016). Ancient Southeast Asia. Taylor & Francis. ISBN 978-1-317-27903-7.
- Po, Dharma (2013). Le Panduranga (Campa). Ses rapports avec le Vietnam (1802–1835). International Office of Champa.
- Taylor, Keith Weller (1983), The Birth of the Vietnam, University of California Press, ISBN 978-0-52007-417-0
