= Abraham Simon =

17th-century English medallist

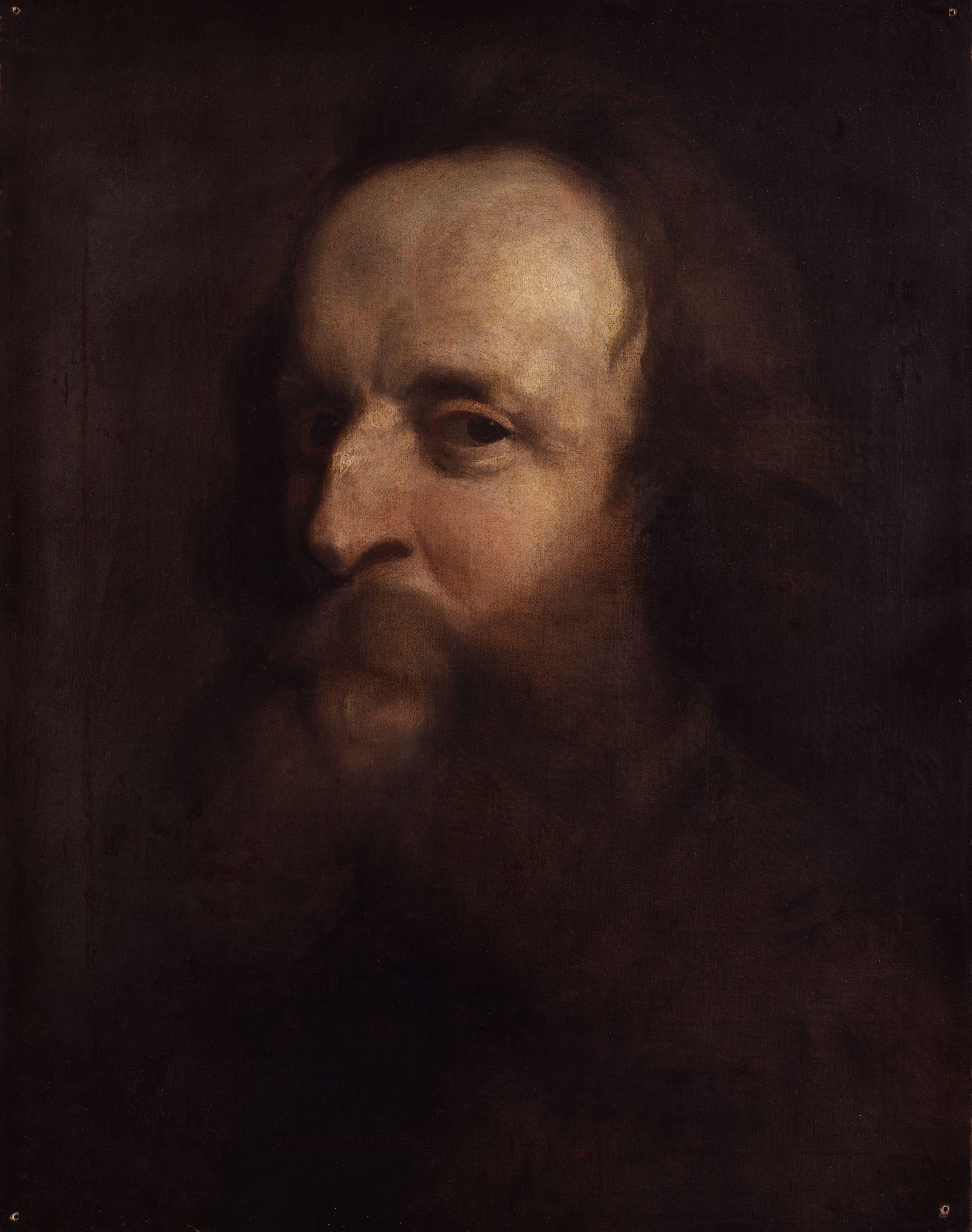
Abraham Simon self-portrait c 1670

Abraham Simon (1617-?1692) was an English medallist in the 17th century who worked closely with his brother Thomas Simon.

== Biography ==
Simon was born in London in 1617. He worked abroad in Sweden and Holland before returning in 1643. His brother, Thomas, was made Engraver of Coin in 1645. Simon's self-portrait is in the National Portrait Gallery (London), and shows the skills that he brought to the wax models he created. His brother's sketchbook is in the Victoria and Albert Museum. A portrait of him as St. Jerome was painted by Heinrich Dittmers in 1665. Simon is thought to have died around 1692.
