= Martin Lerner =

Martin Lerner (born 1936) is an American art historian and curator best known for his long tenure as the Curator of Indian and Southeast Asian Art at the Metropolitan Museum of Art (MET) in New York City, a position he held from 1972 until his retirement in 2003. Over the course of his career, Lerner significantly contributed to the study, preservation, and display of Asian art, particularly focusing on the art of India and Southeast Asia. However, his legacy has been clouded by his involvement in the controversy surrounding Cambodian looted art and his association with notorious art dealer Douglas Latchford.

== Early life and education ==
Martin Lerner (born 1936) is an American art historian specializing in South and Southeast Asian art. He taught art history at the University of California, Santa Barbara (1965–1966) and served as assistant curator of Oriental art at the Cleveland Museum of Art (1966–1972), while also teaching at Case Western Reserve University. In 1972, he joined the Metropolitan Museum of Art in New York, where he served in several curatorial roles, including curator of South and Southeast Asian art from 1978 until his retirement.

== Career at the Metropolitan Museum of Art ==
Lerner joined the Metropolitan Museum of Art in 1972 specializing in Indian and Southeast Asian art. His later association with art dealer Douglas Latchford, however, drew controversy and affected his professional reputation.

== Impact on the Metropolitan Museum of Art's Collection ==
Lerner expanded the Metropolitan's collection, acquiring works from Cambodia, Thailand, India, and Vietnam and established a dedicated gallery for Khmer art. Lerner worked with Douglas A. J. Latchford, a British-Thai businessman and collector who would later be indicted for trafficking looted Cambodian artifacts Latchford had a significant role in building the MET’s collection during the 1980s and 1990s. Starting in 1983, Latchford either donated or sold 13 key objects to the museum, many of which became highlights of the museum's collection of Khmer art. Among these were two large torsos of stone statues, the Kneeling Attendants, which were displayed at the entrance of the museum's Khmer gallery. Latchford donated these statues to the Metropolitan "in honor of Martin Lerner".

== Controversy and Involvement with Douglas Latchford ==
In the 2000s and 2010s, Lerner was accused of trafficking looted artifacts, many of which were sold to prominent museums, including the MET. According to a report by The New York Times dated August 18, 2022, documents retrieved from Latchford’s computer, which was handed over to the Cambodian government by Latchford’s daughter after his death, "show that Lerner used his expertise and reputation as a former Met expert to help Latchford market items for sale. In letters drawn up for Latchford clients, Lerner vouched for the value and significance of artifacts, in one case using language that closely tracked with what Latchford had asked him to write. They also owned at least one artifact together."

== Legacy ==
Martin Lerner’s career remains a subject of debate within the art world. While his contributions to the study and preservation of Indian and Southeast Asian art are significant, his involvement in the Cambodian art trafficking controversy has had a lasting impact on his legacy. The case surrounding Latchford’s illicit trade has prompted renewed scrutiny of museum practices, particularly regarding the acquisition of Asian antiquities in the latter half of the 20th century.
