= Esunertos =

British Iron Age King

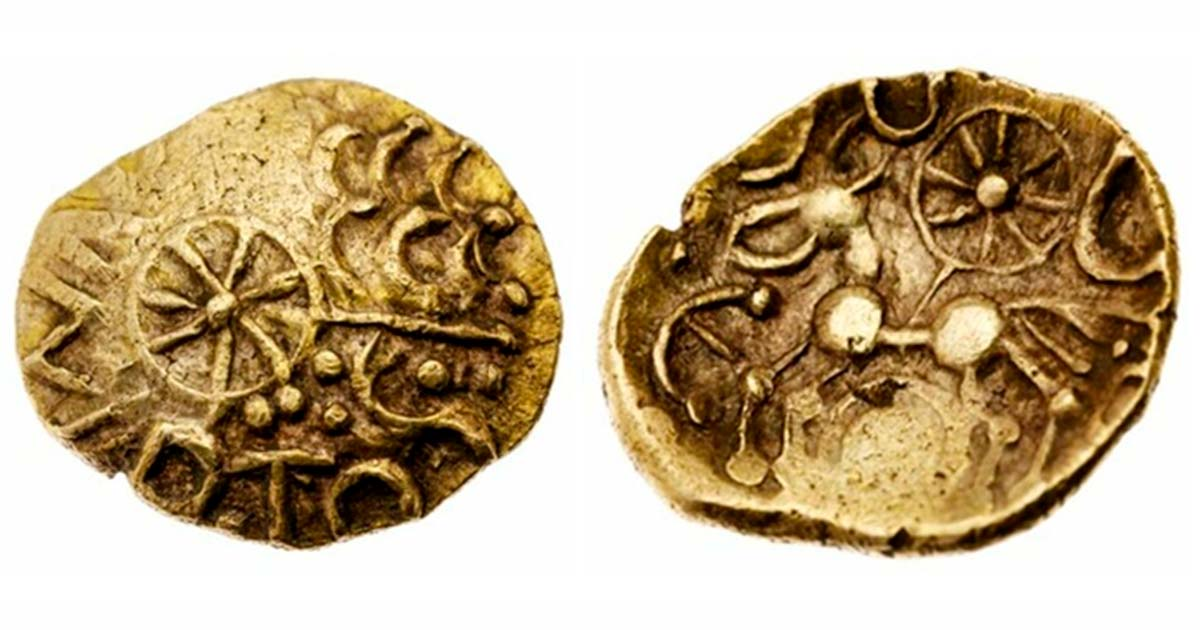
Gold coin associated with Esunertos

Esunertos, or Iisuniirtos (fl. 50-30 BC), was a male ruler in Britain in the western Thames basin in the second half of the 1st century BC. He is known only from a few rare gold and silver coins, which provide the full spelling of his name – IISVNIIRTOS (II being a form of E favoured by early scribes in Britain at this time). This is also the first time that the Celtic nominative form -os- has been observed.

== Etymology ==
The name Esunertos has no parallel in contemporary histories for Britain, but is a recorded masculine name from the Roman period of occupation in Gaul. The name has been interpreted as 'mighty as Esos', a contemporary Celtic god. (Note: The theophoric name is also attested in Continental Europe, interpreted to mean 'having the power of Esus'.) It is not clear whether Esunertos was a friend or even usurper of Commius (or Commios). Nevertheless, alongside Commios, his is the earliest attested name on a British-made Iron Age coin.

== Dating ==
Stylistically, the coinage is similar to Commios, ruler of the Atrebates. After Julius Caesar's invasion of Britain in 55 and 54 BC, he was made a client king at Silchester. Commios is known to have struck coins in his own name from 30 BC. The three known coins of Esunertos centre around Danebury Hill Fort, placing his territory around this prehistoric site towards the end of the Iron Age period.

== Evidence ==
In March 2023, Lewis Fudge, a metal detectorist unearthed a gold quarter stater coin in a field in the Test Valley of Hampshire. It was reported to numismatic experts at the Portable Antiquities Scheme and the Celtic Coin Index at the Ashmolean Museum. The reading was confirmed as [IIS]VNIRTOS, providing a new inscription in the British numismatic record. Prior to the Test Valley discovery, other coins had been incorrectly identified as unsigned issues of the Belgae tribe.

In September 2023, Spink confirmed that a coin of Esunertos would be sold at auction.

On 28 September 2023, Spink announced that this same coin had sold for £17,000 (including Buyer's Premium), setting a record for any Quarter-Stater ever sold at auction.
