= Emma Bunker =

American art historian (1930–2021)

Emma C. Bunker
- Born: June 19, 1930; Haverford, Pennsylvania, U.S.
- Died: February 21, 2021 (aged 90); Denver, Colorado, U.S.
- Board member of: Denver Art Museum (trustee)
- Spouse: John Bunker (m. 1956; died 2005)
- Children: 5
- Relatives: Ellsworth Bunker (father-in-law)

Academic background
- Education: Bryn Mawr College (BA); New York University Institute of Fine Arts (MA)

Academic work
- Discipline: Art history
- Sub-discipline: Chinese, Eurasian steppe and Southeast Asian art

Emma Cadwalader Bunker (June 19, 1930 – February 21, 2021) was an American art historian, collector and museum trustee. A specialist in the art of China, the Eurasian Steppe and Southeast Asia, she published more than 50 works and was associated for decades with the Denver Art Museum as a consultant, volunteer and trustee. Along with her husband, she donated more than 200 objects to its collection.

Together with Douglas Latchford, Bunker co-wrote three books on Khmer art and lent scholarly support to his sales of Southeast Asian antiquities. After her death, a 2022 investigation by The Denver Post identified her as "The Scholar", an unnamed figure in a US government forfeiture complaint. She was said to have vouched for false provenances of looted Cambodian objects. The Denver Art Museum subsequently removed her name from its Asian art galleries, returned $185,000 that she and her family had donated, and announced the repatriation of 11 antiquities that had come to it from her.

== Early life and education ==
Bunker was born June 19, 1930, in Haverford, Pennsylvania. She earned a B.A. from Bryn Mawr College and studied at New York University’s Institute of Fine Arts, earning an M.A. in the field of Asian art.

== Art historian and museum trustee ==
Bunker was associated for decades with the Denver Art Museum as a consultant, volunteer and trustee, and was considered an expert in Asian art. She was a leading authority on personal adornment in China and the art of the nomadic peoples of the Eurasian Steppe. She published more than 50 works on Chinese, Eurasian and Southeast Asian art. She taught Asian art and introductory art history as a visiting professor at Colorado College across three decades. In the 1980s, she helped launch the Connoisseurs' Council of the Asian Art Museum of San Francisco. In 2018 a book of essays was published in her honor.

Bunker and her husband were collectors and benefactors of the Denver Art Museum. Over the years, they donated 221 pieces to its European, American, Latin American and Asian collections, and from 1963 they also gave money to the museum.

Bunker also advised auction houses in the sale of Asian art. For Sotheby's she wrote a catalog entry and gave a lecture for the planned sale of a looted tenth-century statue of Duryodhana from Koh Ker that had passed through Douglas Latchford's hands. In 2012 the US government accused Sotheby's of deceit over the sale, and in 2013 the auction house returned the statue to Cambodia.

== Looted art revelations ==
In 2022 a series of investigative reports by the Denver Post explored Bunker's role in trafficking looted art. The series identified her as "The Scholar", an unnamed figure in a November 2021 US government forfeiture complaint over four looted Cambodian statues held by the Denver Art Museum. She was said to have vouched for false provenances of objects Latchford was selling. The museum subsequently returned the statues to Cambodia. She had also been named in earlier federal cases to recover stolen objects, from Sotheby's in 2012 and the dealer Nancy Wiener in 2011. According to The Art Newspaper, in the Wiener case she had supplied a false provenance for a stolen bronze Buddha that Latchford sold to Wiener for $500,000. The Denver Art Museum issued a statement saying it was troubled by the revelations.

Together with Douglas Latchford, Bunker co-wrote three books on Cambodian art that experts say "were filled with false provenances". In 2023, two years after her death, the Denver Art Museum cut its ties with Bunker, removing her name from its Arts of Asia gallery and returning $185,000 that she and her family had donated under a 2018 naming agreement. Later that year, officials from Cambodia, Thailand and Vietnam asked the museum to return eight allegedly looted antiquities, six of which Bunker had donated. In March 2024 the museum announced that it would repatriate 11 Southeast Asian antiquities to Cambodia, Thailand and Vietnam, all of which had come to it from Bunker.

== Personal life and death ==
In 1956, Bunker married John Bunker, an executive of Holly Sugar Corporation in Colorado Springs and son of the diplomat Ellsworth Bunker. The couple moved to Denver in 1962. They had five children. The Bunkers lived on a ranch in Wyoming and kept an apartment in Denver. John Bunker died in 2005. Emma Bunker died at her home in Denver on February 21, 2021, at the age of 90.

== Selected works ==
- Bunker, Emma C. (1997). Ancient Bronzes of the Eastern Eurasian Steppes from the Arthur M. Sackler Collections. New York: Arthur M. Sackler Foundation; distributed by Harry N. Abrams. ISBN 978-0-8109-6348-1. OCLC 37832728.
- Bunker, Emma C. (2002). Nomadic Art of the Eastern Eurasian Steppes: The Eugene V. Thaw and Other New York Collections. With contributions by James C. Y. Watt and Zhixin Sun. New York; New Haven: Metropolitan Museum of Art; Yale University Press. ISBN 978-1-58839-066-0. OCLC 50091634.
- Bunker, Emma C.; Latchford, Douglas (2004). Adoration and Glory: The Golden Age of Khmer Art. Chicago: Art Media Resources. ISBN 978-1-58886-070-5. OCLC 53076211.
- Bunker, Emma C.; Latchford, Douglas (2008). Khmer Gold: Gifts for the Gods. Chicago: Douglas A. J. Latchford; Art Media Resources. OCLC 174500435.
- Bunker, Emma C.; Latchford, Douglas (2011). Khmer Bronzes: New Interpretations of the Past. Chicago: Art Media Resources. OCLC 723142822.
