= Nancy Wiener =

American antiquities dealer

Nancy Wiener is an antiquities dealer who pleaded guilty to charges of conspiracy and possession of stolen property.

== Art dealing ==
Daughter of art dealer Doris Wiener (d. April 6, 2011), Nancy Wiener also worked as an art dealer in New York.

A joint federal and state investigation into antiquities trafficking known as "Hidden Idol" resulted in the criminal lawsuit People of the State of New York v. Nancy Wiener, No. SCI-05191-2016 (N.Y. Crim. Ct. filed Dec. 21, 2016).

Wiener was arrested in Manhattan December 2016 and charged with conspiring with international smuggling and trafficking looted objects. Her gallery sold art to clients including the Metropolitan Museum of Art, Los Angeles County Museum, Art Institute of Chicago and National Gallery of Australia.

== False provenance for looted art ==
Wiener acknowledged in court that she used fake provenances to conceal the true origins of the looted objects. She was ordered to pay $1.2 million in forfeitures and fines.

== Restitutions to India and other countries ==
Numerous antiquities that passed through Doris and Nancy Wiener have been restituted to India following criminal investigations. Cultural heritage artworks looted from Cambodia and Myanmar have also been investigated and in some cases returned.

== See also ==
- Denver Art Museum
- Subhash Kapoor
- Douglas Latchford
