= Thomas Simon =

English medallist

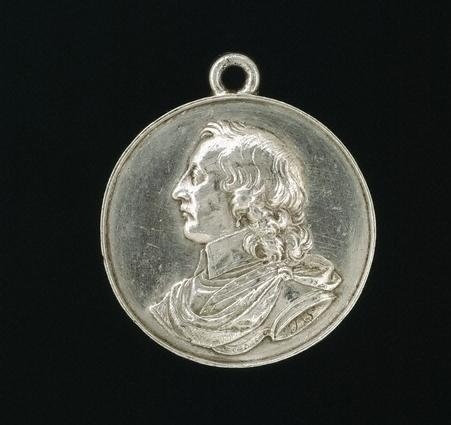
Medal, 1653, Thomas Simon V&A Museum no. 815-1904

Thomas Simon (c. 1623 – 1665), English medalist, was born, according to George Vertue, in Yorkshire about 1623.

Simon studied engraving under Nicholas Briot, and about 1635 received a post in connection with the Royal Mint. In 1645, he was appointed by the parliament joint chief engraver along with Edward Wade, and, having executed the great seal of the Commonwealth and dies for the coinage, he was promoted to be chief engraver to the Royal Mint and seals. He produced several fine portrait medals of Oliver Cromwell, one of which is copied from a miniature by Samuel Cooper.

After the Restoration Simon was appointed engraver of the king's seals. On the occasion of his contest with the brothers John, Joseph and Philip Roettiers, who were employed by the mint in 1662, Simon produced his celebrated crown of Charles II, on the margin of which he engraved a petition to the king. This is usually considered his masterpiece. He is believed to have died of the plague in London in 1665.

A volume of The Medals, Coins, Great Seals and other Works of Thomas Simon, engraved and described by George Vertue, was published in 1753. He worked together with his brother Abraham Simon.
