= Douglas Latchford =

British art dealer (1931–2020)

Douglas Arthur Joseph "Dynamite" Latchford (15 October 1931 – 2 August 2020) was a British art dealer, smuggler and author. He was known for being a prominent collector and trader of Cambodian statues and artefacts, which he illegally smuggled out of the country during the civil war and Khmer Rouge eras, and sold to prominent museums and art collectors. He was charged with fraud in 2019 for falsifying the origins of traded antiquities. Since his death in 2020, millions of dollars' worth of artefacts smuggled by Latchford have been repatriated to Cambodia.

== Biography ==
Latchford was born on 15 October 1931 in Mumbai, India, which was at the time under the British Raj. He was educated at Brighton College in England before returning to India shortly before Independence.

Latchford initially worked in the pharmaceutical industry in Mumbai. He moved to Bangkok in 1956, and in 1963 established a drug distribution company. Latchford also invested profitably in Thailand land development and became a Thai citizen in 1968. He was briefly married to a Thai woman and took a Thai name, Pakpong Kriangsak.

A long-time devotee of the sport of bodybuilding, Latchford became a patron of the sport in Thailand and was the honorary president of the Thai Bodybuilding Association from 2016 until his death.

== Antiquities trade ==
A controversial figure, Latchford was best known as a collector of Cambodian antiquities. According to his obituary in The New York Times, Latchford was "a cultured accumulator of museum-quality Khmer sculptures and jewels", whilst The Diplomat reported that, due to his leading position in the illegal antiquities trade of the Khmer Rouge, "no single figure looms as large over a nation’s wholesale pillage." Nonetheless, the Cambodian government awarded Latchford a Grand Cross of the Royal Order of Monisaraphon in 2008. He co-authored three books on Khmer antiquities with academic Emma Bunker.

In the 1970s, Latchford became one of the leading suppliers of Cambodian art, selling to museums and private collections in Europe and North America, including the Metropolitan Museum of Art in New York. He kept the best pieces for himself and his personal collection is rumored to rival that of the National Museum of Cambodia. When his daughter inherited the collection and donated it in full to Cambodia, it contained 125 pieces and was valued at $50 million.

== Indictment for trafficking ==
In 2019 Latchford was indicted for wire fraud and other crimes related to antiquities trafficking. He died in 2020.

In October 2021, a large investigation by media from the UK, US, and Australia, working with the ICIJ, explored the prevalence of artworks that Latchford had traded to public museums and galleries. The media consortium focused on the books published by Latchford, sale records, museum records, and corporate documents from trust structures established by Latchford for inheritance purposes to identify 27 pieces linked to Latchford in prominent collections. It highlighted at least a dozen works of art linked to Latchford held by the Metropolitan Museum of Art, and another fifteen relics among the Denver Art Museum, the British Museum, Cleveland Museum of Art, and the National Gallery of Australia.

In June 2023 Latchford's estate settled a civil forfeiture action with the Department of Homeland Security for $12 million.

In December 2023, following additional investigations, the Metropolitan Museum agreed to return another 13 Cambodian antiquities that Latchford had trafficked.

Donations and sales by collectors and dealers associated with Latchford were identified at the Brooklyn Museum, Asian Art Museum, National Gallery of Australia, and Art Gallery of NSW. The National Gallery of Australia claimed that a piece tied to Latchford was the subject of a live investigation, whilst the Los Angeles County Museum of Art refused to engage with the journalists.

A private collector will forfeit a collection of artifacts bought for over $35 million.

== Repatriation of collection ==
Two years before Latchford's death, his daughter Nawapan Kriangsak had initiated discussions to return the whole collection, valued at over $50 million, to be exhibited at the National Museum of Cambodia as the Latchford Collection. The transfer of ownership was completed on 18 September 2020: however, progress in returning the collection stalled following the release of the Pandora Papers, which revealed that the family had attempted to avoid paying UK Inheritance Tax.

In November 2021, after rising pressure from the United States federal government, the Denver Art Museum agreed to voluntarily repatriate four Cambodian antiquities in their possession, which included three Khmer sandstone sculptures dating back to the 7th and 12th centuries, respectively, and an Iron Age Dong Son bronze bell.

In August 2023, the National Gallery of Australia said it would return three statues to Cambodia which had been bought from Latchford in 2011. The gallery paid US$1.5 million for the bronze statues of Avalokiteshvara Padmapani and attendants which were dug up by looters in 1994. Latchford insisted on a non-disclosure agreement before handing over provenance information. Also in 2023 Latchford's daughter agreed in forfeiting $12 million and returning 125 statues and other stolen relics to Cambodia.

In January 2026, the Asian Art Museum of San Francisco returned four large Prakhon Chai sculptures to Thailand. Originally smuggled by Latchford out of the country, they are now housed at the National Museum Bangkok.

== Selected works ==
- Adoration and Glory: The Golden Age of Khmer Art (2003) ISBN 978-1588860705
- Khmer Gold Gifts for the Gods (2008) ISBN 978-1588860972
- Khmer Bronzes: New Interpretations of the Past (2011) ISBN 978-1588861115

== See also ==
- Nancy Wiener
- Martin Lerner
- Money laundering
