= Petition Crown =

- England
- Value: Crown
- Mass: 33 g
- Diameter: 40 mm
- Composition: Silver
- Years of minting: 1663

Obverse
- Design: King Charles II
- Designer: Thomas Simon

Reverse
- Designer: Thomas Simon

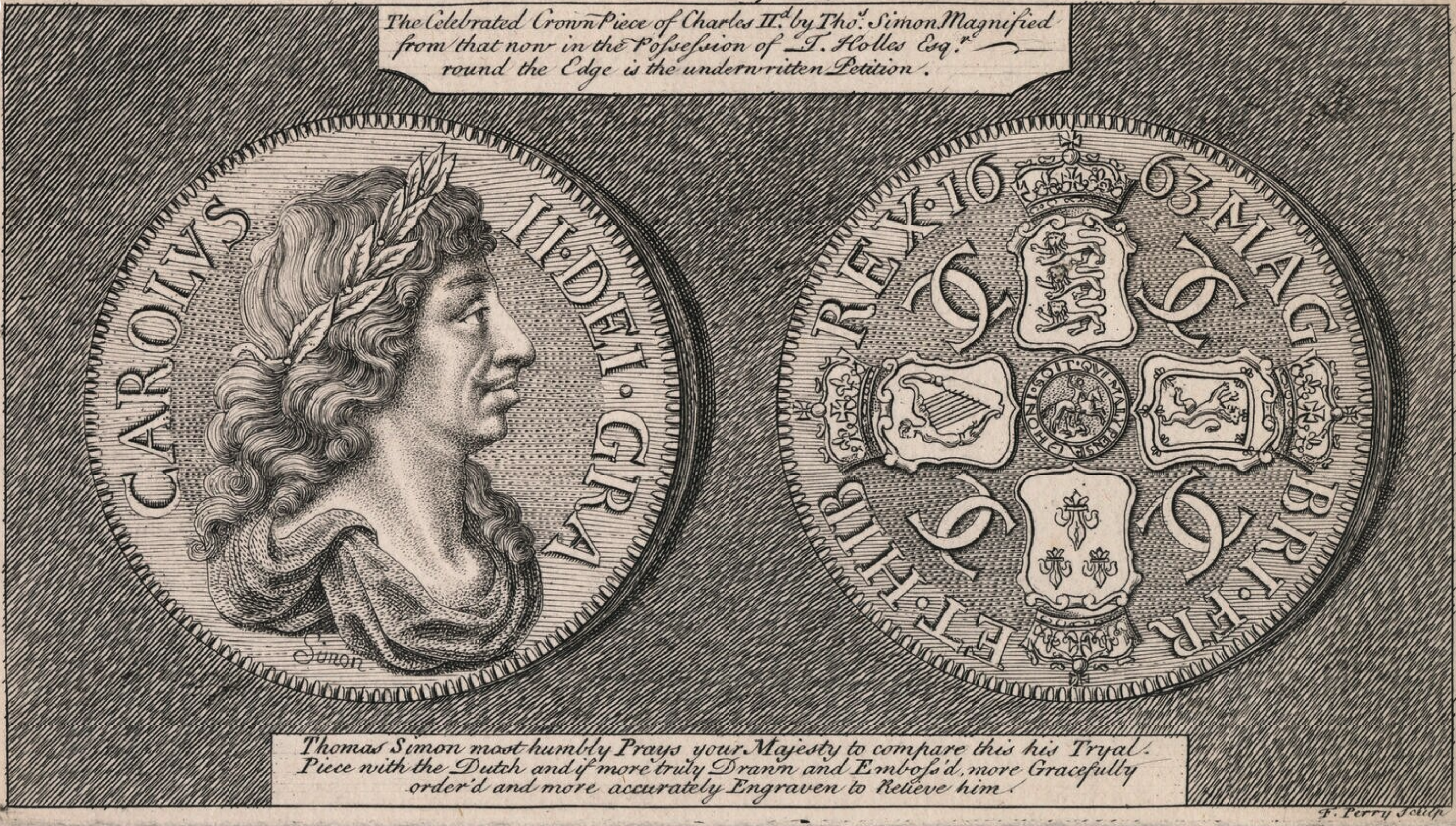

The Petition Crown was a pattern coin produced in 1663 by Thomas Simon, a celebrated English medallist and coin-designer. The coin was submitted directly by the artist to King Charles II as a personal 'petition' against the contemporary coins designed by the Flemish brothers John and Joseph Roettiers, and for the further Royal consideration that only Simon's designs be used for all future specie now that machine-made currency had been adopted universally for the production of British coinage.

The rivalry between the Roettiers brothers and Thomas Simon resulted from a Royal competition to design this new milled coinage. For unclear reasons, Simon did not submit his trial design in time, resulting in the Flemish engravers winning by default and their coinage being issued for circulation in 1662. However Simon's desire to win back the King's affections resulted in the development of this trial piece the following year. Not only did it dramatically differ from the coins produced by the Roettiers brothers, but it also bore his 'petition' engraved in 200 letters in two lines around the coin's rim:

THOMAS SIMON MOST HVMBLY PRAYS YOVR MAJESTY TO COMPARE THIS HIS TRYALL PIECE WITH THE DVTCH AND IF MORE TRVLY DRAWN & EMBOSS'D MORE GRACE; FVLLY ORDER'D AND MORE ACCURATELY ENGRAVEN TO RELEIVE HIM. [sic]

The adoption of edge lettering on British coinage began under Oliver Cromwell, when Thomas Simon was engraver of dies at the Royal Mint and where he also produced the State Seal of the Commonwealth. The markings were intended to guard against the contemporary practice of clipping or the shaving of precious metal off the edges of a coin for illicit personal gain. At the time of production, Charles II's coinage bore the Latin phrase DECVS ET TVTAMEN ['An Ornament and a Safeguard'] in relation to this practice. This phrase was still being used on British coins until the revision of the pound coin in 2015.

Simon's coin shows the bust of King Charles II draped in his flowing hair and laurel leaves, with his celebrated lovelock over his right shoulder. The intricacy of the engraving portrays even the shadows of the King's veins on his neck. The inscription reads CAROLVS II. DEI. GRA and on the reverse are crowned cruciform shields of England, Scotland, Ireland and France, with the order of the Garter at the centre. There are two C's interlinked in each angle. The reverse of the coin is slightly convex and the obverse is concave to show the King as a stronger feature of the coin. Ultimately however the Roettier brothers continued to produce the dies for the crowns, albeit from 1664 with subtle corrections as a result of the influence of Simon's pattern.

The earliest known sale of Simon's revered pattern coin occurred in 1742 at the sale of the Earl of Oxford, wherein it fetched the princely sum of £20 (approximately £2,300 in 2017). Whilst the market price for examples has fluctuated dramatically over the centuries, from as little as £6.6.0 in 1795 to £500 in 1889, its spectacular artistry and noted rarity have gained it a passionate following amongst numismatists. Today the coin is known from only a handful of examples and is extremely sought after. Consequently copies of the coin known as electrotypes have been made for collectors who were otherwise unable to afford the artist's original.

In 2007, an original example sold for £207,100 [approx. $420,000]. More recently, an example was sold in New York in 2018 for a reported $649,000.

In 2023 the UK's Royal Mint released a range of modern commemorative coinage, inspired by the 1663 'petition' crown, celebrating 360 years since the original pattern coin was struck.

In January 2024, an NGC MS 62 graded example was sold for $960,000 (based on a hammer for $800,000 plus the buyer`s 20 percent premium of $160,000), and in May 2024, an example of higher graded NGC MS 63+ was sold for CHF 775,000 plus CHF 174,375 buyers premium and taxes (in total $1.04 million) setting a new world record price for a British silver crown.

== Reddite Crown ==
Simon's dies were also used to strike the similar 'Reddite' Crown, which differs from the Petition Crown only on the basis of the edge lettering:

REDDITE QUÆ CÆSARIS CÆSARI

On 27 March 2014, an example sold in London for £396,000 [$657,000], setting a current world record for any British silver coin.
