= Chief Engraver of the Royal Mint =

Senior position at the British Royal Mint

Chief Engraver of the Royal Mint is a senior position at the British Royal Mint who is responsible for overseeing the preparation of coin dies.

== List of chief engravers ==
Period	Chief Engraver	Notes	Ref.
1060s?	Theobald of Lisson Green	Cutter of the Dies of All England	
1090s–1100s	Otto the Goldsmith	Officer of the Dies	
1100s–?	Otto FitzOtto		
?–1160s	William FitzOtto		
1160s–1194	Otto FitzWilliam		
1194–1214	William FitzOtto		
1214–1257	Otto FitzWilliam		
1257–1265	William FitzOtto		
1265–1274	Thomas FitzOtto	Serjeant of the Dies	
1274–1282	Otto FitzOtto	Serjeant of the Dies	
1282–1283	Guy Ferre	Serjeant of the Dies	
1285–1324	John de Botetourt, 1st Baron Botetourt	Serjeant of the Dies	
1324–1335	William Latimer, 3rd Baron Latimer	Serjeant of the Dies	
1335–1379	William Latimer, 4th Baron Latimer	Serjeant of the Dies	
1379–1386	William Geyton	Engraver of the Tower Mint	
1386–1388	William Pevere	Engraver of the Tower Mint	
1388–?	John Edmund	Engraver of the Tower Mint	
1421–1431	Gilbert of Brandenburg	Engraver of the Tower Mint	
1431–1445	John Orwell	Engraver of the Tower Mint	
1445–1452	Thomas Wythiale	Engraver of the Tower Mint	
1452–1462	William Wodewarde	Engraver of the Tower Mint	
1462–1483	Edmund Shaa	Engraver of the Tower Mint	
1483–1485	John Shaa	Engraver of the Tower Mint	
1485–1492	Nicholas Flynt	Engraver of the Tower Mint	
1494–1509	Alexander Bruchsal	Engraver of the Tower Mint	
1510–1519	John Sharp	Engraver of the Tower Mint	
1519–1536	Henry Norris	Engraver of the Tower Mint	
1536–1544	Thomas Wriothesely	Engraver of the Tower Mint	
1544–1550	Henry Bayse		
1550–1551	Robert Pitt		
1552–1596	Derek Anthony		
1596–1615	Charles Anthony		
1615–1618	Thomas Anthony		
1618–1624	William Holle		
1625–1628	John Gilbert and Edward Green	Joint positions	
1628–1644	Edward Green		
1645–1648	Thomas Simon and Edward Wade	Joint positions	
1645–1649	Thomas Rawlins	Appointed by King Charles I	
1649–1660	Thomas Simon		
1660–1670	Thomas Rawlins		
1670–1689	John Roettiers		
1689–1690	George Bower		
1690–1704	Henry Harris		
1705–1741	John Croker		
1741–1773	John Sigismund Tanner		
1773–1779	Richard Yeo		
1779–1815	Lewis Pingo		
1815–1817	Thomas Wyon		
1817–1821	Post vacant		
1821–1828	Benedetto Pistrucci	Subsequently, became Chief Medallist at the mint	
1828–1851	William Wyon	Leonard Charles Wyon appointed Second Engraver at the mint in 1843.	
1851–1891	Leonard Charles Wyon	Modeler and Engraver of the Royal Mint	
1892–1903	George William de Saulles	Engraver of the Royal Mint	
as of 1960	Walter Newman		
1970s	Eric Sewell		
1979–1998	Hubert Theodore Elsasser		
1998-2004	Marcel Canioni		
2004–2011	Matthew Bonnacorsi		
2011–present	Gordon Summers		

== Bibliography ==
- Challis, C. E. (1992). A New History of the Royal Mint. Cambridge University Press. ISBN 978-0521240260.
- Whetmore, S. A. H. (1960). Some Further Notes On Thomas Simon (PDF). British Numismatic Society.
