= Fourpence (British coin) =

Former coin of the United Kingdom and other territories

Four pence
- United Kingdom
- Value: 4d (equivalent to ~1.67 new pence)
- Mass: 1.9 g
- Diameter: 16 mm
- Thickness: 1 mm
- Edge: Milled
- Composition: 92.5% Ag

Obverse
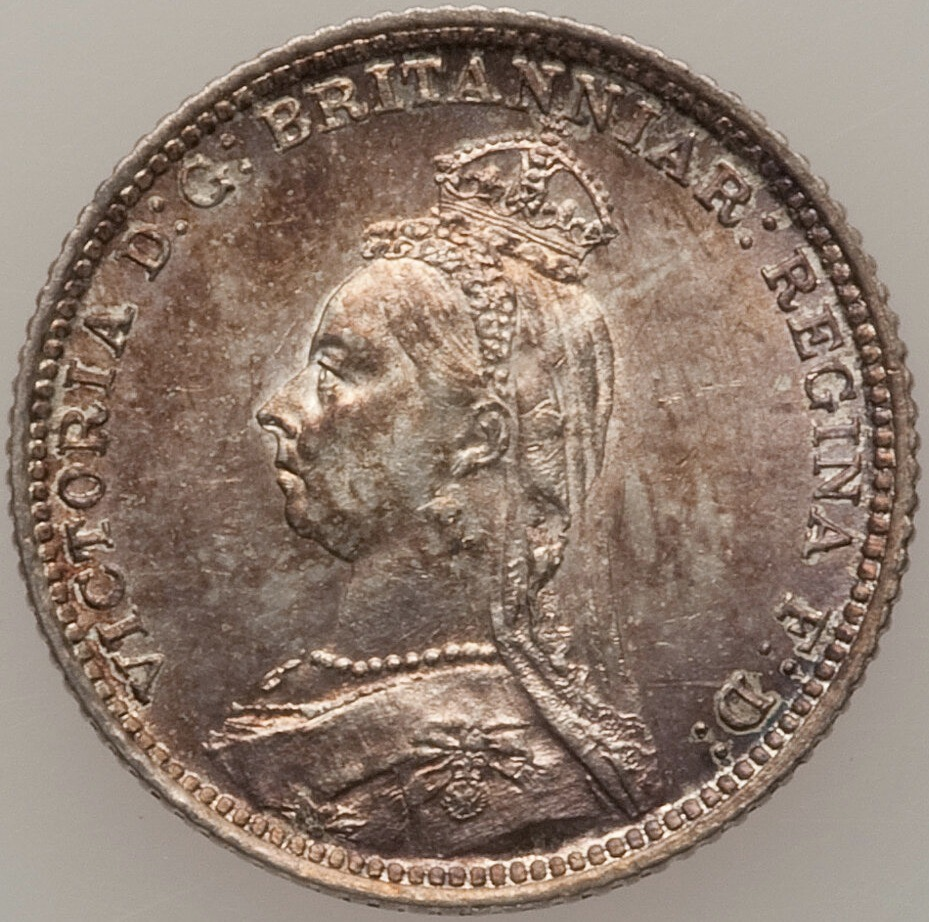
- Design: Profile of the monarch (Victoria design shown)
- Designer: Joseph Boehm
- Design date: 1888 (first used on British coinage in 1887)

Reverse
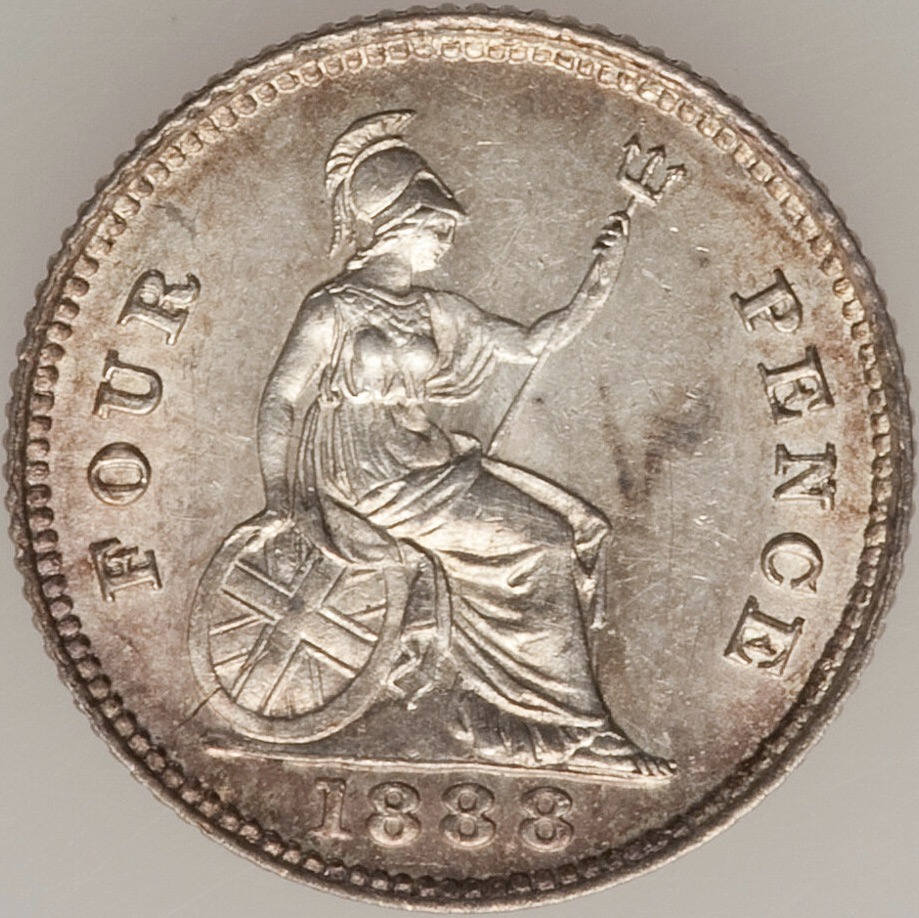
- Design: Britannia
- Designer: William Wyon
- Design date: 1836

The British fourpence piece, often known as a groat, "joey" or fourpenny bit, is a British sterling silver coin worth four old pence: 1/60 of one pound or 1/3 of one shilling. This is the equivalent of around 1.7 new pence. It is a continuation of the English groat series struck intermittently from the late 13th century until the Acts of Union in 1707.

The British groat was struck throughout the 18th century, though by 1800 it had come mostly to be coined to be given as ceremonial alms at the Royal Maundy service. It was resurrected as a circulating coin in 1836, as the Royal Mint sought to fill the gap between the penny and sixpence. The fourpence was chosen at the urging of the politician Joseph Hume, who noted that fourpence was the cab fare for short journeys. The new coin did not endear him to hackney drivers, who previously often received sixpence without a request for change, and they gave it the nickname "joey". There was also confusion between the groat and the sixpence.

In 1845, the Royal Mint began to strike the threepenny bit for circulation in Britain. The same diameter as the groat, though thinner, the threepence proved more popular, and the last groats intended for circulation in Britain were dated 1855. A final issue of fourpences, intended for use in British Guiana, was dated 1888.

== Origins of the groat ==
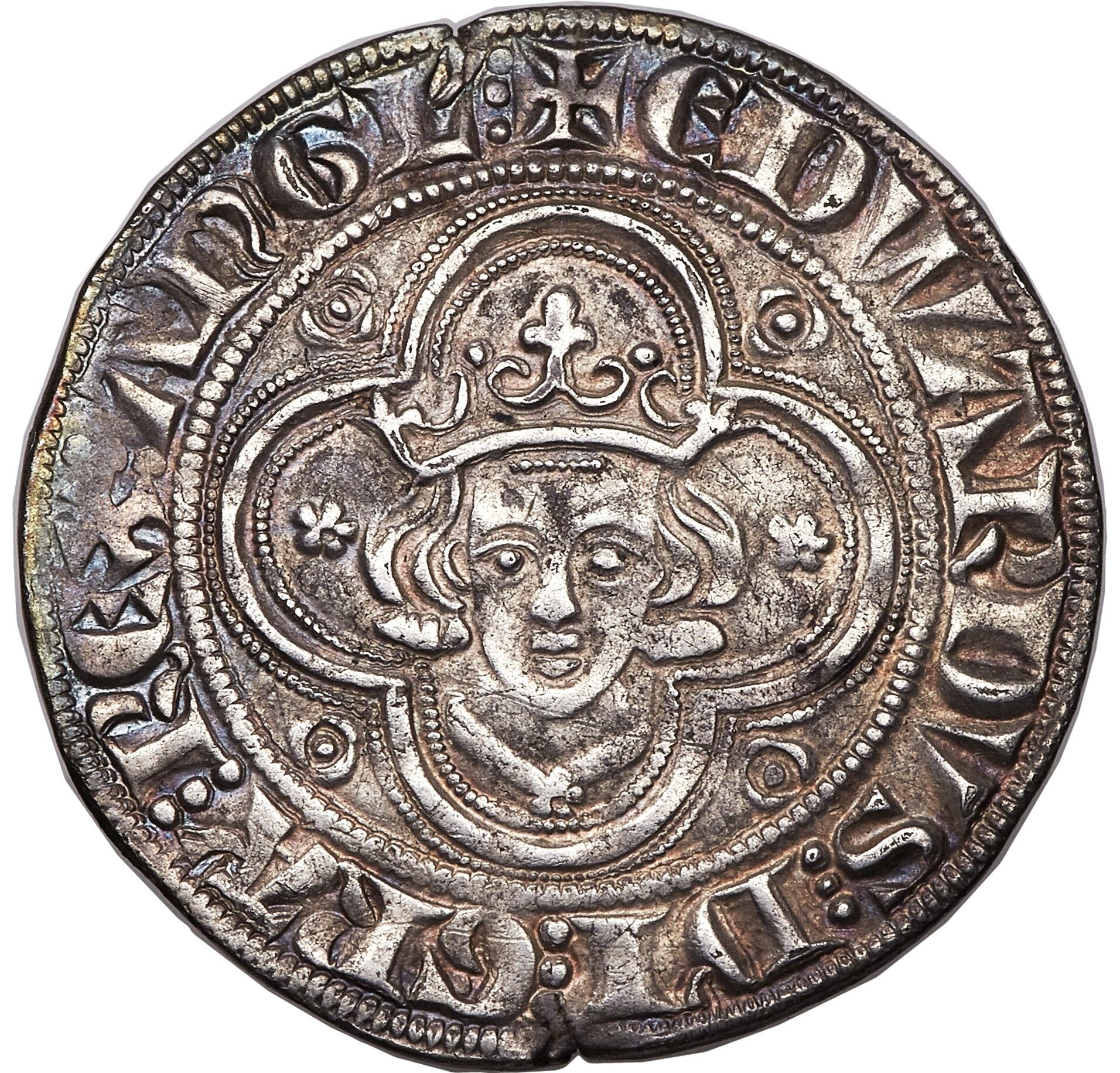
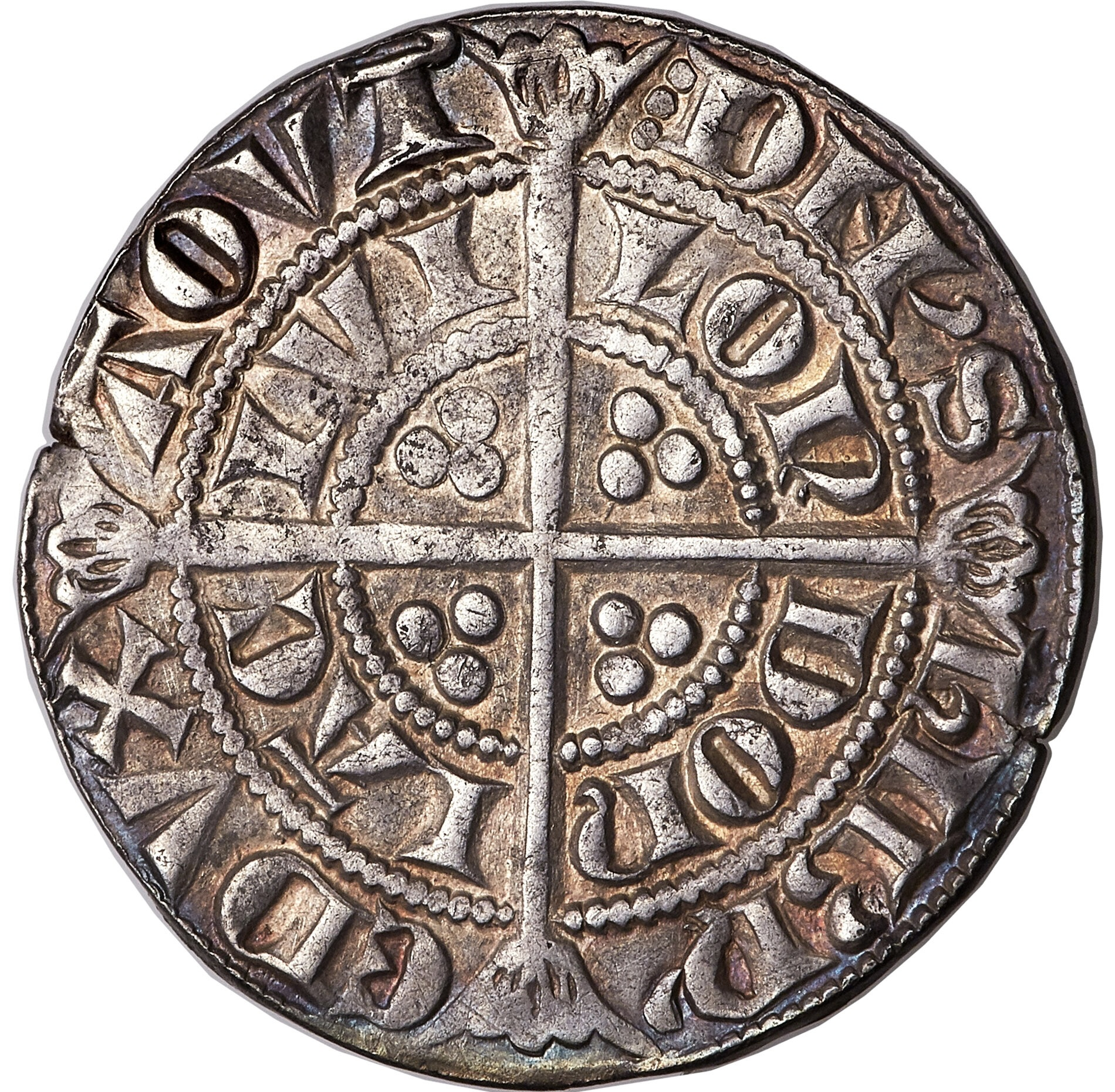
Edward I groat

The fourpence, or groat (from the French gros or Italian grosso, meaning great or thick) was first struck about 1279 by Edward I (r. 1272–1307) as part of his currency reforms, as a larger silver coin that could be used in foreign trade. Whilst it proved unpopular as merchants preferred payment in silver pennies (the groat weighed less than four of the smaller coins), it was successfully reintroduced by Edward III (r. 1327–1377) and was struck by most monarchs thereafter until Queen Victoria (r. 1837–1901).

Beginning with the restoration of Charles II (r. 1660–1685) in 1660, English coins, including the groat, were generally struck by machine. Because all groats dated 1689 or after bore a crowned numeral 4 similar to that still used on Maundy fourpence, these groats are often referred to as Maundy pieces, or sold in sets of four with the silver penny, twopence and threepence of that year. This is done even though the groat was not used as part of the Royal Maundy charity distributions until the reign of George III (r. 1760–1820). Before that, only the silver penny and the occasional twopence were used.

== Post-unification ==
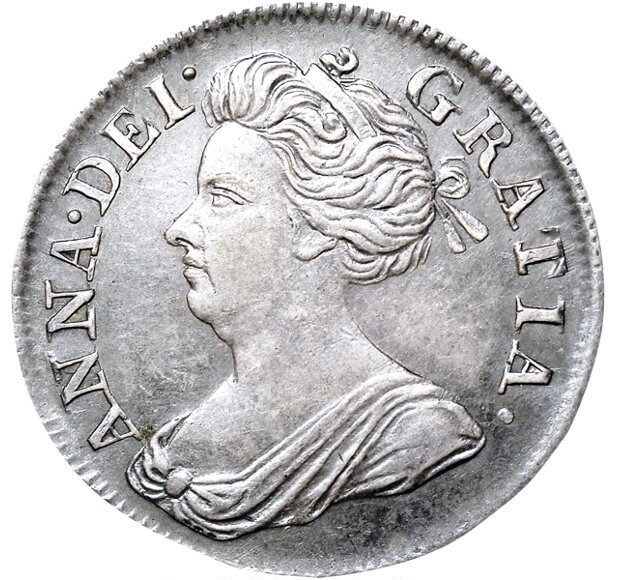
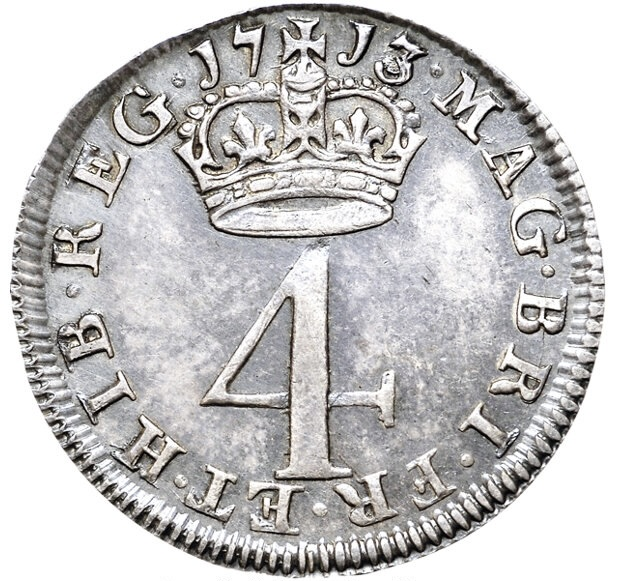
1713 groat for Queen Anne

The Acts of Union 1707 united the realms of England and Scotland into a single nation. According to Peter Seaby in his history of British coins, "the coinage can be divided into pre-Union and post-Union issues". The Kingdom of Great Britain, because of provisions of the Acts of Union, was to use coins of English type throughout the realm, and its first groats were struck in 1708, continuing the series of English coins depicting Queen Anne (r. 1702–1714) which had begun in 1703. They were designed by either John Croker or his assistant Samuel Bull, and depicted a left-facing bust of Anne on the obverse with the inscription ANNA DEI GRATIA (Anne by the grace of God ...) and on the reverse a crowned numeral 4, the date, and the inscription MAG BR FR ET HIB REG (short for "... Queen of Great Britain, France and Ireland"). The groat was struck again in 1709, and then with a larger 4 in 1710 and 1713.

Croker or Bull, or the two together, designed the groat for George I (r. 1714–1727), though Johann Rudolph Ochs, senior, may have designed the reverse. These were struck dated 1717, 1721, 1723 and 1727 with the obverse bearing a head of King George facing right with the inscription GEORGIUS DEI GRA (short for "George by the Grace of God" ...). The reverse depicted the crowned 4 with the date and the inscription MAG BRI FR ET HIB REX (short for "... King of Great Britain France and Ireland"). Unlike the larger silver coins, the groat did not mention George's Hanoverian titles, possibly due to the small size of the coin.

The groat of George II (r. 1727–1760) was by Croker, and bore a left-facing bust of the King, with identical inscriptions but for the Roman numeral II added after GEORGIUS. Though larger denominations of coins transitioned in 1743 to a new portrait by John Sigismund Tanner, the fact that the groat was infrequently struck meant that the earlier design was kept, and was even issued in 1760, the year of George's death, even though the last of the Tanner-designed silver coins were struck in 1758.

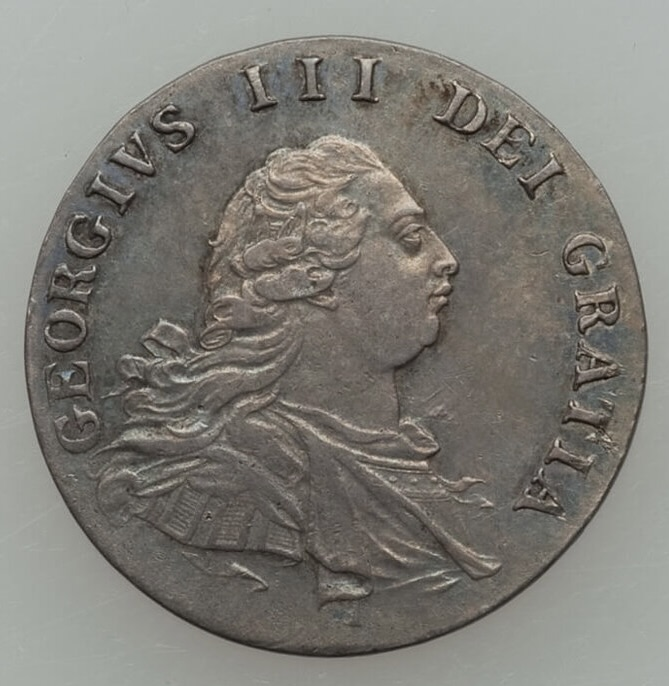
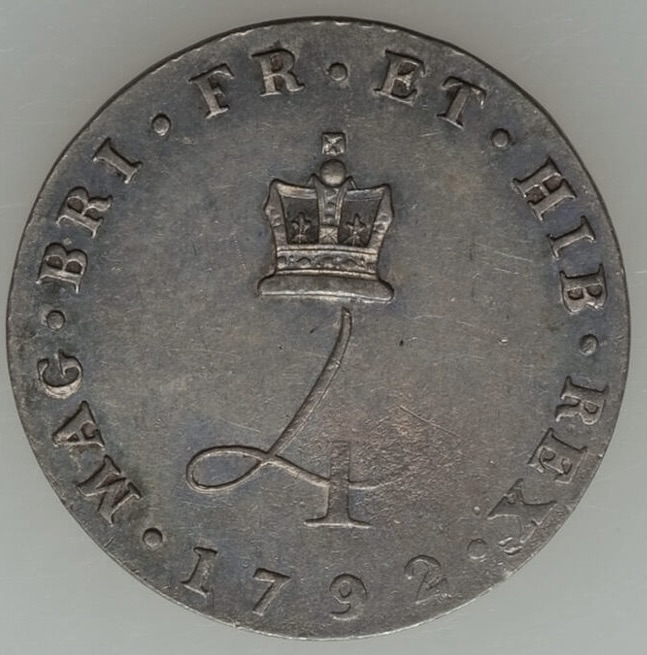
1792 George III "Wire money" groat

The fourpence of George III bears similar inscriptions to that of his predecessor, only the regnal number being changed on the obverse, where there is a right-facing bust of the King. Infrequently struck during George's reign, the obverse of his groat bears three different designs. The first, struck from 1763 to 1786, may have been by Richard Yeo and saw slight modifications to the reverse in 1784 and 1786. The second has a modified bust of King George and a narrow numeral 4 which has led it to be termed "wire money". This was only issued dated 1792; the issues for 1795 and 1800 are similar to the 1786 coins, though with a very different crown. The third obverse, by Benedetto Pistrucci in 1817, moved the date to the obverse and changed the legend on the reverse to BRITANNIARUM REX FID DEF ( ... King of the Britains, defender of the faith). Later-date George III pieces are more likely to be found in better condition and are likely to have been presented at the Royal Maundy ceremony, as are all subsequent fourpences with a crowned 4, though some entered circulation after being presented to the Maundy recipients.

== Britannia issues ==
These pieces are said to have owed their existence to the pressing instance of Mr. Hume, from whence they, for some time, bore the nick-name of Joeys. As they were very convenient to pay short cab fares, the Hon. M. P. was extremely unpopular with the drivers, who frequently received only a groat where otherwise they would have received a sixpence without any demand for change. One driver ingeniously endeavoured to put them out of circulation by giving all he received to his son upon condition that he did not spend them or exchange them. This had, however, one good effect, as it made the man an economist, (Note: That is, one who practices economy, a saver.) and a little store became accumulated which would be useful upon some unexpected emergence. (Note: An emergency.)

— Edward Hawkins, The Silver Coins of England: Arranged and Described with Remarks on British Money (1841), p. 258

In the 1830s, the Royal Mint considered what changes were necessary to the coinage system, which had seen extensive modification in the Great Recoinage of 1816. There was then no coin intended for circulation in the United Kingdom between the penny and the sixpence, and increasing the circulation of one of the denominations struck as Maundy money seemed an obvious solution.

Joseph Hume, the MP for Middlesex, advocated that the groat be issued for circulation. Fourpence was the hackney cab fare in London for up to half a mile (.8 km), Hume pointed out. The Royal Mint concurred that a groat should be issued, stating that it was not too small, would ease the making of payments between sixpence and a shilling (twelve pence), and might even lead to a drop in prices.

King William IV (r. 1830–1837) issued a proclamation making the new groat legal tender on 3 February 1836. The new coin was designed by William Wyon and had a right-facing bust of King William, with the inscription GULIELMUS IIII D G BRITANNIAR REX F D (short for "William IV, by the grace of God, King of the Britains, defender of the faith"). On the reverse, it had the date and the inscription FOUR PENCE, around an image of Britannia, holding a trident in one hand, and with the other on a shield bearing the crosses of the Union Jack. It was thus similar in design to the copper penny, as issued since 1797.

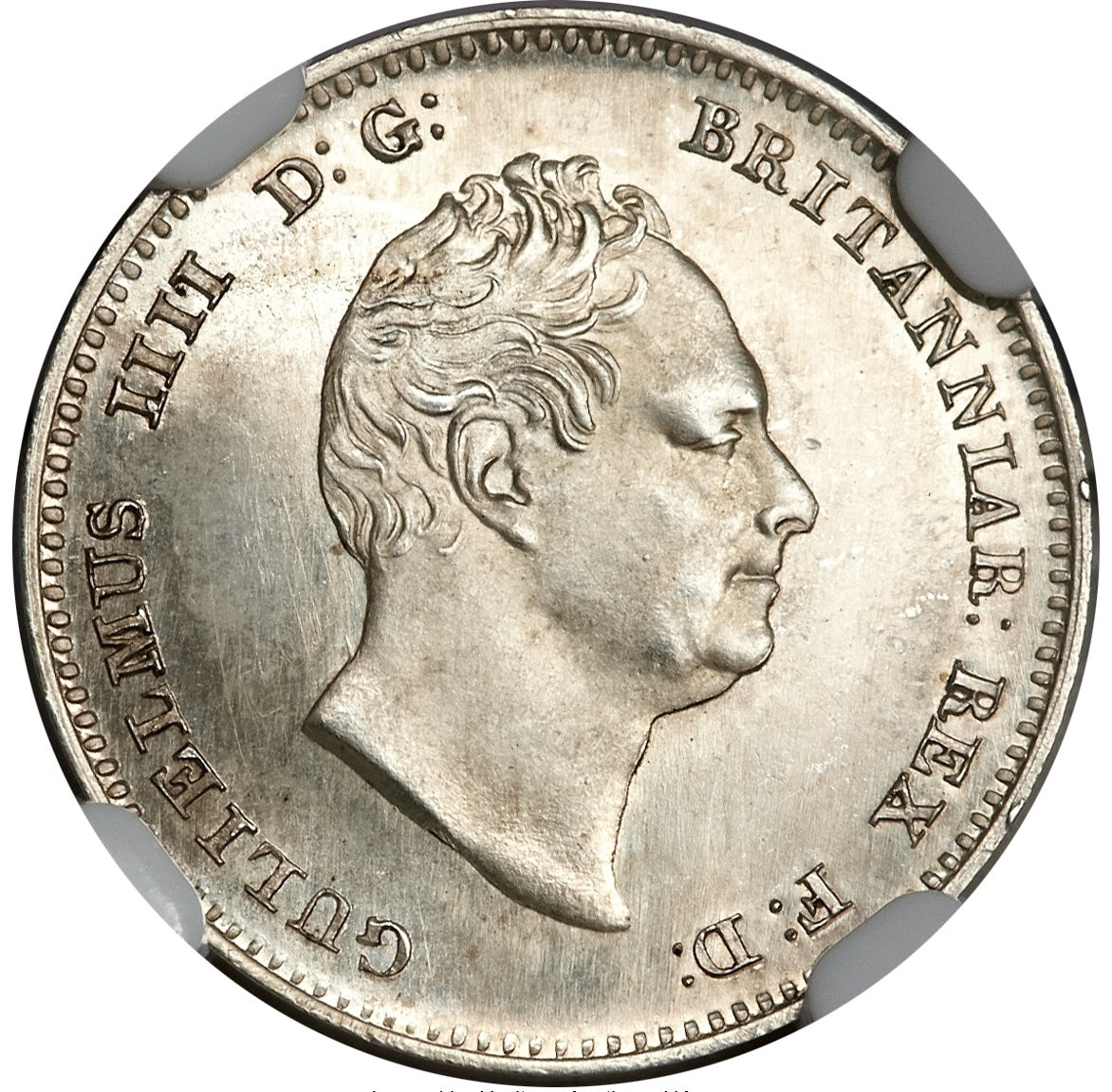
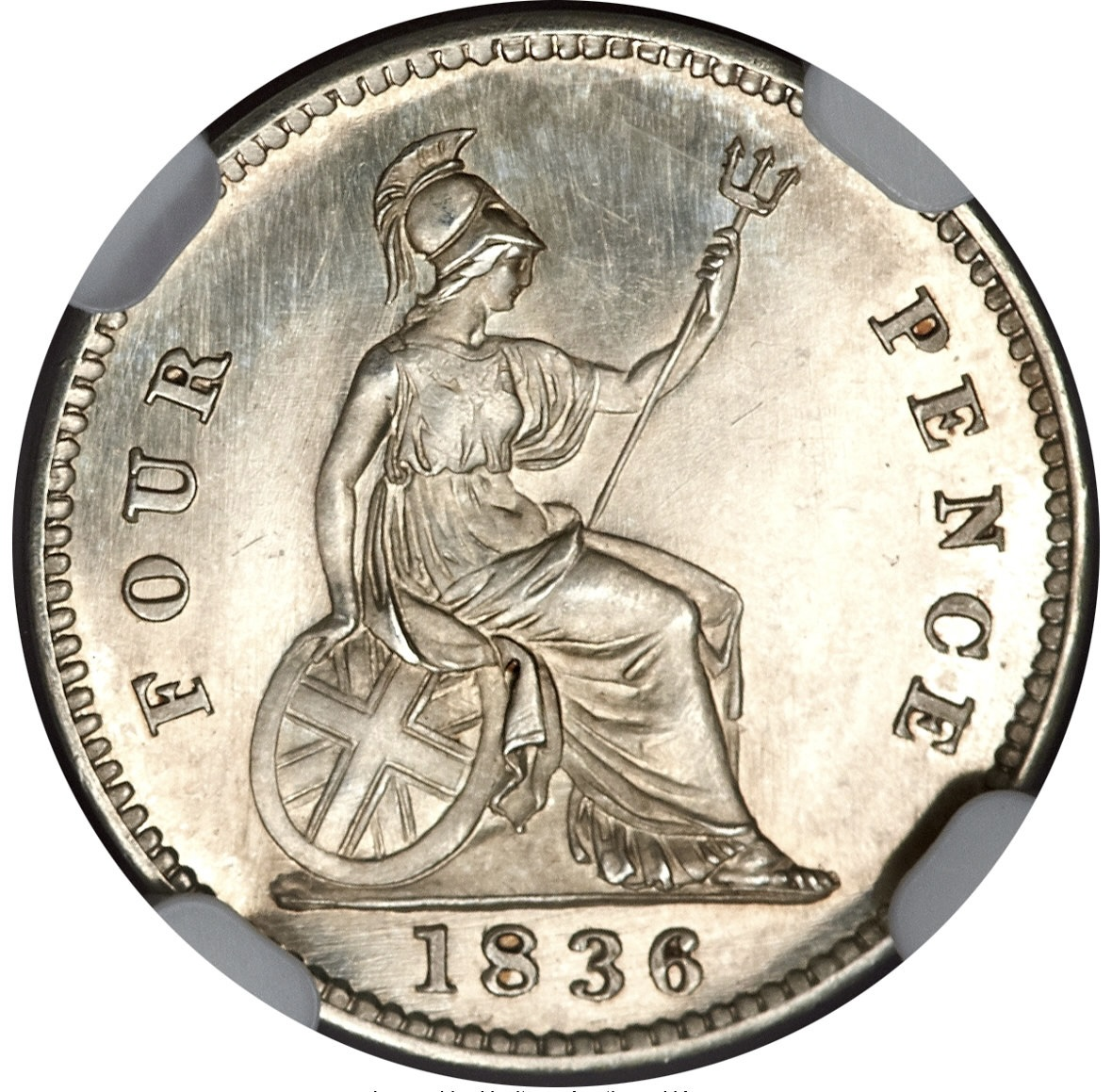
1836 William IV groat

The Preston Chronicle and Lancashire Advertiser deemed the new coin an experimental issue, and noted that with its issuance, any even number of pence could be paid with silver coins, even twopence as a sixpence could receive a groat in change. The Bristol Mirror saw this as an advantage, noting that the current coinage only allowed for exact change in silver for multiples of a sixpence. They suggested that the new groat would allow travellers to tip in silver when a sixpence is deemed too much.

Groats were available for purchase at the Royal Mint, in place of the usual procedure whereby silver coins were circulated through the Bank of England. In Manchester, though, the banks sold eight shillings worth of groats for ten shillings, to cover the cost of conveyance from the Royal Mint in London.

== Reaction, later issues and colonial striking ==
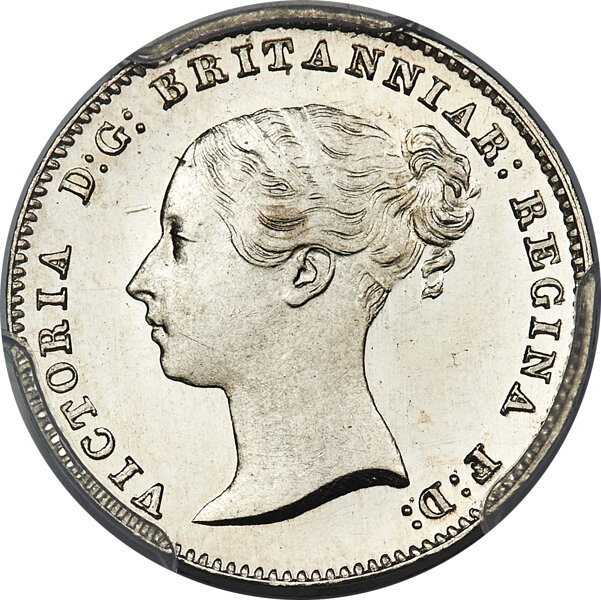
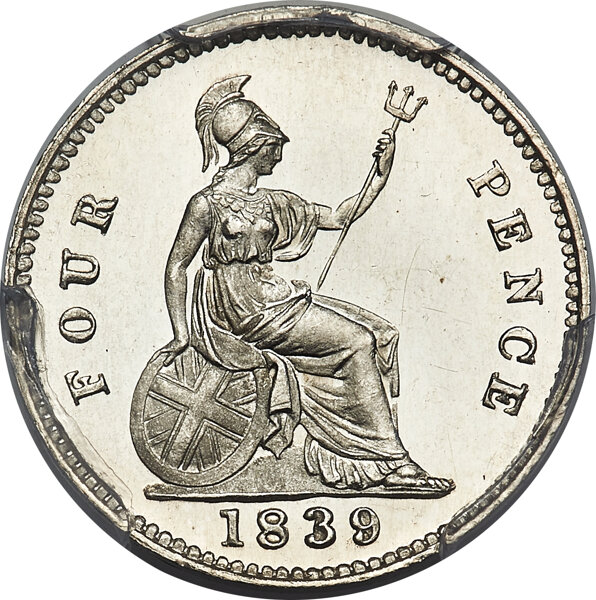
1839 Victoria groat

The new coin proved unpopular with cab drivers as they now simply received a fourpence as payment, whereas previously they would often receive a sixpence without a demand for change. The angry drivers derided the groat, nicknaming it a "joey". It was also confused with the sixpence. Soon after its release, Mr Viner, a butcher of Lambeth Walk, took nine of the groats under the misapprehension they were sixpences. Omnibus owner George Shillibeer stated that one of his conductors had taken 47 of them for sixpences, apparently passed by merchants and their clerks in the evening whilst returning to their homes in Clapham.

The groat was struck bearing William IV's bust in 1836 and 1837, the latter being the year in which he died. Beginning in 1838, the coin bore the portrait, also by Wyon, of Queen Victoria, with the obverse inscription of VICTORIA D G BRITANNIAR REGINA F D (Victoria, by the Grace of God, Queen of the Britains, defender of the faith). It was struck with Wyon's portrait of Victoria each year until 1849, then from 1851 to 1855, and 1857 and 1862, though the final two issues and the 1853 were only as proof coins for collectors.

The threepence was one of the Maundy coins, and was struck for colonial use during the reign of William IV and the first years of Victoria's reign. It was introduced as a circulating coin in Britain in 1845 to "afford additional convenience for the purpose of Change". Like the groat, the threepence could be purchased through the Royal Mint. The threepence was the same diameter as the groat, though the groat was somewhat thicker and had a milled edge to the threepence's smooth edge. It was impractical to have two silver coins of the same diameter, and no groats intended for circulation in Britain were struck after those dated 1855. The groat was more popular in Scotland than in England or Wales, and circulated there for many years after it ceased to elsewhere in Great Britain.

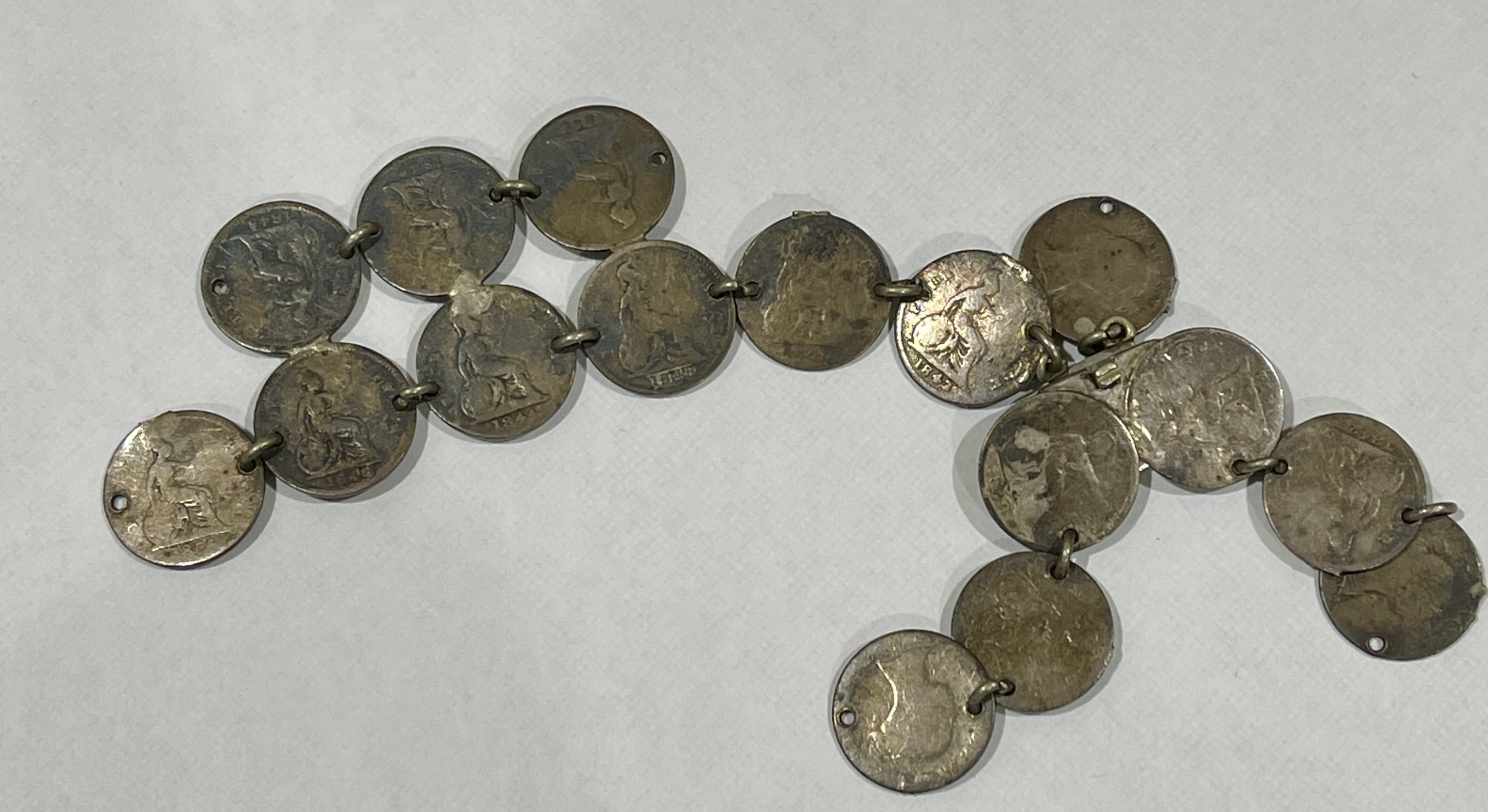
A group of groats joined for use in jewellery

In 1888, a special issue of groats was made intended for use in British Guiana, where they continued to circulate as the equivalent of a quarter guilder, and were the most important coins in commerce. These were struck with Wyon's reverse design and the bust of Victoria that had first been issued in 1887, known as the Jubilee head, by Joseph Boehm. Although valid in Britain, they were intended only for use in British Guiana and the West Indies. These coins, with a total face value of £2,000 (and so a mintage of 120,000), were struck at the special request of the Government of British Guiana, which stated that they were badly needed in the colony, where they were widely used to pay for labour, could not be obtained through the Bank of England, and would be unlikely to return to Britain in any quantity.

== Collecting ==
Fourpences struck under Anne catalogue for between £12 and £200, depending on date and condition; those of George I and II generally fall within that range, 1743-dated pieces reaching £250 if the coin has little wear. For George III pieces, 1765-dated groats are of highest rarity, and are much more expensive than other dates. Britannia groats generally catalogue for between £12 and £200, though proof coins may bring much more, especially if struck in gold. There are several overdates and other varieties, some of which carry a premium over normal coins of that date.

== Mintages ==
William IV
- 1836 ~ 4,253,040
- 1837 ~ 962,280

Victoria
- 1837 ~ 962,280
- 1838 ~ 2,150,280
- 1839 ~ 1,461,240
- 1840 ~ 1,496,880
- 1841 ~ 344,520
- 1842 ~ 724,680
- 1843 ~ 1,817,640
- 1844 ~ 855,360
- 1845 ~ 914,760
- 1846 ~ 1,366,200
- 1847 ~ 225,720
- 1848 ~ 712,800
- 1849 ~ 380,160
- 1850 ~ 594,000 (none known with this date)
- 1851 ~ 31,300
- 1853 ~ 11,880
- 1854 ~ 1,096,613
- 1855 ~ 646,051
- 1856 ~ 95,040 (most likely all were dated 1855)
- 1888 ~ 120,000
- Mintage figures may include coins dated the year previous or year after. Dates for which information is lacking, including the proof-only dates, are omitted.

== Bibliography ==
- Craig, John (2010) [1953]. The Mint (paperback ed.). Cambridge, United Kingdom: Cambridge University Press. ISBN 978-0-521-17077-2.
- Dyer, G.P.; Gaspar, P.P. (1992). "Reform, the New Technology and Tower Hill". In Challis, C.E. (ed.). A New History of the Royal Mint. Cambridge, United Kingdom: Cambridge University Press. pp. 398–606. ISBN 978-0-521-24026-0.
- Lobel, Richard, ed. (1999) [1995]. Coincraft's Standard Catalogue English & UK Coins 1066 to Date (5th ed.). London: Standard Catalogue Publishers Ltd. ISBN 978-0-9526228-8-8.
- Seaby, Peter (1985). The Story of British Coinage. London: B. A. Seaby Ltd. ISBN 978-0-900652-74-5.
- Spink & Son Ltd (2022). Coins of England and the United Kingdom, Decimal Issues 2023 (9th ed.). London: Spink & Son Ltd. ISBN 978-1-912667-93-2.
