= Fourpence =

Fourpence may refer to:

- Groat (English coin) (pre-1707), which was valued at four pence.
- Fourpence (British coin) (1708 - 1888), British obsolete coinage.

== See also ==
- Royal Maundy, the annual service at which the British monarch distributes Maundy money, which includes newly-struck fourpence pieces.
