= George Bower (medallist) =

George Bower (or Bowers) (fl. 1664–1689), was a medallist to King Charles II, James II and William III, and an engraver to the Royal Mint. Although his work displays considerable skill it is inferior in finish and execution to that of the Roettiers, well-known medallists of the same period. The most interesting of Bower's medals may be the specimen struck to commemorate the acquittal of the Earl of Shaftesbury of high treason. It has a bust of the earl on the obverse; on the reverse is the legend "Lætamur, 24 Nov. 1681", and a view of London with the sun bursting from behind a cloud.

== Life ==
In January 1664, Bower was appointed "embosser in ordinary" (engraver) to the Mint, an office which he continued to hold until his death in the early part of 1689 (or 1690). He executed a number of medals for the royal family and private individuals. The production of Shaftesbury specimen gave rise to John Dryden's satire, "The Medal":

Five days he sate for every cast and look,
Four more than God to finish Adam took;
But who can tell what essence angels are,
Or how long Heaven was making Lucifer?

During the reign of Charles II, Bower also made the Restoration medal (1660: reverse, Jupiter destroying prostrate giants, signed "G. Bower"'), the marriage medal (1662 : signed "G. B."), and medals relating to the papist and Rye House plots. Medals he made under James II include a piece commemorating the defeat of Monmouth (signed "G. Bowers"), and specimens referring to the trial of the seven bishops. He also produced a medal celebrating the landing of William III at Torbay in 1688 and the coronation medal of William III and Mary II in 1689.
