= Richard Yeo =

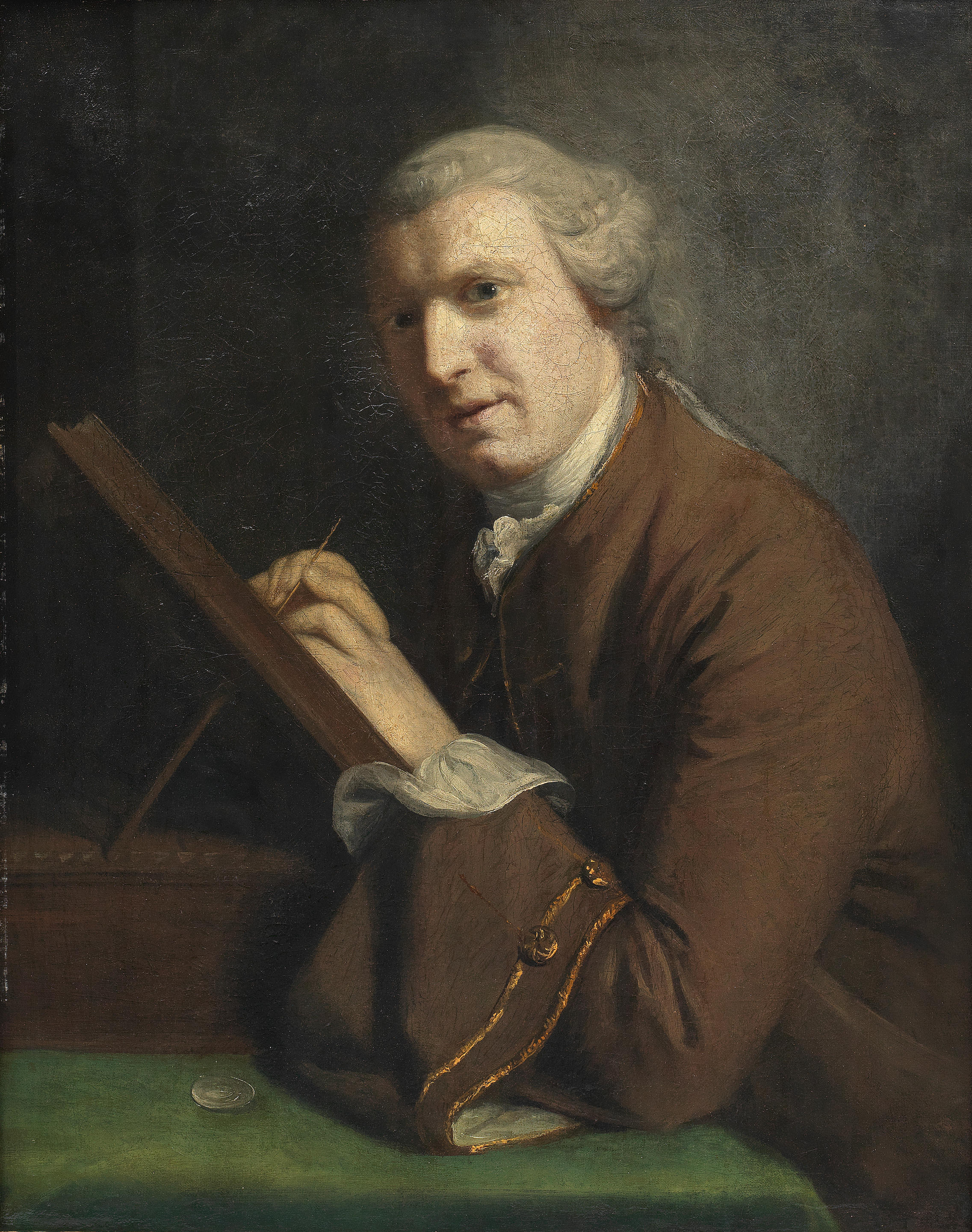
- portrait by Joshua Reynolds
- Born: 1720
- Died: 1779 (aged 58–59); London
- Occupation: Painter, drawer, medalist

Richard Yeo RA (ca 1720–1779) was a British medalist and Chief Engraver at the Royal Mint, in which capacity he supplied patterns for the guinea and five guinea coins of George III. He was a founding member of the Royal Academy of Art, and appears in the group portrait by John Zoffany.

== Life ==
Yeo first came to public notice in 1746, when he produced the official medal for the battle of Culloden, In the same year he issued, by subscription, another Culloden medal, its reverse showing, the Duke of Cumberland as Hercules trampling upon Discord. Before producing these medals Yeo had engraved a seal with the head of the Duke of Cumberland, drawn from life.

In 1749 he was appointed assistant engraver to the Royal Mint, and in 1775 succeeded John Sigismund Tanner as chief engraver, a post he held until his death in 1779.

He was a member of the Incorporated Society of Artists in 1760, and a founding member of the Royal Academy of Art, appearing in the group portrait by John Zoffany. He exhibited at the academy in 1769 and 1770. In the first year he showed a plaster cast of a seal, engraved in steel, for the Marquis of Granby, and three impressions in sealing wax from engravings on gems. In 1770 he showed a proof of his five guinea piece.

His small collection of coins and medals was sold by auction in February 1780, along with his graving tools and colours for painting, which included what the catalogue called "a quantity of his very curious and much esteemed lake"

== Medals engraved ==
- 1746, Culloden Medals
- 1749 Freemasons of Minorca
- 1750 Academy of Ancient Music
- 1752 Chancellor's Medal, Cambridge;
- 1760 Captain Wilson's Voyage to China

He also made two prize medals for Winchester College, and two of the metal admission tickets for Vauxhall Gardens are signed by him. Several other Vauxhall tickets have been attributed to him, one dating to May 1733.

== Sources ==
- "Yeo, Richard" . Dictionary of National Biography. London: Smith, Elder & Co. 1885–1900.
