= John Sigismund Tanner =

Anglo-German engraver

John Sigismund Tanner (1705 – 14 March 1775; German: Johann Sigismund Tanner) was an engraver of the Kingdom of Great Britain, making dies for coins and medals.

Tanner, a native of Saxe-Coburg, worked mostly for the Royal Mint at the Tower of London and was its Chief Engraver from 1741 until his death in 1775. During his latter years he suffered from approaching blindness and many other infirmities and took little part in preparing new dies or other work, which was carried out by his chief assistant and successor Richard Yeo. Under the instruction of Master of the Mint Richard Arundell, Tanner produced replicas of Thomas Simon's coins of 1658. The wider availability of Tanner's sixpences compared to the originals led to them being nicknamed "tanners". This name preserved until decimalisation in 1971.

== Life ==
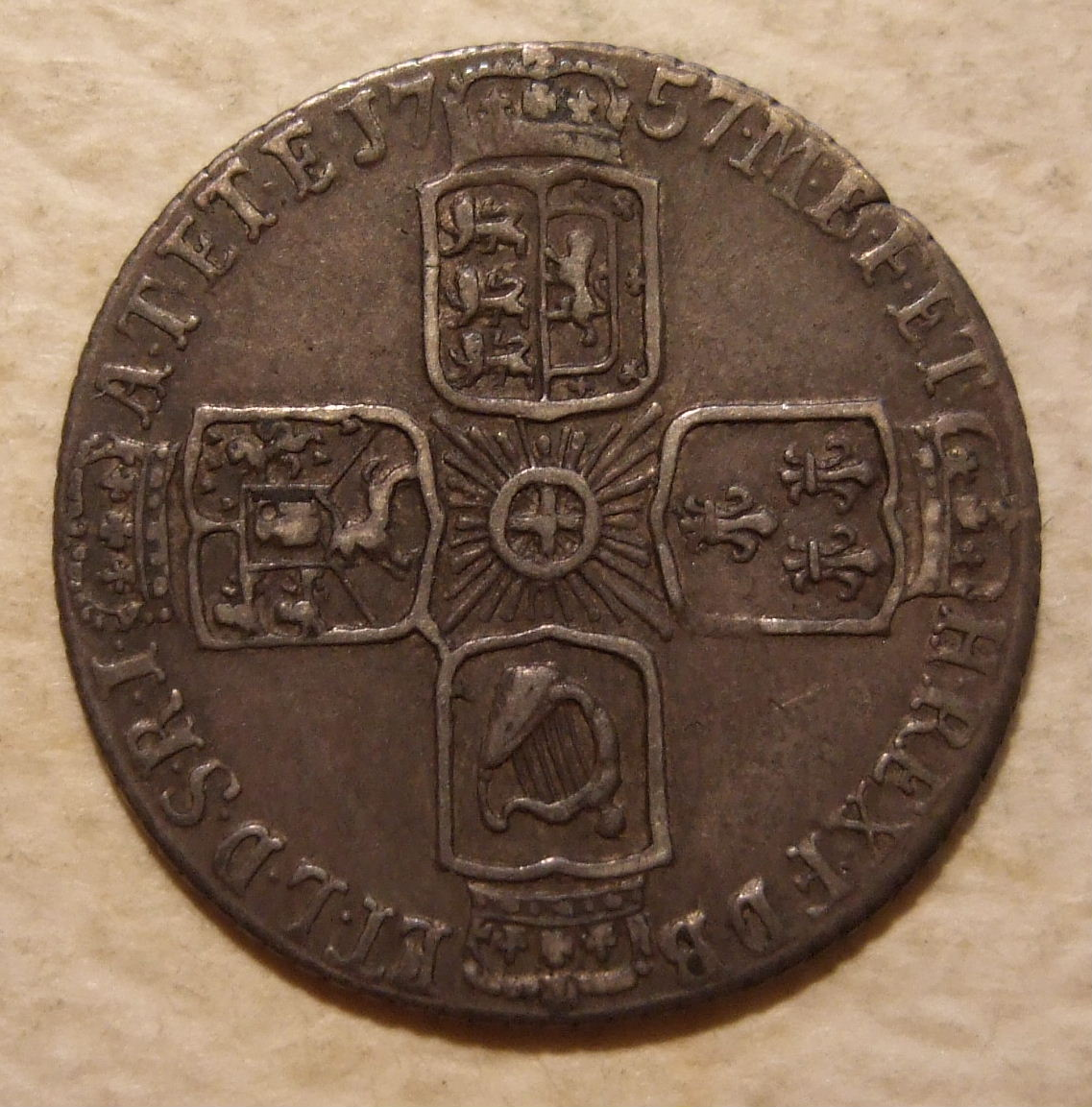
A "tanner" of 1757.

In 1729, the Master of the Mint admitted, with some apprehension, that John Croker, Chief Engraver to the Mint since 1705, was then "the only man now living who has hitherto made Puncheons for the Head on the Coin" and recommended the appointment of an assistant in the shape of Tanner, then aged only 24. When Croker died on 21 March 1741, Tanner succeeded him. After 1739 he engraved most of the dies for the coins of George II and George III.

Tanner died on 14 March 1775, after retiring from the Mint.
