= John Croker (engraver) =

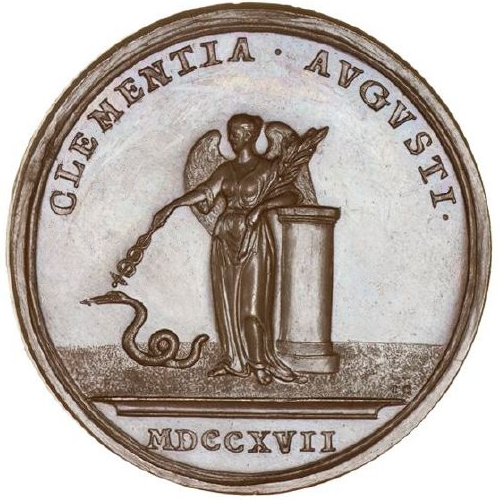
Croker's medal to commemorate the Indemnity Act 1717, dated 1717, signed "I. C." for Iohannis Croker.

John Croker (21 October 1670 – 21 March 1741), born in the Electorate of Saxony and known in his youth as Johann Crocker, was a master jeweller who migrated to London, where he became a medallist and engraved dies for English and later British coins and medals.

For most of his adult life Croker worked in England, serving provincial mints as well as that at the Tower of London. For some seven years he engraved the die stamps for the coins of King William III and Queen Anne before becoming Chief Engraver to the Royal Mint, a position he held from 1705 until his death. He worked closely with the head of the Mint, the scientist Isaac Newton.

== Life ==
Crocker was born at Dresden in 1670, to cabinet-maker John George II, Elector of Saxony, by his marriage to Rosina Frauenlaub. His father died while he was still a small boy, and he was apprenticed to his godfather, a goldsmith and jeweller in Dresden. After completing his apprenticeship, Crocker migrated first to the Netherlands and then in 1691 to England. There, he was employed by a jeweller and worked as a medallist, anglicizing his name to "John Croker". In 1697, he became one of the assistants to the chief engraver of the Royal Mint, Henry Harris. After Harris died in 1704, Croker petitioned Lord Godolphin, Lord High Treasurer of England, to succeed Harris in the position, stating that he had

"...by order of the Lords Commissioners of the Treasury succeeded Mr James Rotier in engraving the puncheons and the dyes for the coinage at the Tower and five country Mints, and... performed the service of graver to the Mint or Mints under Mr Harris for the seven years last past.

The officers of the Mint recommended Croker, and on 7 April 1705 he was chosen chief engraver. In the same year he married a Miss or Mrs Franklin, and they had one daughter, who died in childhood.

Shortly after his appointment at the Mint, Croker received confirmation of his right to issue medals on his own account, which was seen as a means of maintaining his engraving skills. The medal pictured (signed "I. C.", not "J. C.", as the inscription is in Latin) commemorates the Act of Grace of 1717, by which hundreds of Jacobites were freed almost two years after the Jacobite rising of 1715. Struck in silver as well as in bronze, on the obverse is the head of King George I, on the reverse the winged figure of Clemency surrounded by the words "CLEMENTIA AVGVSTI". In her left hand is an olive branch, in her right hand is a caduceus with which she touches the head of a fleeing snake, representing Rebellion.

Almost all of the dies for the coins of Queen Anne and King George I were engraved by Croker, and, until 1740, many for those of George II. He was also the creator of a large number of medals. In 1729 the Master of the Mint admitted, with some apprehension, that Croker was then "the only man now living who has hitherto made Puncheons for the Head on the Coin", and recommended the appointment of an assistant, John Sigismund Tanner, then aged only 24.

Croker's wife died in 1735, but he had good health and eyesight until his last two years. Although ailing, he still did some engraving work and liked to read in his spare time. He died on 21 March 1741 and was succeeded by his assistant, Tanner.

== Medals ==
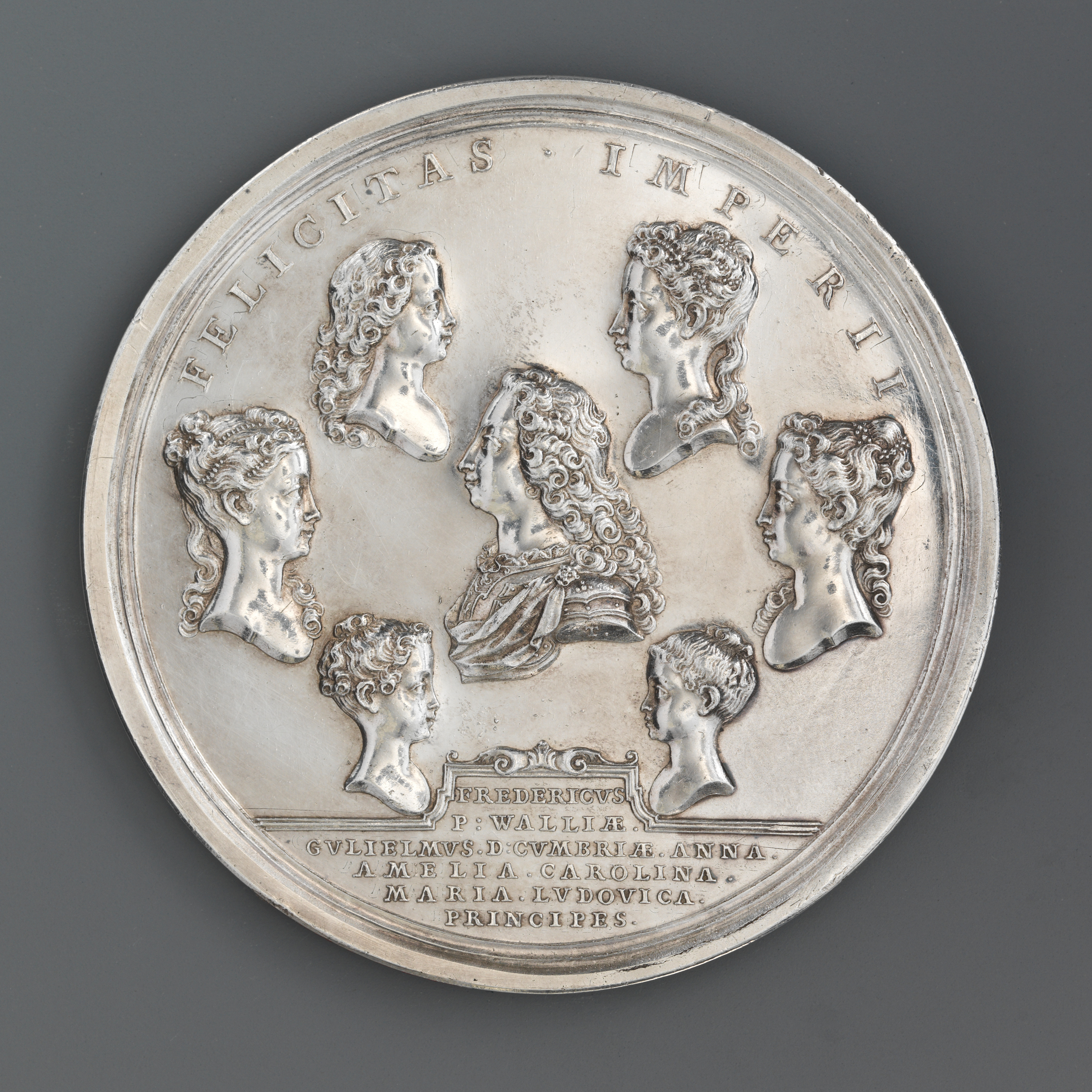
Croker's medal of 1732 showing the surviving children of King George II, Frederick, William, Anne, Amelia, Caroline, Mary, and Louisa

Croker's principal medals are as follows:

- State of Britain after Peace of Ryswick, 1697
- Accession, 1702
- Coronation, 1702 (official medal)
- Anne and Prince George of Denmark, 1702
- Expedition to Vigo Bay 1702, view of Vigo harbour
- Capitulation of Towns on the Meuse, 1702
- Cities captured by Marlborough, 1703
- Queen Anne's Bounty, 1704
- Battle of Blenheim, 1704
- Capture of Gibraltar, 1704
- Barcelona relieved, 1706
- Battle of Ramillies, 1706
- Union of England and Scotland, 1707
- Battle of Oudenarde, 1708
- Capture of Sardinia and Minorca, 1708
- Citadel of Lille taken, 1708
- City of Tournay taken, 1709
- Battle of Malplaquet, 1709
- Douay taken, 1710
- Battle of Almenara, 1710
- The French lines passed, and Bouchain taken, 1711
- Peace of Utrecht, 1713
- Medallic portrait of Queen Anne
- Arrival of George in England, 1714
- Entry into London, 1714
- Coronation, 1714 (official medal)
- Battle of Sheriffmuir, 1715
- Preston taken, 1715
- Act of Grace, 1717 (pictured)
- Treaty of Passarowitz, 1718
- Naval Action off Cape Passaro, 1718
- Caroline, Princess of Wales, 1718
- Order of the Bath revived, 1725
- Sir Isaac Newton, 1726
- Coronation of George II, 1727 (official medal)
- Queen Caroline, Coronation, 1727 (official medal)
- Second Treaty of Vienna, 1731
- Medal of the Royal Family, 1732, obverse only; reverse is by J. S. Tanner
