= Roettiers =

Roettiers is a surname. Notable people with the surname include,

- Charles Norbert Roettiers (1729–1772), French engraver and medallist
- Francois Roettiers (1685–1742), London-born Flemish Baroque artist
- Jacques Roettiers (1707–1784), French engraver and medallist
- Jacques-Nicolas Roettiers (1736-1788), French silversmith
- John Roettiers (1631–1703), English engraver and medallist
- Joseph-Charles Roettiers (1691–1779), French engraver and medallist
- Joseph Roettiers (1635–1703), Flemish medallist
- Norbert Roettiers (1665–1727), Flanders-born engraver and medallist
