= Two guineas (British coin) =

English gold coin

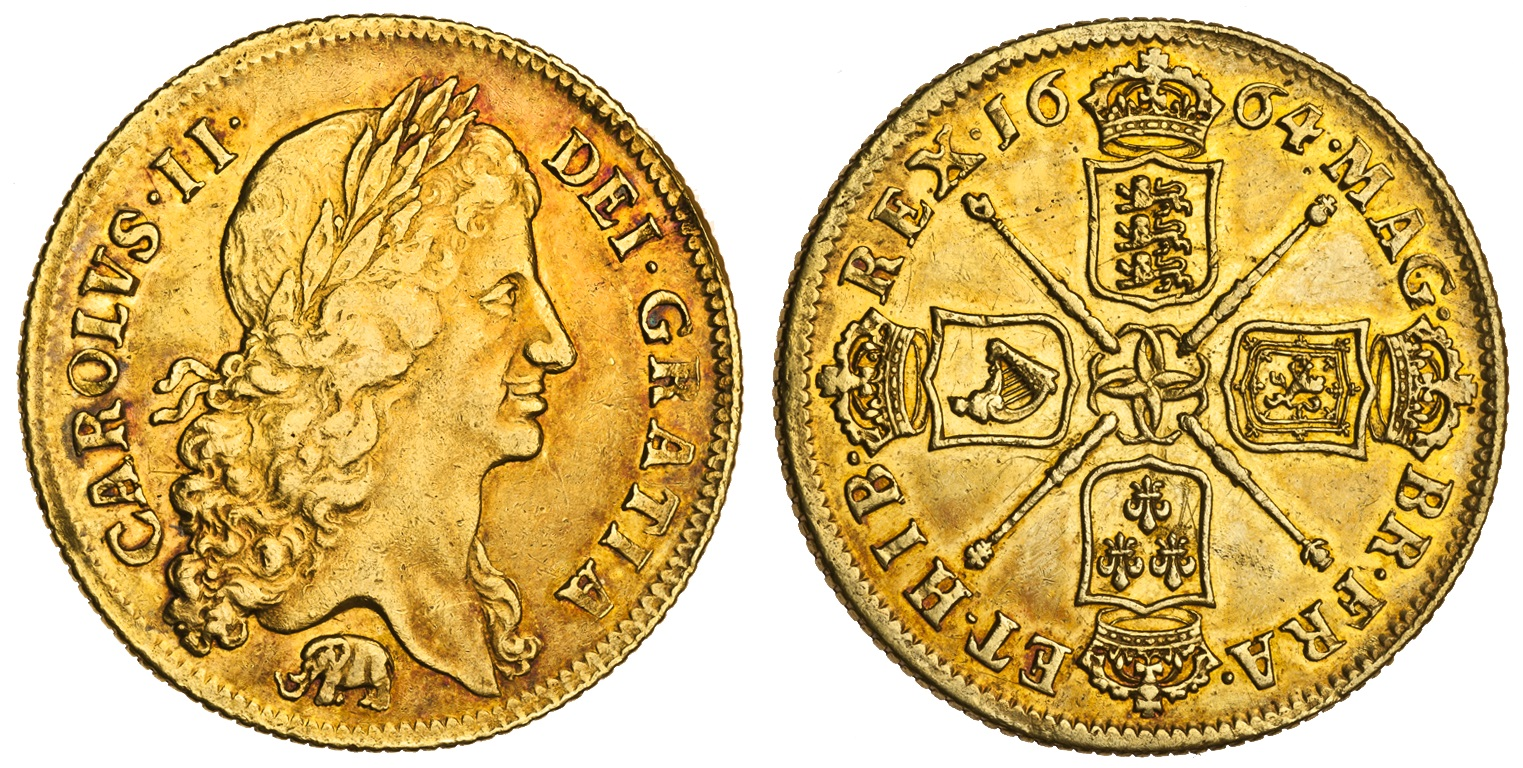
Charles II, Two-Guineas, 1664, struck from gold bullion provided by the Royal African Company. Courtesy Spink and Son Ltd.

The two guinea piece was a gold coin first minted in England in 1664 with a face value of forty shillings. The source of the gold used, also provided the coin its name - the "guinea", with the regular addition of an elephant or castle symbol on the earliest issues to denote bullion supplied by the Royal African Company. For most of its period of production, the coin weighed between 16.7 and 16.8 grams and was 31-32 millimetres in diameter, although the earliest coins of Charles II were about 0.1 grams lighter and 1 millimetre smaller.

The Two guinea coin was produced in 1664, 1665 (possibly only 1 coin), 1669, 1673, and 1675-1684 inclusive; until 1669 the weight limits were 16.6-16.8 grams, afterward 16.5-16.7 grams. The obverse and reverse of this coin were designed by John Roettiers. The obverse showed a fine right-facing bust of the king wearing a laurel wreath, surrounded by the legend CAROLVS II DEI GRATIA, while the reverse showed four crowned cruciform shields bearing the arms of England, Scotland, France, and Ireland, between which were four sceptres, and in the centre were four interlinked "C"s, surrounded by the inscription MAG BR FRA ET HIB REX [date]. The coin was considered too thin to have an edge inscription like the larger contemporary Five Guineas coin, but still required a milled edge to deter counterfeiters from simply gilding contemporary silver Halfcrown coins as well as clipping or filing down of the coin's weight. Until 1668, the milling was perpendicular to the coin, visibly providing vertical grooving, however from 1669 onwards, the milling was obliquely grained.

John Roettiers continued to engrave the dies for this denomination into the reign of King James II. In this reign, the coins weighed 16.7 grams, and were only minted in 1687 and 1688. By the early part of this reign the value of the guinea had increased to nearly thirty shillings. The kings' head faces left in this reign, and is surrounded by the inscription IACOBUS II DEI GRATIA, while the obverse is the same as in Charles II's reign except for omitting the interlinked "C"s in the centre of the coin. The edge of the coins are milled diagonally.

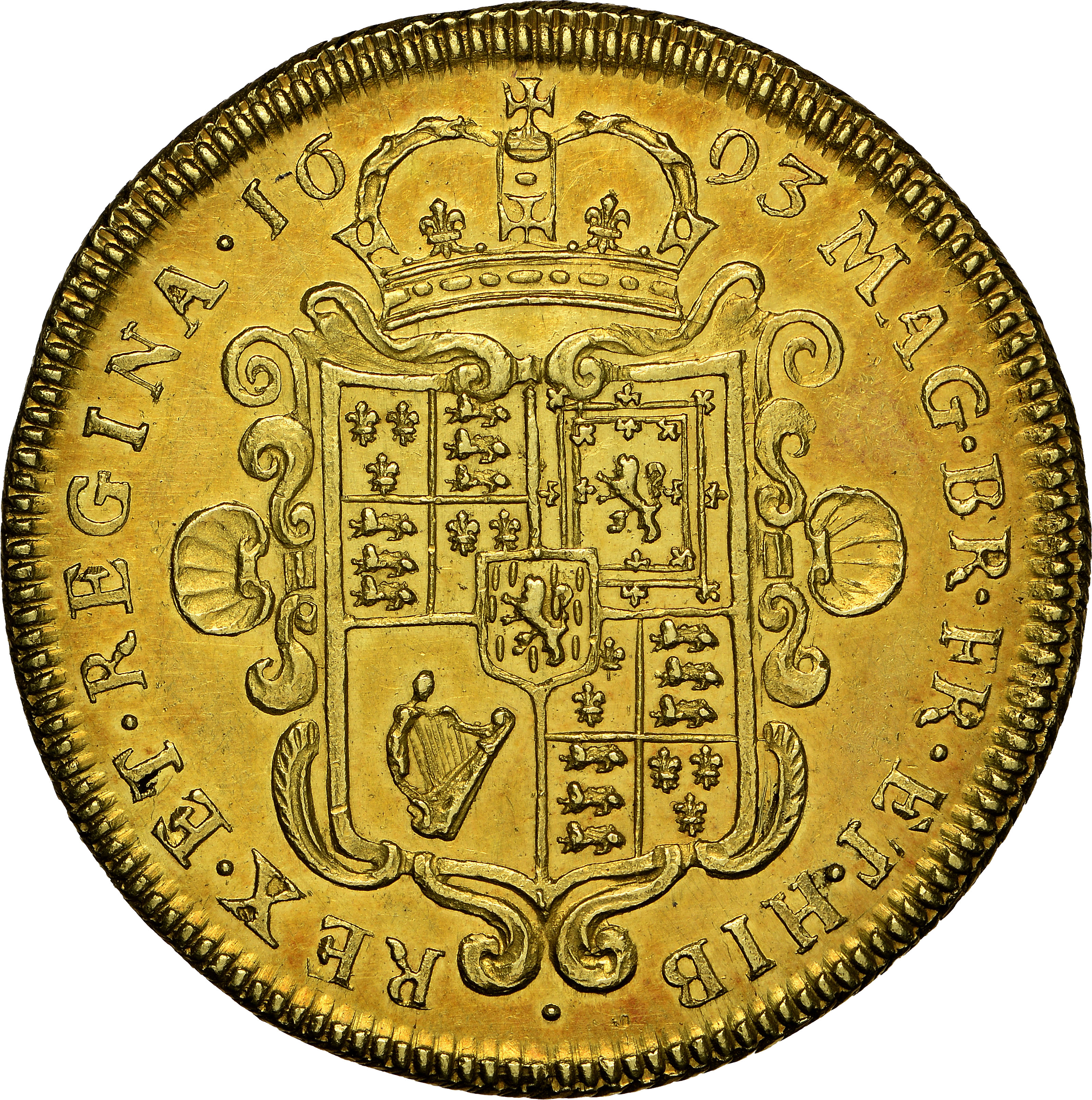
Reverse depicting the adoption of a crowned Royal shield design. Courtesy Spink and Son, Ltd.

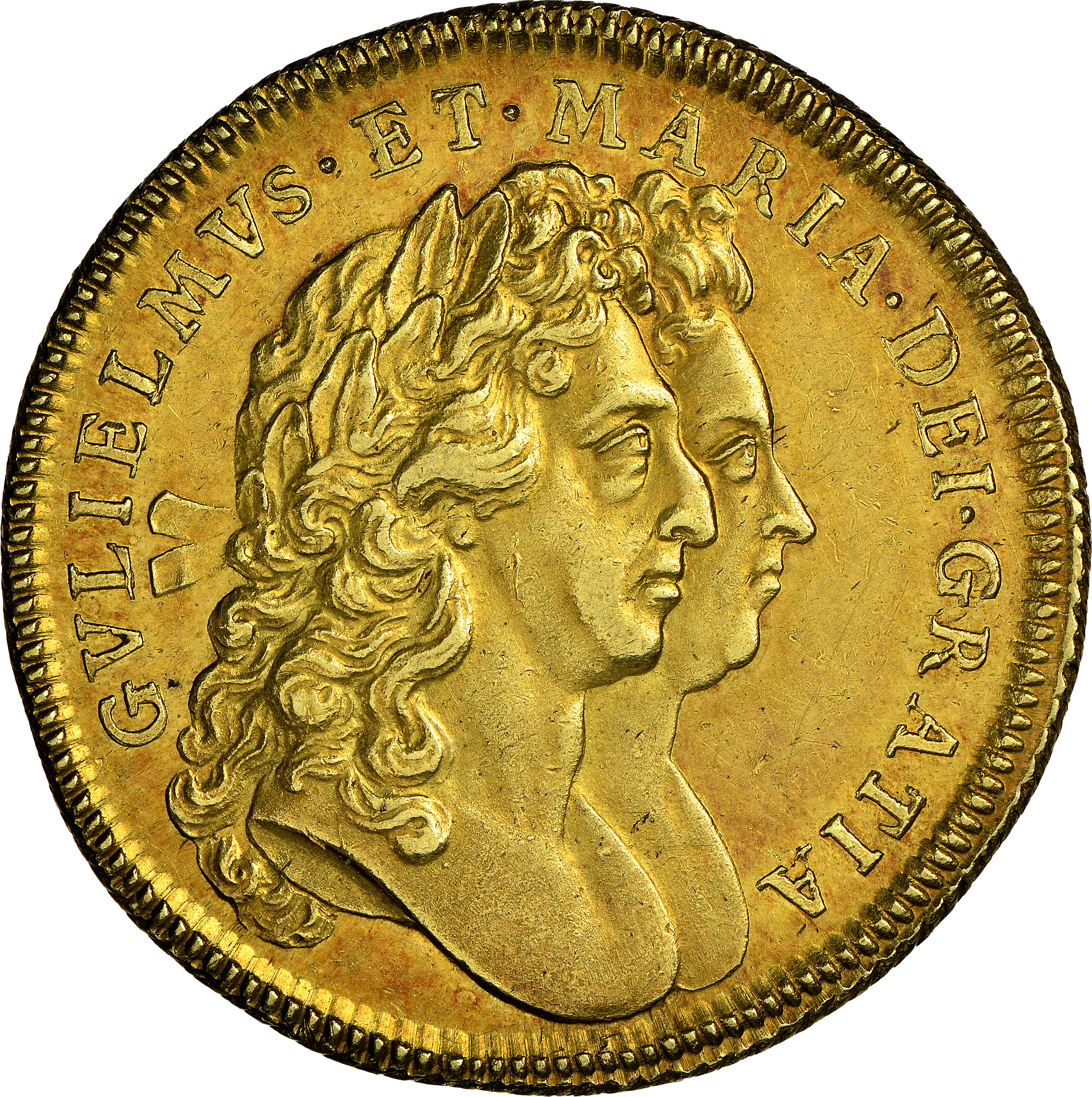
William and Mary, Two-Guineas, 1693, depicting the conjoined busts of their joint reign. Courtesy Spink and Son Ltd.

With the removal of James II in the Glorious Revolution of 1688, his daughter Mary, and her husband Prince William of Orange ruled jointly by agreement as co-monarchs. Their heads appear conjoined on the two guinea piece in Roman style, with William's head uppermost, with the legend GVLIELMVS ET MARIA DEI GRATIA. In a departure from the previous reigns the reverse featured a totally new design of a large crowned shield which bore the arms of France in the first quarter, of Scotland in the second quarter, of Ireland in the third quarter, and of England in the fourth quarter, the whole ensemble having a small shield in the centre bearing the rampant lion of Nassau; the legend on the obverse read MAG BR FR ET HIB REX ET REGINA date. The weight tolerance of the coin in this reign was 16.7-16.8 grams. The two guinea coin of this reign was probably the work of James and/or Norbert Roettier and, apart from a rare issue in 1691, it was only produced in 1693 and 1694.

Following the death of Queen Mary from smallpox in 1694, William continued to reign as William III. The Two guinea coin was only produced in 1701, the design probably being the work of Johann Crocker a.k.a. John Croker, since James Roettier had died in 1698 and his brother Norbert had moved to France in 1695.

The coins of William III's reign weighed 16.7 grams. William's head faces right on his coins, with the legend GVLIELMVS III DEI GRATIA, while the reverse design of William and Mary's reign was judged to be unsuccessful, so the design reverted to that used by Charles II and James II, but with a small shield with the lion of Nassau in the centre, with the legend MAG BR FRA ET HIB REX date. The coin had a diagonal milled edge.

The reign of Queen Anne (1702-1714) did not produce any two guinea coins until after the Union of England and Scotland, the coins being produced in 1709, 1711, 1713 and 1714. The obverse of the coin throughout her reign shows the left-facing effigy of the queen, with the legend ANNA DEI GRATIA. The design of the reverse was similar to that of the previous reign, with four crowned cruciform shields bearing the arms of England and Scotland joined, Ireland, and France, separated by sceptres and with a central rose, and the legend MAG BRI FR ET HIB REG date. With the union, the English and Scottish arms appear conjoined on one shield, with the left half being the English arms and the right half being the Scottish arms, and the order of arms appearing on the shields becomes England and Scotland, France, England and Scotland, Ireland. The centre of the reverse design shows Star of the Order of the Garter. The edge of the coin is milled diagonally.

During the reign of George I, the Royal Proclamation of December 1717 retariffed the Guinea at 21-shillings, and hence its double at forty-two shillings. In reality the value of the Guinea had fluctuated over the years, between twenty and thirty shillings, consequently Two-Guineas were only irregularly issued during this reign, and for the years 1717, 1720, and 1726. They bear the abbreviated titles of the new Hanoverian dynasty in addition to the usual British, French, and Irish claims. The obverse features a right-facing portrait of the king with the legend GEORGIVS D G M BR FR ET HIB REX F D. The reverse follows the same general design as before, except the order of the shields is England and Scotland, France, Ireland, and Hanover, with the legend BRVN ET L DVX S R I A TH ET EL date -- Duke of Brunswick and Luneburg, Arch-Treasurer and Elector of the Holy Roman Empire. The edge of the coin is milled diagonally, and the coins of this reign weighed 16.8 grams.

George II's Two guinea pieces mark the last of the denomination struck for currency issue. Dates struck included 1734, 1735, 1738–1740, 1748, and the last issue in 1753. The coin weighed 16.8 grams. In the early part of the reign the edge of the coin was milled diagonally, but from 1739 following the activities of a particularly bold gang of guinea filers, for whom a reward was posted, the milling was changed to produce the shape of a chevron or arrow-head.

The obverse has a left-facing bust of the king (with an "intermediate head" in 1739 and 1740, and an older head from 1748), with the legend GEORGIVS II DEI GRATIA (GEORGIUS II DEI GRATIA in 1739 and 1740), while the reverse features a single large crowned shield with the quarters containing the arms of England+Scotland, France, Hanover, and Ireland, and the legend M B F ET H REX F D B ET L D S R I A T ET E -- King of Great Britain, France and Ireland, Defender of the Faith, Duke of Brunswick and Luneburg, Arch-Treasurer and Elector of the Holy Roman Empire.

George II's reign is also marked by the introduction of pattern or proof issues of the Two Guinea, struck from carefully prepared and highly polished dies. An example of John Croker's pattern of the Two Guinea of 1733, struck in advance of the first currency issue of the reign recently sold for £38,000 at auction in London.

== George III (1760–1820) ==
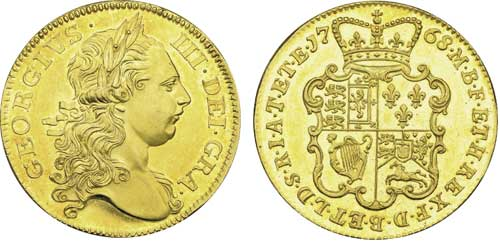
George III, Pattern Two-Guineas, 1768, by John Sigismund Tanner. Courtesy Spink and Son Ltd.

No currency issue Two Guinea coins were struck during George III's reign, however the Royal Mint still engaged in the production of proofs and patterns of the denomination in anticipation of future coinage. As a result, the then Chief Engraver John Sigismund Tanner produced trials of the intended coin for 1768, 1770 and 1773, and latterly his assistant Richard Yeo created a trial coin for 1777. All were created in small quantities and are now extremely sought after by collectors. The present auction record for a Two Guinea, either currency issue or proof is held by an example of the 1768 Pattern, which sold for over £120,000 in New York in January 2014.
