= Alexandre Roëttiers de Montaleau =

French medallist, administrator and Free-Mason (1748–1808)

Alexandre-Louis Roëttiers de Montaleau
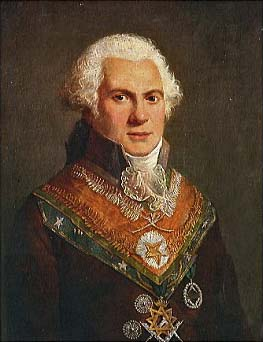
- Portrait of Roëttiers de Montaleau, Musée de la Franc-Maçonnerie, Paris
- Born: 22 November 1748; Paris, Kingdom of France
- Died: 30 January 1808 (aged 59); Paris, French Empire
- Occupations: Medallist, civil servant and mint administrator
- Known for: Leadership of the Grand Orient de France and development of the French Rite
- Father: Jacques Roettiers
- Relatives: Jacques-Nicolas Roettiers (brother)

Alexandre-Louis Roëttiers de Montaleau (22 November 1748 – 30 January 1808) was a French medallist, civil servant, mint administrator and Free-Mason. He served in the Paris Chamber of Accounts and directed the Paris Mint during the French Revolution.

Roëttiers de Montaleau was also one of the most influential leaders of the Grand Orient de France during the revolutionary and Napoleonic periods. He maintained a measure of Masonic activity during the Reign of Terror, protected the archives of the Grand Orient, assisted its reconstruction after the Revolution and contributed to the organization and codification of the French Rite. In 1796 he was elected Grand Vénérable, making him the effective head of the obedience.

== Early life and family ==
Roëttiers de Montaleau was born in Paris on 22 November 1748 into a family of engravers, medallists and royal goldsmiths. His father, Jacques Roettiers, was a goldsmith to the king and belonged to the Roëttiers dynasty of engravers, several members of which worked for the French and British royal mints.

In 1756, Jacques Roëttiers acquired the estates of La Tour and Montaleau at Sucy-en-Brie. His sons subsequently incorporated the names of these estates into their family names: Alexandre-Louis adopted de Montaleau, while his brother, the goldsmith Jacques-Nicolas Roettiers, became known as Roëttiers de La Tour.

Roëttiers de Montaleau was trained in drawing, engraving and medal-making. He initially followed the artistic and mint-related profession of his family but gradually entered royal financial administration. In 1775 he became an auditor in the Paris Chamber of Accounts, and in 1787 he attained the rank of conseiller-maître.

== Public career ==
During the early stages of the French Revolution, Roëttiers de Montaleau entered the administration of the Paris Mint. He was appointed its director in August 1791, replacing Jean Dupeyron de La Coste. His tenure coincided with the reorganization of the French monetary system, political instability and the introduction of revolutionary coinage.

He was arrested during the revolutionary period and his home and offices were searched, but no evidence of financial misconduct was established against him. He was subsequently released and resumed his administrative activities. Because surviving accounts give inconsistent dates for some of these events, particularly when converting dates from the French Republican calendar, the exact chronology of his arrest and reinstatement remains uncertain.

Roëttiers de Montaleau remained associated with the administration of the Mint until the late 1790s. In 1801 he became an administrator of the metalworking establishment at Romilly. He was also an art collector; the Getty Provenance Index records his acquisition of paintings during the revolutionary period and the sale of part of his collection in Paris in 1802.

== Free-Masonry ==
=== Early Masonic activity ===
The exact date of Roëttiers de Montaleau's initiation is not known. Historian Éric Saunier places it probably in 1774 at the Paris lodge L'Amitié. He had attained the rank of Master Mason by 1775 and subsequently served as Worshipful (Venerable) Master of the lodge. He was also associated with the influential Parisian lodges Les Amis Réunis and La Constance.

During the 1780s, he became increasingly active in the central administration of the Grand Orient de France, particularly within its Chamber of Provinces. His work involved relations between the Grand Orient and lodges or chapters outside Paris.

Roëttiers de Montaleau was one of the principal organizers of the Grand Chapitre Général de France and architect of the Orders of Wisdom, established in 1783 to bring the numerous French systems of Masonic high degrees rituals under a more coherent structure of Orders. The chapter was eventually incorporated into the Grand Orient de France.

The work of the Grand Chapter contributed to the arrangement of the many rituals into four principal philosophical orders of wisdom and an administrative or conservatory order known as the fifth Order. Roëttiers de Montaleau also participated in the broader standardization of the ceremonies that became known as the French Rite thus creating the oldest organized masonic system recognized by a Grand Lodge. These rituals were later circulated in manuscript and published in the early nineteenth century in the works commonly called the Régulateur du Maçon and the Régulateur des Chevaliers Maçons.

=== French Revolution ===
In the spring of 1789, Roëttiers de Montaleau installed the Paris lodge Guillaume Tell. In February 1793, as political violence and restrictions on associations brought most French Masonic activity to a halt, he helped establish the lodge Le Centre des Amis.

The lodge provided a point of continuity for Free-Masons who continued to meet during the revolutionary crisis. Roëttiers de Montaleau also took custody of part of the Grand Orient's records and is credited with preserving its central archives when the obedience had largely ceased to function. Saunier states that he maintained a limited form of Masonic activity during 1794 and played a central part in the survival of the institution.

Roëttiers de Montaleau was imprisoned during the Reign of Terror. Later Masonic accounts connected his arrest with his Masonic activities and his protection of the Grand Orient's archives, although the precise grounds recorded by revolutionary authorities are less clear.

=== Reconstruction of the Grand Orient ===
Following the end of the Terror, Roëttiers de Montaleau worked to re-establish the Grand Orient's administrative bodies and reconnect the surviving lodges. In the spring of 1796, a reconstructed assembly elected him Grand Vénérable. Although the traditional office of Grand Master was not immediately restored, the position made him the effective leader of the Grand Orient.

He pursued the reunification of French Free-Masonry, which had been divided before the Revolution between the Grand Orient and organizations descended from the former Grande Loge de France, sometimes called the Grande Loge de Clermont. Negotiations produced a concordat in the late 1790s and contributed to the absorption of the rival organization into the Grand Orient.

Roëttiers de Montaleau's conciliatory approach allowed Free-Masons from previously competing organizations and ritual systems to join the reconstructed Grand Orient. His policies also assisted the rapid expansion of French Free-Masonry during the Consulate and the First French Empire.

On 11 October 1805, Joseph Bonaparte was appointed Grand Master of the Grand Orient de France. Roëttiers de Montaleau was appointed his premier représentant particulier, or first special representative, and continued to exercise substantial responsibility for the day-to-day government of the obedience.

== Death and legacy ==
Roëttiers de Montaleau died in Paris on 30 January 1808, aged 59. His funeral service was held at the Church of Saint-Sulpice in Paris, and a number of Masonic lodges subsequently organized commemorative ceremonies in his honour.

His reputation in French Masonic history rests principally on three activities: the preservation of the Grand Orient's archives and organizational continuity during the Revolution; the reconstruction and reunification of the obedience after the Terror; and his participation in the organization of the French Rite and its philosophical orders.

Masonic historians have consequently described him as one of the principal figures connecting the institutional Free-Masonry of the late Ancien Régime with that of the Napoleonic era. A ceremonial hall at the headquarters of the Grand Orient de France in the Rue Cadet in Paris bears his name.
