= Guinea (coin) =

British gold coin minted between 1663 and 1814

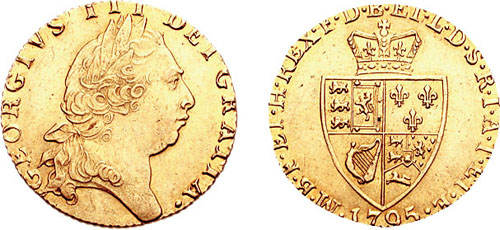
George III, one guinea ("Spade" issue, 1795)

The guinea (/ˈɡɪniː/; commonly abbreviated gn., or gns. in plural) was a coin, minted in Great Britain between 1663 and 1814, that contained approximately one-quarter troy ounce (7.8 g) of gold. The name came from the Guinea region in West Africa, from where much of the gold used to make the coins was sourced. It was the first English machine-struck gold coin, originally representing a value of 20 shillings in sterling specie, equal to one pound, but rises in the price of gold relative to silver caused the value of the guinea to increase, at times to as high as thirty shillings. From 1717 to 1816, its value was officially fixed at twenty-one shillings, (one pound and one shilling, £1.05, equivalent to £88.50 in 2025).

In the Great Recoinage of 1816, the guinea was demonetised and replaced by the gold sovereign. Following this, the word "guinea" was retained in some fields as a unit of account and pricing, even though the coins were no longer in use. It was commonly used well into the 20th century for professional fees, which were often invoiced in guineas; and continues in use in the 21st century in horse racing and greyhound racing, and in the pricing of some works of art.

As of 2026, at Tattersalls, bidding on horses is in guineas, but the seller is paid the same number of pounds, the difference providing the auctioneer's commission.

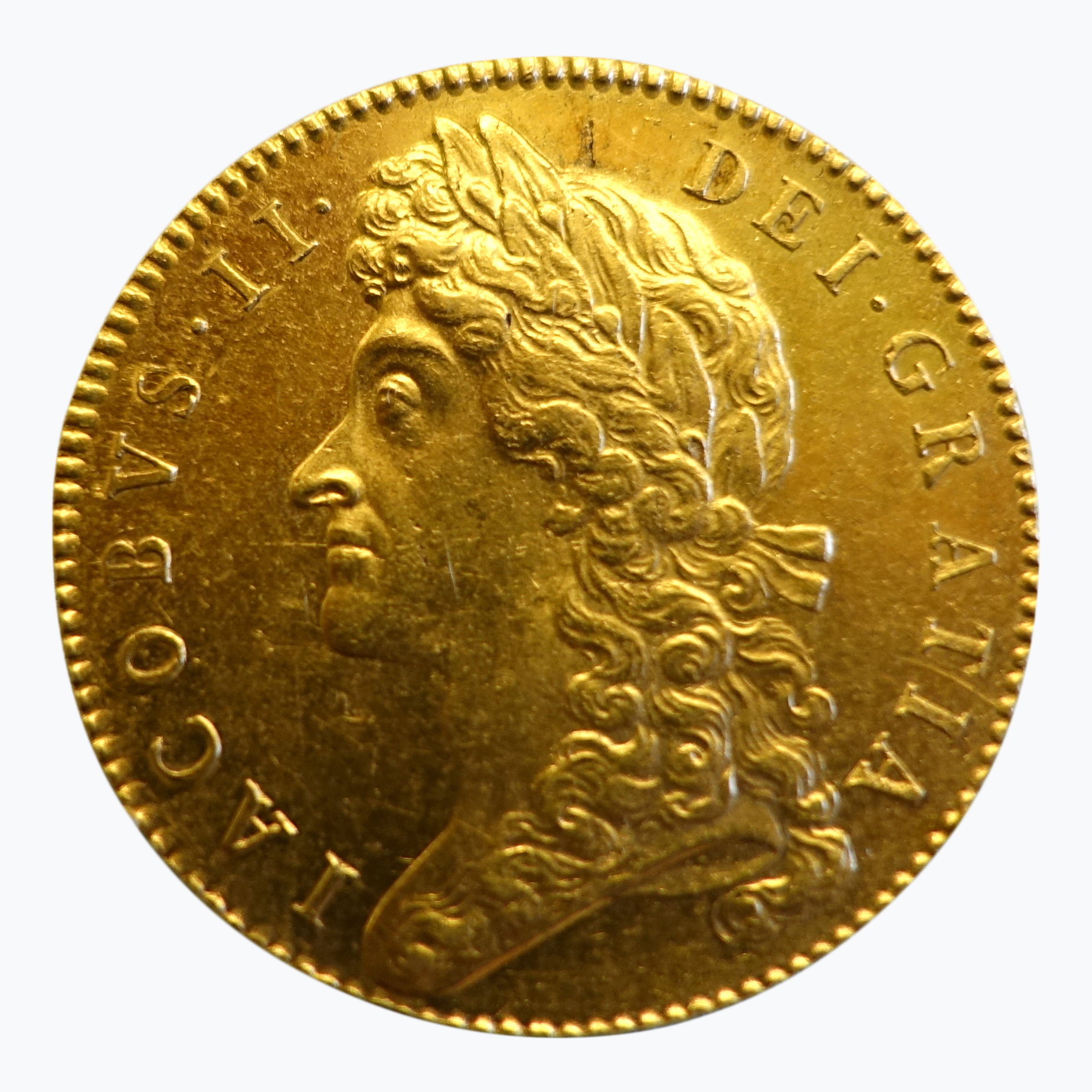
Five-guinea coin, James II, Great Britain, 1688

== Origin ==
The first guinea was produced on 6 February 1663 (363 years ago); a proclamation of 27 March 1663 made the coins legal tender. One troy pound of 11/12 (0.9133) fine gold (22 carat or 0.9167 pure by weight) would make 44 1/2 guineas, each thus theoretically weighing 129.438 grains (8.385 grams crown gold, 7.688 grams fine gold, or 0.247191011 troy ounces of fine gold).

The coin was originally worth twenty shillings (one pound), but an increase in the price of gold during the reign of King Charles II led to the market trading it at a premium. The price of gold continued to increase, especially in times of trouble, and by the 1680s, the coin was worth 22 silver shillings. Indeed, in his diary entries for 13 June 1667, Samuel Pepys records that the price was 24 to 25 shillings.

The diameter of the coin was one inch (25 mm) throughout Charles II's reign, and the average gold purity (from an assay done in 1773 of samples of the coins produced during the preceding year) was 0.9100. "Guinea" was not an official name for the coin, but much of the gold used to produce the early coins came from Guinea (largely modern Ghana) in West Africa.

The coin was produced every year between 1663 and 1684, with an elephant appearing on some coins each year from 1663 to 1665 and 1668, and the elephant with a castle on other coins minted from 1674 or 1675 onwards. The elephant, with or without a castle, was the emblem of the Royal African Company (RAC), which had been granted a monopoly on English trade with Africa in slaves, gold and other goods, from 1672 until 1698; gold imported from Africa by the RAC bore the elephant emblem beneath the monarch's head on the coin.

== Seventeenth century ==
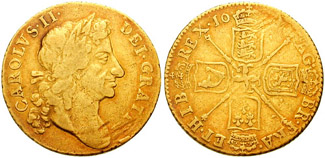
Guinea of King Charles II

The obverse and reverse of this coin were designed by John Roettiers (1631–c. 1700). The obverse showed a fine right-facing bust of Charles II wearing a laurel wreath (amended several times during the reign), surrounded by the legend carolvs ii dei gratia ("Charles II by the grace of God"), while the reverse showed four crowned cruciform shields bearing the arms of England, Scotland, France, and Ireland, between which were four sceptres, and in the centre were four interlinked "C"s, surrounded by the inscription mag br fra et hib rex ("Of Great Britain, France, and Ireland King"). The edge was milled to deter clipping or filing, and to distinguish it from the silver half-crown which had edge lettering. Until 1669 the milling was perpendicular to the edge, giving vertical grooves, while from 1670 the milling was diagonal to the edge.

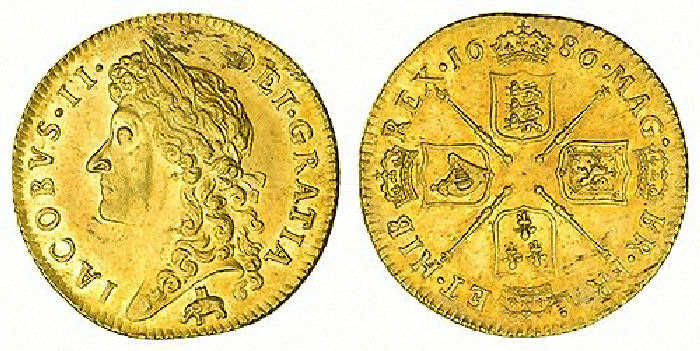
King James II, with elephant and castle under the bust, 1686

=== James II ===
John Roettiers continued to design the dies for this denomination during the reign of King James II. In this reign, the coins weighed 8.5 g (0.27 ozt) with a diameter of 25–26 mm (0.98–1.02 in), and were minted in all years between 1685 and 1688, with an average gold purity of 0.9094. Coins of each year were issued both with and without the elephant-and-castle mark. The king's head faces left in this reign, and is surrounded by the inscription iacobvs ii dei gratia ("James II by the grace of God"), while the reverse is the same as in Charles II's reign except for omitting the interlinked "C"s in the centre of the coin. The edge of the coins are milled diagonally.

=== William & Mary ===
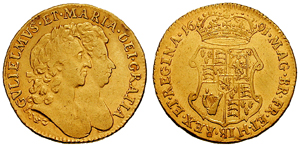
William and Mary

With the removal of James II in the Glorious Revolution of 1688 his daughter Mary and her husband, Prince William of Orange, reigned jointly as co-monarchs. Their heads appear conjoined on the guinea piece in Roman style, with William's head uppermost, with the legend gvlielmvs et maria dei gratia (William and Mary by the grace of God). In a departure from the previous reigns, the reverse featured a totally new design of a large crowned shield bearing the arms of England and France in the first and fourth quarters, of Scotland in the second quarter and of Ireland in the third quarter, the ensemble having a small shield in the centre bearing the rampant lion of Nassau; the legend on the obverse read mag br fr et hib rex et regina (Of "Magna Britannia" Great Britain, "Francia" France and "Hibernia" Ireland King and Queen) and the year. By the early part of this reign the value of the guinea had increased to nearly 30 shillings. The guineas of this reign weighed 8.5 g (0.27 ozt), were 25–26 mm (0.98–1.02 in) in diameter and were the work of James and Norbert Roettiers. They were produced in all years between 1689 and 1694 both with and without the elephant and castle; in 1692 and 1693 the mark of the elephant alone was also used.

Following the death of Queen Mary from smallpox in 1694, William continued to reign as William III. The guinea coin was produced in all years from 1695 to 1701, both with and without the elephant and castle, the design probably being the work of Johann Crocker, also known as John Croker, since James Roettiers had died in 1698 and his brother Norbert had moved to France in 1695.

The coins of William III's reign weighed 8.4 g (0.27 ozt) with an average gold purity of 0.9123. The diameter was 25–26 mm (0.98–1.02 in) until 1700 and 26–27 mm (1.02–1.06 in) in 1701. William's head faces right on his coins, with the legend gvlielmvs iii dei gratia, while the reverse design of William and Mary's reign was judged to be unsuccessful so the design reverted to that used by Charles II and James II but with a small shield with the lion of Nassau in the centre, with the legend mag br fra et hib rex and the year. The coin had a diagonal milled edge.

== Eighteenth century ==
=== Queen Anne ===
During the reign of Queen Anne (1702–1714) guineas were produced in all years between 1702 and 1714 except for 1704. The 1703 guinea bears the word vigo under the Queen's bust, to commemorate the origin of the gold taken from Spanish ships captured at the Battle of Vigo Bay.

With the Acts of Union 1707 creating a unified Kingdom of Great Britain through the union of the Parliament of Scotland with the Parliament of England, the design of the reverse of the first truly British guinea was changed. Until the Union, the cruciform shields on the reverse showed the arms of England, Scotland, France, and Ireland in order, separated by sceptres and with a central rose, and the legend mag br fra et hib reg ("Of Great Britain, France, and Ireland Queen") and the year. With the Act of Union, the English and Scottish arms appear conjoined on one shield, with the left half being the English arms and the right half being the Scottish arms, and the order of arms appearing on the shields becomes England and Scotland, France, England and Scotland, Ireland. The elephant and castle can appear on the coins of 1708 and 1709. The centre of the reverse design shows the Star of the Order of the Garter.

The coins weighed 8.3 g (0.27 ozt), were 25 mm (0.98 in) in diameter, and had a gold purity of 0.9134. The edge of the coin is milled diagonally.

The dies for all guineas of Queen Anne and King George I were engraved by John Croker, an immigrant originally from Dresden in the Duchy of Saxony.

=== George I ===
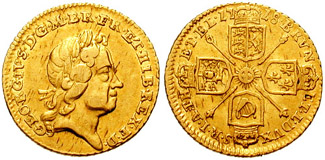
George I: Quarter guinea (1718)

King George I's guinea coins were struck in all years between 1714 and 1727, with the elephant and castle sometimes appearing in 1721, 1722 and 1726. His guineas are notable for using five different portraits of the king, and the 1714 coin is notable for declaring him to be Prince Elector of the Holy Roman Empire. The coins weighed 8.3–8.4 grams and were 25–26 millimetres in diameter, and the average gold purity was 0.9135.

The 1714 obverse shows the right-facing portrait of the king with the legend georgivs d g mag br fr et hib rex f d (George, by the grace of God of Great Britain, France, and Ireland King, Fidei Defensor), while the later coins bear the legend georgivs d g m br fr et hib rex f d. The reverse follows the same general design as before, except the order of the shields is England and Scotland, France, Ireland and Hanover, with the legend in 1714 brvn et lvn dux s r i a th et pr el ("Duke of Brunswick and Lueneburg, Arch-Treasurer and Prince Elector of the Holy Roman Empire") and the year, and in other years brvn et l dux s r i a th et el ("Duke of Brunswick and Lueneburg, Arch-Treasurer and Elector of the Holy Roman Empire") and the year. The edge of the coin is milled diagonally.

The value of the guinea had fluctuated over the years from 20 to 30 shillings and back down to 21 shillings and sixpence by the start of George's reign. In 1717 Great Britain adopted the gold standard, at a rate of one guinea to 129.438 grains (8.38 g, 0.27 ozt) of crown gold, which was 22 carat gold, and a royal proclamation in December of the same year fixed the value of the guinea at 21 shillings sterling. In Ireland the guinea was fixed to a value of 22 (Irish) shillings and ninepence, effectively pegging the Irish pound to sterling at a rate of 13 Irish pounds to 12 pounds sterling.

=== George II ===
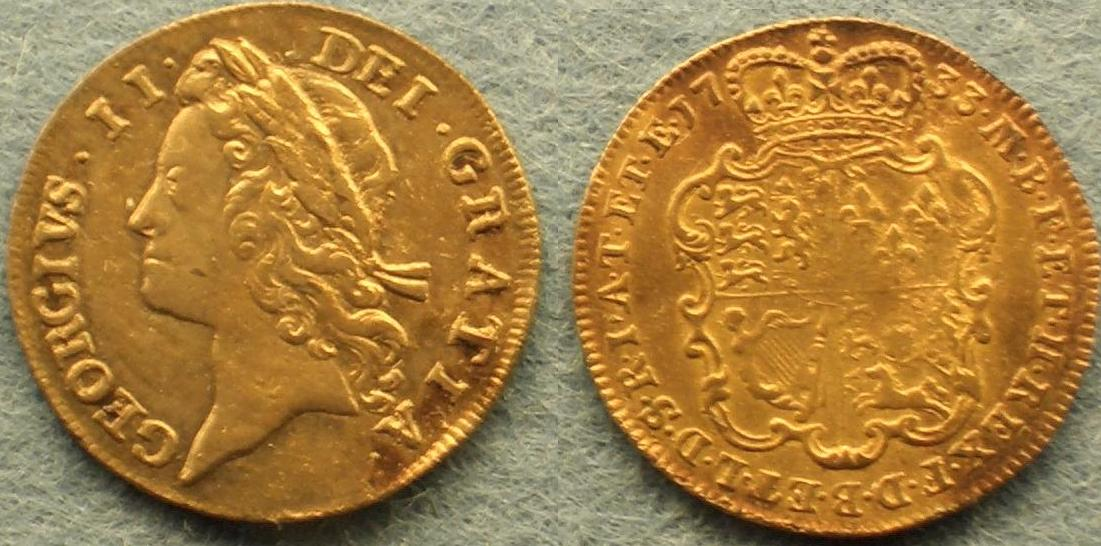
George II (two guinea)

King George II's guinea pieces are a complex issue, with eight obverses and five reverses used through the 33 years of the reign. The coins were produced in all years of the reign except 1742, 1744, 1754, and 1757. The coins weighed 8.3–8.4 g (0.27–0.27 ozt), and were 25–26 mm (0.98–1.02 in) in diameter except for some of the 1727 coins which were 24–25 mm. The average gold purity was 0.9140. Some coins issued between 1729 and 1739 carry the mark eic under the king's head, to indicate the gold was provided by the East India Company, while some 1745 coins carry the mark lima to indicate the gold came from Admiral George Anson's round-the-world voyage. In the early part of the reign the edge of the coin was milled diagonally, but from 1739 following the activities of a particularly bold gang of guinea filers for whom a reward was posted, the milling was changed to produce the shape of a chevron or arrowhead. In 1732 the old hammered gold coinage was demonetised, and it is thought that some of the old coins were melted down to create more guineas.

The obverse has a left-facing bust of the king with the legend georgivs ii dei gratia (georgius ii dei gra between 1739 and 1743), while the reverse features a single large crowned shield with the quarters containing the arms of England+Scotland, France, Hanover, and Ireland, and the legend m b f et h rex f d b et l d s r i a t et e ("King of Great Britain, France and Ireland, Defender of the Faith, Duke of Brunswick and Lüneburg, Arch-Treasurer and Elector of the Holy Roman Empire").

Unlike the two-guinea and five-guinea coins, production of the guinea continued through much of the long reign of King George III.

=== George III ===
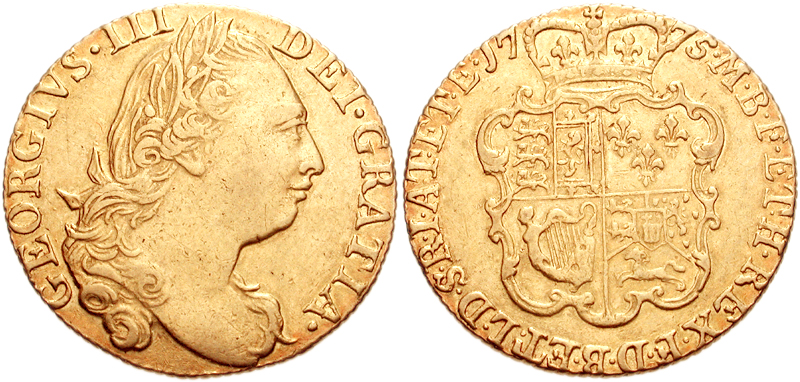
George III, 1775 guinea

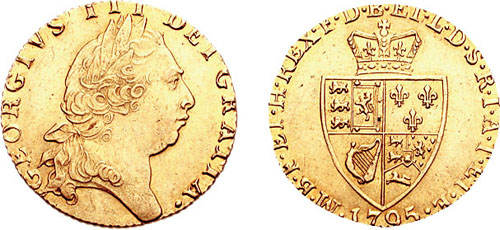
George III, spade guinea, 1795

The guineas of King George III weighed 8.4 g (0.27 ozt) and were 25 mm (0.98 in) in diameter, with an average gold purity (at the time of the 1773 assay) of 0.9146 (meaning it contained 7.7 g (0.25 ozt) of gold). They were issued with six different obverses and three reverses in 1761, 1763–79, 1781–99, and 1813. All the obverses show right-facing busts of the king with the legend georgivs iii dei gratia with different portraits of the king. The reverse of guineas issued between 1761 and 1786 show a crowned shield bearing the arms of England+Scotland, France, Ireland and Hanover, with the legend m b f et h rex f d b et l d s r i a t et e and the date ("King of Great Britain, France and Ireland, Defender of the Faith, Duke of Brunswick and Lüneburg, Arch-Treasurer and Elector of the Holy Roman Empire"). In 1787 a new design of reverse featuring a spade-shaped shield was introduced, with the same legend; this has become known as the spade guinea.

In 1774 almost 20 million worn guineas of King William III and Queen Anne were melted down and recoined as guineas and half-guineas.

Towards the end of the century gold began to become scarce and rise in value. The French Revolution and the subsequent French Revolutionary Wars had drained gold reserves and people started hoarding coins. Parliament passed a law making banknotes legal tender in any amount, and in 1799 the production of guineas was halted, although half- and third-guineas continued to be struck. Following the Act of Union between Great Britain and Ireland in 1800, the king's titles changed, and an Order in Council of 5 November 1800 directed the Master of the Mint to prepare a new coinage, but although designs were prepared, the production of guineas was not authorised.

== Nineteenth century ==
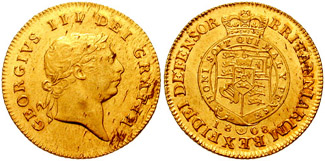
1808 Half guinea – George III

In 1813 it was necessary to strike 80,000 guineas to pay the Duke of Wellington's army in the Pyrenees, as the local people would accept only gold in payment. This issue has become known as the Military Guinea. At this time, gold was still scarce and the guinea was trading on the open market for 27 shillings in paper money, so the coining of this issue for the army's special needs was a poor deal for the government, and this was the last issue of guineas to be minted. The reverse of the military guinea is a unique design, showing a crowned shield within a Garter, with honi soit qui mal y pense on the Garter, and britanniarum rex fidei defensor ("King of the Britains, Defender of the Faith") around the edge, and "1813" between the edge inscription and the garter.

=== Replacement by the pound ===
In the Great Recoinage of 1816, the guinea was replaced by the pound as the major unit of currency and in coinage by the sovereign.

== Twentieth century onwards ==
After the guinea coin ceased to circulate, the guinea continued in use as a unit of account worth 21 shillings (£1.05 in decimalised currency). The guinea had an aristocratic overtone, so professional fees, and prices of land, horses, art, bespoke tailoring, furniture, white goods and other "luxury" items were often quoted in guineas until a couple of years after decimalisation in 1971. In 2002, Erik Samuelson agreed to be paid the nominal sum of one guinea a year for his role as chief executive of The Dons Trust because "it sounded posher than a pound". Samuelson retired in 2019. The guinea was used in a similar way in Australia until that country converted to decimal currency in 1966, after which it became worth $2.10.

Bids are still made in guineas for the sale of racehorses at auction, at which the purchaser will pay the guinea-equivalent amount but the seller will receive only that number of pounds. The difference (5p in each guinea) is traditionally the auctioneer's commission (which thus, effectively, amounts to 5% on top of the sales price free from commission). Many major horse races in Great Britain, Ireland, Canada, New Zealand and Australia bear names ending in "Guineas", even though the real values of their purses today are much higher than the £1,050 or £2,100 suggested by their names. (Note: for example, the Caulfield Guineas, the 2000 Guineas Stakes, New Zealand 1000 Guineas)

=== Commemorative £2 coin (2013) ===
In 2013 the Royal Mint issued a £2 coin to celebrate the 350th anniversary of the minting of the first guinea coin. The new coin was designed by the artist Anthony Smith and features a reworking of the spade guinea from the late 18th century. The edge of the coin contains a quotation from the writer Stephen Kemble: "What is a guinea? 'Tis a splendid thing." This was the first time in the United Kingdom that one coin has been used to celebrate another.

== Gallery ==
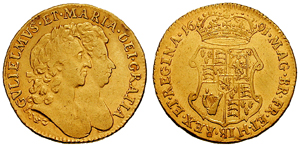
William and Mary

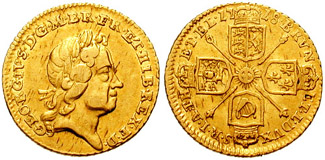
George I (quarter guinea)

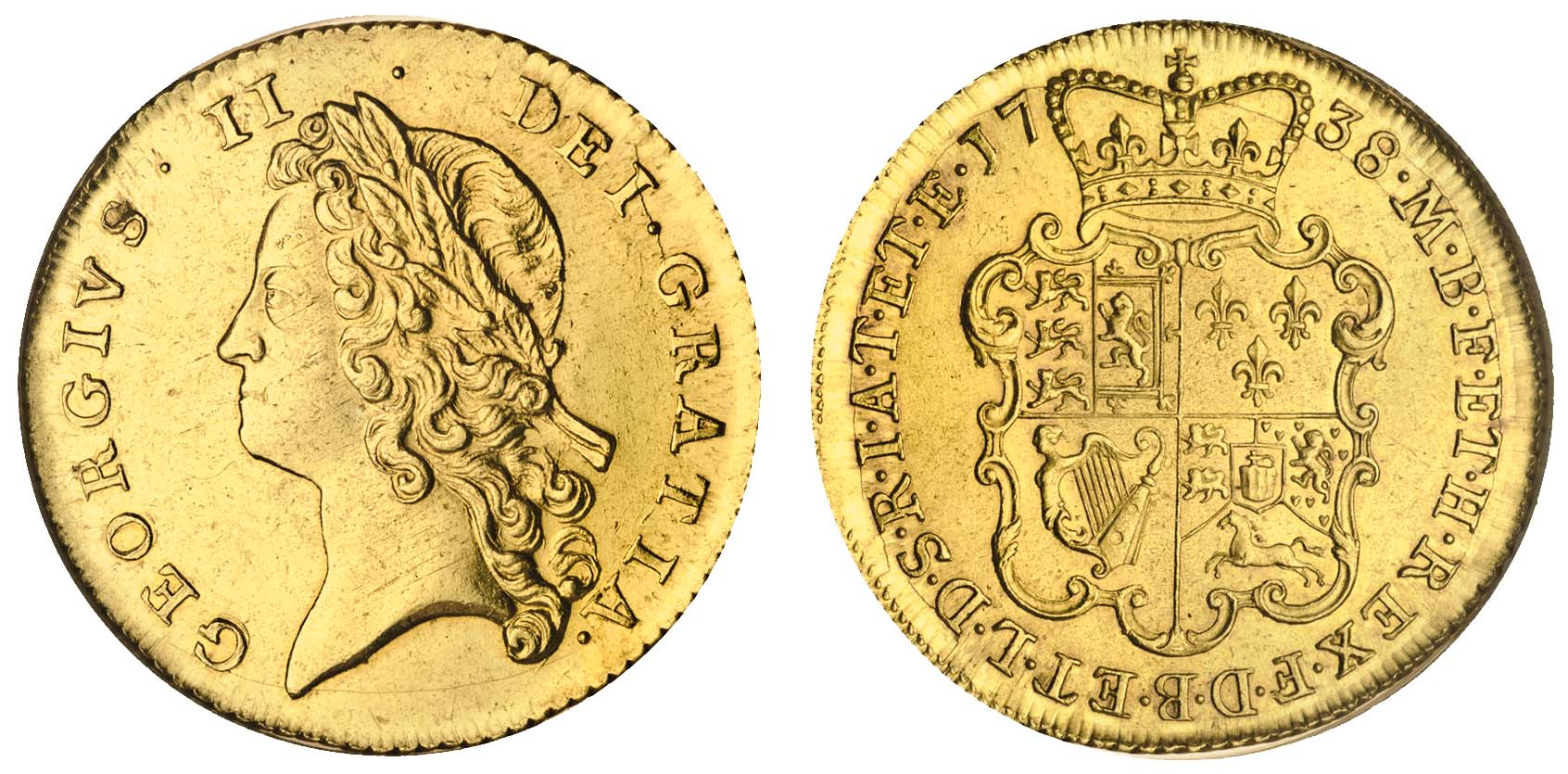
George II (two guineas)

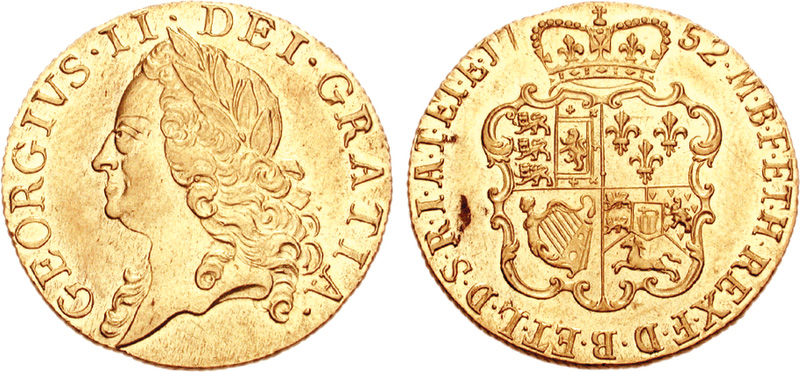
George II

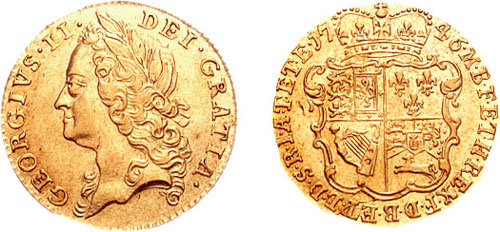
George II (half guinea)

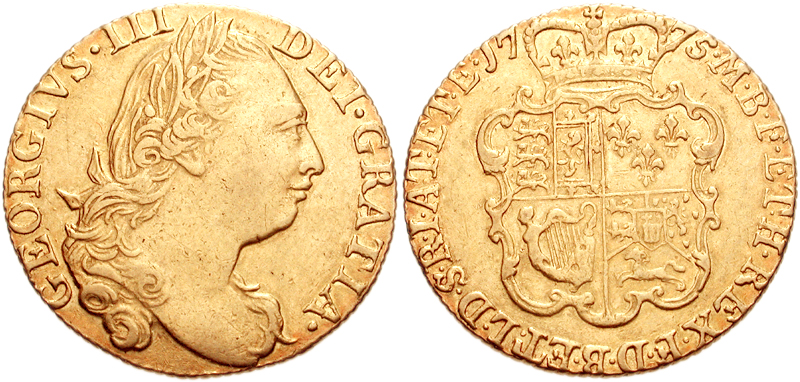
George III

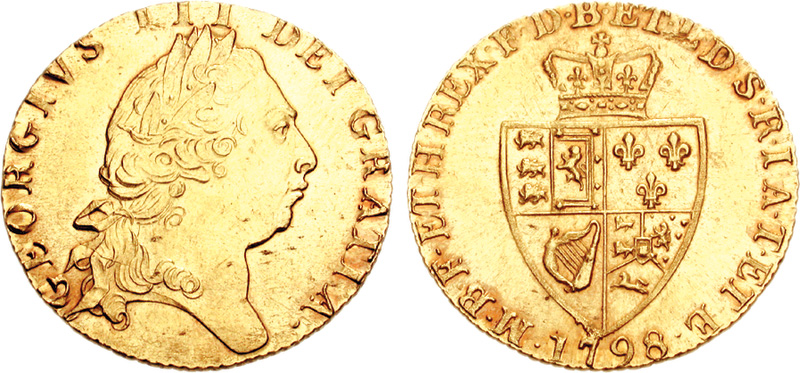
George III, "Spade" issue, 1798

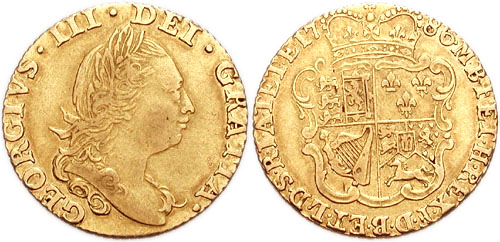
George III (half guinea)

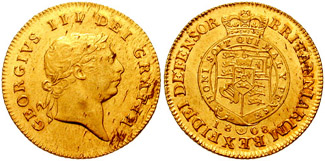
George III (half guinea)

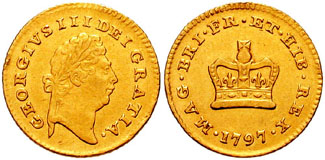
George III (third guinea)

== See also ==
- Angel (coin), the coin the guinea replaced.
- Sovereign (coin), the coin the guinea was replaced by.
