= Josef Benedikt Kuriger =

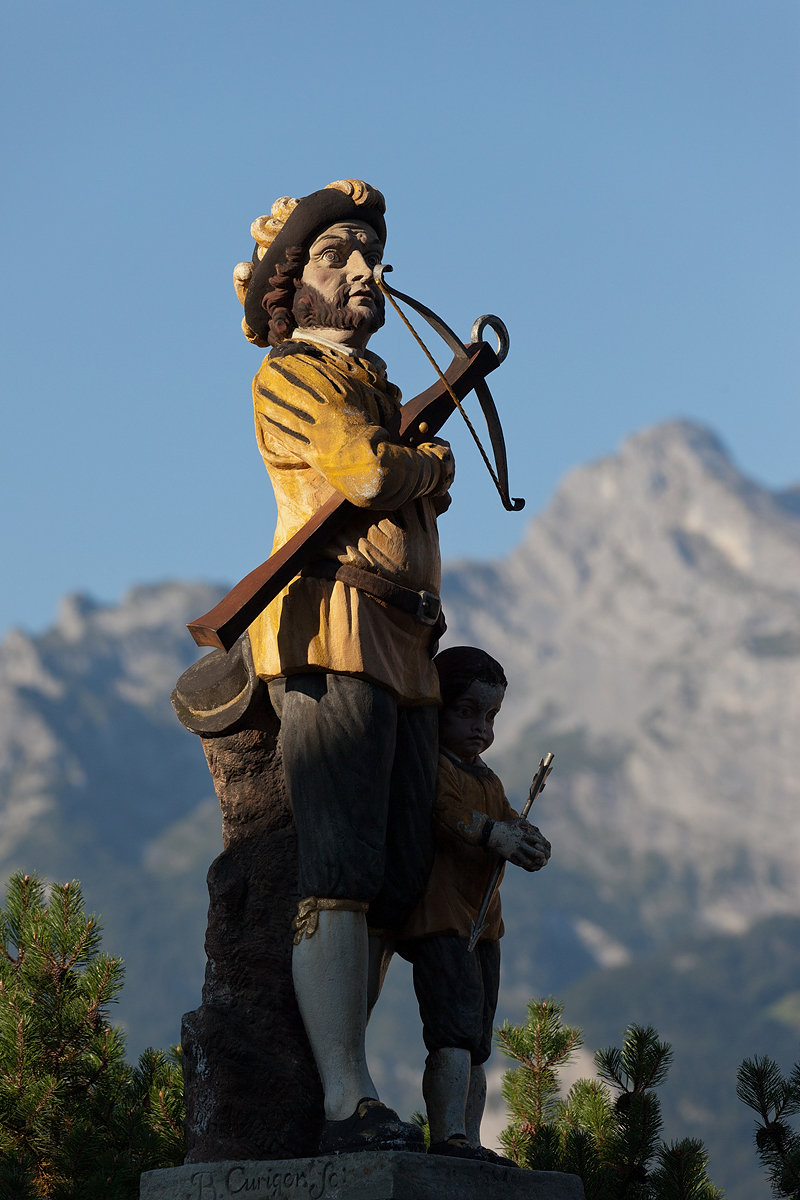
William Tell (1786)

Josef Benedikt Kuriger (May 25, 1754 in Einsiedeln, Schwyz – July 6, 1819 in Wettingen) was a Swiss goldsmith, sculptor, modeller and model maker who pioneered embryological modeling.

Josef Benedikt Kuriger was the son of goldsmith Augustin Mathias Kuriger (1723–1780), and the younger brother of the goldsmith and wax sculptor Josef Anton Kuriger (1750–1830). In c. 1768, Joseph Benedikt followed his brother Joseph Anton to Paris. There he was taught by the sculptor Étienne-Pierre-Adrien Gois. Some sources say that he was first taught by Jean-Baptiste Lemoyne.

Kuriger's work at the anatomical theatre in Paris gave him the experience to move from portraits and devotional objects to anatomy and obstetrics. Kuriger created wax models of embryos, based on Samuel Thomas von Soemmerring's Icones embryonum humanorum her. In c. 1778, he returned to Einsiedeln and settled there, only occasionally returning to Paris.

The William Tell monument behind the St. Peter and Paul Church in Bürglen (since 1891) was created by Josef Benedikt Curiger in 1786.

Among Joseph-Benoist Couriger's works that have survived are also his anatomical models of the human body (now in the Vesalianum in Basel). They were shown at the art exhibition in Bern in 1804 and were recently studied by Adrian Christoph Suter There are more anatomical models by him in the Narrenturm museum (Vienna).

In addition, there is the bust of Beaumarchais at the Comédie-Française, signed "Couriger fecit anno 1774", and all the more precious for being the only authentic contemporary bust of the author of Beaumarchais. Some of his works are difficult to trace. The Schweizerisches künstler-lexikon mentions two marble bust portraits made from nature (of Captain von Hertenstein and Lieutenant von Reding); "portraits in relief from white and coloured wax, alabaster and fine clay, as well as bas-reliefs, floral pieces and other works of unsurpassable truth and delicacy" and, "In the Einsiedeln cabinet", the portraits of Napoleon I, Marie Louise and the King of Rome, which he painted [modelled, in fact] in Paris in 1811 [or 1810]. "Archives alsaciennes" mentions the terracotta bust of a young officer signed and dated 1773 in the Musée des Arts Décoratifs de Paris (Given by Charles-Jules Maciet, 1846–1911. It could be the "Terracotta bust of a man in court costume with long hair tied back" (Couriguer, 1773) displayed at the "Marie-Antoinette and her time" exhibition at the galerie Sedelmeyer in 1894. The Musée des Arts Décoratifs has a terracotta bust matching this description (10773), and also has a terracotta-coloured wax medallion, which is not attributed but could be by Joseph-Anton (or Antoine) Couriguer. "Archives alsaciennes" also mentions a male bust in the Martin Le Roy Collection. According to the Catalogue raisonné de la collection Martin Le Roy this is a bust of the actor Molé, but the attribution to Couriguer is only a hypothesis.

The Swiss National Museum has a photo of "Terrakotten von Kuriger" taken at the 1883 National Exhibition LM-75910.91. The museum also houses a painted terracotta figure of Mary with the child (1790–1800) from the church in Lauerz. The Fram Museum in Einsielden owns four slate moulds made by Joseph-Benoist. They were used to make tin religious articles such as monstrances, candlesticks, crosses, flower stands, and holy figures for home altars and used by children to play "Pfärrerlis," a game in which they reenacted church services.

Josef Benedikt Kuriger's sons were also artists, the first (and best known) one being Ildefons Kuriger (Einsiedeln 1782–1841 Vienna), sculptor and painter, modeller, draughtsman. Augustin Mathias Kuriger (Einsiedeln 15.12.1787-Paris 01.10.1811) and Franz Xaver Kuriger (Einsiedeln 13.02.1790-Paris 02.10.1811), also wax sculptors in Paris, died there in 1811 under unexplained circumstances. The Schweizerisches Künstler-Lexikon says that "one of them was said to have murdered the other; according to another report, they were eliminated due to artistic jealousy." Both were trained by Étienne-Pierre-Adrien Gois. They also seem to have trained as goldsmiths under "Rontiers" (who may be Alexandre Roëttiers de Montaleau, goldsmith and et medalist, who died relatively young in 1808). Their younger brothers Nikolaus Adelrich Kuriger (Einsiedeln 1797–1820 Paris) and Josef Benedikt Kuriger (Einsiedeln 1798–1816?) were also wax sculptors.

Ildefons Curiger (Kuriger), wax modeller, etcher, draughtsman, painter and sculptor, was born in Einsiedeln 1732 and died around 1834 in Vienna. The Schweizerisches Künstler-Lexikon says he was the eldest and most talented of Joseph Benedikt Curiger's sons, from whom he received his first lessons in drawing and wax modelling. The works of his uncle Joseph Anton Couriguier. stimulated his innate artistic instinct even more. He made wax portraits (The Swiss National Museum owns a wax portrait (LM-70643) attributed to Ildefons, "Portrait of a lady", probably made in Einsiedeln c. 1830), bas-reliefs, etc. in coloured wax with extraordinary skill and kindness in a witty and lively manner. The authors mysteriously add that "He also made hundreds of artistic pranks." He first worked in Zurich until he acquired the travel money to go to Vienna, where he attended the academy; then in Einsiedeln until about 1833, later returning to Vienna, where he is said to have died in the invalids' hospital. The Einsiedeln monastery owns the following paintings by him: St. Emilian; Peter Nolasco; The Martyrdom of St. Ignatius, St. Johann Baptist preaching; the sketches for the altarpieces in Galgenen; in terracotta : Christmas; The Last Supper; The Washing of the Feet; The Coronation after Titian; The Carrying of the Cross; The Holy Family; Three Kings and many smaller works; in wax: Constantine before the Apparition of the Cross. He is praised for his fruitful and genuinely artistic invention. His portrait, painted by Heinrich Corrodi in 1803, in the abbey's picture cabinet, shows a brilliant artist's head.

Josef Benedikt Kuriger's brother was Joseph Anton Couriguier (born 6 June 1750 in Einsiedeln, died 1830 in Paris), who was a modeller and wax portraitist, the first son of goldsmith Augustin Mathias Kuriger. His father wanted him to become a goldsmith and trained him in drawing and modelling. He was recommended at age 17 by Johann Karl von Hedlinger to Joseph-Charles Roettiers, the royal goldsmith and medallist in Paris, where Couriguier trained for four years. Couriguier returned briefly to Switzerland in 1772 before traveling through Corsica and Toulon, ultimately settling in Paris in 1784. The Schweizerisches künstler-lexikon says he was renowned for his skill in wax portraiture, quickly gained recognition after completing a wax portrait of the Duke of Orleans (c. 1768) and later created a highly praised likeness of the first consul Bonaparte. Couriguier was known for capturing his subjects with ease, often while they dined or played games. The portrait of the Duke of Orleans may be the one that inspired Franz Gabriel Fiesinger when he engraved a portrait (or several portraits) of "Louis Philippe II, Duke of Orléans, "d'après le Modèle en cire fait par Mr Couriguer, 1789" (after the wax model made by Mr Couriguer) Lami mentions a portrait of Bonaparte (an VIII, or end of 1799 and 1800). Archives alsaciennes mentions it as a "wax portrait of Napoléon, Premier Consul", and adds a portrait of him as Emperor (1804 or later). Joseph Anton Couriguier also made a multicolored wax portrait depicting Lancelot Turpin de Crissé sitting at a table, c.1785 (the military man, not his painter son and grandson).

The Swiss National Museum owns a coloured wax portrait of a gentleman in profile attributed to Joseph Anton (LM-70641), c. 1810, probably made in Einsiedeln : it could just as well be by Joseph-Benoist). He also made a wax portrait of the opera singer Pierre-Jean Garat, c. 1795 Notable works in Switzerland also include a few religious sculptures.

A "citizen Courigner" (Joseph Anton, no doubt) had an advertisement published in Le Moniteur Universel on 29 August 1793: " I would ask you to announce in your paper that Citizen Courigner, who modelled in bas relief the portrait of Marie-Anne-Charlotte Corday, the only portrait made from life, has also just modelled that of Marat, the People's friend. – His home is rue de l'ancienne Comédie Française, no. 304, near the Bussy crossroads." He published another advertisement in the same paper on 9 November 1801 : "Citizen Couriguer, sculptor, author of the portrait of the first consul, made according to nature and in medallions, both coloured natural and in different costumes, as well as in bronze, white and terracotta, has the honour of informing the public that he had previously specially entrusted citizen Talochon with the delivery; but that from this day on, it will also be possible to obtain them at his residence, Cour du Commerce, fauxbourg Saint-Germain, n° 19. He is going to produce some incessantly reduced to the point of being able to be set on rings and pins, and he warns that he has not made and will not cast any plaster." This is confirmed by Nouveaux mélanges d'archéologie: "However, I saw him again in 1820, with his hair all white, but still wielding his fine ébauchoirs, which knew how to execute charming portraits that were sometimes smaller than a fingernail."

Joseph Anton Couriguier was also a medalist. The Musée Carnavalet has two medals by him, one of Henri Irminger, vainqueur de la Bastille, 1794 and the other one for the birth of duc de Bordeaux on September 29, 1820 (a collaboration with Jean-Charles Cahier, 1772–1857, goldsmith). The National Portrait Gallery, London houses a wax portrait of John Nash by Joseph Anton Couriguer, c.1820–1825 (NPG 2778). He executed the reverse side of the medal commemorating the death of Sir John Moore at Corunna, 1809 for James Mudie's Series of National Medals. "Archives alsaciennes" as well as Stanislas Lami also attribute to Joseph-Anton a small bronze medallion of Mme Roland (Cabinet des Estampes, untraced).

== Literature ==
- Adrian Christoph Suter: Die anatomischen Reliefdarstellungen des Einsiedler Kleinkünstlers J. B. Kuriger, unpublished dissertation at the Medizinhistorisches Institut der Universitat Bern, 1986.
