= Johann Baptist Babel =

Swiss sculptor (1716–1799)

Johann Baptist Babel (25 June 1716 – 9 February 1799) was the preeminent sculptor of Baroque era Switzerland. Active mainly in Central Switzerland, he enjoyed an uncommonly long productive period that spanned the transitions from Late Baroque to Rococo and then to Neoclassicism.

== Life ==
Babel was the fourth son of a wealthy court clerk in Pfronten-Ried near Füssen in the Prince-Bishopric of Augsburg (now Bavaria, Germany). After training with local sculptors, probably his cousin Johann Peter Heel (1696–1767), Babel travelled in Austria as a wandering journeyman, learning wood and stone sculpting techniques. He probably spent time in Bohemia and with Joseph Päbel (1683–1742), another distantly related sculptor, in St. Pölten. Although this is not documented, similarities in style and composition make it likely that he also trained in stucco with Diego Francesco Carloni between 1734 and 1740.

He is first recorded as a master sculptor in 1742 in Mimmenhausen. In 1746 he settled in Einsiedeln, Schwyz, where he married Katharina Willi and served as court sculptor to Prince-Abbot Nikolaus II. Imfeld until 1754. At Einsiedeln Abbey, Babel created a cycle of sculptures that were to outshine all of his later work. The fame they brought him made him sought after by clients from all over Central Switzerland after 1754. On account of his preeminence as a sculptor, he was admitted to the Einsiedeln Guild in 1777.

Babel remained active as a sculptor into high age, and was probably the teacher of Joseph Anton and Joseph Benedikt Curiger and Joseph Anton Janser. About a year before his death in 1799, he had to witness the invading French troops vandalizing a great number of his sculptures on 3 May 1798. The political and cultural upheavals after his death prevented him from having a substantial artistic following.

== Works ==
Babel's works comprise about 270 objects related to 118 attested commissions, mostly sacral art. They include stone and stucco sculptures of saints and angels, mostly for church altars, models for reliquaries and a few secular sculptures for fountains or gardens.

His principal and earliest work is the statuary decoration of Einsiedeln Abbey. The choir sculptures (1746–47) elaborately illustrate the death of Christ and display an uncommonly rich variation in clothing forms, influenced by the work of Heel and Carloni. After 1750, Babel increasingly used Rococo elements, beginning with the Allegories on the Einsiedeln main altar (1749–1751), which made him a pioneer of this style in Switzerland. The stone statues on the abbey's main square (1749–1751) illustrate the progression from late Baroque forms, as seen in the Emperor statues, to the more Rococo-like expressive gestures in the allegorical sculptures.

Most of Babel's works were small- or medium-sized altar figurines in polished white basswood. The main work of the middle period of his life are the side altars of Our Lady's Chapel in Oberarth (1764–67), considered the most valued Rococo furnishings in Central Switzerland. These furnishings, and those in the palace chapel of Hilfikon illustrate Babel's principal accomplishment: the transformation of Late Baroque templates into a more controlled, constrained and comprehensive form.

In 1772–75, Babel created the facade, interior and fountain sculptures for the newly built Neoclassical St. Ursen Cathedral of Solothurn. His concessions to the emerging Neoclassicist style remained reluctant, however. His last major work, the 1794 statue of John of Nepomuk on the Devils's Bridge in Egg (Einsiedeln), based on a 1760 bozzetto, illustrates his unwillingness to fully adapt to the new style.

== Bibliography ==
- Felder, Peter (1970). Gesellschaft für Schweizerische Kunstgeschichte (ed.). Johann Baptist Babel 1716-1799. Ein Meister der schweizerischen Barockplastik. Beiträge zur Kunstgeschichte der Schweiz. Basel: Birkhäuser. ISBN 3-7643-0521-5.
- Johann Baptist Babel in the German National Library catalogue
