= Étienne-Pierre-Adrien Gois =

French sculptor

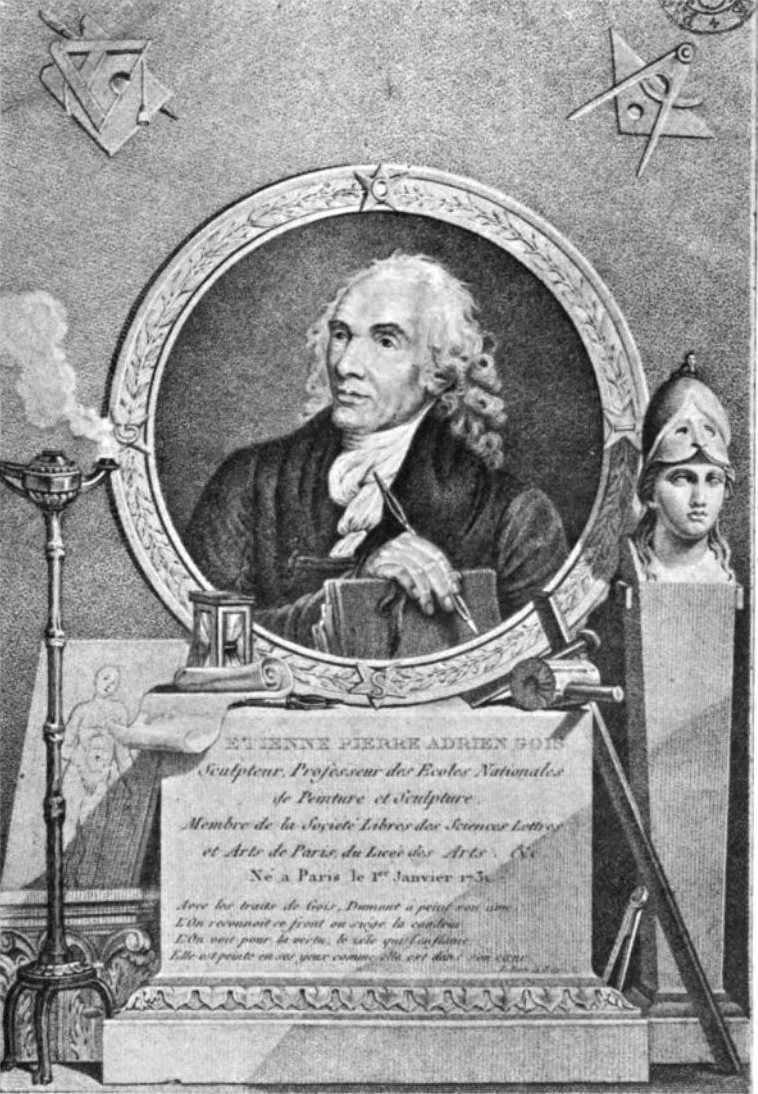
Portrait of Étienne-Pierre-Adrien Gois, a.k.a. Gois the Elder (1731-1823), French sculptor by unknown artist (illegible)

Étienne-Pierre-Adrien Gois, also Étienne Gois le père, (1 January 1731 – 3 February 1823) was a French sculptor.

== Biography ==
Gois initially studied under Étienne Jeaurat, then went into the workshop of Michelangelo Slodtz. He won the first grand prize for sculpture in 1757, on a bas-relief with the subject Tullie faisant enlever les morts. The prize money allowed Gois to travel to Rome. At the end of his stay at Palazzo Mancini, he executed a bust of la Douleur (Pain), a work that was presented three years later at the Paris Salon to great success.

Returning from Rome where he had fruitful studies, on 26 October 1765, he became an associate of the Académie royale de peinture et de sculpture, graduating on 23 February 1770. On 27 July 1776 the academy appointed Gois assistant professor. He was then appointed Professor on 7 July 1781, replacing Louis-Jean-François Lagrenée (the Elder). In 1788 he gave the academy a model he carefully executed of a flayed horse. He trained his son Edme-François-Étienne Gois who also became a sculptor. Among his students was also Josef Benedikt Kuriger.
