= Five guineas (British coin) =

Formerly used British coin

The Five Guinea was a machine-struck gold coin produced from 1668 to 1753. Measuring 37 millimetres (1.5 in) in diameter and weighing between 41–42 grams (1.3–1.4 ozt), it was the largest regularly produced gold coin in Britain. Although the coin is commonly known as the "Five guinea" piece, during the 17th and 18th centuries it was also known as a Five-pound piece, as the guinea was originally worth twenty shillings (i.e. a pound) – until its value was fixed at twenty-one shillings by a Royal Proclamation in 1717 the value fluctuated rather in the way that bullion coins do today. The coin was then fixed at a value of £5 5s., 5 1/4 pounds.

This denomination shows the year of striking on the reverse; but also the edge inscription DECUS ET TUTAMEN ANNO REGNI – An ornament and a safeguard, in the year of the reign... – is followed by the regnal year of the monarch, in Latin words. In the case of Charles II, the regnal year is calculated from the execution of Charles I, so 1668 is ANNO REGNI VICESIMO, the twentieth year of the reign. The edge inscription was put on the coin before the other two sides were struck – in the early years the blanks were cut out from a strip of gold which had been produced by horse power, then the blanks were sent to have the edge inscriptions impressed by a secret process devised by one Pierre Blondeau, a former engineer from the Paris mint who jealously guarded his methods. The blanks were then returned to the mint to have the obverse and reverse struck in a hand-operated press. Samuel Pepys gives a long and detailed description of the rolling, cutting, and striking of the blanks in his diary entry for 19 May 1663.

Many of the coins produced up to 1699 have an elephant and castle beneath the monarch's head, indicating that the gold was provided by the Africa Company. Coins of 1703 (Queen Anne ANNO REGNI SECVNDO) have the word VIGO under the Queen's head, indicating that the gold was captured from Spanish galleons in the Battle of Vigo Bay in October 1702, but very few of these coins now remain in existence and are considered extremely valuable by collectors (an example sold for £845,000 at a New York auction in January 2019)

== Charles II ==
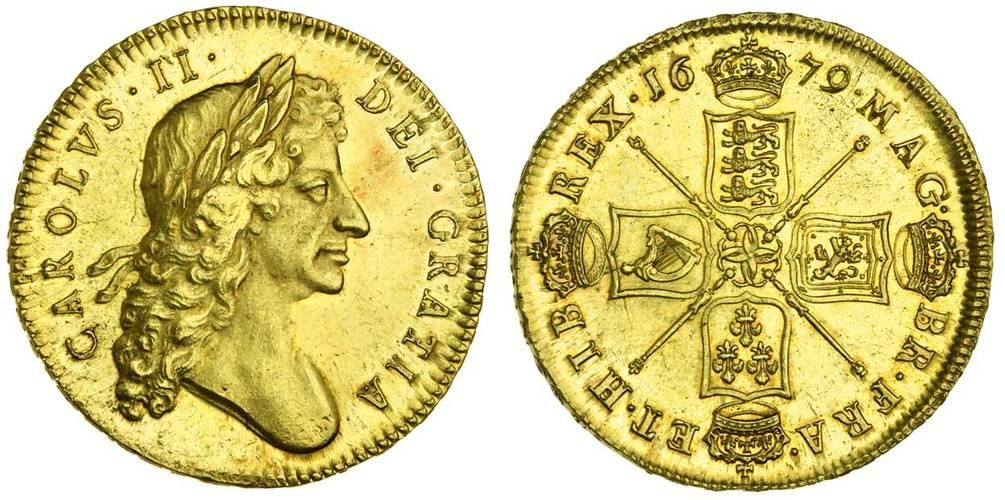
Charles II, Five Guinea, 1679. Courtesy Spink and Son Ltd.

The Five Guinea coin was produced in each year of Charles II's reign from 1668 to 1684; before 1670 the weight limits were 41-42 grams, afterwards 41.0–41.8 grams. The obverse and reverse of this coin were designed by John Roettier (1631–c.1700). The obverse showed a fine right-facing bust of the king wearing a laurel wreath, surrounded by the legend CAROLVS II DEI GRATIA, while the reverse showed four crowned cruciform shields bearing the arms of England, Scotland, France, and Ireland, between which were four sceptres, and in the centre were four interlinked "C"s, surrounded by the inscription MAG BR FRA ET HIB REX date.

The regnal years used in this reign's coin issue were:

1668:	VICESIMO	1674:	VICESIMO SEXTO	1680:	TRICESIMO SECVNDO
1669:	VICESIMO PRIMO	1675:	VICESIMO SEPTIMO	1681:	TRICESIMO TERTIO
1670:	VICESIMO SECVNDO	1676:	VICESIMO OCTAVO	1682:	TRICESIMO QVARTO
1671:	VICESIMO TERTIO	1677:	VICESIMO NONO	1683:	TRICESIMO QVINTO
1672:	VICESIMO QVARTO	1678:	TRICESIMO	1684:	TRICESIMO SEXTO
1673:	VICESIMO QVINTO	1679:	TRICESIMO PRIMO

== James II ==
John Roettiers continued to design the dies for this denomination in the reign of King James II. In this reign, the weight of the coins varied between 41.5 and 42.0 grams. The king's head faces left in this reign, and is surrounded by the inscription IACOBUS II DEI GRATIA, while the obverse is the same as in Charles II's reign except for omitting the interlinked "C"s in the centre of the coin.

The regnal years for this reign are:

1686:	SECVNDO	1687:	TERTIO	1688:	QVARTO

== Mary II and William III ==
With the removal of James II in the Glorious Revolution of 1688, his daughter Mary, and her husband Prince William of Orange ruled jointly by agreement as co-monarchs. Their heads appear conjoined on the five guinea piece in Roman style, with William's head uppermost, with the legend GVLIELMVS ET MARIA DEI GRATIA. In a departure from the previous reigns the reverse featured a totally new design of a large crowned shield which bore the arms of France in the first quarter, of Scotland in the second quarter, of Ireland in the third quarter, and of England in the fourth quarter, the whole ensemble having a small shield in the centre bearing the rampant lion of Nassau; the legend on the obverse read MAG BR FR ET HIB REX ET REGINA date. The weight tolerance of the coin in this reign was 41.5–41.8 grams. The five guinea coin of this reign was probably the work of James and/or Norbert Roettier.

The regnal years for this joint reign are:

1691:	TERTIO	1692:	QVARTO	1693:	QVINTO (one extant)	1694:	SEXTO

== William III ==
Following the death of Queen Mary II from smallpox in 1694, William continued to reign as William III, with his regnal years continuing to date from 1688. Five guinea coins were only produced in the last three years of his sole reign, the design probably being the work of Johann Crocker, also known as John Croker, since James Roettier had died in 1698 and his brother Norbert had left somewhat under a cloud for Paris in 1695.

The coins of William III's reign weighed 41.6–41.7 grams. William's head faces right on his coins, with the legend GVLIELMVS III DEI GRATIA, while the reverse design of William and Mary's reign was judged to be unsuccessful, so the design reverted to that used by Charles II and James II, but with a small shield with the lion of Nassau in the centre, with the legend MAG BR FRA ET HIB REX date.

The regnal years for this reign are:

1699:	UNDECIMO	1700:	DVODECIMO	1701:	DECIMO TERTIO

== Anne ==
The reign of Queen Anne (1702–1714) began with one of the most valuable and exotic of all British coins, the "Vigo" five guinea piece of 1703, which was struck from gold captured from Spanish galleons at the Battle of Vigo Bay in October 1702. A Royal Warrant of 10 February 1703 (1702 Old Style) authorised the word "VIGO" be placed "under our effigies, which inscription we intend as a mark of distinction from the rest of our gold and silver moneys to continue to posterity the remembrance of that glorious action". At a sale of "Vigo" pieces in October 1992 the auctioneers, Glendining, noted that certainly fewer than twenty Vigo five guinea pieces survive.

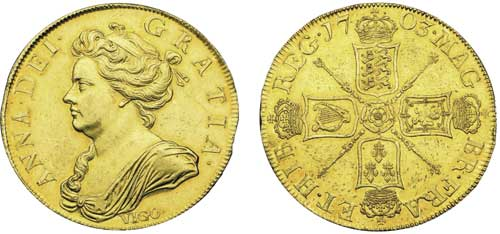
Anne, Five Guineas, 1703 VIGO, struck from bullion captured from the Spanish fleet at Vigo Bay. Courtesy of Spink and Son Ltd.

Queen Anne five guineas were subsequently produced in 1705, 1706, 1709, 1711, 1713 and 1714. The obverse of the coin throughout her reign shows the left-facing effigy of the queen, with the legend ANNA DEI GRATIA.The general design of the reverse was similar to that of the previous reign, with four crowned cruciform shields bearing the arms of England, Scotland, Ireland, and France, separated by sceptres and with a central rose, and the legend MAG BRI FR ET HIB REG date. However, the union of England and Scotland necessitated a change in the design of the arms on the shield in 1706 (although the actual union took place on 1 May 1707, just over a month after the start of the year, the bill for the Act of Union received the Royal Assent on 6 March 1707 (that is, still in 1706 by the old-style calendar)), therefore coins dated 1706 appear with both reverses. The order of the arms appearing on the cruciform shields until 1706 was England, then Scotland, then France, then Ireland. With the union, the English and Scottish arms appear conjoined on one shield, with the left half being the English arms and the right half being the Scottish arms, and the order of arms appearing on the shields becomes England+Scotland, France, England+Scotland, Ireland. In 1706, with the Union, the central rose on the reverse was replaced by the Star of the Order of the Garter.

The regnal years for this reign are:

1703:	SECVNDO	1705:	QVARTO	1706:	QVINTO	1709:	OCTAVO
1711:	DECIMO	1713:	DVODECIMO	1714:	DECIMO TERTIO

== George I ==
George I's Five Guinea coins were only struck in 1716, 1717, 1720, and 1726, and they bear his abbreviated Hanoverian titles in addition to the usual British, French, and Irish title. The obverse bears a right-facing portrait of the king with the legend GEORGIVS D G M BR FR ET HIB REX F D. The reverse follows the same general design as before, except the order of the shields is England+Scotland, France, Ireland, and Hanover, with the legend BRVN ET L DVX S R I A TH ET EL date – Duke of Brunswick and Lueneburg, Arch-Treasurer and Elector of the Holy Roman Empire. The coins of this reign weighed 41.7–41.8 grams. The value of the guinea had fluctuated over the years from twenty to thirty shillings (in 1694), and back down to twenty one shillings and sixpence by the start of George's reign. A Royal Proclamation of December 1717 fixed the value of the guinea at twenty one shillings.

The regnal years for this reign are:

1716:	SECVNDO	1717:	TERTIO	1720:	SEXTO	1726:	DECIMO TERTIO

== George II ==
George II's Five Guinea pieces mark the last of the denomination. The series began in 1729, and was also struck in 1731, 1735, 1738, 1741, 1746, 1748, and for the last time in 1753. The coins weighed 41.8–42.0 grams. Some of the 1729 coins bear the initials EIC under the king's head, indicating the gold was supplied by the East India Company, while the 1746 coins have LIMA under the head, indicating the gold was obtained during Admiral Anson's circumnavigation of the world (though the use of LIMA is something of a mystery, as there is no known connection with Peru).

The obverse has a left-facing bust of the king (with an older head from 1746), with the legend GEORGIVS II DEI GRATIA, while the reverse features a single large crowned shield with the quarters containing the arms of England+Scotland, France, Hanover, and Ireland, and the legend M B F ET H REX F D B ET L D S R I A T ET E —King of Great Britain, France and Ireland, Defender of the Faith, Duke of Brunswick and Lueneburg, Arch-Treasurer and Elector of the Holy Roman Empire.

The regnal years for this reign are:

1729:	TERTIO	1731:	QVARTO	1735:	OCTAVO	1738:	DVODECIMO
1741:	DECIMO QVARTO	1746:	DECIMO NONO	1748:	VICESIMO SECVNDO	1753:	VICESIMO SEXTO

== See also ==
- British coinage
