= Pierre-Jean Garat =

French opera singer

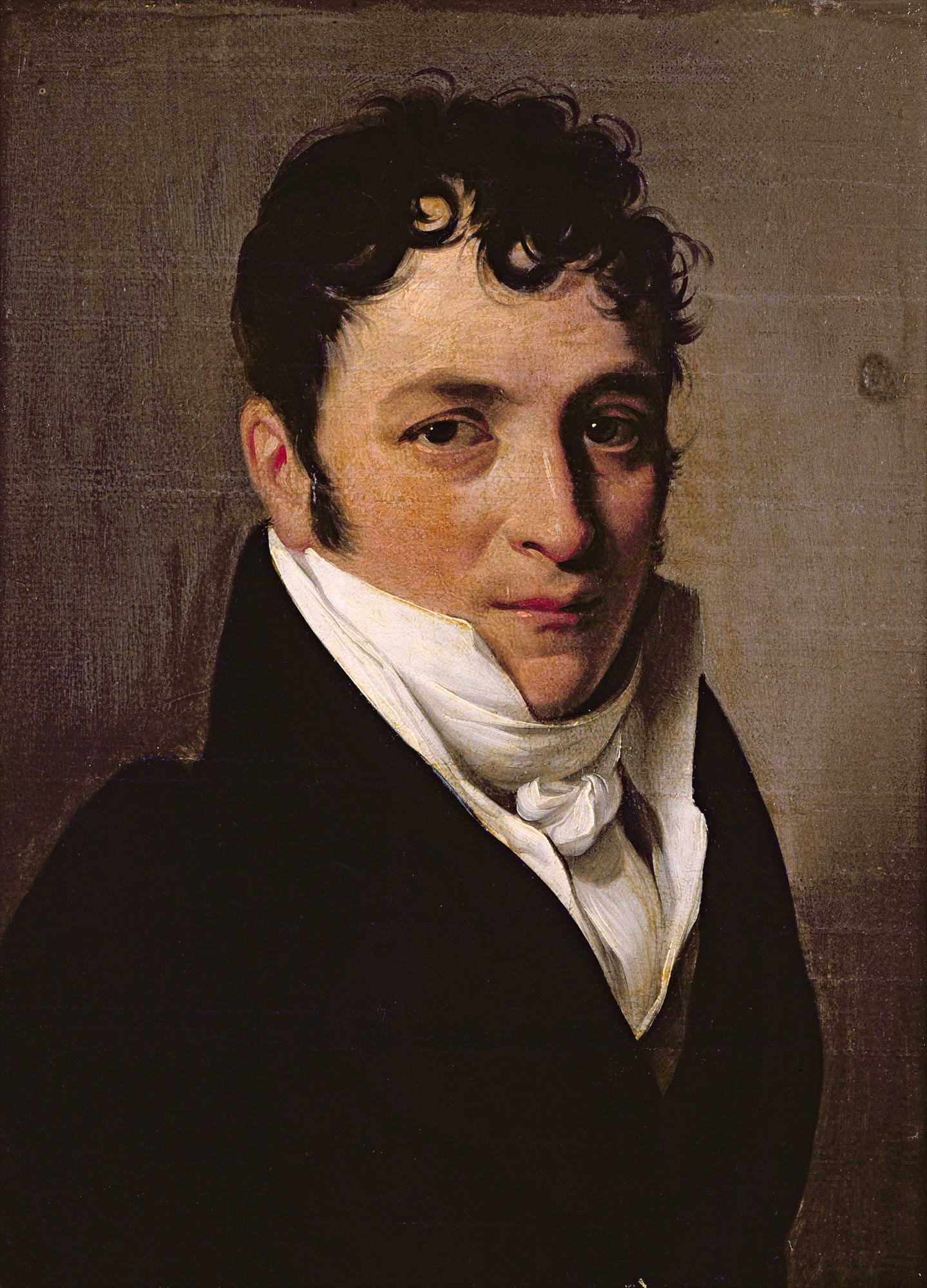
Pierre-Jean Garat c. 1800

Pierre-Jean Garat (25 April 1764 – 1 March 1823) was a French Basque singer and nephew of Dominique Joseph Garat. He was born in Ustaritz.

Garat devoted himself from an early age to the cultivation of his musical talents. Because he professed a distaste for the legal profession, which his father wished him to pursue, he was deprived of his allowance, but through the patronage of a friend he obtained the office of secretary to Comte d'Artois, and was afterwards engaged to give musical lessons to the queen of France.

At the beginning of the Revolution he accompanied Rode to England, where the two musicians appeared together in concerts. He returned to Paris in 1794. After the Revolution he became a professional singer and was thrown into prison for a song he composed about the misfortunes of the royal family.

On regaining his liberty Garat went to Hamburg, where he at once achieved extraordinary success. By his subsequent appearances in Paris, and his visits to Italy, Spain, Germany and Russia, he made for himself a reputation as a singer unequalled by any other of his own time. In addition, he became a professor of singing for the Conservatoire de Musique, and composed several songs. He was known as a keen partisan of Gluck in opposition to Handel.

Garat died on 1 March 1823 in Paris.

He had his wax portrait done by Joseph Anton Curiger c. 1795.

== French bibliography ==
- Natalie Morel-Borotra, « Le chant et l’identification culturelle des Basques (1800–1850) », Lapurdum, n^{o} 5, 2000, pp. 351–381 online.
- Joann Élart, « Circulation des quatre symphonies œuvre VII de Johann Franz Xaver Sterkel de l'Allemagne à Rouen : un itinéraire singulier du goût musical entre 1770 et 1825 », Studien zu den deutsch-französischen Musikbeziehungen im 18. und 19. Jahrhundert, bericht über die erste gemeinsame Jahrestagung der Gesellschaft für Musikforschung und der Société française de musicologie Saarbrücken 1999, Hildesheim, Georg Olms Verlag, 2002, pp. 266–281.
- Joann Élart et Patrick Taïeb, « La Complainte du Troubadour de Pierre-Jean Garat (1762–1823) », Les Orages, n° 2, L'imaginaire du héros, Besançon, Apocope, mai 2003, pp. 137–168 online.
- Natalie Morel-Borotra, « Un élève de Franz Beck à Bordeaux. Quelques notes sur Pierre-Jean Garat », Lumières, n^{o} 2 (« Franz Beck, un musicien des Lumières », dir. Alain Ruiz), 2003, pp. 81–96.
- Natalie Morel-Borotra, « Comment Pierre-Jean Garat est devenu un chanteur basque : de l’Histoire au(x) mythe(s) », Lapurdum, n^{o} 9, 2004, pp. 159–179 online.
- Joann Élart, « La mobilité des musiciens et des répertoires : Punto, Garat et Rode aux concerts du Musée », in Patrick Taïeb, Natalie Morel-Borotra et Jean Gribenski (dir.), Le Musée de Bordeaux et la musique 1783–1793, Rouen, PURH, 2005, pp. 157–173.
- Joann Élart, « Les origines du concert public à Rouen à la fin de l'Ancien Régime », Revue de musicologie, n° 93/1, 2007, pp. 53–73.
