= Norbert Roettiers =

British medallist (1665 – 1727)

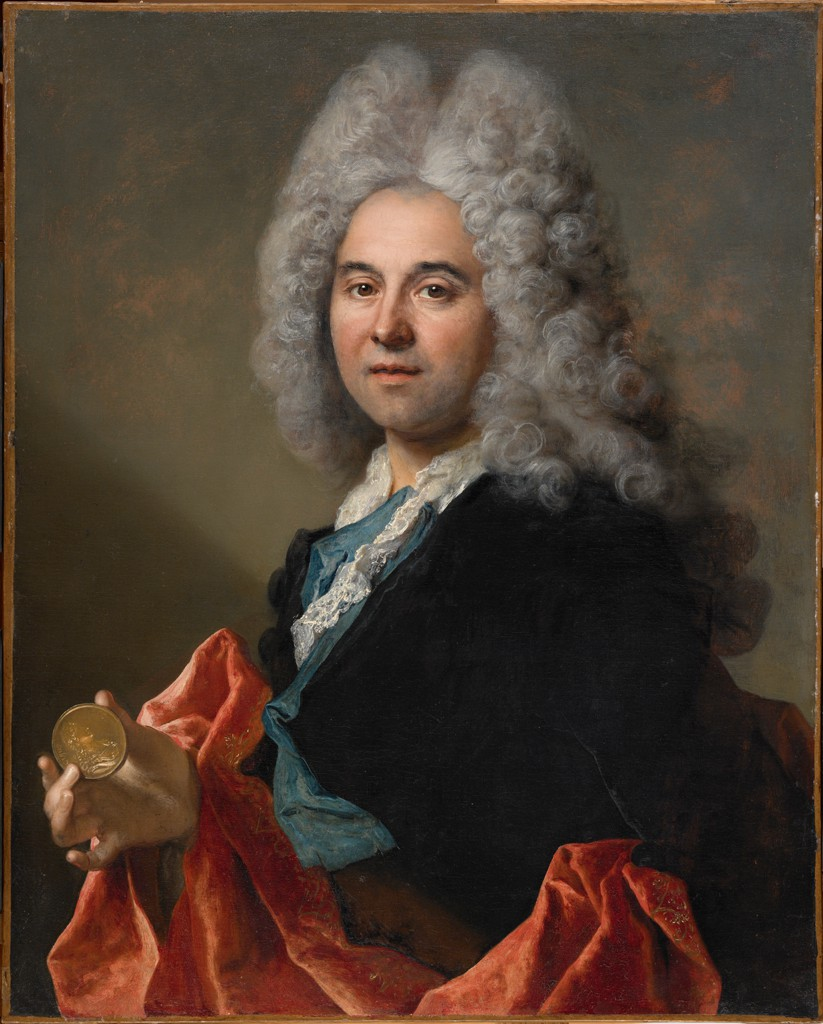
- Born: 1665; Antwerp, Brabant
- Died: 18 May 1727 (aged 61–62)
- Occupations: Engraver of currency and medals
- Children: Jacques
- Parent: John Roettiers

Norbert Roettiers (1665 – 18 May 1727) was a celebrated Flanders-born engraver of currency and medals in both England and France. With his elder brother James he was named Engraver-General to the British Royal Mint in 1695.

Roettiers was born in Antwerp, Spanish Netherlands, the third son of John Roettiers, and a member of an illustrious family of engravers, goldsmiths, and silversmiths, including his brother James Roettiers; cousin Joseph-Charles Roettiers; son Jacques Roettiers, also known as James; and grandson Jacques-Nicolas Roettiers.

He was employed in the British Royal Mint from about 1684 onwards, and in 1690 was officially the given post (together with his brother James) of assistant engraver. He was a strong Jacobite and left England around 1695 to attach himself to the Stuart court. He was later appointed engraver-general to the French mint, and died at his country seat in France.
