= Edme-François-Étienne Gois =

French sculptor

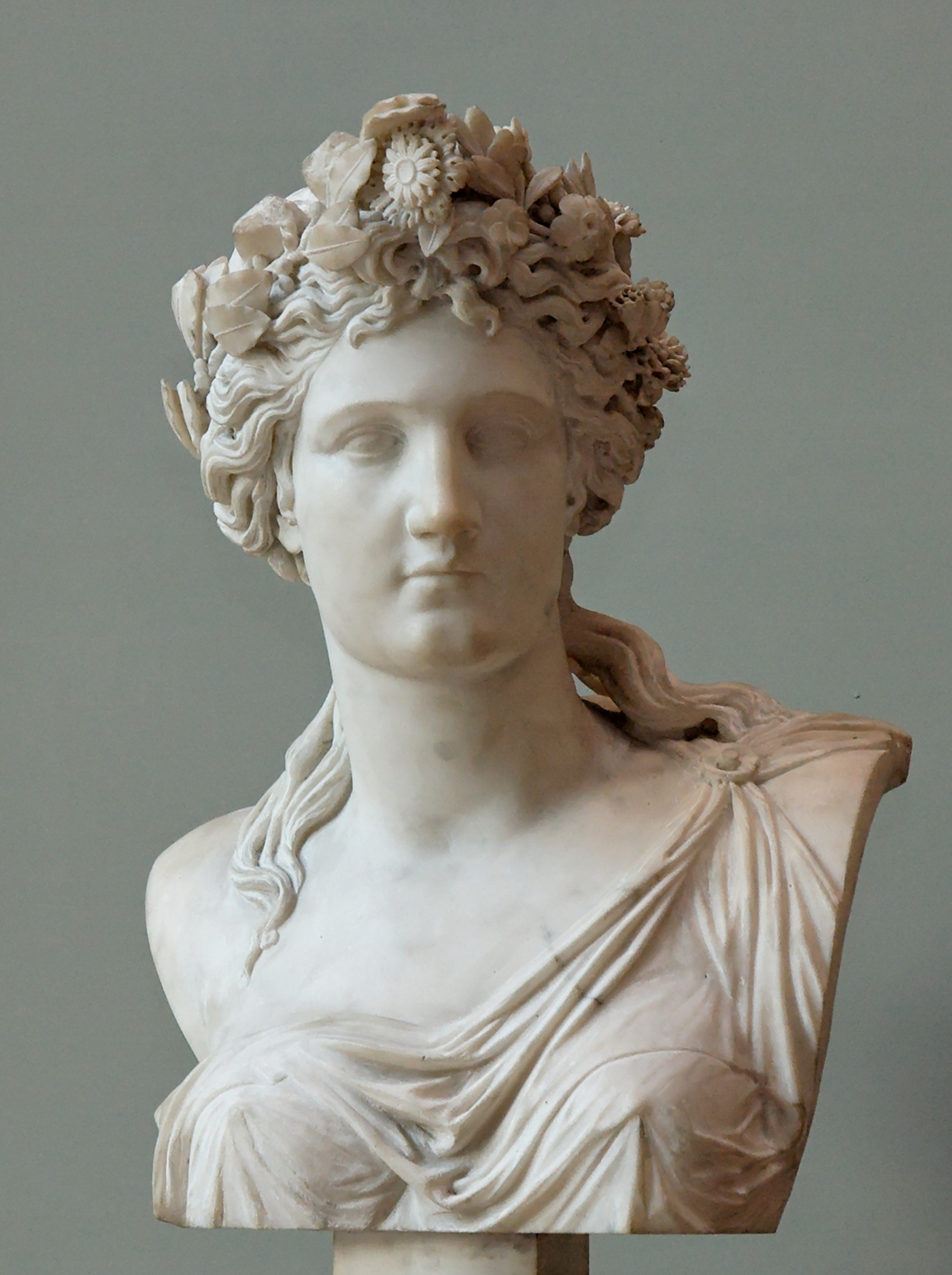
Corinne by Edme-François-Étienne Gois, representation of the eponymous character from the novel by Germaine de Staël, the Louvre, 1836

Edme-François-Étienne Gois, also Étienne Gois le fils, (1765–1836) was a French sculptor.

Born in Paris, Gois was the son of the sculptor Étienne-Pierre-Adrien Gois, with whom he initially trained. He then attended the École des Beaux-Arts, where he won the second prize in sculpture in 1788 and a first prize in 1791. The 1791 work was a depiction of Abimelech Taking Sarah. The first prize was originally awarded to Pierre-Charles Bridan. Recognising his achievements in the concours, Gois' fellow students wrote to the King, Louis XVI, to ask that another first prize be awarded. The King had Arnaud II de La Porte, intendant of the Civil List, write to the Academy stating that, finding the students’ petition justified, he requested that the Academy proceed with awarding the prize that had not been given in 1786 to Gois, as he had received the greatest number of votes after Bridan.
