= Joseph-Charles Roettiers =

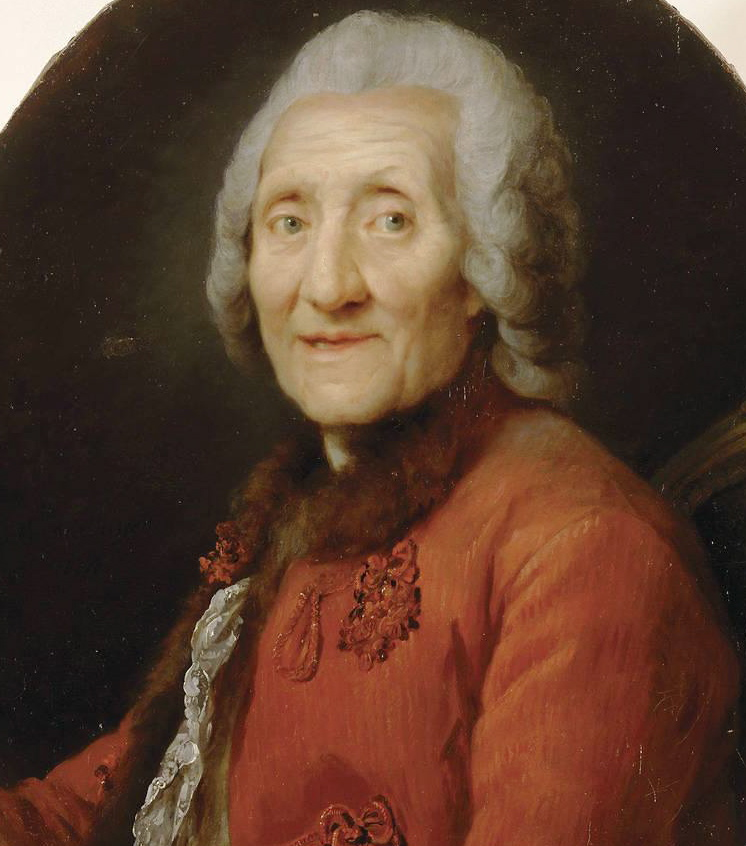
- Portrait by Anne Vallayer-Coster
- Born: 13 April 1691; Paris, France
- Died: 14 March 1779 (aged 87); Paris, France
- Children: Charles
- Parent: Joseph Roettiers

Joseph-Charles Roettiers (13 April 1691 – 14 March 1779) was a French engraver and medalist..

Roettiers was born in Paris to Joseph Roettiers (1635–1703). He was a member of the celebrated Roettiers family of engravers, medallists, silversmiths, and goldsmiths; Norbert Roettiers was his cousin, and Charles Norbert Roettiers was his son. In 1715, he obtained the title of Graveur des medailles du Roi and was appointed Engraver General at the Paris Mint in 1727.
