= Charles Norbert Roettiers =

French engraver and medallist

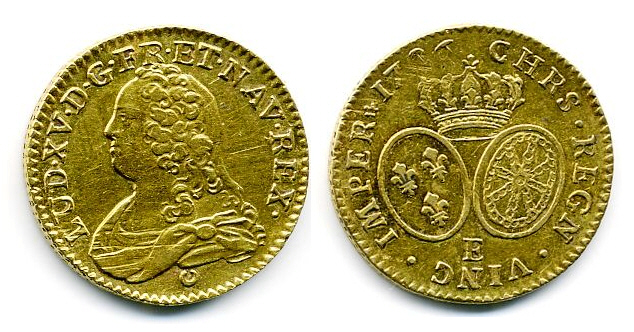
Louis d'or of Louis XV

Charles Norbert Roettiers (August 15, 1720 – November 19, 1772) was a French engraver and medallist.

Roettiers was born in Paris to Joseph-Charles Roettiers (April 13, 1691 – March 14, 1779), into the celebrated Roettier family of medallists, silversmiths, and goldsmiths. He served as engraver-general of the French mint (1753–1768), and graveur particulier de l'atelier monétaire de Paris until his death (1759–1772). He became a member of the Académie in 1764.
