= Jacques Roettiers =

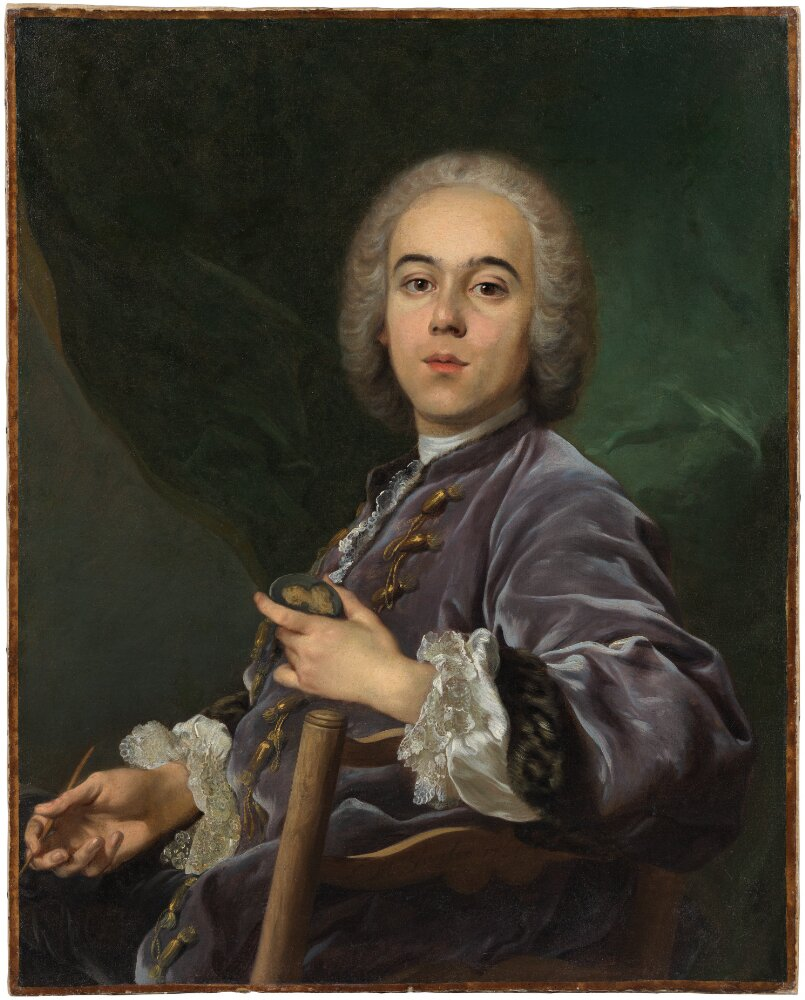
Portrait of Jacques Roettiers by Louis-Michel van Loo

Jacques Roettiers (20 August 1707 – 17 May 1784) was an engraver in England and France, and one of the most celebrated Parisian goldsmiths and silversmiths of his day.

Roettiers was born in Saint-Germain-en-Laye, near Paris, to Norbert Roettiers (1665–1727) and his wife Winifred Clarke, niece of John Churchill, Duke of Marlborough. As a Roettiers, he was born into a distinguished family of medallists, engravers, and goldsmiths. Roettiers studied drawing and sculpture at the Académie Royale de Peinture et de Sculpture, winning a prize to be pensionnaire du Roi at the French Academy in Rome. Instead he remained in Paris to learn medal-engraving and in 1732 moved to London. There he was appointed Engraver at the Royal Mint.

He returned to Paris in 1733, however, where he became a master and designed a whole service for Louis, Dauphin of France, the son of King Louis XV. In that same year, he married the 16-year-old daughter of Nicolas Besnier, goldsmith to the king. In 1736 he created perhaps his finest piece for Louis Henri, Duc de Bourbon (1692–1740): a Rococo silver surtout de table representing a hunting scene (now in the Louvre). When Besnier died in 1737, Roettiers took his position. His work proved highly fashionable, and a source of wealth and honors. In 1772 became a peer and a year later admitted into the Académie de peinture et de sculpture. He retired in 1774, and died in Paris in 1784.

Examples of Rottiers' work can be found in the Louvre and British Museum. His son Jacques-Nicolas Roettiers (1736–1788) was also a celebrated goldsmith and silversmith.
