= Joseph Roettiers =

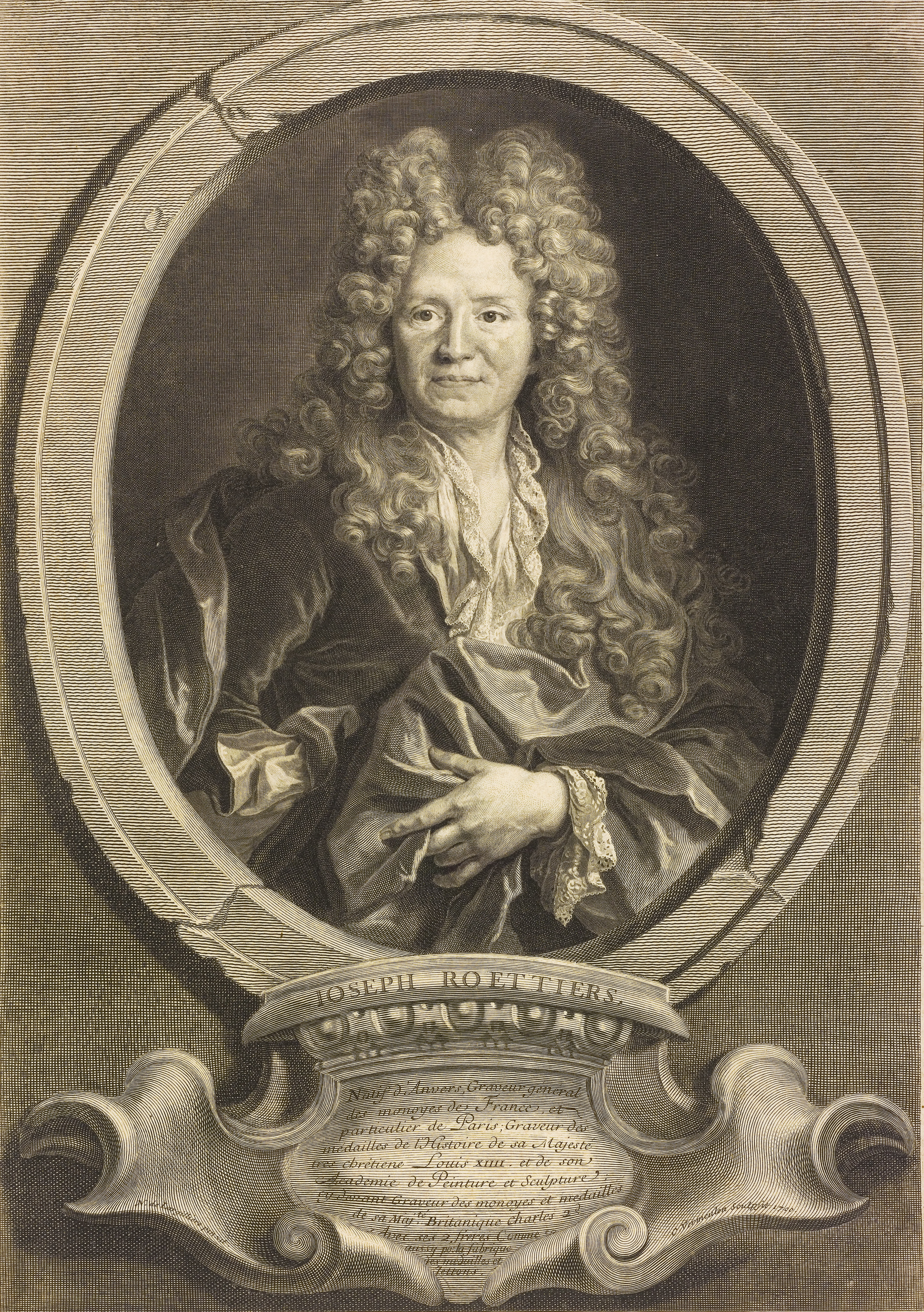

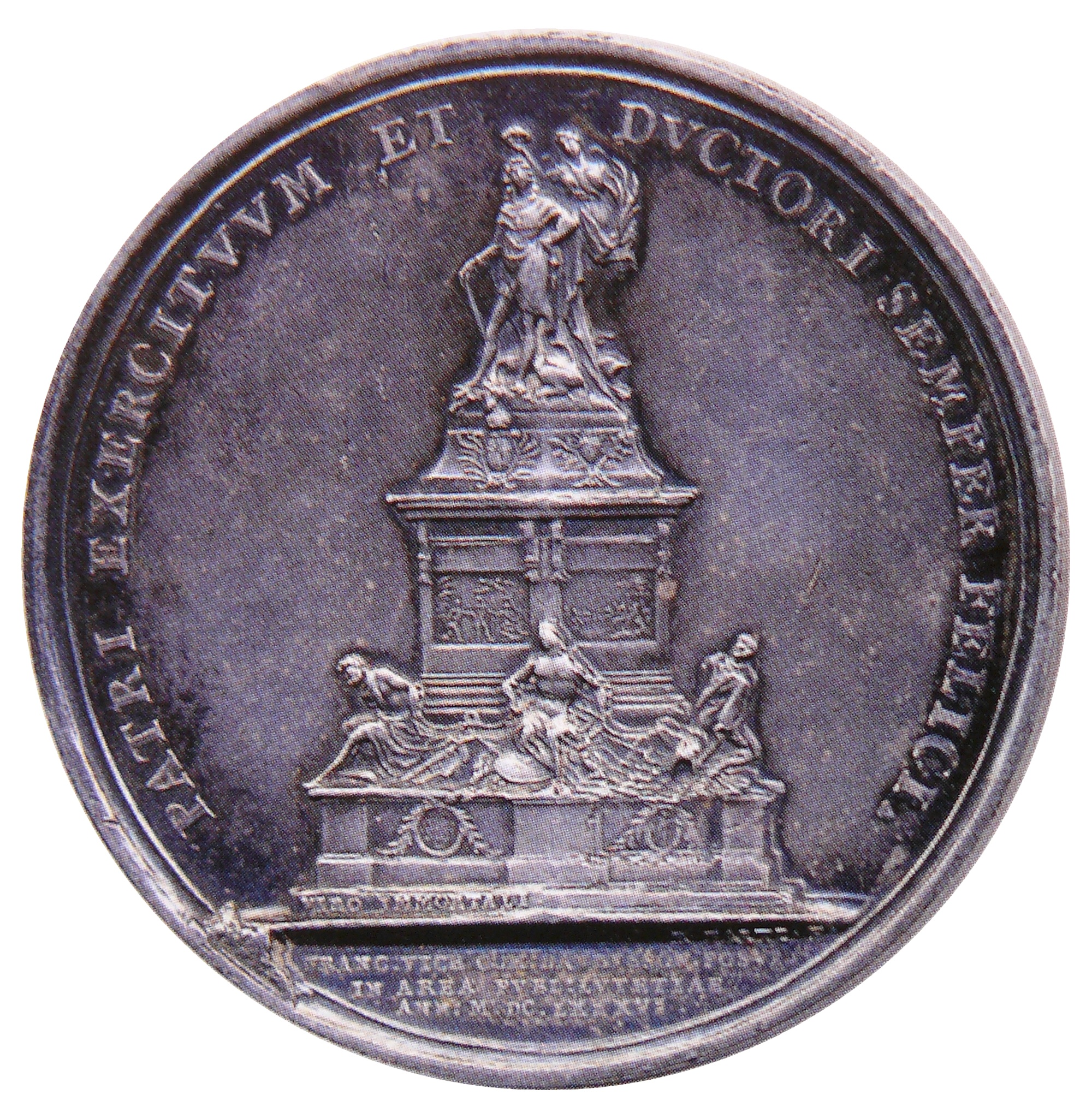
medallion by Joseph Roettiers, Obverse: Louis XIV, Reverse: inauguration of Martin Desjardins's statue of Louis XIV (now destroyed) in the Place des Victoires, Paris, 1686

Joseph Roettiers (1635–1703) was a Flemish medallist and engraver active in England and France. He was a prominent member of the celebrated Roettier family of goldsmiths, silversmiths, and engravers, which included numerous influential artists and craftsmen across Europe.

== Early life and family ==
Joseph Roettiers was born in 1635 into the distinguished Roettier family, known for their craftsmanship in engraving and metalwork. He was the son of Philip Roettiers, himself a skilled engraver. Joseph's brothers included John Roettiers (1631–1703) and Philip Roettiers (1640–1718), both accomplished medallists and engravers. He continued the family tradition, and his son, Joseph-Charles Roettiers (1693–1779), also became a prominent engraver and medallist in France.

== Career ==
Roettiers began his career in England, where he served as assistant engraver at the Royal Mint in the early 1670s. His work contributed to the production of coins and medals during the reign of King Charles II. Around 1682, he relocated to France, where he was appointed as Engraver-general, a prestigious position that put him in charge of engraving duties at the French mints.

From 1694 until his death in 1703, Roettiers held the post of graveur particulier (private engraver) at the Paris Mint. He was later named Premier graveur de l’Histoire en Médailles (First Engraver of the History in Medals), reflecting his significant contributions to medallic art.

Roettiers was one of the first artists to participate in the famous series of medals commissioned by Louis XIV, begun in 1680, designed to commemorate important events and achievements during the king’s reign. In this endeavor, he collaborated with notable artists such as Jean Mauger, Henri Roussel, and Michel Molart.

== Notable works ==
Among ' notable contributions are the finely engraved medals celebrating the victories and grand events of Louis XIV’s reign. These medals often featured allegorical and historical imagery, combining artistic skill with propagandistic purposes. Some of these works are housed in major collections, including the British Museum and the Metropolitan Museum of Art.

== Legacy ==
Roettiers is remembered as a key figure in the continuation of the artistic excellence of the Roettier family, influencing numismatic and medallic art in both England and France. His work marked a transition to more elaborate and historically-themed medals, which set standards for commemorative coinage and medallic portraits for decades.
