= John Roettiers =

English engraver and medallist (1631 – 1703)

- Born: 4 July 1631
- Died: 1703 (aged 71–72)
- Occupations: Engraver and medallist
- Children: James and Norbert

John Roettiers (4 July 1631 – 1703) was an English engraver and medallist.

Roettiers was the oldest son of Philip Roettiers, a goldsmith of Antwerp. He took up the profession of stonecutter and medallist, with his earliest known productions being dated 1658 and 1660. In 1661, Charles II of England invited Roettiers and his brother Joseph (and subsequently a third brother Philip) to join the British Royal Mint, and by 1662, Roettiers was one of the mint's chief engravers. He was aided by his two sons, James and Norbert. He produced many important coin and medal designs throughout the reign of Charles II, including a new Great Seal in 1666–1667. He also produced the official coronation medals of James II of England (1685) and William III and Mary II (1689). He died in 1703 and was buried in the Tower.

Roettiers was widely credited as one of the best engravers ever employed at the English mint. John Evelyn termed him "that excellent engraver... who emulates even the ancients in stone and metal" (Diary, 20 July 1678), and Samuel Pepys declared his medals to be "some of the finest pieces of work, in embossed work, that I ever did see in my life" (Diary, 26 March 1666).

John's brother, Joseph Roettiers, was Engraver-General at the Monnaie de Paris. His sons James Roettiers (1663–1698) and Norbert Roettiers (1665–1727) were also famed engravers and medallists both in England and in France.

== See also ==
- William Chaloner

== Bibliography ==
- Roettiers, John. Dictionary of National Biography. London: Smith, Elder & Co. 1885—1900.
- Fengler H., Girow G., Unger V. Dictionary of Numismatist / trans. with him. V.G. Arselyeva / resp. ed. V.M. Pothin . — 2nd, revised. and additional.. - M .: Radio and Communications, 1993. - 408 p. — ISBN 5-256-00317-8.
