= Jacques-Nicolas Roettiers =

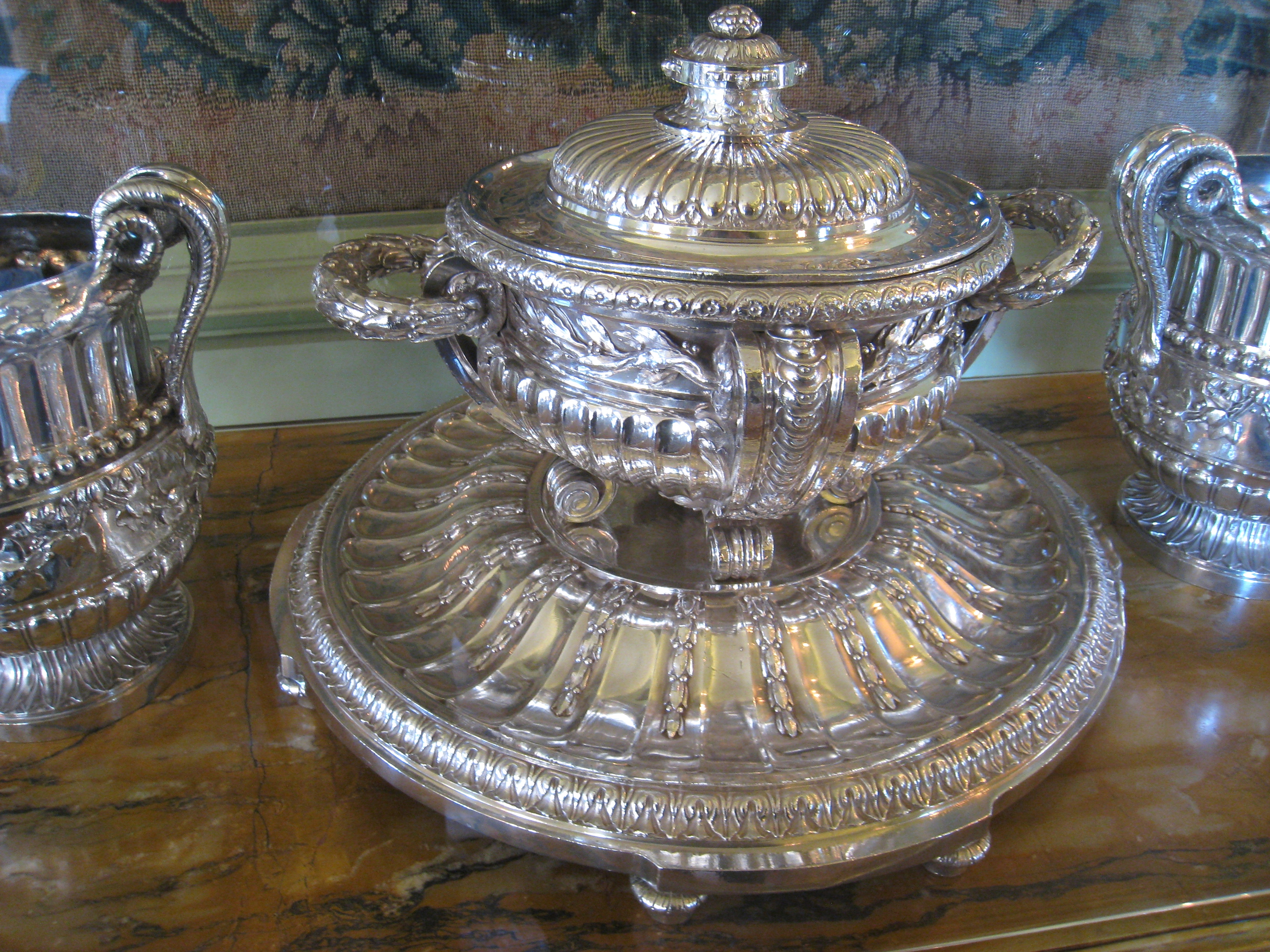
Pieces from the Orloff Service by Jacques-Nicolas Roettiers

Jacques-Nicolas Roettiers (1736–1788) was a Flemish goldsmith and silversmith active in Paris and, in concert with his father, said to be the most fashionable Parisian silversmith of his day.

Roettiers was the son of distinguished silversmith Jacques Roettiers, and descended from an illustrious line of goldsmiths, medallists, and engravers to the king since the 17th century. He became a master in 1765, and was active until 1777.

Today Roettiers is perhaps best known for the Orloff Service, 1770–71, created for Catherine II of Russia, portions of which are now preserved in Les Arts Décoratifs (Paris) and the Metropolitan Museum of Art (New York City).
