= Haselböck =

Haselböck is a surname. Notable people with the surname include:

- Hermine Haselböck (born 1967), Austrian opera singer
- Hans Haselböck (1928–2021), Austrian organist, composer, book author, academic teacher (father of Lukas and Martin)
- Lukas Haselböck (born 1972), Austrian composer, musicologist, and singer
- Martin Haselböck (born 1954), Austrian musical director
