= Hans Haselböck =

Austrian organist, composer, author and teacher (1928–2021)

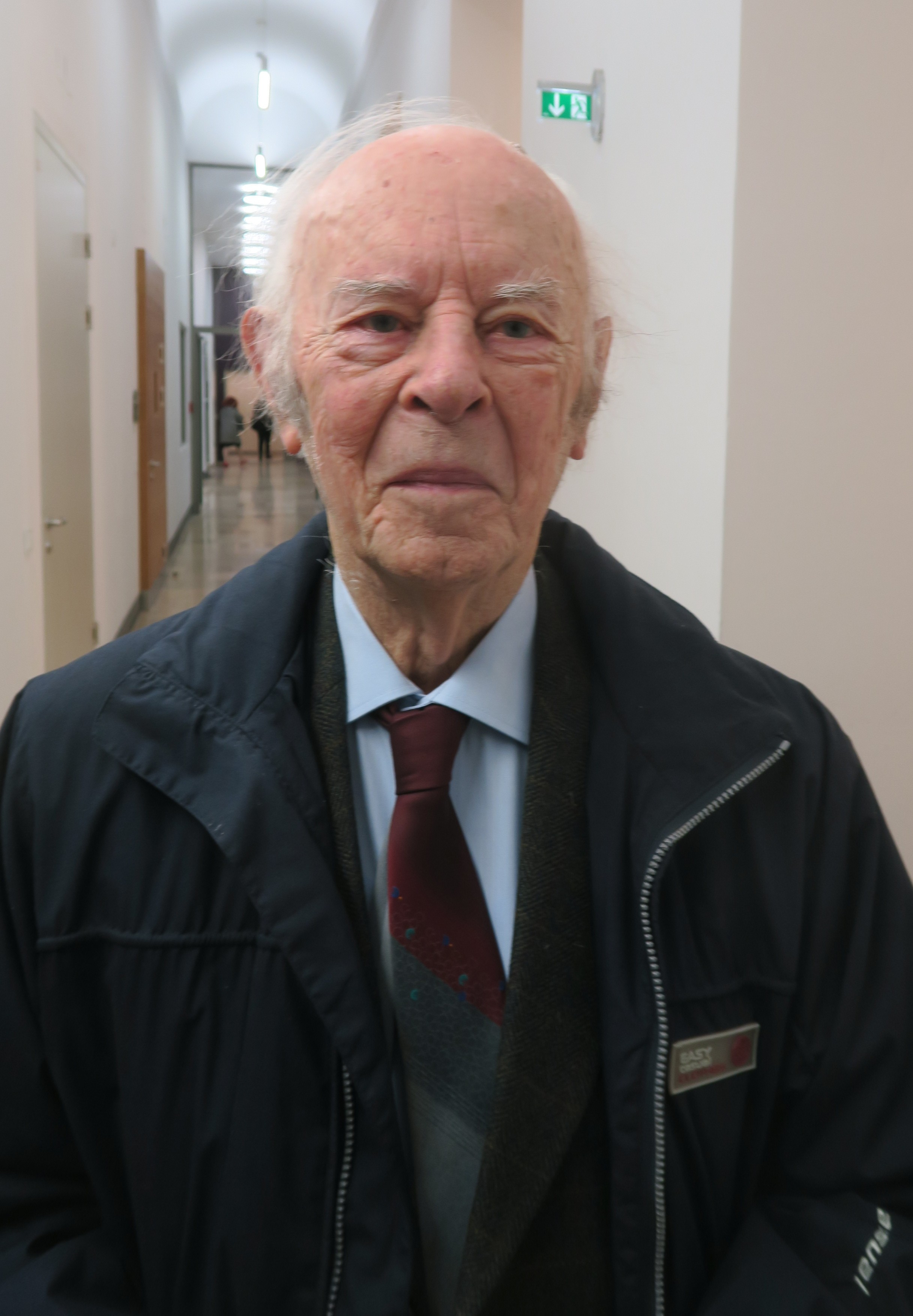
- Haselböck in 2018
- Born: July 26, 1928; Nesselstauden, First Austrian Republic
- Died: 20 October 2021 (aged 93); Vienna, Austria
- Occupations: Organist; composer; author; academic teacher

Johann Haselböck (26 July 1928 – 20 October 2021) was an Austrian organist, composer, author and academic teacher. He was organist at the Dominican Church, Vienna, for 65 years, and was professor of organ and improvisation at the Vienna Music Academy, where he later also served as head of the faculty of church music and as deputy rector. He gave organ concerts in Europe, North America, and the Near and Far East. Haselböck is regarded as a pioneer of Catholic church music in the German language after the Second Vatican Council.

== Biography ==
Haselböck was born in Nesselstauden, now part of Bergern im Dunkelsteinerwald. He attended the gymnasium in Krems, Lower Austria, achieving the Matura in 1947. He then studied organ and church music at both the Vienna Conservatory and the Vienna Music Academy, graduating in 1952. He also studied pedagogy of the Classics and German studies at the University of Vienna, where he was promoted to the doctorate in 1953.

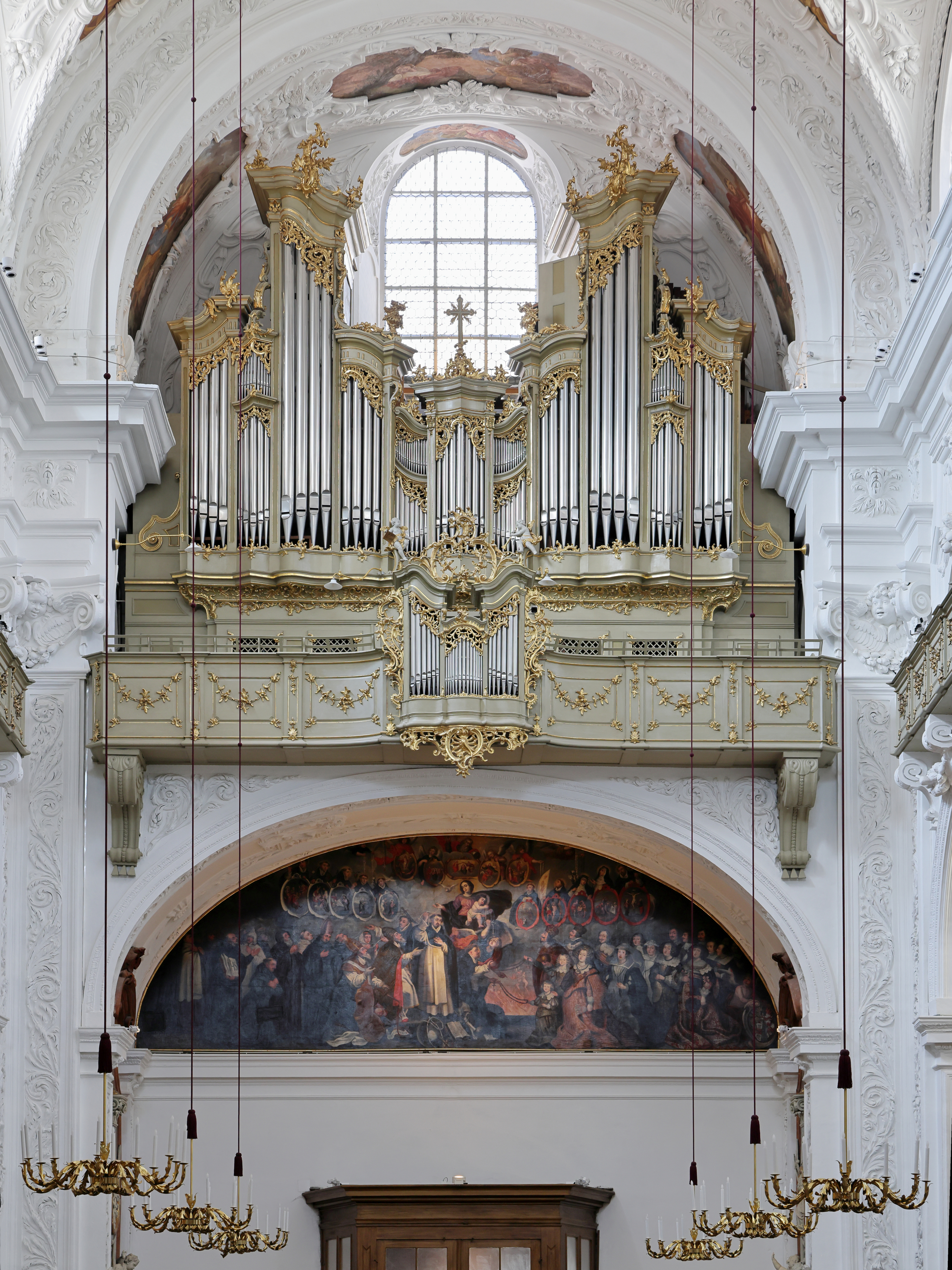
Organ in the Dominican Church, Vienna

From 4 November 1949, while still studying, Haselböck became organist at the Dominican Church, Vienna, and held the office for 65 years. He also taught Latin and German at the later Sigmund-Freud-Gymnasium. He achieved first prize at the Internationaler Orgelimprovisationswettbewerb Haarlem, an international competition in organ improvisation at the St. Bavo church, three times in a row until 1960. That year, he began teaching organ and improvisation at the Vienna Music Academy. He directed the faculty of church music from 1963 to 1987. He was appointed professor in 1972. He was deputy rector from 1985 to 1990. At the academy, he was instrumental in developing the faculty at its present location in the former Ursulinen monastery.

Haselböck received international recognition in many concerts in Austria and in Europe, North America, Near East and Far East, including San Marco, Westminster Cathedral and the Thomaskirche. He played in many cathedrals of German and at historic organs. Concert halls included the Rudolfinum in Prague, the Philharmonie Berlin and the Tchaikovsky Hall in Moscow. After a concert of The Proms at the Royal Albert Hall in London, a critic noted that the audience applauded as if Johann Sebastian Bach had returned from the grave to play his Toccata and Fugue in D.

Haselböck was an advisor for new organs and restorations. He was instrumental in the restoration of the Great Organ at the Konzerthaus, Vienna. He ran broadcasts and wrote books about organs, and held master classes in Europe, the U.S. and Japan, especially for organ improvisation. Haselböck also served as a juror at international competitions. He was the organist for the Requiem for Otto von Habsburg at the Vienna Cathedral on 16 July 2011.

Haselböck composed pieces of religious music, such as Salzburger Messe, Psalmenproprium, and Psalm 103. He wrote a book on Baroque organ music, titled Barocker Orgelschatz in Niederösterreich (Baroque organ treasure in Lower Austria), among others. He was honoured by a concert on 1 July 2018, on the occasion of his 90th birthday at the Andermatt Swiss Alps festival, with him also playing.

Haselböck and his wife Lucia had two sons, Martin Haselböck, also an organist, and Lukas Haselböck, a composer and musicologist. He died in Vienna on 20 October 2021, at the age of 93. His younger brother, Franz, was also an organist and music educator.

== Portrait ==
Haselböck was portrayed on radio in the series Menschenbilder (Images of people), titled Die Welt der Orgel – Hans Haselböck (The world of the organ), in a report by Heinz Janisch aired by Ö1 on 24 May 2015.

== Awards ==
Haselböck was awarded the state culture prize of Lower Austria in 1961. He received a composition first prize at the Unda festival in Sevilla in both 1964 and 1967. In 1997, he received the Ehrenzeichen für Verdienste um die Republik Österreich.

== Publications ==
Books by Haselböck are held by the German National Library:

- Barocker Orgelschatz in Niederösterreich. Manutiuspresse, Vienna and Munich 1972, ISBN 3-85171-055-X
- Von der Orgel und der Musica sacra. Historisch-kritische Beiträge zu Fragen von Orgelbau, Orgelkomposition und neuer Kirchenmusik. In: publications of the Institut für Kirchenmusikalische Werkpraxis Vienny, vol. 1, Doblinger, Vienna and Munich 1988, ISBN 3-900695-03-2
- Vom Glanz und Elend der Orgel. Seltsames und Eigenartiges, Bedeutsames und Unwichtiges, Nachweisliches und Unglaubliches, Prosaisches und Poetisches von einem eigentlich unfaßbaren Musikinstrument. Atlantis-Musikbuch-Verlag, Zürich and Mainz 1999, ISBN 3-254-00244-X
- Organistenbüchlein. Ein amüsanter und lehrreicher Streifzug durch die Welt der Orgel und ihrer Protagonisten. Atlantis-Musikbuch-Verlag, Zürich and Mainz 2003, ISBN 3-254-00262-8
