= Franz Haselböck =

Austrian organist (1939–2024)

Franz Haselböck (28 March 1939 in Maria Langegg; – 11 February 2024 in Krems an der Donau) was an Austrian organist and music educator.

== Life and career ==
Franz Haselböck was born on 28 March 1939, in Maria Langegg, a village in Bergern im Dunkelsteinerwald, the younger brother of the organist Hans Haselböck. He engaged with organ music from an early age and was a chorister at the nearby Göttweig Abbey. After studying at the Vienna Music Academy under Walter Pach and Anton Heiller, he worked as a music educator at the Pedagogical Academy in Krems [Kirchliche Pädagogische Hochschule Wien/Niederösterreich].

He released numerous recordings of organ works, particularly under the Da Camera Magna and Musical Heritage Society labels, and he also worked as an editor of previously unpublished compositions.

== Personal life ==
Haselböck was married and the father of two sons. He passed away on 11 February 2024, in Krems an der Donau. He was buried on 16 February 2024, in Senftenberg, Austria.

== Awards ==
- 1960: Prize of the International Summer Academy for Organists in Haarlem of Internationaal Orgelfestival Haarlem
- 1978 and 1987: Advancement Award of the State of Lower Austria
- 2001: Golden Decoration of Honour for Services to the State of Lower Austria

== Discography, selected ==
- Musik für Flötenuhren, Spieluhren, Drehorgeln Und Orgelwalzen works of Haydn, Handel, C.P.E. Bach, Eberlin, Mozart, Beethoven (Da Camera Magna, 1967)
- Battaglias • Feldschlachten • Battles • Taisteluja • Batailles (Da Camera Magna, 1968)
- Musik für Flötenuhren, Spieluhren, Drehorgeln Und Orgelwalzen II works of Haydn, Beethoven, Benda, W.F. Bach, C.P.E. Bach (Da Camera Magna, 1969)
- Musik für Orgel und Cembalo works of Vanhal, Pfeiffer, Beck, Geyer, Giussani, C.P.E. Bach, Giordani with John Henry van der Meer on harpsichord (Da Camera Magna, 1969)
- Kuckuck•Nachtigall•Glockenspiel•Zimbelstern und andere Barocke Spielereyen Kerll, Bach, Scronx, Murschhauser, Dandrieu, Lebègue, Storace, Scheidt, Michael Haydn, Martini, Muffat (Da Camera Magna, 1969)
- Die Orgel Meisterhaft gespielt = L'Orgue – Virtuose = Organ Music – Virtuoso concerti of Vanhal, Salieri, Graun, with Capella Academica Wien, Ernst Hinreiner (Koch Schwann Musica Mundi, 1970)
- B–A–C–H works of Bach, Krebs, C.P.E. Bach, J.C.F. Bach, J.C. Bach, Albrechtsberger (Da Camera Magna, 1970)
- Stabat Mater (Palestrina) – Four Toccatas work of Giovanni Pierluigi da Palestrina and Claudio Merulo, with The London Ambrosian Singers, conducted by John McCarthy (Tudor, 1971)
- Die Grosse Orgel des Praemonstratenserchorherrenstifts Schlägl Oberösterreich works of Erbach, Albrechtsberger, Fux, Martini (Psallite, 1972)
- Musica Maximiliana works of Heinrich Finck, Paul Hofhaymer, Ludwig Senfl, Heinrich Isaac; with Les Menestrels (Musical Heritage Society, 1973)
- 19th-Century Austrian Organ Music works of Anton Bruckner, Simon Sechter (Musical Heritage Society, 1974)
- Organ Works works of Johann Jakob Froberger (Musical Heritage Society, 1974) first recording of an album exclusively of Froberger's solo organ compositions
- The Complete Church Sonatas for Organ & Orchestra works of Mozart, with Alois J. Hochstrasser and the Cappella Classica, Graz (Turnabout, 1974)
- Orgelmusik aus Drei Jahrhunderten (Amadeo Gold, 1975)
- Musik für Flötenuhren – Spieluhren – Drehorgeln Und Orgelwalzen III (Da Camera Magna, 1975)
- Music for Organ and Winds with Friedrich Gabler, Josef Spindler, Alfred Hertel, Helmut Riessberger (Turnabout, 1976)
- Organ Works works of Johann Caspar Kerll (Musical Heritage Society, 1977)
- Bells, Birds & Thunder (Peerless, n.d.)
- Christmas Organ Music of the Romantic Era works of Berner, Vinzenz Goller, Josef Latzelsberger, Liszt, Wilhelm Rudnick, Smetana, Wesley (Musical Heritage Society, 1978)
- Die Anton-Preisinger-Orgel zu Stein a. d. Donau (Berliton, 1981)
- Baroque Dances for Organ (Musical Heritage Society, 1981)
- Orgelmusik – Vierhändig, an der Orgel der Grote Kerk in Dordrecht works of George Frideric Handel, Johann Christoph Kellner, Adolf Friedrich Hesse, Albrechtsberger, Christian Gottlob Höpner, Julius André; with Gert Oost (MDG, 1982)
- Musik für Blechbläser, Orgel und Pauken conductor: Wilfried Rittau, and the Kleiner Chor Des Posaunenwerkes Der EKD (MDG, 1982)
- Auf der Orgel = Haydn à l'orgue [Haydn on the Organ] works of Franz Joseph Haydn (Schwann Musica Mundi, 1982)
- 2 Orgeln aus der Orgelbauwerkstätte Friedrich Heftner vorgestellt von Franz Haselböck (Koch Records, 1984)
- Musik auf Schloß Amerongen with Gert Oost (MDG, 1985)
- Händel auf der Orgel works of Handel along with those of Guilmant, and Köhler (Schwann Musica Mundi, 1985)
- Świecka Muzyka Organowa [Secular Organ Music] (2×LP, Veriton, 1986)
- Sämtliche Orgelchoräle work of Johann Michael Bach (Hänssler Classic, 1989)
- Orgelchoräle der Neumeister-Sammlung [Organ Chorales From The Neumeister Collection], works of Johann Sebastian Bach (Hänssler Classic, 1990)
- Orgelwerke der Familie Bach (Hänssler Classic, 1991)
- Orgeln in Südtirol works of Paluselli, Ladurner, anonymous, Goller, Gasser, Mitterer and von An der Lan-Hochbrunn (Koch Schwann, 1992)
