= François Roettiers =

François Roettiers (or Roëttiers, Roettier, Rottier, Rottiers) (1685–1742) was a Flemish Baroque painter, sculptor, medallist and engraver from the early 18th century, who worked mainly in Austria.

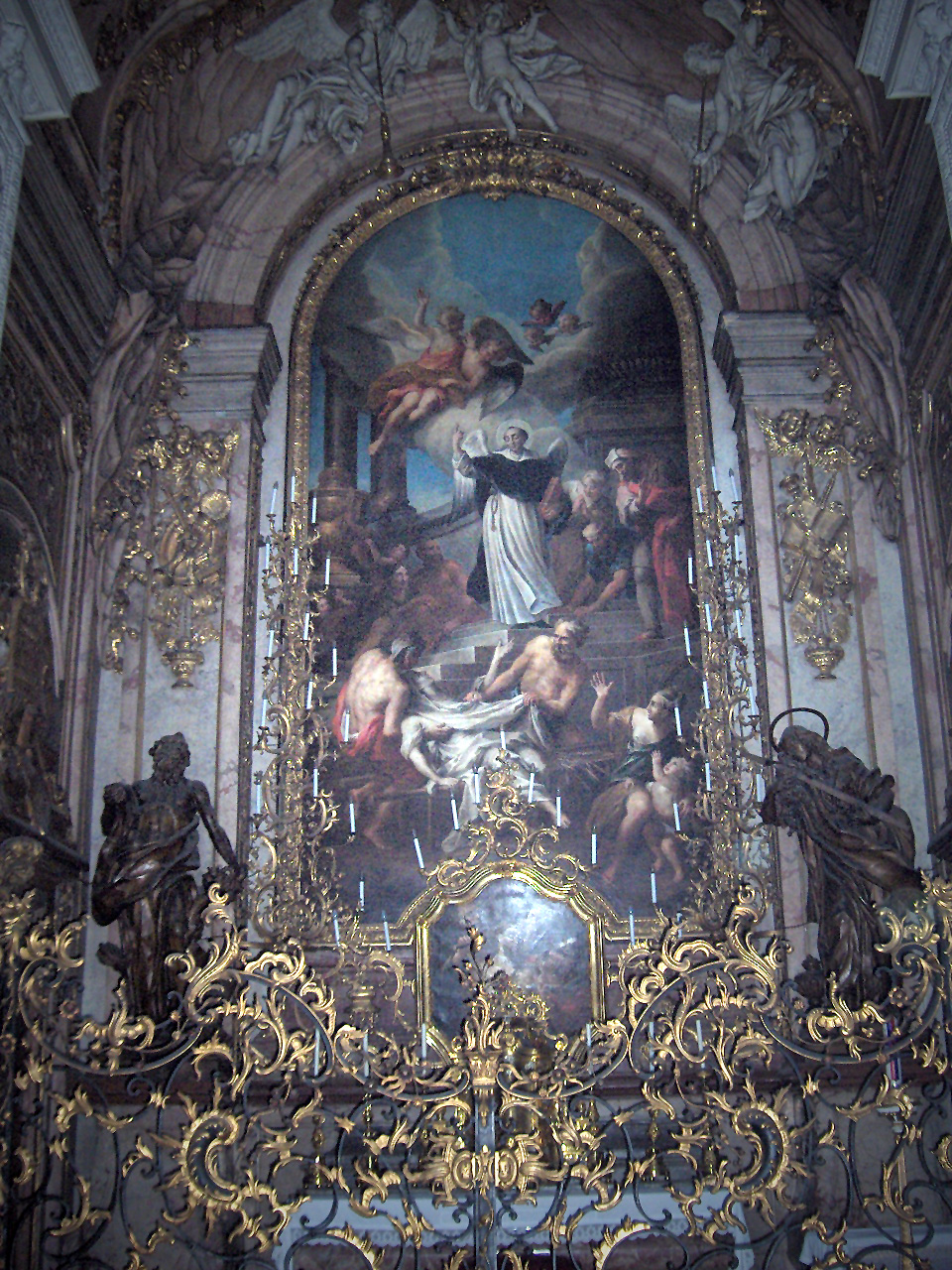
Chapel of Vincent Ferrer in the Dominican church in Vienna

He was born in London on 3 November 1685 in a family of medallists, engravers and goldsmiths. His grandfather Philip Roetters (Antwerp 1596 - Antwerp 1669) had three sons :

- Jan Roettiers (Antwerp 4 July 1631 - London, 1703)
- Joseph Roettiers (Antwerp 1 August 1635 - Paris, 12 September 1703)
- Philip Roettiers (Antwerp 13 September 1640 - Antwerp, 1718) (father of François Roettiers)

Each one of them and their sons continued the family tradition. Some worked in Paris, others at the Royal Mint in London or at the Antwerp Mint.

He became painter at the court of Maximilian II of Bavaria. He followed the prince to Munich and from there to Vienna. While staying in Munich he was influenced by Cosmas Damian Asam. He later became director of the Academy of Vienna (Akademie der Maler, Bildhauer und Baukunstler) in 1718. He died in Vienna on 10 June 1742.

Several of his works can be seen in different musea, churches and palaces :

- The painting The return from exile of Maximilian Emmanuel at the Nymphenburg Palace in Munich, Germany.
- Several paintings at the Dominican church in Vienna, such as the altarpiece and the paintings on the side walls of the chapel of St. Catherine of Siena and the Vincent Ferrer chapel.
- The painting Christ and Peter at the lake of Genasaret (1727) in the Botlzmanngasse church, Alsergrund, district of Vienna, Austria
- The ceiling fresco Falconry and the frescoes in the chapel of the castle of Eckartsau, Austria
- several drawings in the museum Antoine-Lécuyer, Saint-Quentin, France
- drawings : The martyrdom of a saint and Study of sitting figure

He is not to be confused with his namesake and member of the family François Roëttiers the Younger (1702–1770)
