= Franz Geyling =

Austrian painter (1803–1875)

Franz Geyling (Vienna 16 June 1803 - Steyr, 3 May 1875) was an Austrian painter of historical and religious canvases and frescoes. Geyling additionally trained portrait painter, Gyula Benczúr, in the art of drawing.

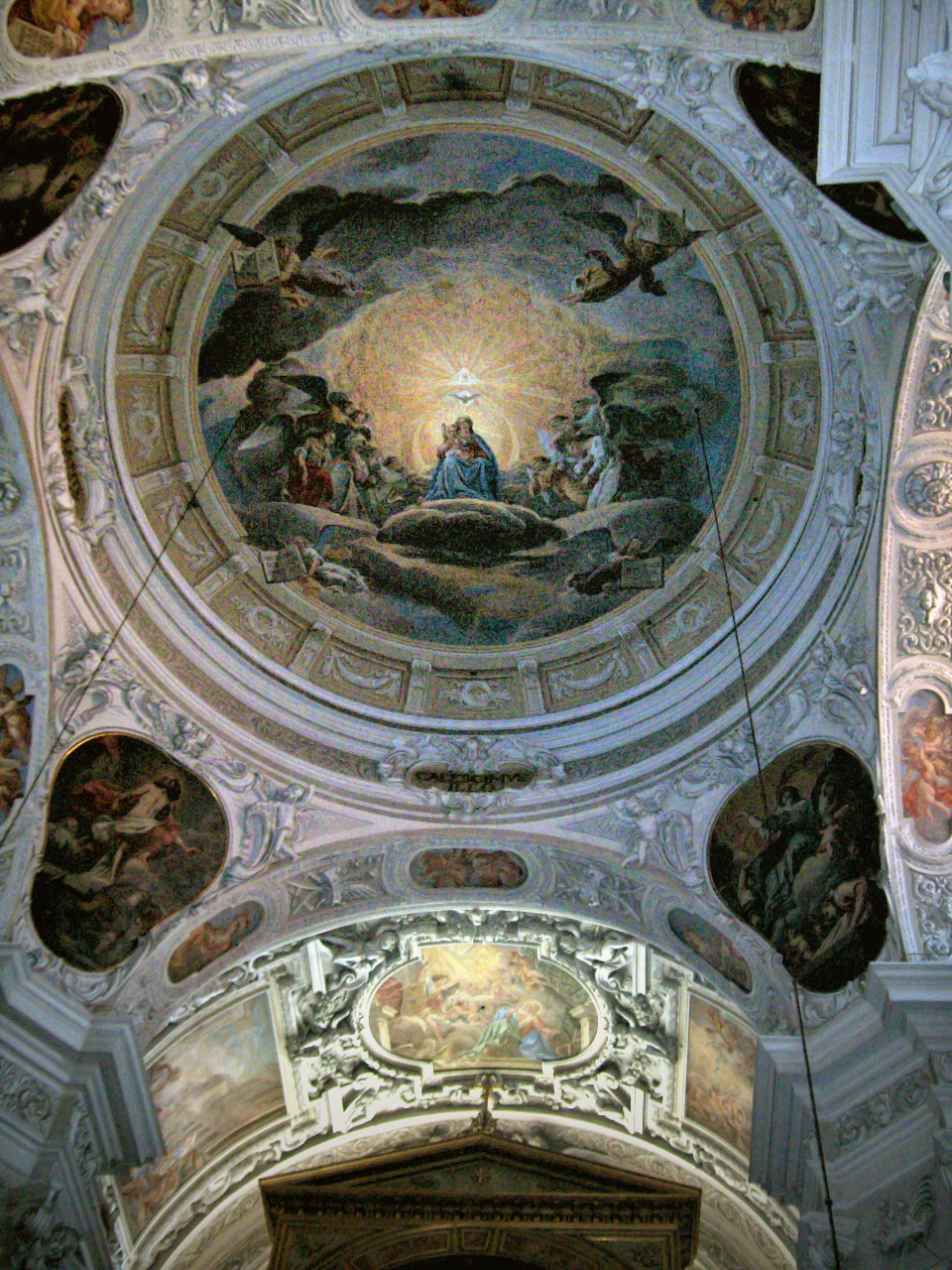
Dome fresco in the Dominikanerkirche in Vienna

He held expositions in Vienna from 1839 onward.

Major works :

- He renovated the frescoes of Daniel Gran (1694 – 1757) in the St. Annakirche in Vienna.
- He also painted in 1836 the frescoes in the dome of the Dominican church in Vienna. It shows Madonna and Child under the golden light of the Trinity, surrounded by kneeling Angels
- Geyling was involved in the restoration of the damaged dome fresco of the Austrian National Library State Hall in 1849-1850
- He was also involved with the Baroque decorations in the Sankt Pölten abbey.
- The ceiling frescoes in the chapel of the castle Burg Raabs an der Thaya (Lower Austria)
