= Carpoforo Tencalla =

Italian painter (1623–1685)

Carpoforo Tencalla (or Tencala; 10 September 1623 – 9 March 1685) was an influential Swiss-Italian Baroque painter of canvases and frescoes. He is little studied and has come only recently to the attention of art critics and historians. He introduced 17th-century Italian painting style with its mythological subjects to Central Europe, reviving the art of fresco on large surfaces.

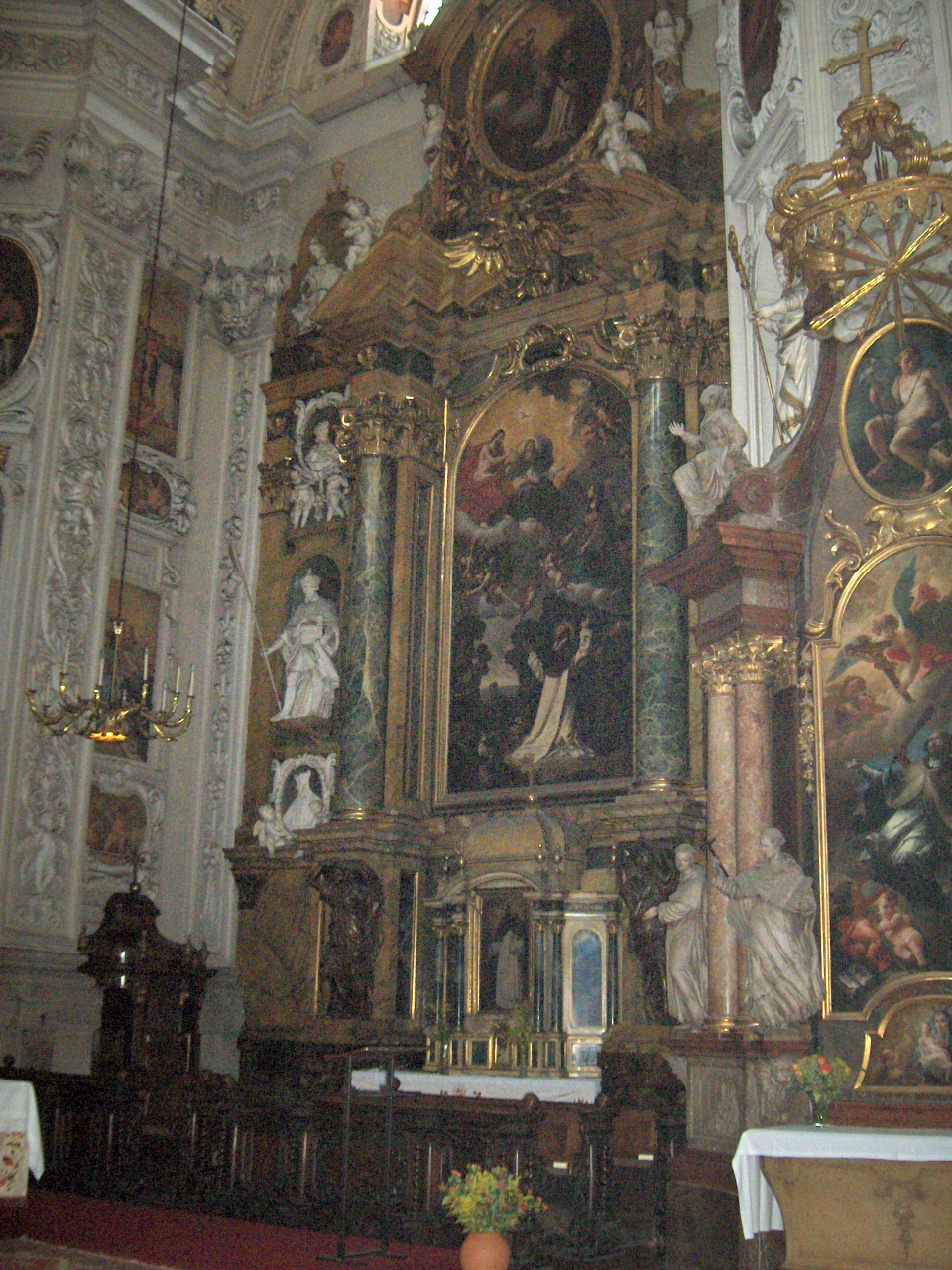
Apotheosis of St. Dominic Dominican church, Vienna

== Biography ==
Tencalla was born in Bissone in southern Switzerland. He began his apprenticeship in Lombardy, probably in Milan, Bergamo and Verona, possibly under Isidoro Bianchi, who was related to his mother. Other potential mentoring figures include Giovanni Stefano Danedi (1608–1689), Giuseppe Danedi (1609–1680) and Carlo Francesco Nuvolone (1609–1702). Tencalla's works also show influences from the Bolognese, Roman and Venetian schools.

He began in 1655 as a fresco painter under the direction of the Italian architect-engineer Filiberto Lucchese in the Pálffy castle Červený Kameň (now Slovakia). Through these paintings Tencalla contributed to the introduction of Early Baroque style in Central Europe.

An early painting of his can be found in the Palazzo Terzi in Bergamo. In 1659 he received a commission from the Benedictine Lambach Abbey in Austria for a number of frescoes in the presbitary of the monastery church. In 1660–61 he decorated the palace of the Count von Abensperg and Traun in Vienna. These no longer exist.

Between 1648 and 1657 he painted frescoes in the Caravina Sanctuary in Valsolda, Italy.

Between 1662 and 1665 he painted the altar canvas in the San Giacomo church as well as the frescos for the Palazzo Solza and Palazzo Terzi in Bergamo.

Between 1665 and 1667 he returned to Vienna, where he decorated the rooms of the new Leopold wing of the Hofburg palace (no longer in existence). He also became the court painter of Eleonore Gonzaga, widow of Ferdinand II, Holy Roman Emperor.

As he became more famous, his patrons grew among the upper clergy and aristocracy in Vienna, Moravia, Styria and Hungary and his commissions grew accordingly.

Between 1666 and 1667 he decorated the Petronell castle of Count Ernst III von Abensperg-Traun with a number of mythological frescoes. Most were lost in a fire in 1683 during the Battle of Vienna but a few remain. He was invited by the Heiligenkreuz Abbey to decorate their new sacristy. Unfortunately, these frescoes were also lost in a fire in 1683.

Between 1668 and 1669 he decorated several churches in Vienna including the Servites, Franciscan, and Dominican churches. By 1670 he was at work painting the hall and chapel of the Trautenfels castle in the Styria, decorating them with mythological frescoes. At about that same time he decorated the Eisenstadt castle of the House of Esterházy.

Tencalla's major works are to be found in Slovakia, Moldavia, Austria, Germany and the Czech Republic:

- Monasteries of Lambach, Heiligenkreuz
- Episcopal palaces of Olomouc
- Episcopal palace of the Prince-Bishop Karl II von Liechtenstein-Kastelkorn (1664–1695) in Kroměříž: the architect was his brother Giovanni Pietro Tencalla, who invited him to do extensive frescoes and paintings. Only the paintings in the rotunda have survived.
- Cathedral of Passau (1679–1685): frescoes for the nave and choir.
- The apse surrounding the main altar of the Dominican church in Vienna (1675). These are decorated with two historic paintings of Christian victories: 1) the Battle of Muret (1213) and 2) the Battle of Lepanto (1571). Tencalla also added paintings to the walls of the side chapels.

After his death in 1685, his son-in-law Carlo Antonio Bussi completed his work at the cathedral of Passau and in the San Carpoforo church in Bissone.

== Bibliography ==
- Benezit, Emmanuel (1976). Dictionnaire des Peintres, Sculpteurs, Dessinateurs et Graveurs. Paris: Librairie Gründ. ISBN 2-7000-0158-3.
- Turner, Jane (1990). Grove Dictionary of Art. MacMIllan Publishers. ISBN 1-884446-00-0.
- Mollisi, Giorgio (2005). Carpoforo Tencalla 1623-1685. Pittura Seicentesca fra Milano e l'Europa Centrale. Switzerland. "exhibition catalogue in Rancate, Canton Ticino"
- Rūstis Kamuntavičius et al.: "Artisti del lago di Lugano e del Mendrisiotto in Lituania", in Gli artisti del lago di Lugano e del Mendrisiotto nel Granducato di Lituania (dal XVI al XVIII sec.), Giorgio Mollisi (ed.), Arte&Storia, Edizioni Ticino Management, n. 59, Lugano, August–October 2013.
