= Dominican Church, Vienna =

Baroque parish church and minor basilica in Vienna, Austria

Dominican Church
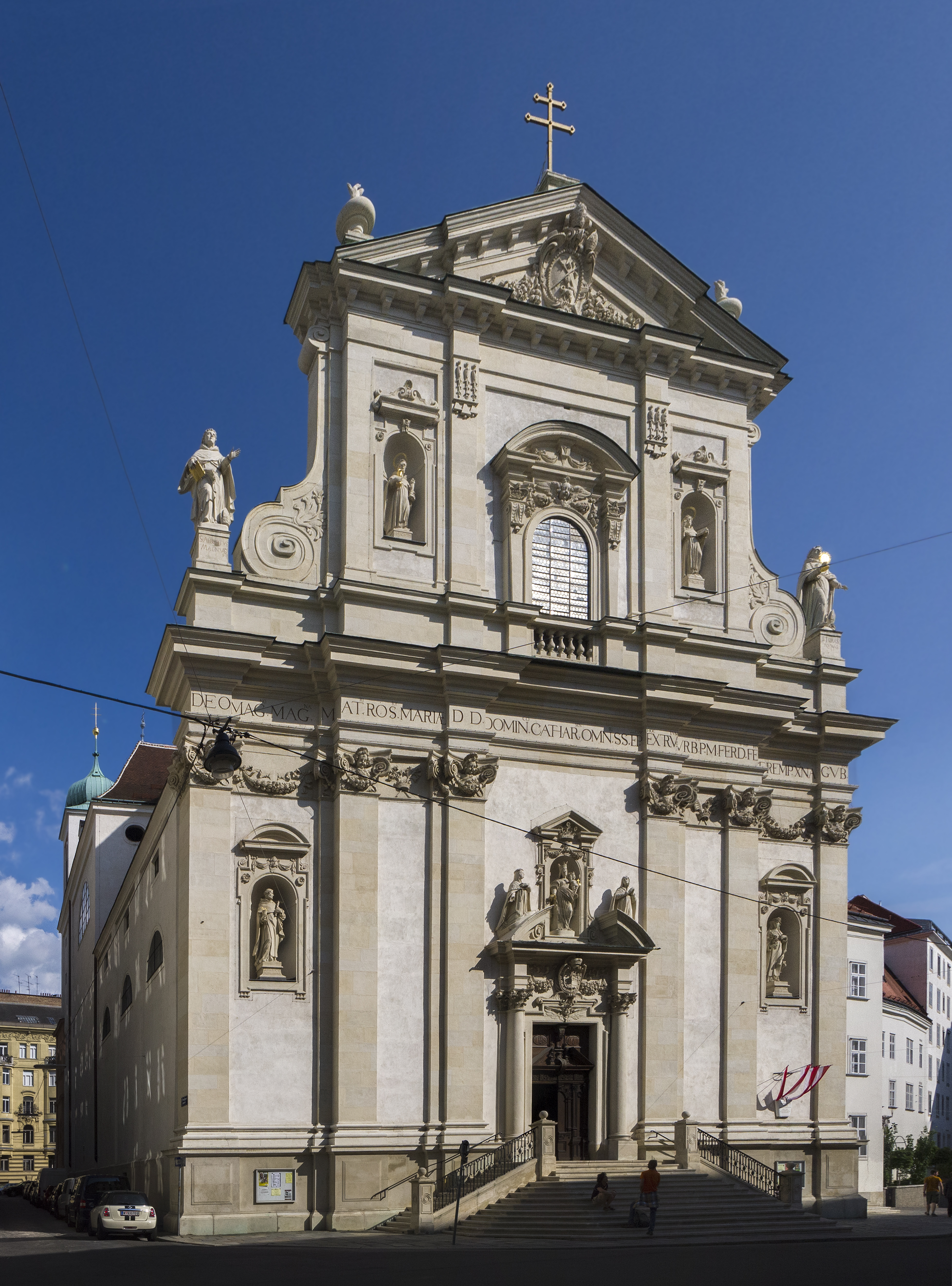

- Location within Vienna Location within Austria

Religion
- Affiliation: Catholic Church
- Leadership: Pater Günter Reitzi OP
- Year consecrated: 1631

Location
- Location: Vienna, Austria
- Coordinates: 48.2088°N 16.3788°E

Architecture
- Architects: Jacopo Spacio, Cipriano Biasino, Carpoforo Tencala, Antonio Canevale
- Type: Church, Basilica minor
- Style: Baroque
- Groundbreaking: 1631
- Completed: 1634

Specifications
- Direction of façade: NW
- Length: 60 m
- Width: 25 m
- Width (nave): 14 m

Website
- www.mariarotunda.at

The Dominican Church (German: Dominikanerkirche), also known as the Church of St. Maria Rotunda, is an early Baroque parish church and minor basilica in the historic center of Vienna, Austria. It is the third church built on the same site in the course of time.

== History ==
The first church on this site was built in 1237 by the newly arrived Dominicans on a parcel of land allotted in 1225-1226 by the duke Leopold VI. The church was enlarged between 1240–1270 and a new choir was added in 1273. A series of fires caused the construction of a new Gothic church between 1283 and 1302. The nave was extended between 1458 and 1474. This church consisted of a nave with five cross vaults, and two aisles.

This church was heavily damaged during the first siege of Vienna by the Turkish army in 1529. The choir was demolished and the nave was partly taken down. The building became more and more dilapidated during the next period.

The new-found self-awareness of the Counter-Reformation didn’t allow any more such a sorry state for a church. In 1631 the Dominicans started to build a new oblong church with a dome, following the plan of Jacopo Tencala, architect of Prince Maximilian of Liechtenstein. The master builders were Jacopo Spacio, Cipriano Biasino and Antonio Canevale. They introduced to Vienna the Baroque style of Italy. The first stone was laid by emperor Ferdinand II on 29 May 1631. The structural work was finished in 1634. The church was consecrated on 1 October 1634. The finishing touch was finally given in 1674. The church was elevated to the status of basilica minor in 1927 under the name “Rosary Basilica ad S. Mariam Rotundam”.

== Facade ==
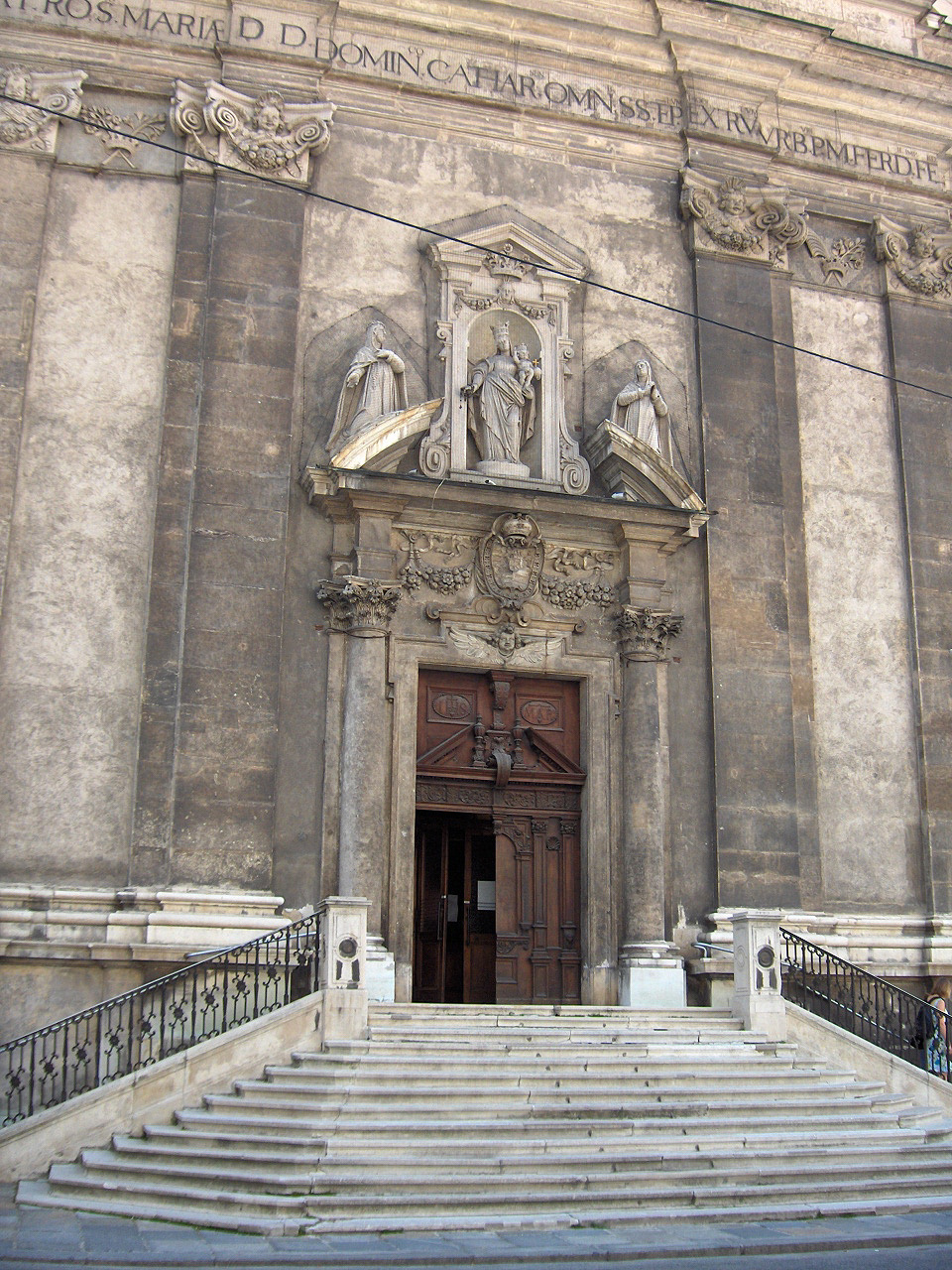
Façade

The impressive facade was built in the Roman-Lombardic style with dominant columns, supporting the cornice. Its architecture goes back to early Baroque churches in Rome, that in turn, rely on the facade of the Dominican church Santa Maria Novella in Florence. Above the portal one can see the statues of St. Catherine of Siena and Agnes of Montepulciano, kneeling at the feet of Our Lady, patron saint of this church. On both sides of the portal there are niches with (on the left) the statue of Ludwig Bertrand and (on the right) Saint Rose of Lima. On top of the facade is a large rectangular gable with a dormer window, crowned by a pediment.

== Interior ==
The church consists of a long central nave, flanked by three side chapels on each side, a transept, a choir and an apse. The nave is approximately 25 m long, 14 m wide, and 22.10 m high. The large dome reaches a height of 23.80 m. Above each side chapel is gallery with a shallow balcony.

== Frescoes ==
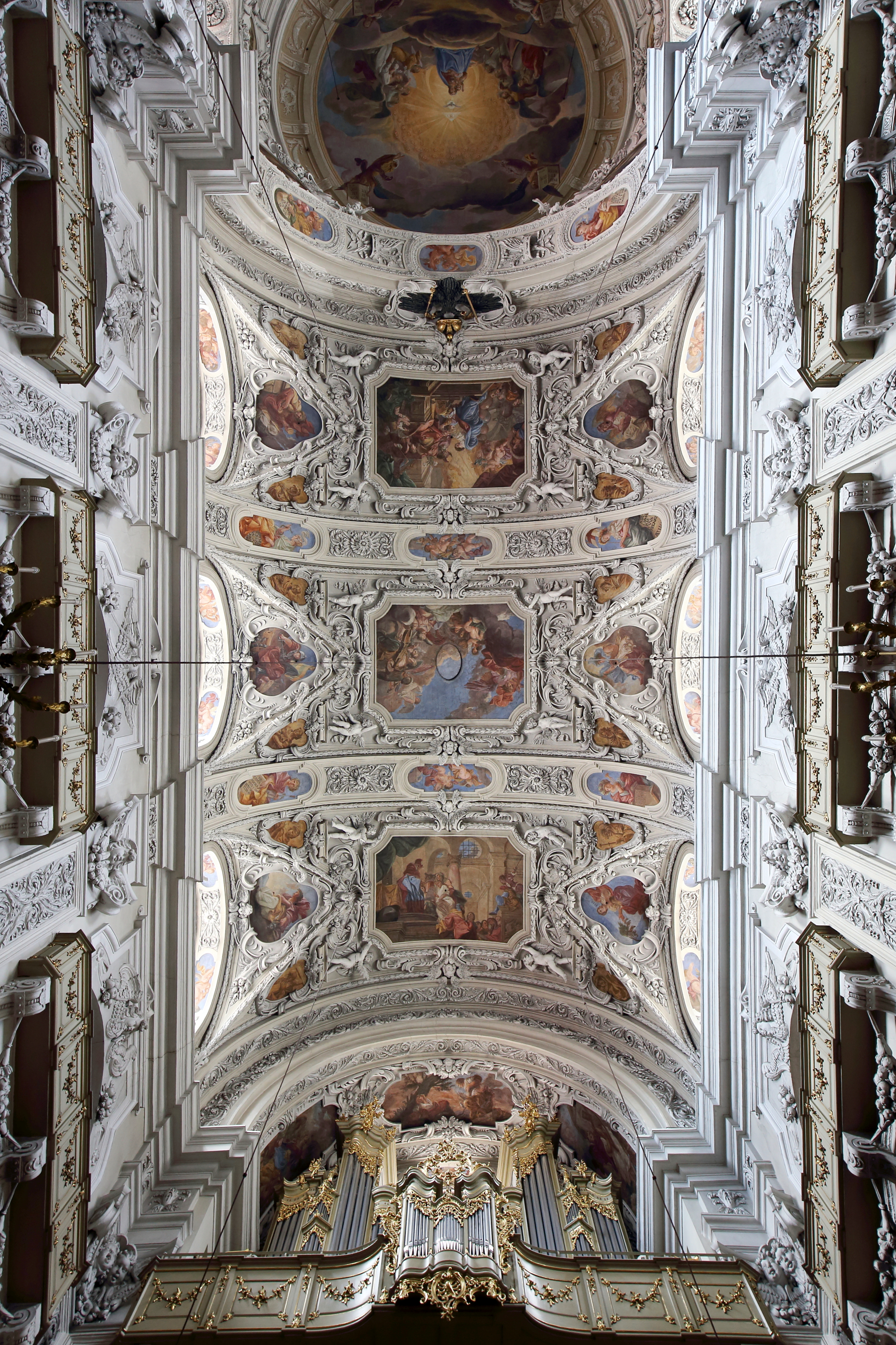
Frescoes of Matthias Rauchmiller

The ornate interior is imposing by its architecture and the exquisite stucco in the decorations. Semi-circular windows allow a soft light on the frescoes of the barrel-vaulted ceiling. The ceiling frescoes are the work of Matthias Rauchmiller (1675), showing in their color and composition the influence of Peter Paul Rubens. They depict in 46 scenes the life of Our Lady. The influential painter Carpoforo Tencalla decorated at the same time the apse around the main altar with two historic paintings of Christian victories, ascribed to power of the Rosary : the Battle of Muret (1213) and the Battle of Lepanto (1571). Tencala also added some paintings on the walls of the side chapels. The fresco in the dome replaced an earlier work by Nikolaus van Hoy (1674) when the new dome was built in 1820. The fresco dates from 1836 and is by Franz Geyling. It shows Our Lady and Child under the golden light of the Trinity, surrounded by kneeling Angels. The medallions in the four supporting columns are by an unknown artist, depicting three popes from the Dominican Order (Innocent V, Benedict XI and Pius V) and St. Antony of Florence. The large statues in these columns show us the four original Doctors of the Church (Jerome, Gregory the Great, Augustine and Ambrose), all sculpted by a local artist.

== Main altar ==
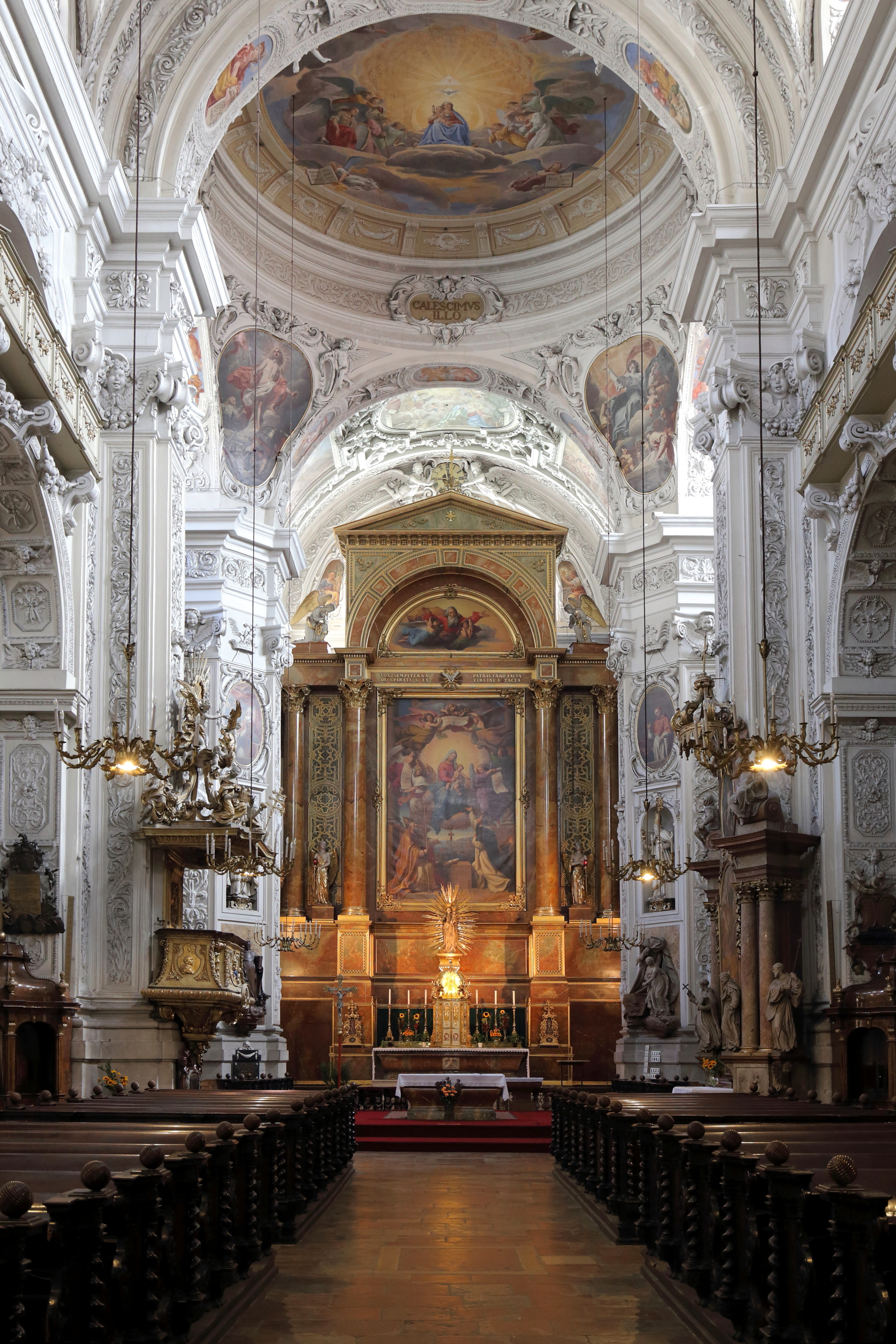
Main altar

The apse is dominated by the imposing red-marbled wooden retable in Baroque style from 1839-1840 by Carl Roesner, replacing the dilapidated old altarpiece. It surrounds the large canvas (720 cm x 430 cm) by Leopold Kupelwieser (1840), flanked by red Corinthian columns. It depicts the establishment by Pope Pius V of the Feast of the Rosary. The tabernacle dates from 1885 and is made of gilded brass.

== Pulpit ==
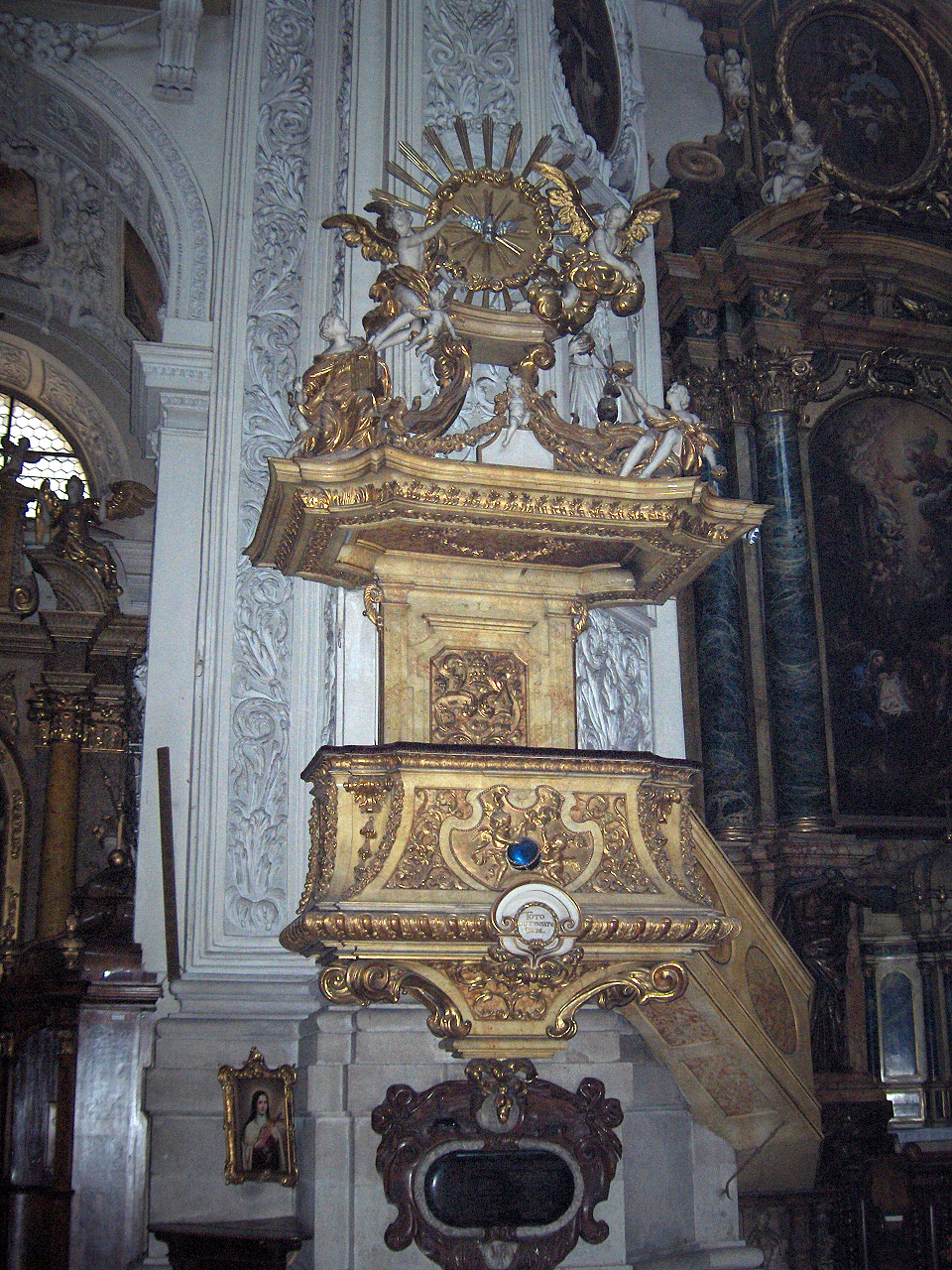
Pulpit

The gilded pulpit dates from 1700 and was made by Matthias Steinl. It was modeled on an engraving by Jean le Pautre (1618–1682), that now can be seen at the Martin von Wagner Museum in Würzburg, Germany. The antependium shows a blue globe surrounded by a rosary and below, in the medaillon, the motto "toto diffunditur orbe" (spread all over the world). On the canopy of the pulpit the Holy Spirit, represented in the form of a dove, is surrounded by a halo of light and angels in elegant poses.

== Transept chapels ==
- Altar of Saint Dominic : painting by Tobias Pock (1655), depicting the saint adoring the Trinity. The statue on the predella is a copy of the True image of St. Dominic in the pilgrimage church of Soriano, Calabria, Southern Italy. The niches contain the statues of (below) St. Leopold and St. Florian, and (above) St. Catherine of Alexandria and St. Barbara. Claudia Felicitas of Austria, second wife of Leopold I, Holy Roman Emperor, was buried at the age of 22 in the crypt of this chapel. She died on 2 September 1676.
- Altar of John of Nepomuk, situated against the pillar of the crossing. The painting is by an unknown master. The four statues (Antony of Padua, Vincent Ferrer, the apostle Peter, and Severin von Noricum) were sculpted by Lorenzo Mattielli in 1724. At the top of the volutes, resting on the capitals of double columns flanking the statues, he added female figures, allegories of Faith and Hope.

== Side chapels ==
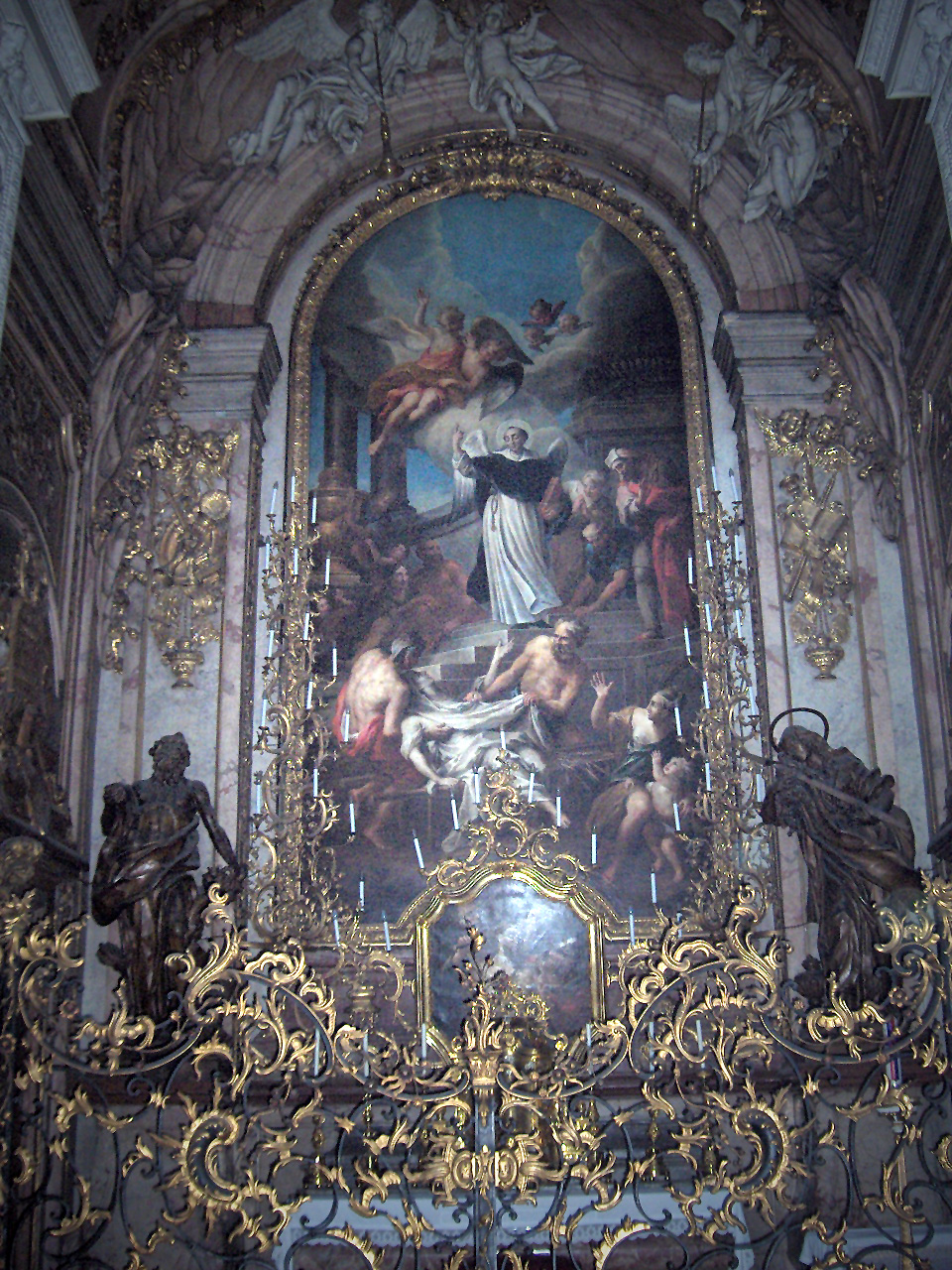
Side chapel of Vincent Ferrer; painting by François Roettiers

Each of the six chapels is dedicated to a saint, portrayed in the painting above the altar.

- Chapel of St. Catherine of Siena : situated next to the pulpit. The painting, ascribed to François Roettiers (1685–1742), depicts the Mythical wedding of the saint with Christ. The paintings on the side walls are by the same artist.
- Chapel of Thomas Aquinas : The paintings of the altarpiece and the side walls are by the Flemish painter Frans Luycx (1638 and 1649–1650)
- Chapel of Saint Rose of Lima : the original altarpiece of this Dominican saint by an anonymous master (1671) was replaced in the second half of the 18th century by a Coronation of Our Lady
- Chapel of Saint Anne (mother of Mary) : the altarpiece with St. Anna, St. John the Baptist and St. Barbara has a long time wrongly been ascribed to Tobias Pock
- Chapel of St. Vincent Ferrer : . The magnificent paintings are again by François Roettiers. The altarpiece (1726) shows the saint bringing back to life a dead person. The angels with trumpets above the painting refer to the mission of this preacher of penitence. The high-quality bronzed statues of St. Jerome and Mary Magdalen were produced by the workshop of Johann-Georg Bendl. The gilded wrought-iron fencing of the chapel is the work of the monks Martin Eker and Raymund Schrob.
- Chapel of St. Catherine of Alexandria : The altarpiece is by Tobias Pock, depicting realistically the martyrdom of the saint. The side walls were painted by Frans Leuyx

== The organ ==
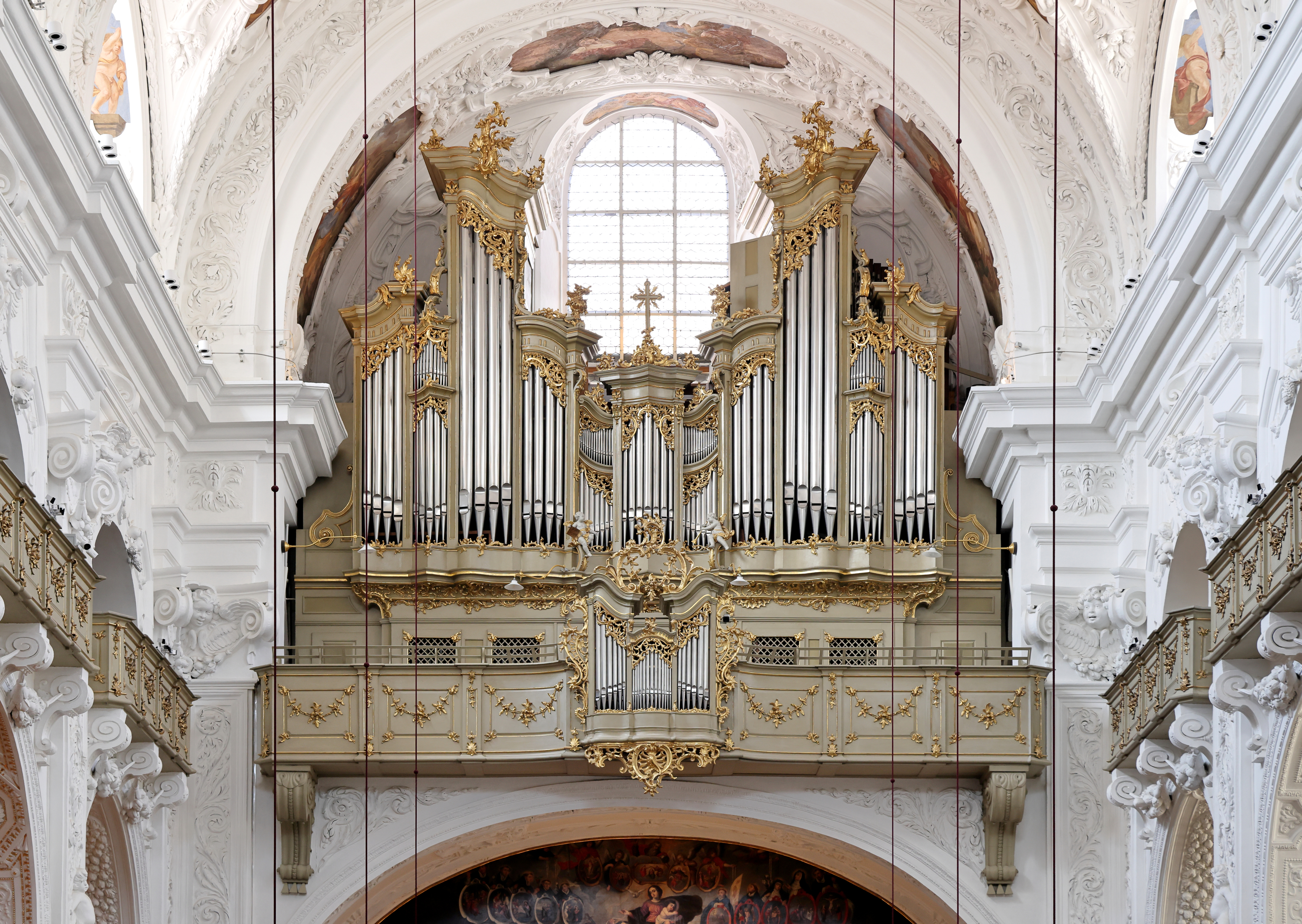
Organ

The main body of the organ was made in two parts at about 1750 according to the traditions of the Vienna organ builders of that time. The gilded concave-convex balustrade of the rood loft is a typical example of the transition between Baroque and Rococo. The organ with 34 registers dates from 1895–1896 and was renovated in 1991. The painting under the rood loft is by an anonymous master from 1642 and depicts the glorification of the rosary and the mediation via Saint Dominic.

Hans Haselböck was organist at the church from 1949 to 2014.

== See also ==
- List of Catholic churches in Austria
- Roman Catholicism in Austria
