= Carlo Antonio Bussi =

Swiss artist (1658–1690)

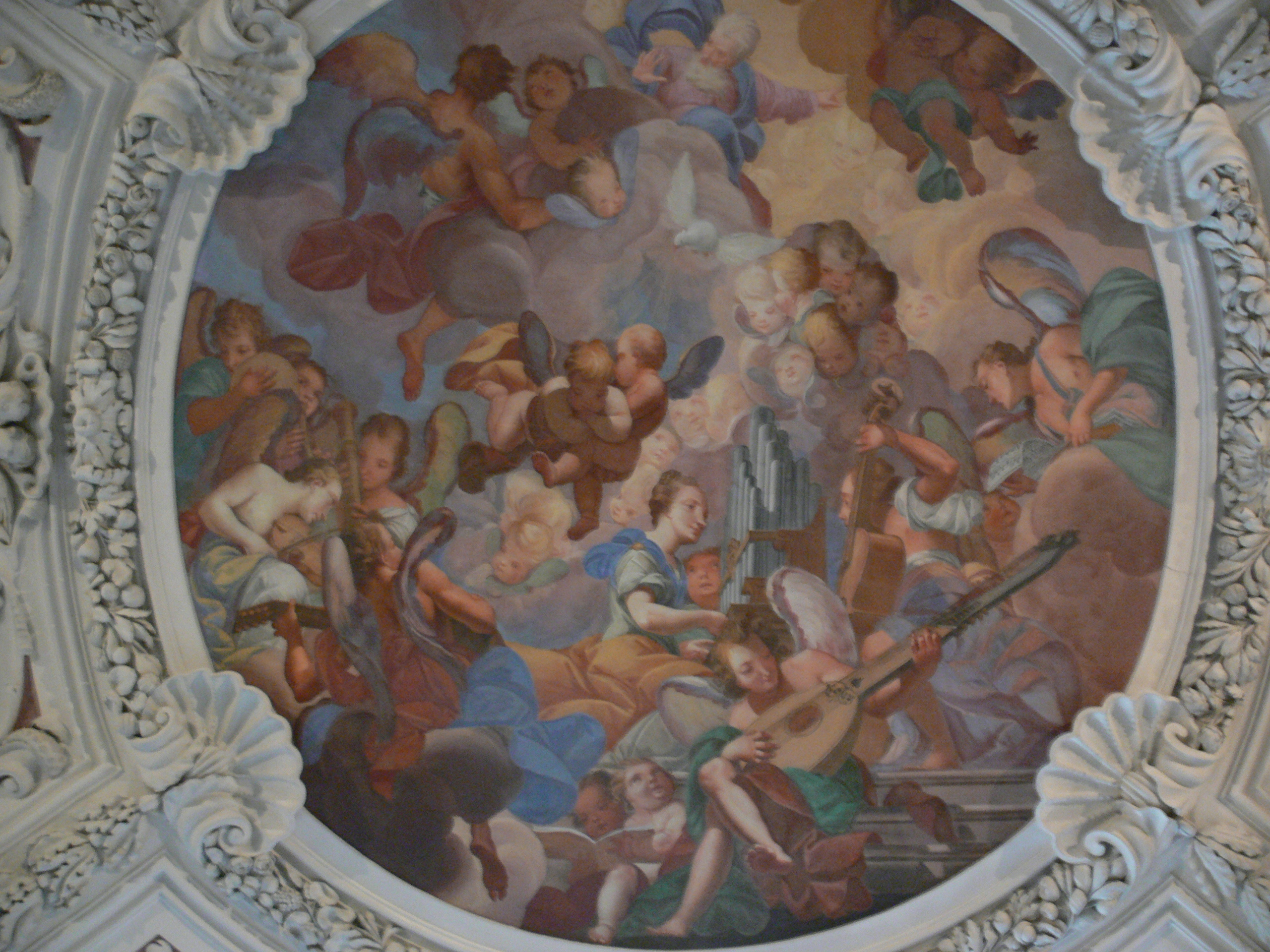
Carlo Antonio Bussi, Angel Concert, painting under the organ loft of the St. Stephan's Cathedral, Passau, 1687/1688

Carlo Antonio Bussi (1658 – 15 July 1690) was a Swiss painter. Bussi was born in Bissone. He primarily painted church interiors. In 1682 he married Margarete, the daughter of another Swiss painter Carpoforo Tencalla. After his father-in-law's death in 1685, Bussi completed some of Tencalla's projects. Bussi died in Vöcklabruck in 1690.
