= Lotte Backes =

German pianist, organist and composer

Lotte Backes (May 2, 1901 - May 12, 1990) was a German pianist, organist, and composer.

== Life ==
Backes was born in Cologne into a musical family. Her mother, also a composer, was her first teacher. She went on to study organ and piano at the music conservatories in Strasbourg (1915-1917) and Dusseldorf. (1918-1922). She then continued her studies at the Academy of Arts in Berlin. From 1935 to 1938. she studied composition at the Prussian Academy of Arts. Her works written prior to 1945 were destroyed during World War II. She lived in Berlin from 1931 to 1990.

Her works after 1947 include two operas, a symphony, and works for choir and organ. She was awarded the Federal Cross of Merit.

== Works ==
=== Orchestra ===
- Sommerliche Wanderung (1947)
- Symphonic Poems

=== Chamber Ensemble ===
- Walk in the summer, fl, ob, van, vlc, per, hp, cel
- Sprazzo di luce, string quartet, hp, perc (1974)
- Reisebilder, string quartet (1980)
- Ballade, fl, hp, pf (1980)
- Concertante, vlc and pf (1966)
- Concerto, vln and organ (1970)
- Episodio, trp and organ (1972)
- Movimenti improvvisati, hp and per (1973)
- Serenata, vln and hp (1965)
- Sonata, trp and org (1972)
- Sonata I, vln and org (1972)
- Spielmusik, ob and pf (1958)
- Intermezzo, hp (1972)
- Pieces, vlc

=== Organ ===
- Capriccio (1959-60)
- Dein Lob Herr, partita (1970)
- Erschienen ist der herrliche Tag (1961)
- Impressioni divertimenti (1960)
- Improvisation (1959-60)
- Introduction and passacaglia
- Marche nuptiale (1967)
- Meditationen (1959-60)
- Mysterium Dei: Cyprus meditation (1978)
- Organ Fantastic No. 1 (1964)
- Praeludium and Toccata 1 in E (1945)
- Reminisci in perpetuum
- Toccata II (1960)
- Toccata III (1963)
- Veni Creator (1959-60)
- Wie mein Gott will, partita (1969)

=== Piano ===
- Concertino, two pf
- Fantasie (1958)
- Impressionen (1956)
- Konzertstueck (1953)
- Laendiche Miniaturen (1948)
- Suite (1947)
- Three pieces

=== Vocal ===
- Blume, Baum, Vogel (Hesse), (1958)
- Das Lied vom Sturmvogel (Gorky). (1951)
- Die Liebendend (1947)
- Hymne und Wiederkehr (1950)
- And over thirty other songs

=== Sacred ===
- Die letzte Vision, oratorio (speaker, soloists, mix choir, organ), (1958)
- Ave Maria gratia plena (1950-51)
- Domus mea (1950-51)
- Five motet (four part chorus)
- Messe (1947)
- O sacrum Convivial (1950)
- O Salutaris (1950)
- Psalm 24 (1949)
- Psalmm 47 (1949)
- Psalm 100 (1957)
- Requiem (1949)
- Te Deum (1948)
- Ad te, Domine (1952)
- Confiteor tibi Domine (1952)
- Cantiones scare (1962)
- De ascensiones Domini (1961)
- De invocation Spiritus Sancti (1968)
- Sirius (1973)
- Der Gerechte freut sich (1958-59)
- Die Himmel rühmen (1958)
- Et replete sunt omnes Spiritu Sancto (1963)
- In sacratissima notte (1967)
- In tempore adventus (1967)
- Et spiritus Dei terabatur super aquas (1963)
- Laudate Dominum (1952)
- Psalm 8 (1960)
- Psalm 67 (1961)
- Tulerunt Jesum
- Voll der Barmherzigkeit (1959)
