= Lorenzo Mattielli =

Italian sculptor

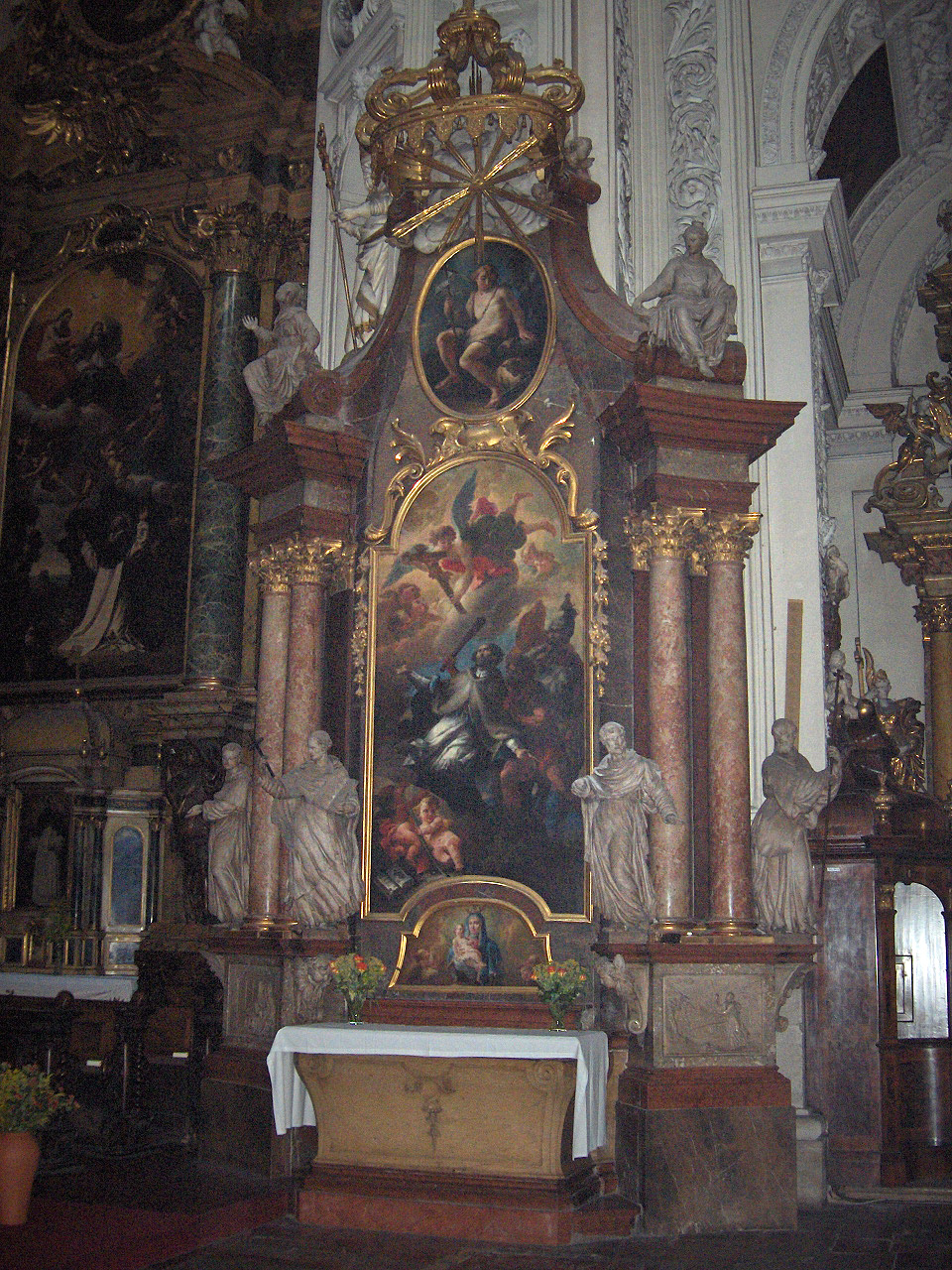
Statues on the John of Nepomuk altar in the Dominikanerkirche, Vienna

Lorenzo Mattielli (1678/1688 ? – 27 or 28 April 1748) was an Italian sculptor from the Late Baroque period. His name has also variously been written as Matielli, Mattiely, Matthielli, and Mathielli. He supplied statuary for palaces and churches in Vienna and Dresden and for the monastery of Melk (Austria).

== Biography ==
He was born in Vicenza, Republic of Venice, but the exact date remains unknown. Different sources give different dates : 1678 to 1688. He apprenticed in the workshop of the famous Vicenzan sculptors Orazio (1643–1720) and his younger brother, Angelo Marinali. In 1705, he married Angelo's daughter and joined of the sculptors’ guild of Vicenza. He worked, together with the brothers Marinali, on the decoration of the Villa Conti (now Lampertico) in Vicenza

He remarried soon after he settled in Vienna in 1712, suggesting he must have been widowed while in Italy, and his wife died at a young age. His new wife, Elisabeth Saceoni, also died very young in 1717, after bearing four children. In 1723, he married for the third time, to Maria Magdalena Kronawatter, and with her fathered seven children. The oldest son, Francesco Antonio Mattielli, would later join Lorenzo's workshop in Vienna.

Among his first commissions in Vienna were the statues for the new Palace (designed by Antonio Beduzzi) and the garden of the rich merchant Leopold von Engelskirchner. Most were destroyed in World War II, but four Attica statues remain (three in the Hofburg in Innsbruck and one in the “Historischen Museum” in Vienna).

Lorenzo Mattielli soon became a close friend of Antonio Beduzzi, who had quickly recognized his skills. They worked often together on the same projects, Beduzzi as painter and designer and Mattielli as sculptor. In the same way, he also worked together with the architect Joseph Emanuel Fischer von Erlach (Karlskirche, Imperial stables in the Hofburg, Schwarzenberg Palace, Reichkanzlertrakt in the Hofburg, Harrach Palace).

In 1714, on Beduzzi's recommendation, Mattielli was appointed sculptor-in-chief at the imperial court of Charles VI. This prestigious appointment garnered him many further commissions from the court, upper aristocracy and churches, such as by Prince Adam Franz von Schwarzenberg, Prince Anton Florian von Liechtenstein, and the family of Count Harrach. He became so inundated with orders that he worked simultaneously on different projects in Vienna, Stift Melk, Lambach Abbey and Mariazell. Therefore, he could only have produced the designs for these sculptures, leaving the actual manual sculpting to local craftsmen. The routine jobs were performed by his workshop.

In these first ten years in Vienna, he slowly developed a personal style with a refined elegance, especially after his trip to Italy (1720–1722).

In 1738, Lorenzo Mattielli was invited to Dresden by king August III, who was married to Maria Josepha, daughter of emperor Joseph I and a long-time Maecenas of Mattielli. He was appointed chief sculptor to the court, receiving special privileges and an adequate remuneration. In 1744 he was appointed inspector in charge of antique and modern statues.

Between 1741 and 1746 he worked at the Neptune fountain in the garden of the Palais Brühl-Marcolini in Friedrichstadt (Dresden). This has become one of his major works.

As the king was building the Hofkirche, a Catholic church in Dresden designed by the Roman Gaetano Chiavari, he commissioned Mattielli to provide 78 statues for this church. These large, sandstone statues stand on a balustrade, surrounding the church. They depict 74 saints and four allegorical figures : Belief, Hope, Charity and Justice. After his death in 1748, his son Francesco finished the work of his father with the statues at the tower in 1752. Many statues were completely destroyed during the bombardment of Dresden on 13 February 1945. Their restoration and the new statues were finished in 2002.

Lorenzo Mattielli was buried in the churchyard of the Hofkirche in Dresden, the city in which he died.

== Works ==
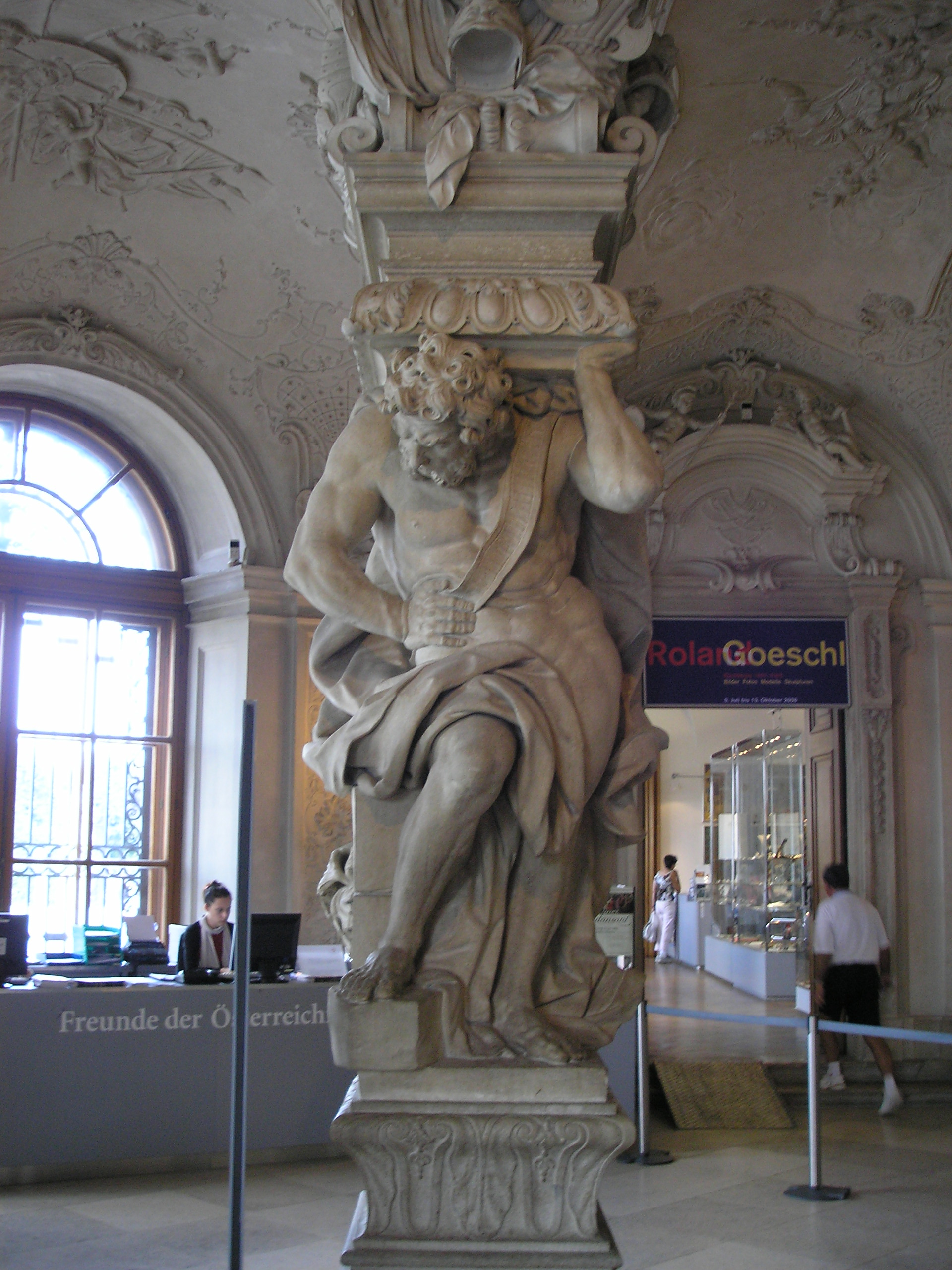
Atlas in the Upper Belvedere, Vienna

Works by Lorenzo Mattielli can be found in

Vienna :

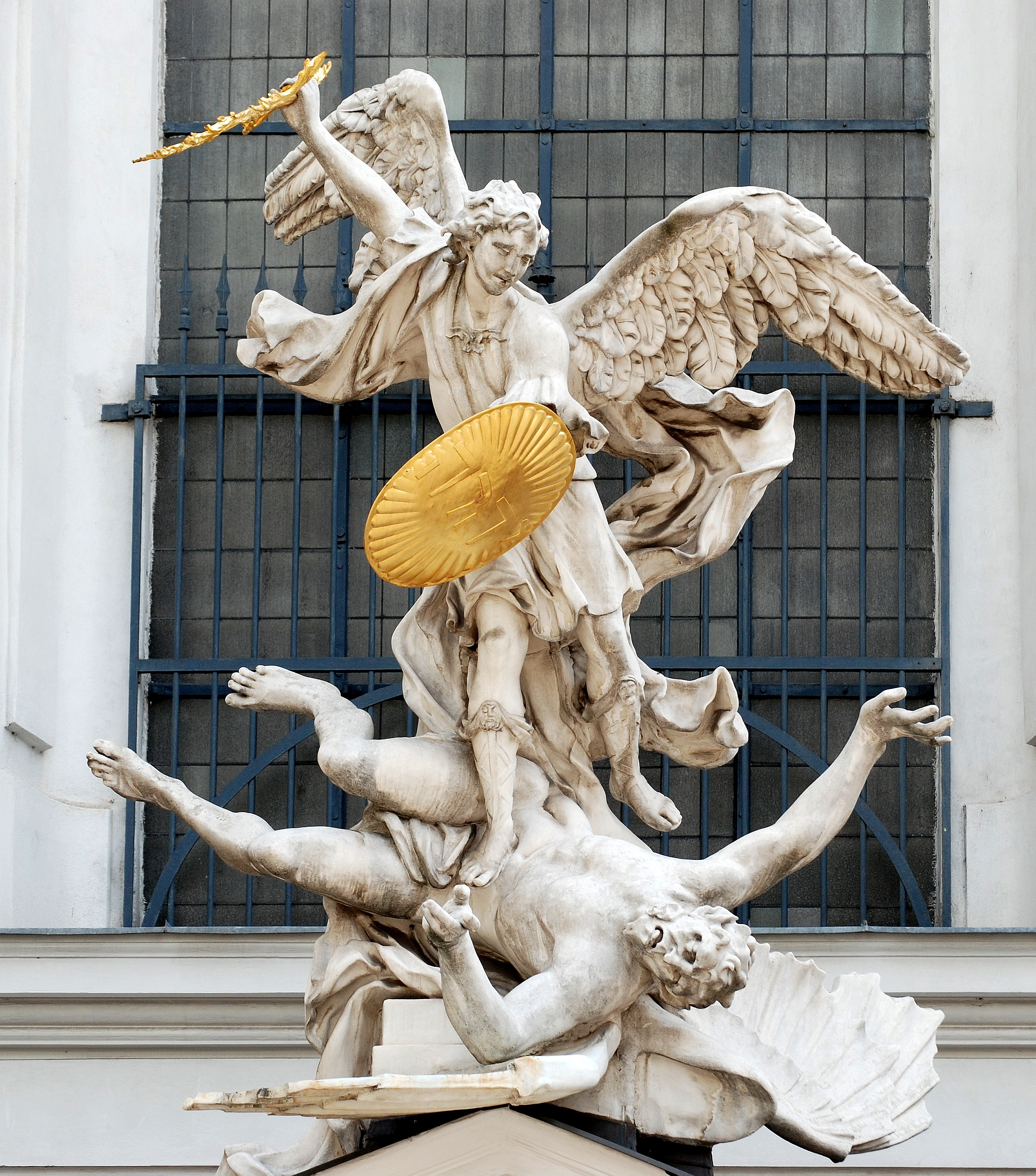
Porch of the Michaelerkirche (1724)

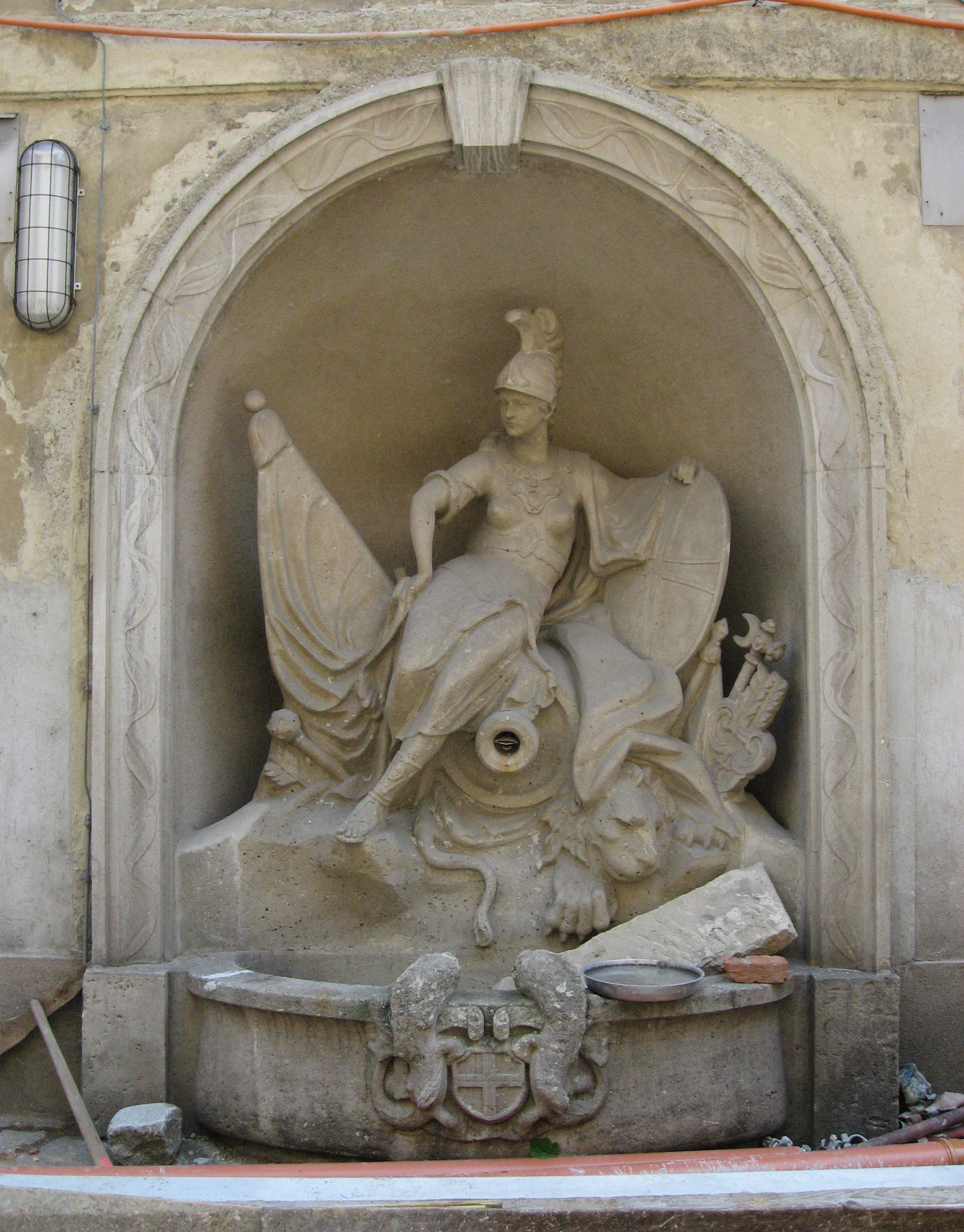
The Bellona Fountain, Vienna

- former Palais Engelskirchner, 1711-15: only four Attika statues remain
- House of Count Lazansky (1714) (attributed to Mattielli) (demolished in 1895)
- former Hirschstetten Palace, 1714–1716
- Hetzendorf Palace (1716–1718)
- Harrach Palace (1720)
- Garden of the Schwarzenberg Palace (1719–1724). Especially the Ragged Old Woman with a Pig is remarkable. This statue of an ugly, grimacing hag seems to be the product of a sickly imagination. In this he predates the contorted faces of “character heads” made by the sculptor Franz Xaver Messerschmidt (1736–1783).
- Upper Belvedere (1721–1722) : hall with atlases
- Dominikanerkirche (Vienna) (1724)
- Imperial stables at the Hofburg (1724)
- Porch of the Michaelerkirche (1724)
- Karlskirche (1725–1730) : eagles on the columns, relievos at the gable end, altar
- Church of the Order of the Visitation of Holy Mary (1726) (attributed to Mattielli)
- the former Imperial Library (now the Prunksaal of the Hofburg complex) (1726)
- Reichkanzleitrakt (in the Hofburg complex) (1728–1729): the Labors of Hercules
- Nepomuk altar in the Peterskirche (1729)
- Civilian arsenal (1732)
- Fountains at the “Am Hof” and “Am Graben” squares (1732–1735)
- Old City Hall (1735) : Putti at the Andromeda fountain (1734)
- Church of the Brothers Hospitallers of St. John of God (1735/36)
- Austrian Baroquemuseum (1736)

Melk Abbey

- Models for the wooden statues in the church (then carried out by Peter Widerin of St. Pölten)
- the angels on top of the portal of the eastern façade

Klosterneuburg

- Several mighty Titans in the Salla terrena (unfinished work)

Warsaw

- St. Kazimierz Church, tombstone of Karolina Sobieska de Bouillon (1746)
