= Tobias Pock =

Austrian artist (1609–1683)

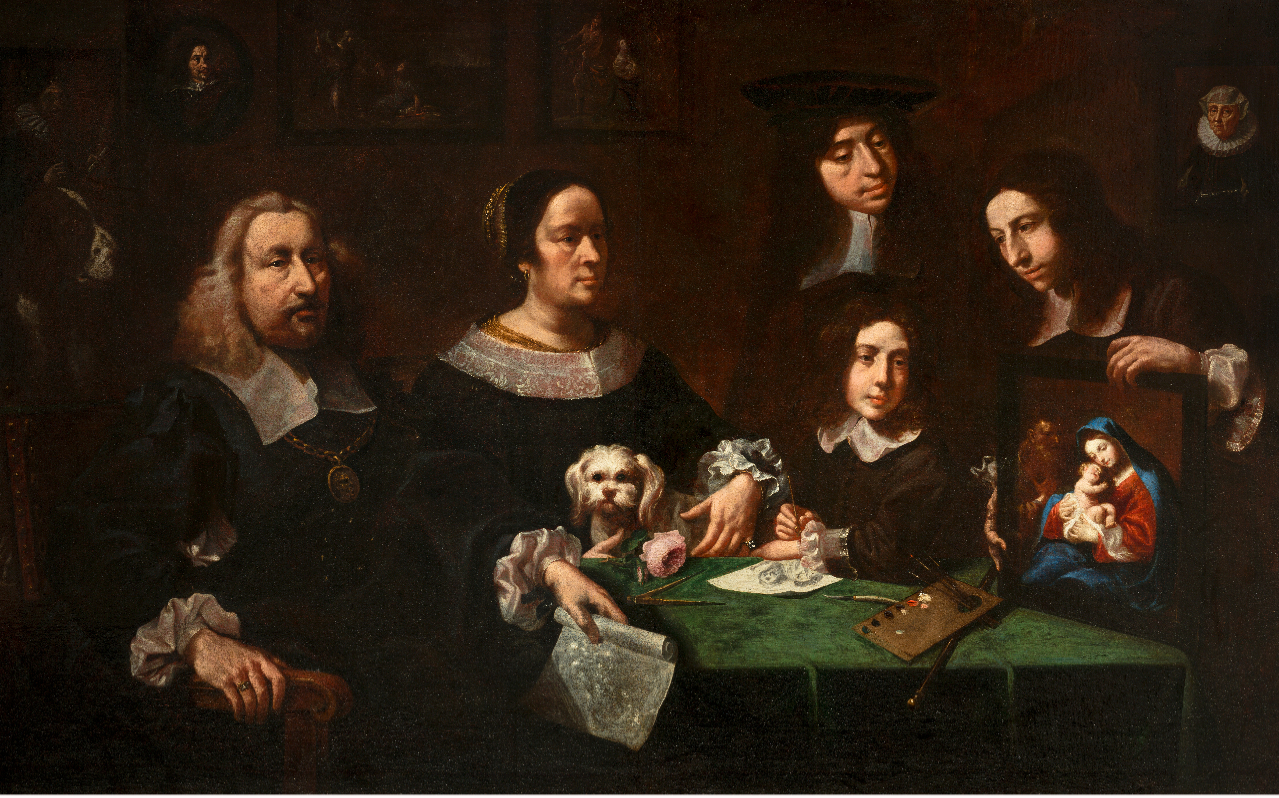
Self-portrait with family

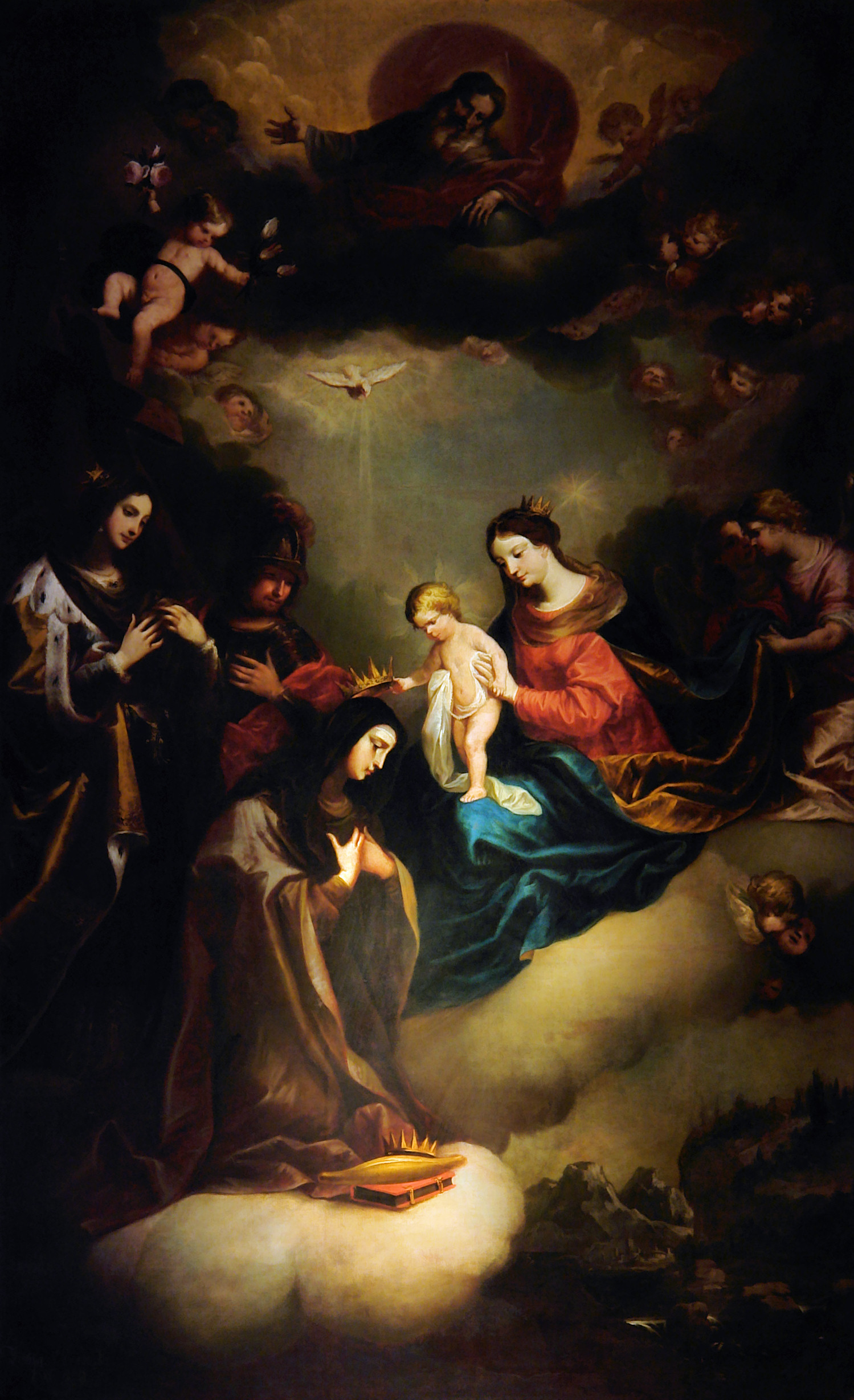
Coronation of Saint Elisabeth of Thüringen by the Virgin Mary and Christ, together with Saint George and Saint Helena (1667).

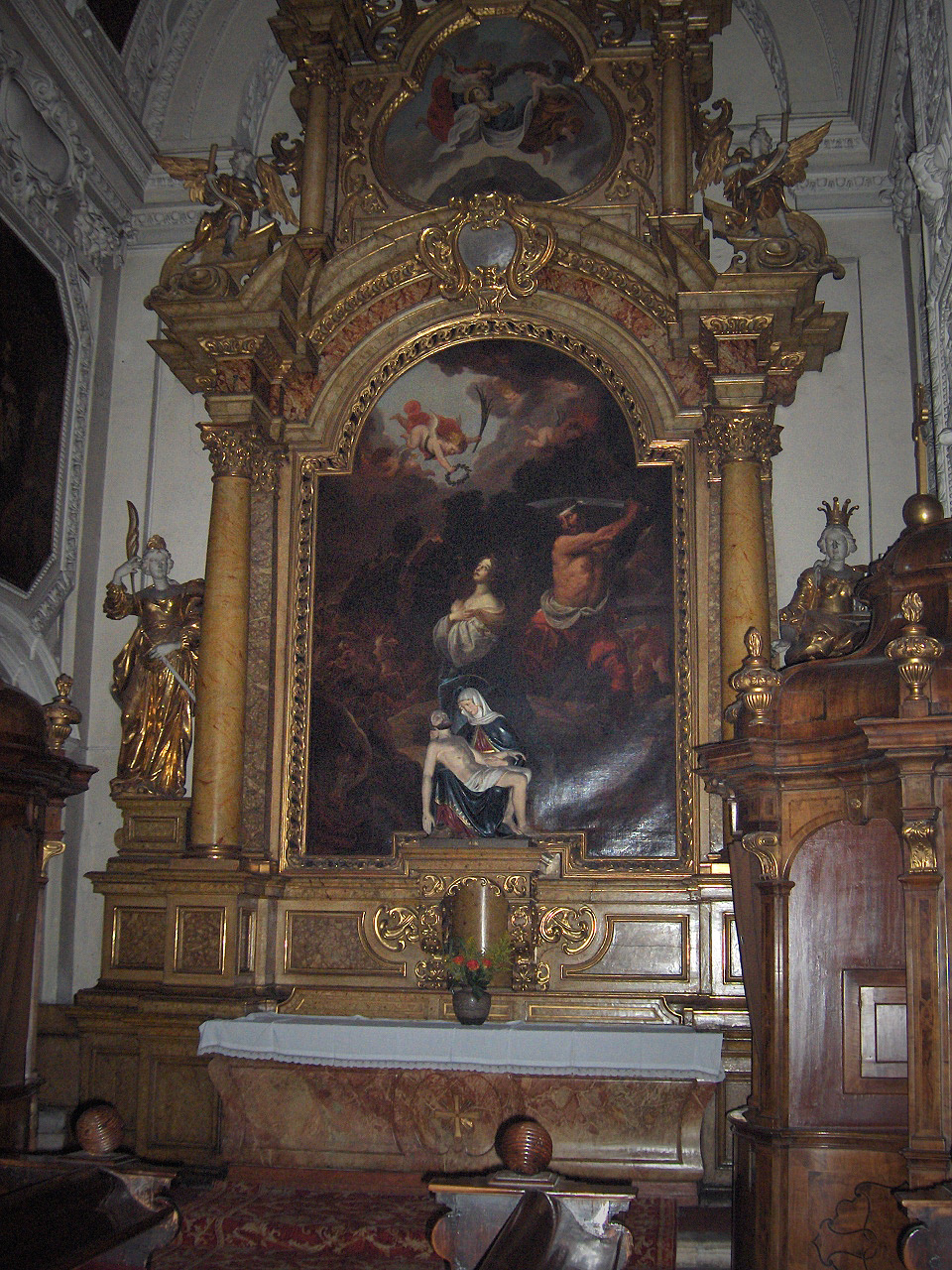
Chapel of St. Catherine of Alexandria, Dominican church, Vienna

Tobias Pock (or Poch, Bock or Pockh) (1609 – 12 June 1683) was an Austrian Baroque painter from Swabian descent, a pioneer of sacral art.

Pock was born in Konstanz, where his father worked as a master at the Cathedral. Tobias Pock probably was an apprentice painter in Southern Germany. He worked mainly at first in Konstanz. But, after his trip to Italy, he settled around 1640 in Vienna, where he became a leading painter. He painted portraits, history canvases and still lifes, but he is mostly recognized for his many paintings of saints in churches in Vienna, Lower Austria, and Steiermark. His style is similar to the contemporary style of Southern Germany (München, Augsburg), but also contains influences from Flanders and Northern Italy. He died in Vienna.

He left a considerable body of work:

- Stephansdom, Vienna: baroque altar painting "The Stoning of St. Stephen"(1640–47) (his earliest known work).
- Dominican church, Vienna:
  - Altar of Saint Dominic: altar painting (1655), depicting the saint adoring the Trinity.
  - Chapel of St. Catherine of Alexandria: altar painting
- Schottenkirche, Vienna: altar paintings Martyrdom of Saint Sebastian (1649/1650), Assumption of Mary (1651/1655) and Saint Benedict (1654)
- Michaelerkirche, Vienna: high altar painting (1642)
- Maria Himmelfahrt basilica, Sankt Pölten: high altar painting Assumption (1658)
- Church of the Teutonic Order, Vienna: high altar painting Coronation of Saint Elisabeth of Thüringen by the Virgin Mary and the Christ Child, together with Saint George and Saint Helena (1667)
- Mariazell Basilica: high altar painting
- Decoration of the altar in the Dominikuskapelle at the Imperial Crypt, Vienna
- Cartesian monastery in Brno-Královo Pole: painting (now substituted by a less valuable picture)
- Svatý Kopeček (Saint Hill) near Olomouc, Basilica Minor, St. Pauline, 1681, Altar of the Chapel of St. Pauline
