= Bergern im Dunkelsteinerwald =

- Municipality
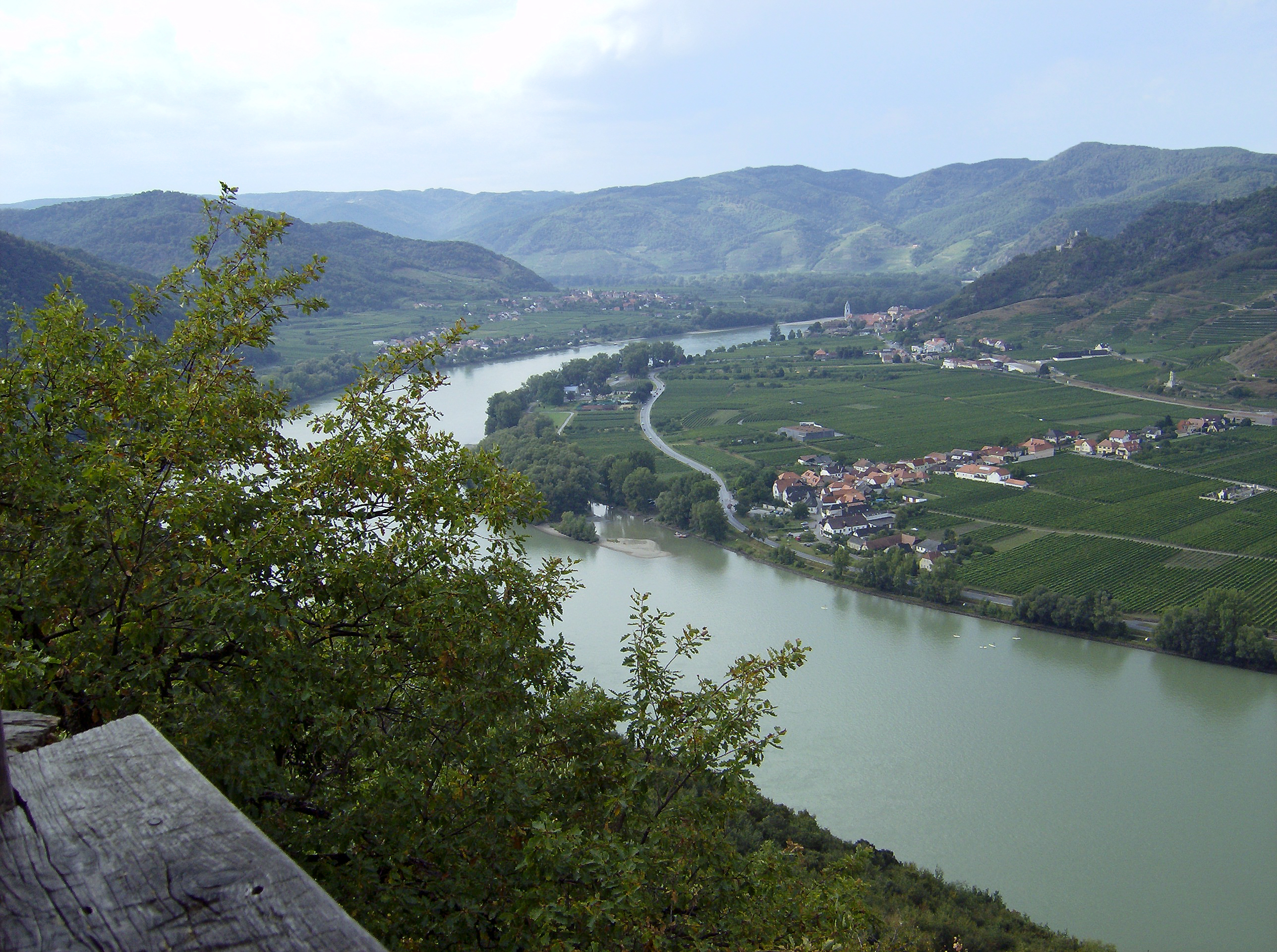
- View of Bergern from the Ferdinandswarte

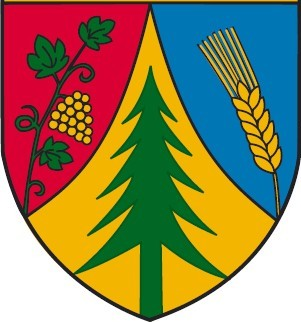
- Coat of arms

- Location within Austria
- Coordinates: 48°22′N 15°33′E
- Country: Austria
- State: Lower Austria
- District: Krems-Land

Government
  - Mayor: Roman Janacek (ÖVP)

Area
  - Total: 36.53 km^{2} (14.10 sq mi)
- Elevation: 305 m (1,001 ft)

Population (2018-01-01)
  - Total: 1,253
  - Density: 34.30/km^{2} (88.84/sq mi)
- Time zone: UTC+1 (CET)
  - Summer (DST): UTC+2 (CEST)
- Postal code: 3512
- Area code: 02714
- Website: www.bergern.at

Bergern im Dunkelsteinerwald is a town in the district of Krems-Land in the Austrian state of Lower Austria.

== Population ==
Historical population
Year	Pop.	±%
1971	1,222	—
1981	1,222	+0.0%
1991	1,240	+1.5%
2001	1,268	+2.3%
2011	1,266	−0.2%
2021	1,299	+2.6%
