= Lukas Haselböck =

Austrian composer and musicologist

Lukas Haselböck (born 11 March 1972) is an Austrian composer, musicologist and singer.

== Life ==
Born in Vienna, Haselböck wrote his music diploma thesis in 1995 on aspects of the string quartets of Reger and Hindemith. He received his doctorate in 1997 with the thesis (printed by Breitkopf & Härtel, Wiesbaden 2000, later taken over by Carus, Stuttgart).

In 1999 Haselböck received his diploma in composition with distinction. Since 2000 he has been assistant professor at the Institute for Analysis, History and Theory of Music at the University of Music and Performing Arts Vienna.

Haselböck's research has focused primarily on the music of the 19th and 20th centuries and has written books on twelve-tone technique, Gérard Grisey as well as on Friedrich Cerha and the phenomenon of timbre. He has composed instrumental and vocal chamber music, as well as several solo concertos and short operas.

As a singer, Haselböck regularly participates in various ensembles.

== Awards ==
- 2019: Niederösterreichischer Kulturpreis – Anerkennungspreis in der Kategorie Musik
