= Orders of Wisdom =

Masonic designation

The Orders of Wisdom (French: Ordres de Sagesse) is the contemporary designation for one of the oldest systems of high Masonic degrees in Free-Masonry. Originally designated as ordres supérieurs, they were codified between 1783 and 1785 by the Chamber of Grades and the Grand Chapter General of France under the impetus of Alexandre Roëttiers de Montaleau, and were subsequently integrated into the Grand Orient de France (GODF) on February 17, 1786. The rituals of the Orders of Wisdom continue the degree of "master", extending and deepening a symbolic and initiatory journey that begins in the "blue lodge". The Orders were originally divided into four initiatory and philosophical orders and a fifth administrative and conservatory order.

The rituals of the superior orders are very old and were gathered from a large body of rituals (over 1400 rituals collected) by a special commission, they are found organized into four Orders, as "Orders of Wisdom" in early texts such as the 1787 Manuscrit de Moûtiers Hauts-Grades du Rite Français and published in 1801 in a compendium entitled Le Régulateur des Chevaliers maçons (The Regulator of Knight Masons) or Les Quatre ordres supérieurs (Four Superior Orders), issued under the authority of the Grand Orient de France.

Today, the Orders of Wisdom are practiced, with local variations, in several Masonic obediences and jurisdictions in Europe and the Americas. Their structure and ritual derive from the 1801 Régulateur des Chevaliers maçons but have been adapted to different historical and doctrinal contexts.

In January 1782, the GODF established a "Chamber of Grades", which initially codified the first three symbolic degrees to standardize the practices of Masonic lodges. This was followed by the creation of the "Grand Chapter General of France" on February 2, 1784. This grand chapter promptly established "General Statutes and Regulations" and "Specific Regulations and Disciplines." Implementing the orders’ codification involved the selection, merging, or elimination of the numerous high-degree rituals practiced in the 18th century. This resulted in the establishment of the four orders of the French Rite between 1784 and 1785. Additionally, the organization of the centralization of high-degree chapters in France was also a consequence of this process. Despite various oppositions, the Grand Chapter General was integrated into the Grand Orient de France on February 17, 1786, thereby establishing a symbolic, philosophical, and initiatory "regime" in three degrees and four orders, within the Grand Orient de France that systematized the main families of high degrees circulating in 18th-century Free-Masonry.

The dissemination of the orders was interrupted by the French Revolution; they reached their peak during the First Empire and underwent a gradual transformation during the 19th century, merging with the practice of the high degrees of the Ancient and the accepted Scottish Rite. This slow transformation led to the suspension of the first three orders in their original forms. After over 100 years of being forgotten, the orders were reactivated in France, starting in 1963. In the second half of the 20th century, the orders were renamed the "Orders of Wisdom."

== History ==
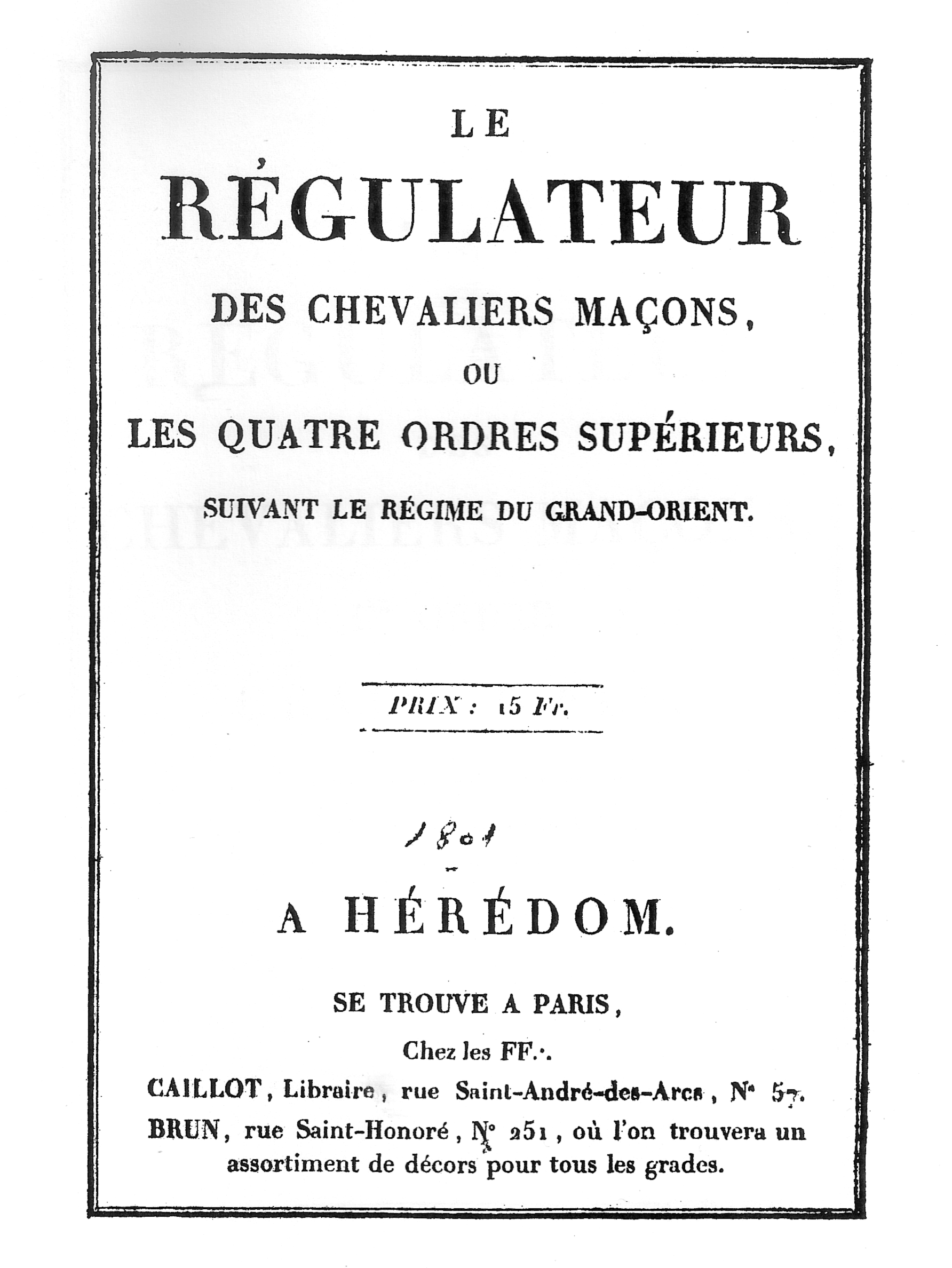
Front cover of the 1801 Régulateur des Chevaliers Maçons.

The internal and profound transformation of the first Grande Loge de France, which became the Grand Orient de France (GODF) in 1773, saw the Masonic obedience devote itself to the organization of symbolic lodges and their centralization. Initially, this process left the issue of high degrees and chapteral lodges practicing them in abeyance. However, by 1780, the Grand Orient established a commission of grades whose low activity revealed the need for specific codification of high degrees. The obedience thus resolved to establish a "Chamber of Grades" to accomplish this task. The chamber members were charged with examining the Masonic practices of the time to establish a version of high-degree rituals that could serve as a common reference. The texts were required to be reliable, without historical approximations, and to establish a usage for the generality of French Freemasons. (Note: Mollier 2017, p. 383) While maintaining the visual elements and symbolic representations of the ceremonies, there was a desire to secularize the 18th-century Masonic rituals to reduce the overly pronounced religious connotations present to some degree. (Note: Mollier 2017, p. 385)

=== Chamber of Grades ===
The establishment of this fourth chamber (Note: The initial three chambers are the administrative chamber, the Paris chamber, and the provincial chamber.) was recorded during the 120th assembly of the GODF on January 18, 1782. The chamber was given a regulation with sixteen articles defining its mission and mode of operation. Article 1 stated that the chamber was responsible for drafting the degrees beyond the three symbolic degrees. (Note: The three degrees of apprentice, companion, and master.) No other chamber of the GODF was authorized to intervene in matters related to high degrees, thereby ensuring a strict separation between the management of symbolic lodges and high degrees.

The chamber of grades comprises three grand officers, three honorary officers, ten officers representing the administrative chambers of Paris and the provinces, and six general officers. It also reserved the right to include venerable masters of lodges who had a deliberative voice. The chamber met twice a month, every other Tuesday. The regulation specified that the officers had no special rank outside this chamber and that they resumed their functions in their workshop or another chamber without any other prerogative. This stipulation remains a constant in the philosophy of the high degrees of the Grand Orient de France as of 2017. The 121st assembly of the Grand Orient, held on February 1, 1782, elected the officers, including Alexandre Roëttiers de Montaleau, the Marquis de Savalette de Langes, and Bacon de la Chevalerie. The first assembly was held on February 19, 1782, during which the statutes were read, the organization's composition was presented, members took the oath, and the governing body was elected. Bacon de la Chevalerie was elected president, de Montaleau orator, and Savalette de Langes, first overseer.

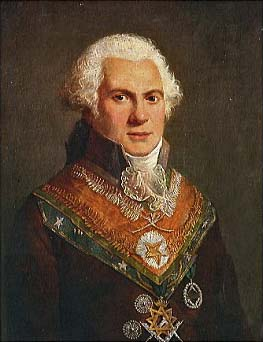
Alexandre-Louis Roëttiers de Montaleau.

In its second session, the chamber engaged in a debate and ultimately determined the methodology for future work. They unanimously endorsed the conclusions of the orator, Roëttiers de Montaleau, who recommended studying the Masonic reality of the time and bringing order to it first, without creating a new system. To do this, it was decided to follow the "known analytical order", which, among the many grades of all kinds in that verbose era, revealed a number recognized by the generality of Freemasons. The methodology proposed by the chamber in its second session served as the foundation for the codification of the high degrees of the Grand Orient of France's rite. To facilitate this process, members were invited to present all the rituals of the elect degrees at upcoming assemblies, analyze them, and provide their observations.

In subsequent assemblies, the elect and Scottish degrees were studied. The 10th assembly of the chamber commenced work on the chivalric degrees, which continued throughout the summer of 1782. Following the study of the chivalric degrees, on August 20, 1782, the "Knight of the Eagle – Rose-Croix" degree was rejected. The members present at this assembly determined that its ceremonies were too similar to religious ceremonies. Despite the proximity of the two degrees, other rituals of the Knight Rose-Croix degree were retained.

From the end of 1782, the work on high degrees slowed down as the chamber of grades received a new mission from the GODF to draft a codification for the first three symbolic degrees. Of the 26 members, only about 10 were very active, driven by Roëttiers de Montaleau, whose knowledge and investment were recognized as crucial by the other members. The work of the Chamber of Grades concluded on February 4, 1783, without the concrete result of codifying the high Masonic degrees. However, the chamber did retain and study 38 high degrees. The codification of the three symbolic degrees was completed, and they were definitively validated during the 149th plenary assembly of the Grand Orient de France on July 15 August 19 and 12, 1785. The codification of the rite was made public in 1801 through the publication of a printer under the name Régulateur du maçon.

=== Grand Chapter General of France ===
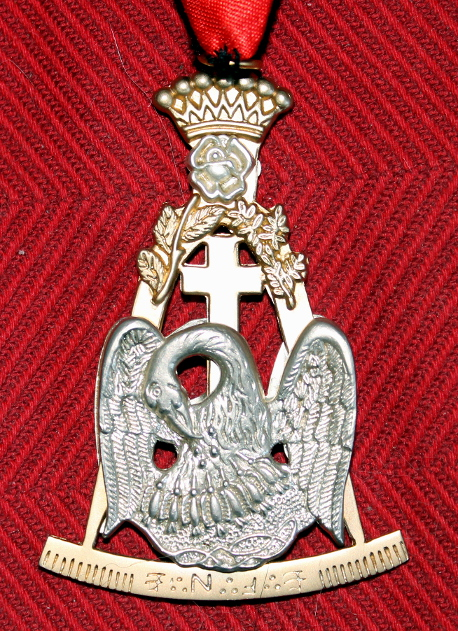
Chevalier Rose-Croix jewel.

The first mention of the existence of a "Grand Chapter General" within the chamber of grades was made through correspondence dealt with during the meeting on November 23, 1784. An inquiry through commissioners tasked with informing about the nature of this suddenly appearing chapter was recorded. This grand chapter was previously born from a circular dated February 2, 1784, notifying its creation by the association of seven sovereign Masonic chapters of Rose-Croix. The seven chapters, collectively known as the "Grand Chapter General of France", were established through the union of the following chapters: "The Meeting of Intimate Friends", "The Intimate Friends", "The United Brothers of Saint Henry", "Of Friendship", "Of Harmony", "Of Solomon", and "Of the Trinity". The newly formed Grand Chapter General of France announced itself as the general assembly of all existing chapters in France. A detailed history of the seven founding chapters and the trajectory of all the founding members, most of whom were officers of the Grand Orient of France, cannot be provided based on the study of known documents from 2017.

This newly established institutional body, which announced its intention to create its statutes and entrusted the task of drafting them to Alexandre Roëttiers de Montaleau, Jean-Pierre Saurine, and Louis Georges Salivet (1735–1805), positioned itself as the federating organ of high Masonic degrees in France. This body was restricted by only admitting lodges that were constituted under the auspices of the Grand Orient de France and that had resolved to draft and codify the high degrees to establish uniformity of practice within the chapters under its jurisdiction.

The individuals assigned to draft the statutes fulfilled their duties expeditiously, and the statutes were adopted on March 19, 1784. The newly established institution explicitly stated, in its inaugural article, its intention to federate the high-degree chapters of the lodges of the Grand Orient and constituted itself as a second chamber of grades. The rationale behind this constitution, which replaced the chamber of grades without consultation and expeditiously, is not elucidated by historians in 2017. Nevertheless, the members of the Grand Chapter General were unequivocal in their desire to integrate the GODF once the codification of the degrees and the administration of the chapters in France had been completed.

From its inception, the Grand Chapter was dedicated to incorporating chapteral lodges within its ranks. Initially, this was achieved through simple letters of affiliation, and subsequently through "letters of constitution", which strengthened its assertion as a federative body of high degrees. Between 1784 and 1788, it united sixty sovereign chapters in France and the dependent territories, which appeared to historians as the first true obedience of high degrees. Despite its obedient function, the Grand Chapter continued to perform all the functions of a chapteral lodge, admitting new members and renowned Freemasonry personalities to reinforce its authenticity. These included Jean Henry Hengelhart, a doctor of medicine and member of the Scottish lodge Mary's Chapel No. 1. (Note: One of the two oldest lodges in the world, whose existence is documented as early as 1599.) Another task of the Grand Chapter was the codification of high degrees, continuing the work of the chamber of grades, and working on finalizing the establishment of the orders of the rite. They resumed the studies and approaches previously undertaken, determining that the four orders were not unique degrees but groupings of degrees that were custodians of a family of rituals. Historical documentation highlights that the work of the Grand Chapter, like that of the chamber of grades, underscored the preeminence of Alexandre Roëttiers de Montaleau in the drafting and establishment of the orders, as well as in the orientations of the Grand Chapter.

=== Union of the Grand Chapter and the Grand Orient of France ===
The project to unite the Grand Chapter and the Grand Orient de France, which was included in the statutes of the Grand Chapter from its inception, was opposed by several lodges and generated intense debates. Opponents of this unification perceived it as an attempt to supplant the symbolic lodges and place the Grand Orient de France (GODF) under the control of the high degrees. According to the opponents, this union would rekindle the disputes between high-degree systems, which had previously led to the dissolution of the first Grande Loge de France. For four years, the opponents worked assiduously to thwart the project. The Grand Chapter made numerous efforts to ensure that the union of the two bodies would strengthen the stability and position of the Grand Orient concerning other high-degree systems. These other systems saw the advantage this union would bring to the central obedience and the weakening of their positions within the Masonic landscape of the time.

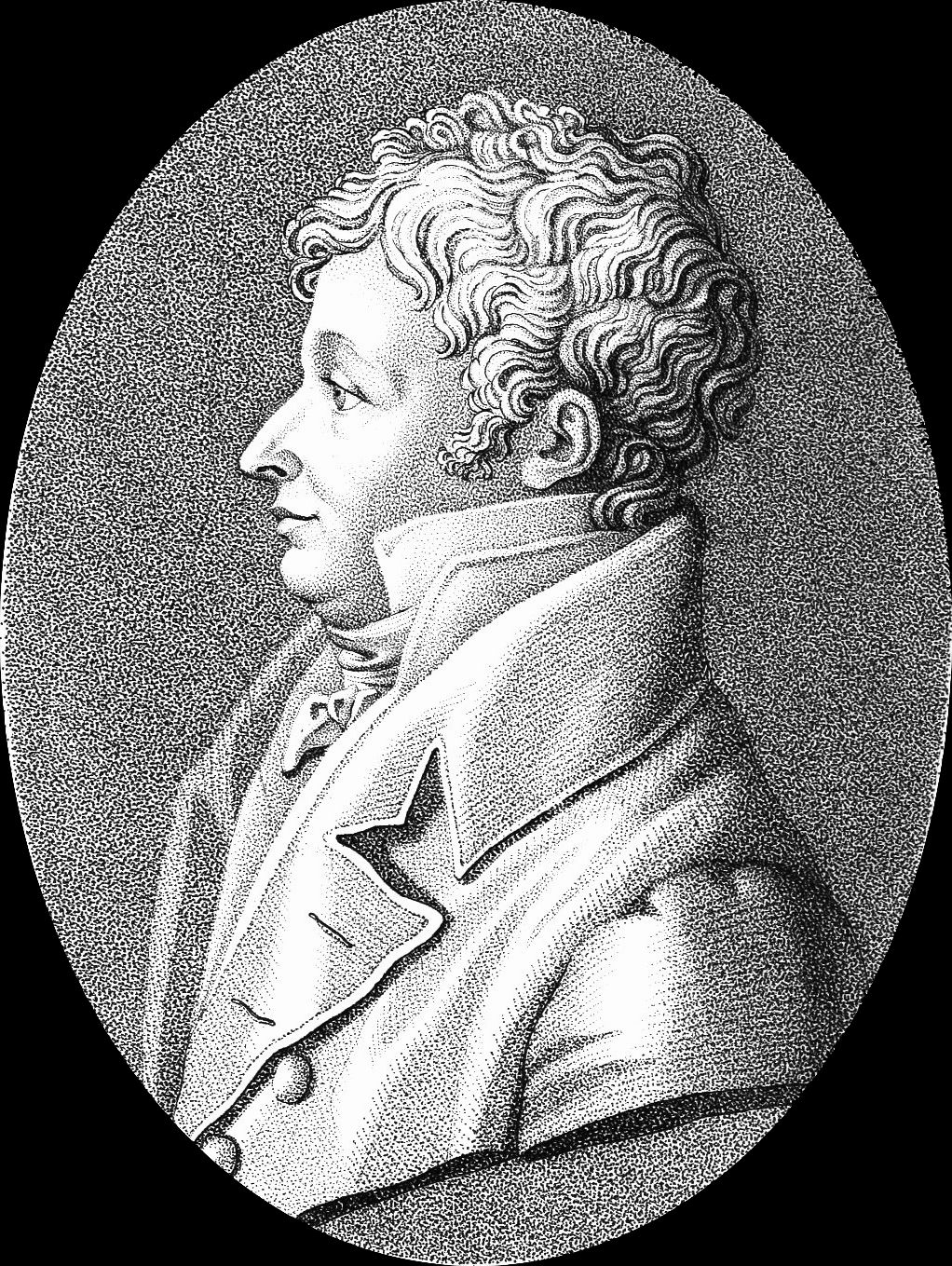
Claude-Antoine Thory.

As the proponents of the union worked towards their goal, two events delayed the integration of the Grand Chapter into the Grand Orient. The first was the sudden appearance of a small group of Freemasons claiming to be the "sole authority in matters of Rose-Croix chapters." Dr. Hubert Gerbier de Werchamp (1727–1795) was the voice of this dissent. He relied on a document dated March 21, 1721, which purported to be the patent of a Rose-Croix chapter granted to the Duke of Antin and transferred to the Count of Clermont. He claimed to have fortuitously inherited this document upon the death of the Grand Master. The document was quickly established (Note: The Rose-Croix degree is only attested in the period between 1750 and 1760. (Note: Bauer & Meyer 2012, p. 110)) as a fabrication by a Masonic decorator at Dr. Gerbier's request and debunked by Claude-Antoine Thory with a long, fact-based argument. Nevertheless, the Grand Chapter proceeded to incorporate the chapter without much questioning. The supposed antiquity of the document, even if fictitious, was a guarantee of legitimacy in 18th-century Freemasonry. This partially explains the smooth integration of the chapter by the officers of the Grand Chapter. This quick integration also removed an obstacle on the path to unification with the Grand Orient, cleverly and pragmatically.

The second challenge to the Grand Chapter's authority over the high degrees in France, aimed at preventing the merger with the Grand Orient, originated from a lodge in Rouen, "L'Ardente Amitié." This lodge sought a response from the Royal Order of Scotland, which confirmed the falsity of the Gerbier patent and additionally granted a patent for the creation of a Provincial Grand Lodge of Heredom of Kilwinning in France to the brothers of the Rouen lodge. This authentic patent constituted a genuine impediment to the unification. In response to what it perceived as a "foreign intrusion" into its internal affairs, the Grand Chapter simply rejected it and marginalized the opponents to the merger, with the majority of the Grand Orient's officers in favor of unification. However, this Provincial Grand Lodge enjoyed some success, counting around twenty chapters for several years. The order resisted the centralization imposed by the Grand Orient until 1806, when Jean-Jacques-Régis de Cambacérès, the Grand Master of the Grand Orient, accepted the honorary title of Grand Master of this order.

With the opposition contained and the desire for union affirmed by both structures, Alexandre Roëttiers de Montaleau presented a first project to the Chamber of Grades on March 22, 1785, during the 52nd assembly of the Grand Orient. The first article specified that the "Grand Chapter will be united and incorporated into the Grand Orient of France", under the title of "Grand Chapter General of the Grand Orient of France." The following four assemblies, held between April and May 1785, were dedicated to examining the general regulations. On May 28, 1785, the chamber concluded favorably on the union of the Grand Chapter and the Grand Orient and submitted the project to the three other chambers of the obedience for acceptance. The debates in each chamber were quite similar, and after each vote, the unification was adopted. Finally, the entire dossier was submitted to the vote of the 167th plenary assembly of the Grand Orient on February 17, 1786. After a final debate, the union was put to a vote, resulting in thirty-nine votes in favor and seven against. Thus, the union of the Grand Chapter General with the Grand Orient de France was adopted.

=== Dissemination before and after the Revolution ===
The Grand Chapter General succeeded in providing the Grand Orient de France with a distinctive and unifying high-degree body. On February 2, 1788, it convened its 58th and final assembly and transferred its responsibilities and authority to the newly established Grand Chapter General of the Grand Orient of France. This body promptly installed all former leaders and members of the Grand Chapter General into a chapter designated as the "Sovereign Metropolitan Chapter." The founding Freemasons continued to act in this chapter in an honorary capacity within the central obedience, their past work has provided a solution to the problems posed by the various high-degree bodies. (Note: The Council of Knights of the East, the Council of Emperors of the East and West, and the Mother Scottish Lodge were also involved.) This centralization also marked the end of the numerous high-degree structures that had existed in the Age of Enlightenment.

After encountering numerous difficulties since 1784 in unifying the rite and the governing bodies, the Grand Orient announced its new doctrine on high degrees in a circular dated February 19, 1789, a few months before the French Revolution began. The events and upheaval of the Revolution, and the subsequent dormancy of Freemasonry, did not allow the newly constituted regime to fully deploy in the lodges and chapters of France. Following the revolutionary upheaval, the French or Modern Rite was most widely deployed under the First Empire. The revival of Freemasonry also saw the immediate reactivation of the four orders codified before the Revolution. Napoleon's centralism facilitated the Grand Chapter of the Grand Orient's administration of nearly 500 chapters at the height of the Empire. This centralization did not prevent disputes, which were further exacerbated in 1804 by the emergence of the Ancient and Accepted Scottish Rite and its extensive scale of high degrees. This rite included in its thirty degrees the old degrees synthesized in the more austere codification of the four orders of the French Rite, which had also excluded degrees based on the Masonic Templar myth, which was still deeply rooted in the tradition of many Freemasons. Despite the emergence of new competition, the high-degree system established by the Grand Orient was implemented. Its position was further strengthened by a concordat that "united" the new rite with it in December 1804. (Note: Mollier 2017, p. 116)

=== Transformation ===
Although predating the creation of the thirty-three-degree high-degree system of the Ancient and Accepted Scottish Rite (AASR), the original practice of the higher orders according to the Regulator of Knight Masons was modified in France in the second half of the 19th century. This transformation occurred smoothly, with the Scottish degrees incorporating the four orders of the French Rite equivalent to the 9th, 14th, 15th, and 18th degrees of the Scottish Rite. (Note: Bauer & Meyer 2012, pp. 116–117) (Note: Mollier 2017, p. 117)

Following the unification agreement, the management of the two high-degree rites was conducted in parallel. The Grand Chapter General of the Grand Orient was not specifically dedicated to the superior grades of the French Rite but to those higher than the symbolic lodges. From 1805 onwards, it assumed responsibility for the four orders of the French Rite and the first eighteen degrees of the Scottish Rite. Consequently, it established both French and Scottish chapters similarly, thanks to the sovereignty granted by the Concordat, up to the Rose-Croix degree, which was identical in both rites. (Note: Fourth Order of the French Rite and Eighteenth Degree of the Scottish Rite.) Until 1814, the Supreme Council of the 33rd Degree in France, created by the Concordat, held sovereignty over the Scottish degrees from the 19th to the 33rd degree. In 1815, a portion of the Supreme Council opted to merge with the Grand Orient to implement a comprehensive reorganization of the Scottish Rite. The Grand Chapter subsequently transformed into the "Supreme Council of Rites", offering Freemasons who had achieved mastery the option to continue their journey either within a French chapter practicing the four superior orders or in a Scottish chapter following the same sequence (9th, 14th, 15th, and 18th), with the intermediate grades communicated orally. Subsequently, Knights or Sovereign Princes Rose-Croix were permitted to join a Kadosh Knight Council (30th degree) and then a 32nd-degree Consistory of the Scottish Rite.

The divergence in practice continued to narrow as the French orders and intermediate Scottish degrees fell into disuse. Masters then proceeded directly to the Rose-Croix degree, which was identical in both rites at that time. (Note: Mollier 2017, p. 118) The dormancy was also due to the nature of the fifth order of the French Rite, which had only a conservation and administrative function, in comparison to the allure of the 32nd and 33rd degrees of the Scottish Rite, which were regarded as "ultimate" degrees, especially once they were conferred upon imperial dignitaries from 1805 onwards. The majority of French Rite chapters then sought to combine rites to also use the terminal high degrees of the Scottish Rite, employing them as ultimate degrees of a "new regime", which remained seven degrees despite everything. (Note: The remaining sequence is as follows: apprentice, companion, master, Knight Rose-Croix (18th), Knight Kadosh (30th), 32nd, and 33rd.)

In 1858, the "Murat Ritual" acknowledged the necessity for change, formalizing the scale of the "new" high degrees in the rituals. This formalization resulted in the cessation of the practice of the first three orders in their original form, without presenting it as a change of rite but as an accession to a supplement. This formalization led to the dormancy of the practice of the Orders of Wisdom in their original form in 1862.

=== Renewal ===
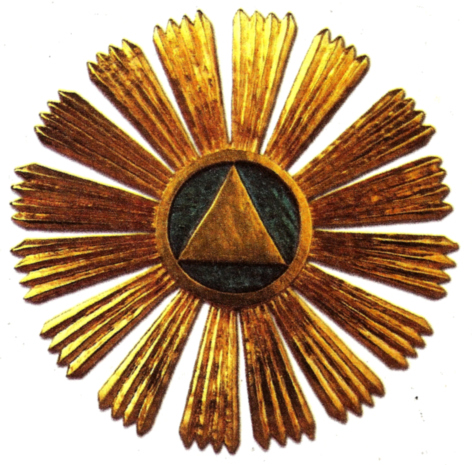
Seal of the GCG of the GODF-RF in the 21st century.

One hundred and fifty years after the disappearance of the Grand Chapter General of the French Rite, and after more than a century of oblivion, the orders in their entirety were reactivated in France and more generally in Europe starting in 1963. (Note: Bauer & Meyer 2012, p. 118) They then took the name "Orders of Wisdom" in the second half of the 20th century. (Note: Bauer & Meyer 2012, p. 124) This revival was conceived primarily as a historical and ritual restoration effort based on surviving 18th-century manuscripts and scholarly studies of the Orders of Wisdom.

The initiative of several masons, including René Guilly, led to an attempt to revive the high degrees of the French Rite. According to Cahier des Chevaliers Maçons (Notebook of Knight Masons), the four orders of the original rite, which had not been practiced in France since 1862 in their original forms, reappeared for the first time on November 30, 1963. Guilly and a group of twelve other masons established the Jean-Théophile Desaguliers chapter in Neuilly-sur-Seine and initiated the practice of the Orders of Wisdom in their original form.

In 1970, Roger d'Almeras, who succeeded René Guilly as the head of the "Jean-Théophile Desaguliers" chapter, established the inter-obedience chapter "La Chaine d'Union", which in 1977 in Lille, intending to transmit the orders of the French Rite, installed the "Grand Chapitre Magistral du Grand Globe Français." On September 2, 1979, some masons bearing the orders of the French Rite (including Jean Abeille, Albert Rouyath, (Note: Albert Rouyat was one of the founders of the Jean-Théophile Desaguliers chapter, which was established by René Guilly.) Raymond Bouscarle, René Calaman, and René Bianco). The "Grand Chapitre de Provence" was established, and on October 22, 1986, the chapter "Lou Calen" was installed in Cabriès in Provence. This chapter was intended to be integrated eventually into the Grand Orient of France.

In 1994, the "Grand Collège des Rites" reactivated the Modern French Rite within itself and established a college of the rite. (Note: The first five chapters of the college's correspondence are as follows: "Lou Calen, Rosa Mystica, The Disciples of Solomon, Paracelsus, and The Age of Man." (Note: Révauger & Marcos 2015, p. 293)) In anticipation of reintegration into the GODF, the "Lou Calen" chapter and the ten chapters that followed its creation signed a request for integration into the "Grand Collège des Rites", committing to only group GODF lodges in the future. This occurred on March 25, 1995. In 1995, in Lyon, they established a "Grand Chapter General of the French Rite" within the "Grand Collège des Rites of the Grand Orient of France", thereby initiating the revitalization of the French Rite in three grades and four orders within the original framework of the French Rite. (Note: Révauger & Marcos 2015, p. 115)

On March 16, 1996, the Grand Chapter General of the French Rite was officially reactivated within the Grand Collège des Rites. During the ceremony, official patents were issued to 19 so-called "historic" chapters in order of their creation, thus enabling them to become founding members of the new jurisdiction. (Note: The "Lou Calen" chapter in the east of Aix-en-Provence is attributed to Patent No. 001, which originated from the Grand Chapter of Provence and was created in June 1986. This chapter is the oldest of the chapters in the history of the reactivation of orders within the GODF. (Note: Révauger & Marcos 2015, p. 149)) (Note: Révauger & Marcos 2015, p. 116) Three years later, the foundation of an independent jurisdiction by the GODF was formalized on May 17, 1999. On September 3, 1999, the plenary assembly of the obedience delegated the Grand Chapter General to administer and manage the chapters of the French Rite autonomously. This body was named the "Grand Chapter General of the GODF – French Rite." (Note: Révauger & Marcos 2015, p. 197)

The practice of a fifth order, whose specific history during the 18th and 19th centuries elucidates its administrative and conservatory role, which only had a brief existence and did not form part of the "phylum" of the transmission of the Orders of Wisdom, was officially constituted by the Grand Chapter General of the Grand Orient de France on September 24, 1999.

Since that time, the practice has been carried out in its traditional form, or a third-millennium form according to the terminology of the Grand Orient of France. Additionally, various obediences and jurisdictions around the world have adopted this practice, thereby restoring it to its place within all high-grade Masonic rites. These rites have preserved the oldest traditions of speculative Freemasonry, derived from the "Rite of the Moderns", as well as the chivalric traditions of the 18th century. (Note: Mollier 2017, p. 124)

== Fixation of the four orders ==
The Grand Chapter General established the orders according to two simultaneous axes that might appear to be in opposition but did not create difficulties in Masonic practice. The first axis decreed that the orders are not grades but groups of grades and that each order contains all the grades of the same family, becoming their custodian. The second axis, announced since the creation of the Grand Chapter, asserted that all high degrees must be written more simply and that their practice must be standardized. The outcome of this endeavor was the formulation of a ritual for each order.

The handwritten copies of the rituals of the Superior Orders were published in a volume titled Régulateur des Chevaliers Maçons in 1801. They proposed a system in four orders, following the sequence: Secret Elect, Grand Scottish Elect, Knight of the Orient, Sovereign Prince Rose-Croix. Each order synthesized the most important symbolic elements of the family of grades it comprised, incorporating them into its ritual. The fixation fell within the "known analytical order" previously established in the Chamber of Grades, with the Grand Chapter finalizing the works carried out by the latter through a second reading. The rituals also described the organization of the places and decorations in the opening pages of the ritual of each order, as well as that of the "lodge board" specific to each order. It was specified that "it will be drawn with chalk on the floor and erased each time." (Note: This practice is rapidly superseded by the establishment of "permanent boards," which are furnished with tracing board carpets that are rolled out on the floor.)

The Orders of Wisdom represent a continuation of the Master grade, offering a further development of its principles. They are based on the legend of Hiram, the architect of Solomon's Temple, and the circumstances of his death. The first two orders provide answers to questions that the Master grade does not address. The third order evokes the reconstruction of the destroyed temple, long after the death of King Solomon. It is in the tradition of chivalric grades that began in 1736 with the discourse of the Chevalier de Ramsay. He linked masons to the Crusades and the Knights of Saint John of Jerusalem, distancing them from the operative tradition. The fourth and final order, also chivalric, revolves around a new "Word" and a spiritual and inner construction rather than a material one. The initiatory journey of the French Rite in the 18th century places its quintessence and finality in the fourth order. The fifth order, as described in the general statutes of the Grand Chapter General in 1784, serves as an administrative conservatory for all the grades and Masonic systems in use at that time, representing a total of 81 grades.

== Admission and progression through the Orders of Wisdom ==
In the French Rite, admission to the Orders of Wisdom is traditionally selective and only by invitation. It is not allowed for a Master Mason to request admission. Candidates are generally identified and proposed by members who have observed their conduct over time, commitment to symbolic Free-Masonry, discretion, regularity of attendance and willingness to undertake sustained initiatic study. This invitational character distinguishes the Orders of Wisdom from systems in which advancement beyond the grade of Master Mason may be obtained primarily through application or successive conferrals. Selection is intended to recognize maturity and constancy rather than social standing or the desire to accumulate additional titles. Admission is therefore presented as both an honour and an obligation to continue the work begun in the symbolic lodge.Progression through the four Orders is deliberately gradual. Advancement depends upon regular participation, personal study, reflection upon the preceding Order and the presentation of written work and memorization of catechism. The complete progression may consequently require approximately seven to ten years, although the precise duration varies according to the rules and customs of each chapter and governing body however there is a minimum of one-year in-between grades.

The Orders of Wisdom seek to grow in quality not in membership.

The rarity of the Orders, their selective mode of admission and the length of their progression have contributed to their reputation as one of the more prestigious systems within traditional Free-Masonry. This prestige is not intended to imply superiority over other rites. Within the philosophy of the French Rite, the Orders are understood not as honorary decorations but as the organic completion of the work of the Master Mason and of the seven-grade structure established during the eighteenth century. Humility and fraternity is a cornerstone of the French Rite.

=== Overview ===
The French Rite consists of a complete system of three degrees plus four orders, seven total, called an organized in two distinct categories: the three "blue" or craft degrees worked in symbolic lodges, and four additional philosophical degrees known as the Orders of Wisdom (Ordres de Sagesse) worked in chapters. This structure was formally established between 1784 and 1786 when the Grand Orient de France (GODF) codified the rituals and established the Grand Chapitre Général.

Historical organization of the four Orders
Order	Historical designation	English designation	Codification	Ritual family represented
First Order	Élu, Maître Élu or Élu Secret	Secret Elect	1783-1784	Elect-grade traditions
Second Order	Grand Élu Écossais	Grand Elect Écossais	1784	Écossais and perfection-grade traditions
Third Order	Chevalier d’Orient	Knight of the Orient	1785	Chivalric and rebuilding traditions
Fourth Order	Chevalier de l’Aigle, Parfait Maçon Libre, also known as Rose-Croix	Knight of the Eagle, Free and Perfect Mason, commonly known as Rose-Croix	1786	Rose-Croix traditions and conclusion "Nec Plus Ultra" of the initiatory progression

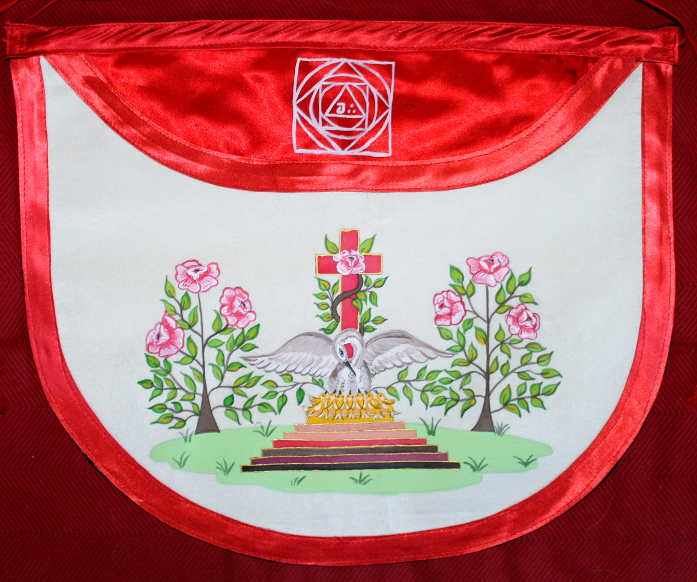
4th Order Apron

== Specific history of the Fifth Order ==
The codification by the Chamber of Degrees left numerous degrees unaddressed. The statutes of the Grand General Chapter formalize the creation of a Vth order for the conservation and study of rituals on the one hand and an "administrative chamber" on the other. This order originally lacked a specific apron or lodge board, as its administrative and conservatory role did not align with the tradition and initiatory lineage of the Orders of Wisdom. The 1784 statutes describe its functioning as that of a "correspondence office." It is composed of 27 members who work on the preparation of everything concerning the management of chapters, new affiliations, the notebooks of orders, and internal relations. The records of this assembly do not mention any form of ritual or any officer post during their work, which is nevertheless opened and closed during the assemblies.

The integration of the Supreme Council of the Ancient and Accepted Scottish Rite (SC-REAA) in 1806 prompted the former dignitaries of the Grand General Chapter of France, gathered within the Metropolitan Sovereign Chapter, to attempt to reactivate the Vth order, which had fallen into disuse following the French Revolution. Roëttiers de Montaleau began to delineate the evolution of this conservatory order comprising 81 patrimonial degrees, which could restore the splendor of the post-4th order degrees, as well as the French Rite, in the face of the allure of the final degrees of the SC-REAA, which were frequented by the elite of the Napoleonic regime. However, Roëttiers de Montaleau, who was incapacitated by illness, was unable to complete the project of reallocating the Vth order. He died on January 30, 1808. In February of that year, other members of the Metropolitan Sovereign Chapter, along with Montaleau's son, resumed the project of reforming the order. (Note: Mollier 2017, p. 102)

The order was reactivated in 1808 and adopted statutes and regulations in 28 articles that detailed its role. These statutes were based on the initial general statutes of 1784 of the Grand General Chapter of France. The administrative dimension of managing high degrees that had been returned since the integration of the latter into the Grand Chapter of the Grand Orient focused on the conservation and study of Masonic knowledge. (Note: Mollier 2017, p. 104) Therefore, the Fifth order contains "all the physical and metaphysical degrees of all systems in force" (in the 18th century). This ensemble represents the entirety of the French Masonic tradition of 1784. Brothers Gastebois and Lelièvre-Villette, knowledgeable about the rituals, originated the classification of the 81 degrees composing this tradition into nine series, whose original notebooks are stored in an "ark." (Note: The appellation alludes to the Ark of the Covenant and is intended to commemorate the sacred object that preserves the rituals. (Note: Mollier 2017, pp. 109–110)) They are classified as follows: (Note: Bauer & Meyer 2012, pp. 112–113)

- 1st series: the most primitive degrees;
- 2nd series: the degrees of elect;
- 3rd series: the intermediate degrees without posterity;
- 4th and 5th series: the Scottish degrees that served as a model for the IInd order;
- 6th series: The Chivalric Degrees; and
- 7th series: Rose-Croix and the 8th series: Knight of the Temple, Knight of the Sun;
- 9th series: the alchemical, hermetic, or other degrees.

The latest iteration of the Vth order has adopted a monochromatic aesthetic, with white serving as the primary color. This is evident in the sash worn by members and the hangings adorning the temple walls during work. (Note: Mollier 2017, p. 106) The order's organizational structure is centered around a "Council of Nine", which plays a pivotal role in its governance. Additionally, there is a class designated as the "proselytes", whose responsibilities include enriching the archives and addressing Masonic history and symbolism-related inquiries. (Note: Mollier 2017, p. 105) The primary objective of the members was to collect and comprehend Freemasonry, a task analogous to that of the Philalethes, of which Alexandre Roëttiers de Montaleau served as secretary from April to June 1787 and later as session president during the final months of their convocation. (Note: Mollier 2017, p. 109) The order employs a reception ritual that incorporates a historical discourse, which is read to all members of the ritual. This discourse delineates the order's vocation and position. The discourse is presented as a distinction rather than a degree, and it is recalled that the French Rite has no higher degree than the 4th Order, which is described as the nec plus ultra of the rite. This distinction is conferred upon all Sovereign Princes Rose-Croix who hold a position in the Grand Chapter at the time of their obligation.

Nevertheless, its activity declined, and a significant number of dignitaries ceased participation in its operations. It experienced an initial disruption from 1810 to 1811. In February 1811, it renamed itself the "Supreme Council" and attempted to resume its meetings, but this attempt proved unsuccessful. Consequently, it fell into disuse for a year and a half. (Note: Mollier 2017, pp. 110–111)

From 1812 to 1813, the dignitaries of the Vth order attempted to reactivate its work to transform it into a true "Supreme Council of the oldest known rite in France" and a jurisdiction of the Grand Orient of France. Despite this renewed activism, this Supreme Council remained inactive for several months. On June 1, 1813, it held its last meeting. Following the admission of a few new members, the body once again lapsed into inactivity. On September 20, 1815, the Ancient and Accepted Scottish Rite was reorganized within the Grand Orient of France, forming a "Grand Consistory of Rites." In 1826, the Grand Consistory of Rites became the Grand College of Rites, assuming responsibility for degrees beyond the 18th degree of the Scottish Rite or the IVth order of the French Rite. Finally, the Metropolitan Sovereign Chapter, which had presided over this final order of the French Rite for a few years, transformed into the Knight Kadosh, thereby bringing to an end the existence of the conservatory order of the French Rite for nearly 150 years. (Note: Mollier 2017, pp. 112–113)

== See also ==
- Grande Loge Nationale Française
- Grand Orient de France
- Masonic manuscripts

== Bibliography ==
- Mollier, Pierre (2017). Les hauts grades du Rite français : Histoire et textes fondateurs. Renaissance traditionnelle (in French). Paris: Éditions Dervy. ISBN 979-10-242-0223-5.
- Révauger, Cécile; Marcos, Ludovic (2015). Les Ordres de Sagesse du Rite français : Au cœur de la franc-maçonnerie libérale, des Lumières au xxie siècle (in French). Paris: Éditions Dervy. ISBN 979-10-242-0115-3.
- Marcos, Ludovic (2012). Histoire illustrée du Rite français (in French). Paris: Éditions Dervy. ISBN 978-2-84454-944-0.
- Bauer, Alain; Meyer, Gérard (2012). Le Rite français. Que sais-je? (in French). Paris: Presses Universitaires de France. ISBN 978-2-13-058197-0.
- Darche, Claude (2011). Vade-mecum des Ordres de Sagesse du Rite français (in French). Paris: Éditions Dervy. ISBN 978-2-84454-645-6.
- Mainguy, Irène (2003). Symbolique des grades de perfection et des ordres de sagesse (in French). Paris: Éditions Dervy. ISBN 2-84454-224-7.
- Dachez, Roger; Mollier, Pierre; Porset, Charles; Marcos, Ludovic (2004). Les Grades de Sagesse du Rite français : histoire, naissance & renaissance (in French). Paris: À l'Orient. ISBN 2-912591-15-5.
- Ligou, Daniel (1987). Dictionnaire de la franc-maçonnerie (in French). Paris: Presses Universitaires de France. ISBN 2-13-048639-8.
- Vigier, Hervé (2002). La renaissance du Rite Français traditionnel (in French). Paris: Ed. Télètes. ISBN 978-2-906031-55-5.
- Vigier, Hervé; van Win, Jean; Duhal, Jean Pierre; Bodez, Hervé (2014). Le Rit primordial de France : dit Rite français ou moderne (in French). Paris: Ed. Téletès. ISBN 978-2-906031-96-8.
- Grand Chapitre Général du Grand Orient de France (2010). La Franc-maçonnerie du siècle des Lumières, Le régulateur du IIIe Millénaire, Rite Français Rituels de référence (in French). Paris: Ed. Véga. ISBN 978-2-85829-661-3.
- Castelli, Joseph, ed. (2002) [1786]. Rite français 1801. Le Régulateur du Maçon. Les trois premiers grades et les quatre ordres supérieurs. À Hérédom, l'an de la G.'. L.'. 5801 d'après le manuscrit de 5783 (in French). Paris: Éditions A l’Orient. ISBN 978-2-912591-19-7.
- Mollier, Pierre (1998). "Le grand Chapitre général de France et la fixation du Rite français". Renaissance Traditionnelle (in French) (105-106 – 115-116).
- Mucchielli, Alain (2024). Re-naissance du 5e ordre (in French). Preface by Roger Dachez. Éditions de la Tarente. ISBN 978-2-494823-14-3.
