= Claude-Antoine Thory =

French court official, naturalist and Masonic historian (1759–1827)

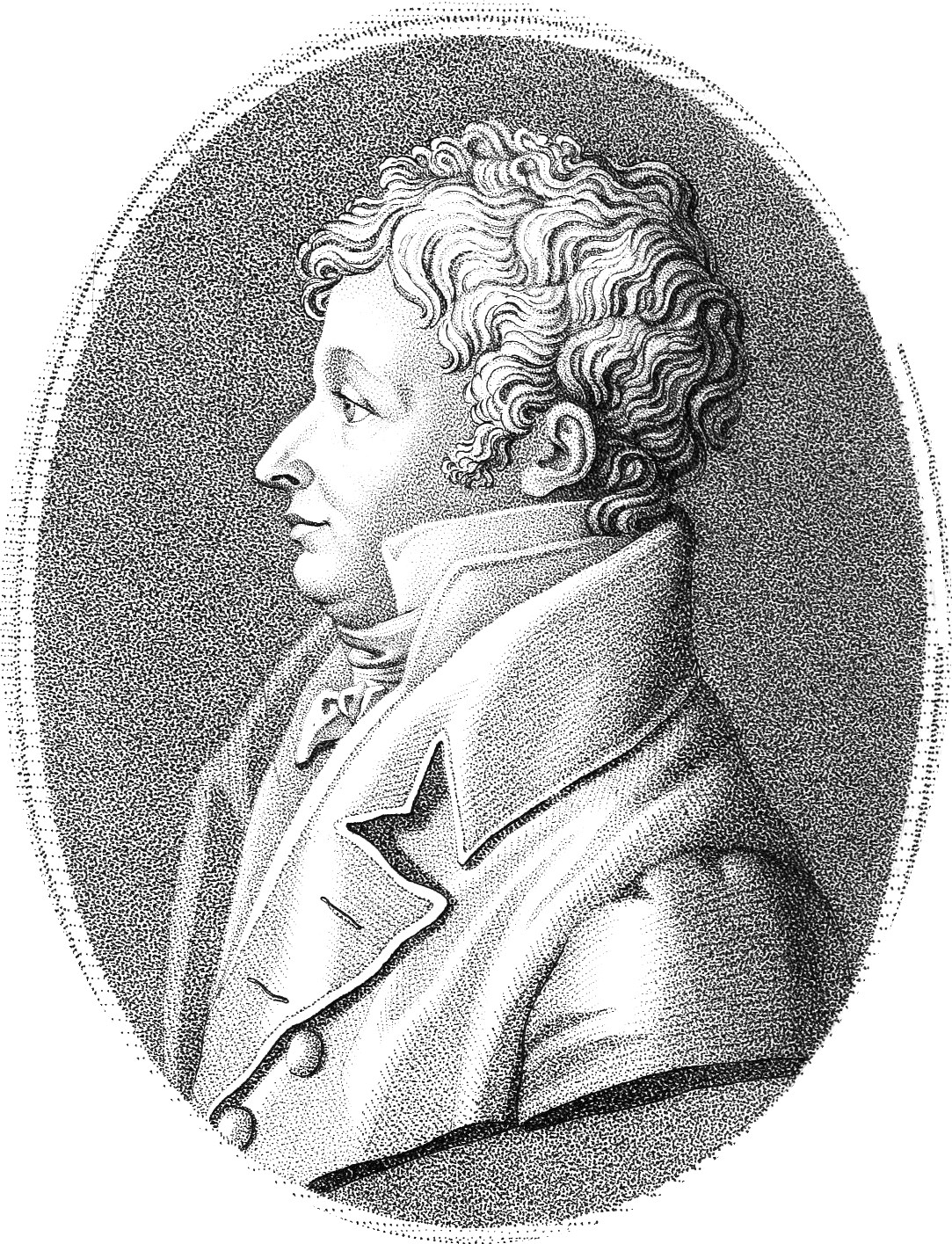
- Claude-Antoine Thory, 1820
- Born: 26 May 1759; Paris, Kingdom of France
- Died: 22 October 1827 (aged 68); Paris, Kingdom of France
- Occupations: Court official, naturalist, Masonic historian
- Known for: Acta Latomorum; history of the Grand Orient de France; botanical text of Les Roses

Claude-Antoine Thory (26 May 1759 – 22 October 1827) was a French court official, naturalist, collector and historian of Free-Masonry in France. Active in Parisian Free-Masonry from the 1780s into the nineteenth century, he became closely associated with the lodge Saint-Alexandre d'Écosse, the Mère Loge Écossaise de France and the Rite Écossais Philosophique.

Thory is particularly known for two early works of Masonic historiography: Annales originis magni Galliarum O. : ou Histoire de la fondation du Grand Orient de France, published in 1812, and the two-volume Acta Latomorum, published in 1815. His writings drew on printed works, lodge records, correspondence and private Masonic collections, some of which were subsequently dispersed.

Outside Free-Masonry, Thory was a recognised amateur botanist specialising in roses. He wrote the botanical text accompanying Pierre-Joseph Redouté's celebrated three-volume Les Roses, published between 1817 and 1824, and produced several independent botanical works on the genus Rosa.

== Early life and legal career ==
Claude-Antoine Thory was born in Paris on 26 May 1759 and was baptised on 28 May. His date of birth is established by archival research based on documentation produced when he entered the judicial administration of the Châtelet.

The authority record of the Bibliothèque nationale de France retains the older date 1757 in its heading, although the same record notes the 26 May 1759 date given in contemporary biographical material.

Thory completed legal studies and was described in contemporary Masonic records as an avocat en parlement. Specialist archival research indicates, however, that he did not practise as an advocate before the Parlement of Paris and that his name does not appear in the rolls of its bar.

In 1786, he purchased the office of greffier commis ancien et triennal in the criminal chamber of the Châtelet of Paris. His royal letters of provision were dated 23 August 1786; he was accepted by the company of clerks on 29 August and entered office on 1 September.

The judicial reforms of the French Revolution abolished the institutions of the old Châtelet and consequently brought this office to an end.

== Free-Masonry ==
=== Saint-Alexandre d'Écosse ===
Thory was initiated into Free-Masonry on 25 May 1784 in the Parisian lodge Saint-Alexandre d'Écosse.

He quickly became active in the administration of the lodge. During 1784 he temporarily exercised the office of orator, and on 16 January 1785 he was formally elected to that office. He also became involved in the organisation and preservation of the lodge's archives.

On 30 April 1785, Saint-Alexandre d'Écosse appointed Thory as its representative to the Grand Orient de France. On 13 February 1787 he was elected Venerable Master of the lodge.

His continuing interest in archives, rituals and the history of the various Masonic systems became one of the principal features of his later activity.

=== Rite Écossais Philosophique ===
Saint-Alexandre d'Écosse was associated with the Rite Écossais Philosophique, or Philosophical Scottish Rite (REP), a Masonic system that developed in France during the eighteenth century and maintained a particular interest in additional grades, hermetic traditions and the comparative study of initiatory systems, the rite contained 12 degrees.

Following the disruption of Masonic activity during the French Revolution, Thory participated in the revival of this Masonic current. During the First French Empire, he became one of the principal organisers of the Rite Écossais Philosophique and the Mère Loge Écossaise de France.

In 1806, the activities associated with Saint-Alexandre d'Écosse and Le Contrat Social were brought together under the name Saint-Alexandre d'Écosse et le Contrat Social Réunis, with Thory serving as Venerable Master.

Thory's importance within this system was particularly connected with its archives, intellectual programme and historical collections rather than with the creation of the Rite itself.

=== History of the Grand Orient de France ===
In 1812, Thory published:

Annales originis magni Galliarum O. : ou Histoire de la fondation du Grand Orient de France et des révolutions qui l'ont précédée, accompagnée et suivie, jusqu'en mil sept cent quatre-vingt-dix-neuf.

The book attempted to trace the institutional history of the French Grand Lodge and the conflicts and reorganisations which culminated in the establishment of the Grand Orient de France in 1773. It also contained appendices reproducing or discussing documents relating to French lodges, additional grades and Masonic systems.

The work remains an important early source for the history of French Free-Masonry, but its assertions are generally compared by modern historians with surviving eighteenth-century archives and later scholarship.

=== The Gerbier patent and the French Rite ===
Thory's writings also preserve important material concerning the history of the additional grades later associated with the French Rite.

During the eighteenth century, the physician Pierre-Louis Gerbier produced a document purportedly dating from 1721 which claimed to demonstrate the existence of an early Rose-Croix authority in France. The document later became involved in controversies concerning the organisation of the additional grades and the Grand Chapitre Général de France.

In the third appendix to his 1812 history, Thory reproduced the Latin text of the alleged patent and a French translation and devoted an extended discussion to challenging its authenticity.

Modern research likewise regards the so-called Gerbier patent of 1721 as apocryphal.

Thory was not one of the eighteenth-century codifiers of the French Rite. His importance to its history is principally historiographical: he preserved information concerning the Grand Orient, the Grand Chapitre Général, eighteenth-century additional grades and the disputes surrounding their organisation.

=== Acta Latomorum ===
In 1815, Thory published his principal Masonic reference work:

Acta Latomorum, ou Chronologie de l'histoire de la Franche-Maçonnerie française et étrangère.

Published in two volumes, the work attempted to establish a chronological record of events in French and foreign Free-Masonry through 1814.

It included information concerning:

Grand Lodges and Grand Masters; French and foreign Masonic rites; systems of additional grades; the Strict Observance; the Élus Coëns; the Philalèthes; the Rite Écossais Philosophique; lodge and chapter foundations; Masonic legislation and prohibitions; Cagliostro and related controversies; and a bibliography of Masonic publications.

Because Thory had access to private and institutional collections that were later dispersed, the Acta Latomorum became an important documentary source for later Masonic historians.

Some of its dates, interpretations and historical traditions have since been revised, and modern historians generally distinguish between information independently confirmed by archival evidence and material reproduced by Thory from earlier Masonic authors.

== Translation of Alexander Lawrie ==
In 1813, Thory published a French translation of a work attributed to Scottish Masonic author Alexander Lawrie, concerning the history of Free-Masonry and the Grand Lodge of Scotland.

The translation formed part of Thory's broader effort to make foreign Masonic historical material available to a French-speaking readership.

== See also ==
- French Rite
- Grand Orient de France
- Grand Chapitre Général de France
- Rite Écossais Philosophique
- Pierre-Joseph Redouté
- Alexandre Lenoir
- Alexandre Roëttiers de Montaleau
- Jean-Jacques Bacon de La Chevalerie
- Charles-Pierre-Paul Savalette de Langes
- Free-Masonry in France
