= Demosthenes (disambiguation) =

Demosthenes (384–322 BC) was a prominent Greek statesman and orator of ancient Athens.

Demosthenes may also refer to:

- Demosthenes (general), Athenian general
- Demosthenes Philalethes, ancient physician
- Demosthenes the Laconian, Olympic winner in 316 BC
- George Savalas or Demosthenes, actor who appeared on Kojak
- Valentine Wiggin or Demosthenes, a character in Ender's Game
- Demóstenes (footballer) (1892–1961), Demóstenes Correia de Syllos, Brazilian footballer

== See also ==
- Demosthenian Literary Society, a society at the University of Georgia in Athens, Georgia, United States
