= Holmi (Phrygia) =

Town of ancient Phrygia

Holmi or Holmoi (Ancient Greek: Ὅλμοι) was a town of ancient Phrygia. It is mention by Strabo as lying on the main road from Carura to Lycaonia near that road's entry into the mountainous region.

Its site is unlocated.
