= Aristoxenus (physician) =

1st-century BC Greek physician

Aristoxenus (Gr. Ἀριστόξενος) was a Greek physician of Asia Minor who was quoted by Caelius Aurelianus. He was a pupil of Alexander Philalethes and contemporary of Demosthenes Philalethes, and must therefore have lived around the 1st century BC. He was a follower of the teachings of Herophilos, and studied at the celebrated Herophilean school at the village of Men-Carus, between Laodicea and Carura. He wrote a work Περὶ τῆς Ἡροφίλου Αἱρέσεως (On the Herophilean Sect, Latin: De Herophili Secta), of which the thirteenth book is quoted by Galen, but which is no longer extant.
