= Le Régulateur du Maçon =

- Original title: Le Régulateur du Maçon
- Language: French
- Subject: Free-Masonry, French Rite, Masonic ritual
- Genre: Ritual manual
- Publisher: [s.n.]
- Publication date: Title-page date 5801 [1801]
- Publication place: France

Le Régulateur du Maçon (English: The Regulator of the Mason) and its companion work, Le Régulateur des Chevaliers Maçons, ou les Quatre Ordres supérieurs suivant le régime du Grand-Orient, are the principal printed ritual collections associated with the eighteenth-century codification of the French Rite. Together they preserve the three symbolic degrees—Entered Apprentice, Fellow Craft and Master Mason—and the four additional Orders of Wisdom, organised during the 1780s by the Grand Chapitre Général de France.

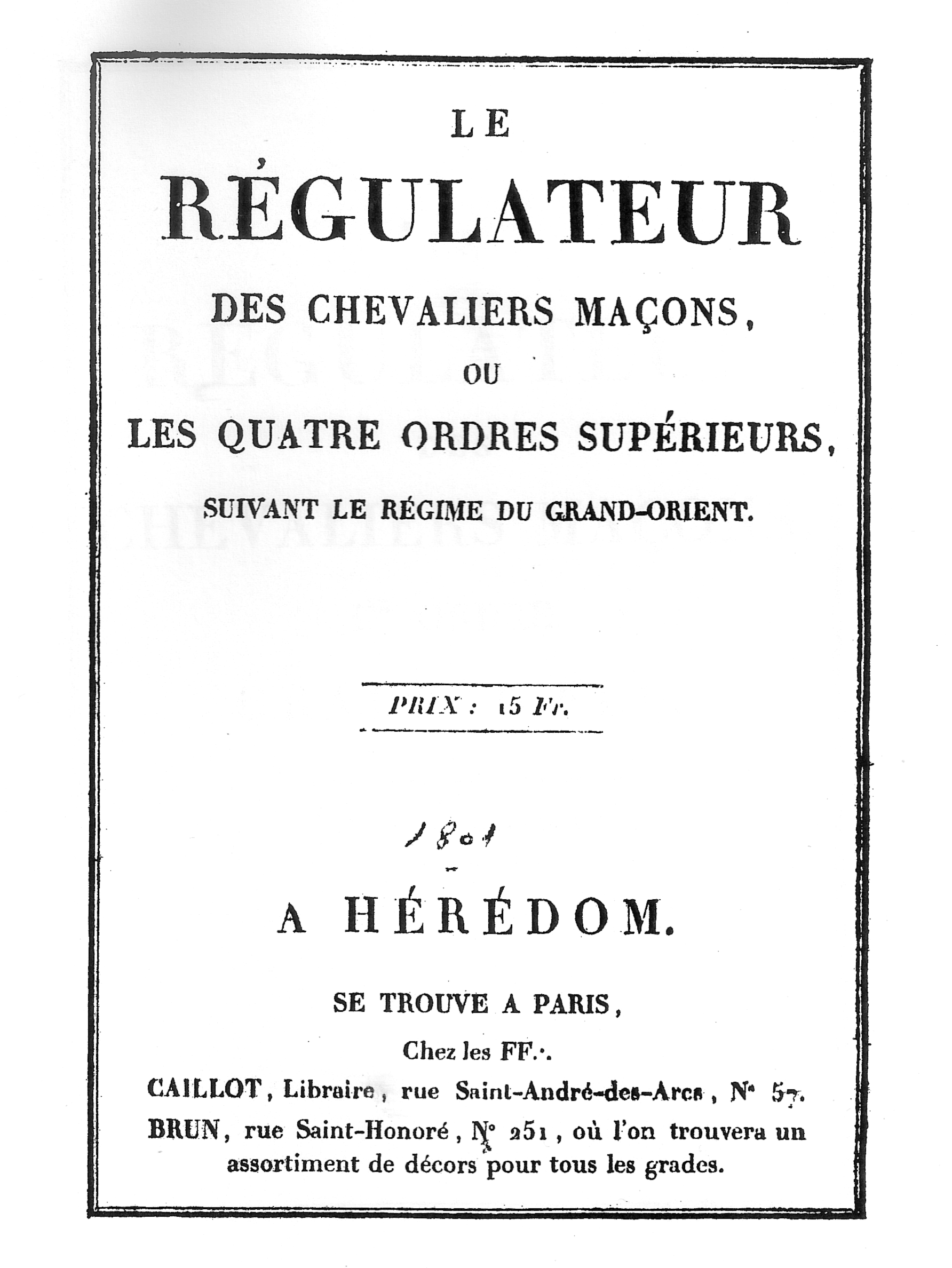
Front cover of the 1801 Régulateur des Chevaliers Maçons.

The two works correspond to the two principale components of the historical French Rite. The Régulateur du Maçon contains the rituals of the three symbolic degrees, while the Régulateur des Chevaliers Maçons contains the rituals of the four Ordres supérieurs, later commonly known as the Orders of Wisdom.

The symbolic rituals were formally approved by the Grand Orient de France in 1785 after a codification process begun in 1773. The higher Orders were organised separately by the Grand Chapitre Général during the same period and were incorporated into the institutional structure of the Grand Orient de France in 1786.

The surviving printed Régulateur du Maçon bares the Masonic date 5801, corresponding to 1801, and is conventionally catalogued under that date. Modern historical research, however, places the actual printing and circulation of the symbolic Régulateur in 1803.
