= Philosophical Scottish Rite =

Masonic rite

The Philosophical Scottish Rite (French: Le Rite Ecossais Philosophique) is a Masonic rite that was established in Paris in 1776 by the hermetist Alexandre Boileau, who was a disciple of Antoine-Joseph Pernéty. This rite is known for its unique structure and progression through various degrees.

== History ==
The Philosophical Scottish Rite was founded in Paris, France, in 1776. It was established by Alexandre Boileau, a pupil of Antoine-Joseph Pernéty, an influential figure in the realm of esoteric and hermetic knowledge. The rite was associated with the lodges "Le Contrat Social" and "Saint Lazare."

=== Degree system ===
The rite comprises 12 distinct grades or degrees, each with its own symbolism and teachings:

- 1st to 3rd Degree: Chevalier de l'Aigle Noir or Rose + Croix d'Hérédom de la Tour (Black Eagle Knight or Rose + Heredom Tower Cross) - divided into 3 parts.
- 4th Degree: Chevalier du Phénix (Knight of the Phoenix).
- 5th Degree: Chevalier du Soleil (Knight of the Sun).
- 6th Degree: Chevalier de l'Iris (Knight of the Iris).
- 7th Degree: Vrai Maçon (True Mason).
- 8th Degree: Chevalier des Argonautes (Knight of the Argonauts).
- 9th Degree: Chevalier de la Toison d'Or (Knight of the Golden Fleece).
- 10th Degree: Grand Inspecteur Parfait Initié (Grand Perfect Initiated Inspector).
- 11th Degree: Grand Inspecteur Parfait Initié (Grand Perfect Initiated Inspector).
- 12th Degree: Sublime Maître de l'Anneau Lumineux (Sublime Master of the Luminous Ring). The 12th grade was derived from the Rite des Négociates, the academy of the Sublime Masters of the Luminous Ring, which was absorbed by the Philosophical Scottish Rite in 1784 and by the Atelier de Douai: La Parfaite Union. Several members held the highest degrees of Misraïm. Notable members included Jean-Baptiste Méallet, Etienne-François Bazot and Jean-Marie Ragon, who reached the 90th degree.

In 1817, the Philosophical Scottish Rite transformed into "The Nicotiniates Rite" and adopted a structure consisting of 4 grades:

=== The Nicotiniates Rite ===
- 1st Degree: Ecouteur or Akousmatikos (Listener or Akousmatikos).
- 2nd Degree: Pyrophores (Firebearers).
- 3rd Degree: Adeptes (Adepts).
- 4th Degree: Elus (Chosen Ones).

Despite these changes, a parallel Masonic structure of High Degrees continued to exist.

== Discrepancies and Clarifications ==
One historical account has raised questions regarding the accuracy of the founding and naming of the rite. It was argued that the transformation of "Le Contrat Social" into an "Ecossaise lodge" was not conducted by Alexandre Boileau but by Jean Antoine Deleutre, a member of the Lodge St Jean d’Ecosse de la Vertu Persécutée in Avignon. The initiation of the lodge into an Ecossaise body may have been influenced by a disciple of Pernety, Dr. Bouge, who served as the Worshipful Master. Furthermore, it has noted that the rite was more closely related to the AASR (Ancient and Accepted Scottish Rite) and comprised 13 degrees.

== See also ==
- Freemasonry
- List of Masonic rites
