= Henry William Chandler =

English classical scholar (1828–1889)

Henry William Chandler (31 January 1828 – 16 May 1889) was an English classical scholar.

== Life ==
Henry William Chandler was the only son of Robert Chandler, of London, and was born in London on 31 January 1828. His early education was neglected, but by diligent study in the Guildhall Library he acquired enough Greek and Latin to enable him to matriculate at Oxford on 22 June 1848. On 8 December 1851, he took a scholarship at Pembroke College, of which on 4 November 1853 he was elected fellow, having graduated B.A. (first class in literæ humaniores) in the preceding year. He proceeded M.A. in 1855, was for some years lecturer and tutor at his college, and held the Waynflete professor of moral and metaphysical philosophy from 1867 until his death.

After the publication of an inaugural lecture, The Philosophy of Mind: a Corrective for some Errors of the Day, London, 1867, 8vo, he confined himself to oral teaching. His favourite topic was the Nicomachean Ethics, of which his exposition was acute and stimulating. He lived the life of a scholarly recluse, devoted to the study of Aristotle and his commentators, and is understood to have amassed copious materials for an edition of the master's Fragments, in which he was unhappily forestalled by the German scholar, Valentin Rose.

In 1884, he was appointed curator of the Bodleian Library. An enthusiastic bibliophile, he began his accession to office by a strong protest against the practice of lending the rare printed books and manuscripts preserved in that venerable repository. By way of alternative, he proposed the reproduction of texts by photography, and is said to have had an Arabic manuscript thus copied for Sir Richard Burton at his own expense. As a scholar, he was distinguished by vast, minute, and recondite learning and immense laboriousness. His knowledge of the Greek commentators on Aristotle was unique; and his failure to leave any monument worthy of his powers was due partly to his extreme fastidiousness, partly to chronic ill-health. Throughout the greater part of his life he was a prey to insomnia, which in his later years induced the fatal habit of taking chloral in enormous quantities.

He died in Oxford on 16 May 1889 from the effects, as certified by inquest, of a dose of prussic acid administered by himself at Pembroke College.

His books and manuscripts he left to Mrs. Evans, wife of the master of Pembroke, and she by a deed of gift dated 17 October 1889 gave them to the college on condition that they were preserved as a separate collection.

== Works ==
Chandler's best work is unquestionably his Practical Introduction to Greek Accentuation, of which The Elements of Greek Accentuation is a synopsis; but the depth and variety of his erudition were hardly less conspicuous in his Miscellaneous Emendations and Suggestions.

He also made two valuable contributions to the bibliography of Aristotle:

- A Catalogue of Editions of Aristotle's Nicomachean Ethics, and of Works illustrative of them printed in the Fifteenth Century; together with a Letter of Constantinus Paleocappa, and the Dedication of a Translation of Aristotle's Politics to Humphrey, Duke of Gloucester, by Leonardus Aretinus, hitherto unpublished, Oxford, 1868, 4to.
- Chronological Index to Editions of Aristotle's Nicomachean Ethics, and of Works illustrative of them from the Origin of Printing to the Year 1799, Oxford, 1878, 4to.
