= Charles-Pierre-Paul Savalette de Langes =

French royal treasury official, philanthropist and Free-Mason (1745–1797)

- Born: 1745; Tours, Kingdom of France
- Died: 11 December 1797; Paris, French Republic
- Occupations: Magistrate, royal treasury official
- Known for: Founder of Les Amis Réunis and organiser of the Philalèthes

Charles-Pierre-Paul Savalette de Langes (1745 – 11 December 1797), frequently styled the Marquis de Savalette de Langes in Masonic and historical literature, was a French magistrate, royal treasury official, philanthropist and Free-Mason. He was one of the prominent organisers of the French Rite during the final decades of the Ancien Régime.

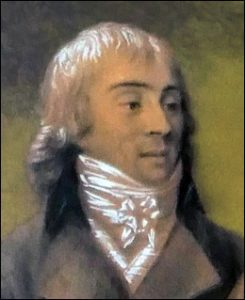

Savalette founded a lodge named Les Amis Réunis at Rumigny in 1771 and re-established it in Paris in March 1773. The Paris lodge became the centre of an extensive programme of Masonic and esoteric research which developed into the system of the Philalèthes, or “Friends of Truth”.

He also participated in the establishment and early administration of the Grand Orient de France. In 1782 he was elected first overseer of its Chamber of Degrees, alongside Jean-Jacques Bacon de La Chevalerie and Alexandre Roëttiers de Montaleau. The chamber formed part of the institutional process which eventually contributed to the codification of the French Rite, although surviving evidence does not identify Savalette as the author of the rituals adopted by the Grand Orient.

Outside Free-Masonry, Savalette held senior positions in the royal financial administration, participated in philanthropic institutions, and remained involved in public finance during the first years of the French Revolution.

== Free-Masonry ==
=== Initiation ===
Savalette was initiated into Free-Masonry on 15 May 1766 by the lodge Les Amis Indissolubles in Lille.

His early Masonic activities remain imperfectly documented. His enforced residence at Rumigny, however, coincided with the creation there of the first lodge bearing the name Les Amis Réunis.
