= Alexander Philalethes =

1st-century BC Greek physician

Alexander Philalethes (Ancient Greek: Ἀλέξανδρος Φιλαλήθης) was an ancient Greek physician, whom Priscian called Alexander Amator Veri (Alexander Truth-Lover), and who was probably the same person quoted by Caelius Aurelianus under the name of Alexander Laodicensis. He lived probably towards the end of the 1st century BC, as Strabo speaks of him as a contemporary. He was a pupil of Asclepiades of Bithynia, succeeded an otherwise unknown Zeuxis as head of a celebrated Herophilean school of medicine, established in Phrygia between Laodicea and Carura, and was tutor to Aristoxenus and Demosthenes Philalethes. He is several times mentioned by Galen and also by Soranus, and appears to have written some medical works, which are no longer extant. The view, once current, that Alexander's Areskonta served as a doxographical basis for such authors as Anonymus Londinensis, Aetius the doxographer, Soranus of Ephesus, and Anonymus Bruxellensis is an inference on the basis of flimsy evidence.
