= Philalethes =

Philalethes (Greek: φιλαλήθης, philaléthēs, pronounced [filalétɛːs]) was an Ancient Greek name, also often adopted in pseudonyms (based on its literal translation, "lover of truth"). It may apply to:

- Philalethes, book by Severus of Antioch
- Alazonomastix Philalethes, pseudonym of Henry More
- Alexander Philalethes
- Demosthenes Philalethes
- Eirenaeus Philalethes, alchemical writer, now usually identified with George Starkey
- Eugenius Philalethes, alchemical writer, now usually identified with Thomas Vaughan (philosopher)
- Irenaeus Philalethes, pseudonym of Lewis Du Moulin
- Philalethes Cantabrigiensis, pseudonym of James Jurin
- Philalethes, pen-name of William Hazlitt
- Philalethes, pseudonym of John of Saxony as translator of Dante's Divine Comedy
- Philalethes, pen-name of Henry Portsmouth, author of an index to William Penn's works (1730)
- Philalethes is a character in Humphry Davy's Consolations in Travel (1830)
- Phlogophoros Philalethes, current day(21st century) Philosopher

== See also ==
- Philalethes Society, Masonic organization
