= Masonic myths =

Myths present in masonic rites and ranks

Masonic myths occupy a central place in Freemasonry. Derived from founding texts or various biblical legends, they are present in all Masonic rites and ranks. Using conceptual parables, they can serve Freemasons as sources of knowledge and reflection, where history often vies with fiction. They revolve mainly around the legendary stories of the construction of Solomon's temple, the death of its architect Hiram, and chivalry. Some of the original mythical themes are still part, to a greater or lesser extent and explicitly, of the symbols that make up the corpus and history of speculative Freemasonry. Some myths, however, have had no real posterity, but can still be found in some high grades, or in the symbolism of some rituals. Others borrow from the medieval imagination or from religious mysticism, and do not bother with historical truths to create legendary filiations with vanished guilds or orders.

== Myths and Freemasonry ==
Myths in Freemasonry appear to be fundamental elements in the construction of ideas and feelings that are transmitted within the corpus of Masonic lodges and Freemasons. They contribute to their expression and ensure continuity for each Freemason, between the rite, practices and Masonic culture. As with other mythologies, the importance and quality of the combination of story elements is greater than the facts themselves. As a result, there is no one true or official version of Masonic myths, their richness often deriving from the multitude of possible interpretations. (Note: Hivert-Messeca (2017), pp. 9–11)

They follow a certain chronological narrative, which is completed with more or less marked variations, the fundamental principles repeating themselves regularly. Three great myths make up the main corpus of speculative Freemasonry: that of the construction of the temple, which, without assuming a primordial place, offers continuity and centrality; that of the legend of Hiram, which stems from the possibility for Freemasonry to reach an anthropological universal and remains the main legend of Freemasonry; and that of medieval chivalry, with its human values of solidarity, loyalty and virtue. (Note: Hivert-Messeca (2017), p. 13)

The main point to emerge from all the Masonic myths is that the legends make use of targeted psychological research "tools" that revolve mainly around moral and spiritual self-improvement, self-building, brotherhood and death. The myths are linked, as they evolve, by a heroic figure who is never mentioned at first, and who unfolds in Masonic rituals. (Note: Vincent (2017), pp. 137–138) This heroic figure is portrayed and staged by the recipient at the first grade initiation ceremony, and the other degrees deepen this process by bringing out biblical heroes who link the degrees together, energizing and fertilizing the imagination and personal research. (Note: Vincent (2017), p. 139)

== Main myths ==
=== The construction myth ===
The myth of construction is consubstantial with Freemasonry; it draws part of its symbolism from the history of various constructions, real or legendary, such as the pyramids, the Tower of Babel, the Temple of Jerusalem or cathedrals. While the model of Solomon's temple is the one adopted by Masonic mythology, the construction practiced by speculative Freemasons is part of a broader movement that historian Yves Hivert-Messeca described in 2017 as "Masonic constructivism". This constructivism is based on the principles of building, deconstructing and freely rebuilding a man or woman, a spiritual edifice and a better world, all at the same time. The myth thus takes two complementary directions, one epistemological, philosophical and spiritual, the other cultural, philanthropic and critical. This myth, with its multiple and adaptable interpretative force, proposes a set of interpretations to be patiently worked out, alone or with others. (Note: Hivert-Messeca (2017), pp. 12–15)

The construction myth does not appear in the anciens devoirs (old charges) of the Regius manuscript (1390), where King Solomon is mentioned only once. The Cooke manuscript (1410), on the other hand, offers a mythological account that became the basis of the operative legend of Solomon's temple. This vulgate is taken up almost identically by the Grand Lodge n°1 manuscript (1583) and the Watson manuscript (1687). The Drumfries manuscript (1710) and the Graham manuscript (1726) follow the same pattern, adding details to emphasize the Christian character and religiosity of the mythical tale. (Note: Cavaignac (2016), pp. 127–128)

In the first edition of Anderson's constitutions in 1723, the myth appropriates biblical elements, but proposes the purpose of the construction as the building of a "place of prayer for all nations", giving a dimension of universality to the temple that tends to join Masonic universalism. In the 1738 edition, the Masonic character of the myth and construction is accentuated by making Solomon the Grand Master Mason in Jerusalem, and the construction and its protagonists are showered with numerous virtues. The 1738 edition recovers biblical writings without concern for historical veracity, with the aim of glorification, anteriority and legitimization. (Note: Cavaignac (2016), pp. 128–129)

In the 18th century, the myth of construction around the Masonic temple was used to create a space for inter-denominational exchange and debate. The constitutions evoke the idea of a building site where the search for the supposed vestiges of Masonry and the transmission of a distant Masonic tradition by the Freemasons of the premier Grand Lodge of England served to invent a language made up of signs and words of recognition, as well as a word that enabled the protagonists of the building site to recognize each other, to work and to continue the work in harmony.

=== The myth of Hiram ===
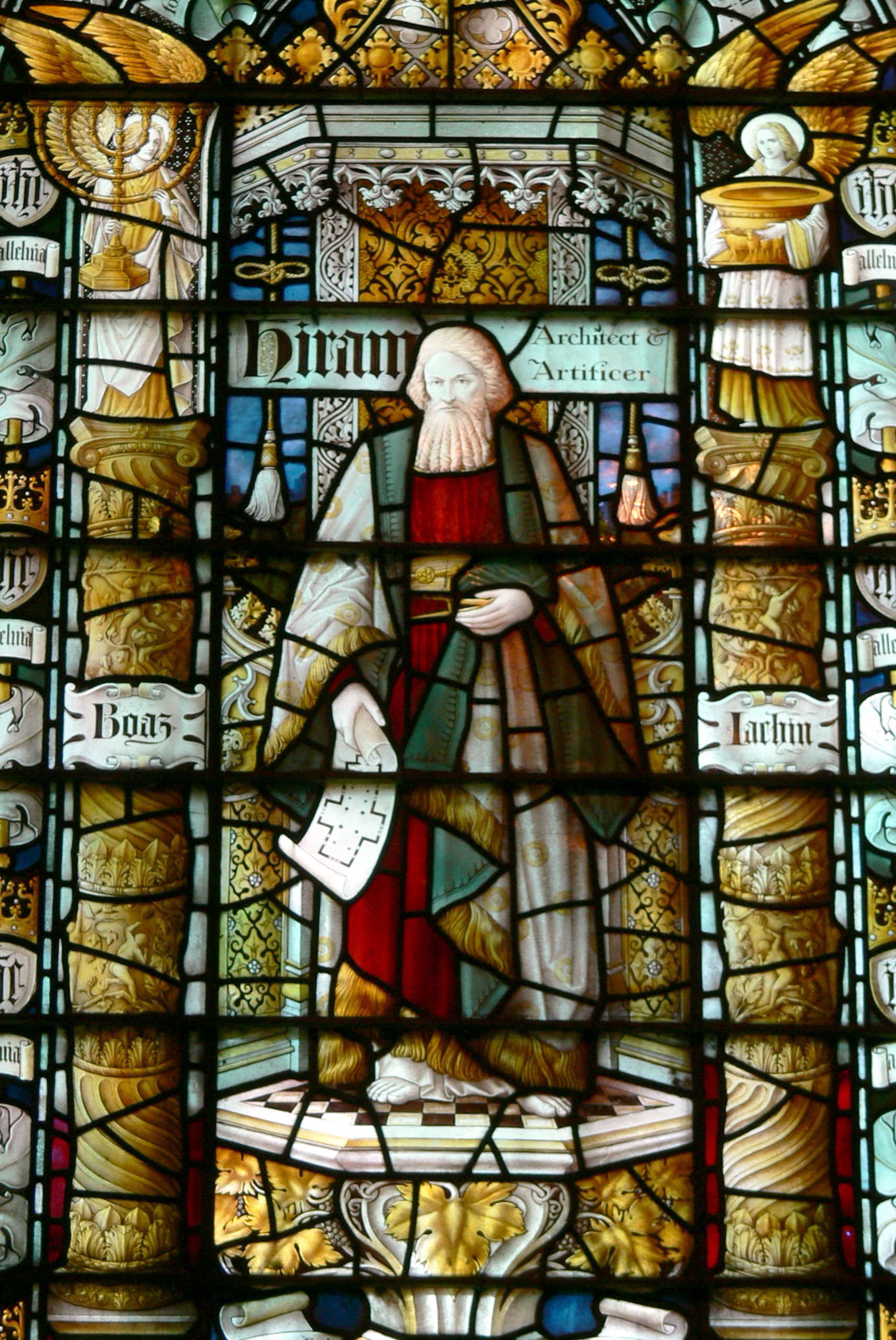
Hiram depicted between the temple's two columns.

A fundamental myth of Freemasonry and the guiding thread of the Master's grade, it appeared in the 1730s. The Hiram myth completely transformed early Masonry, which knew only two grades, by adding a new legend that greatly changed the meaning of initiation. Quickly erasing that of Noah, it became universally established in speculative Freemasonry.

The character of Hiram and the myth that would accompany his legend do not appear in the original or first-generation manuscripts, Régius and Cook, of operative masonry in the 14th century. (Note: Dachez (2017), p. 37) The mention of an architect "master of geometry and chief of all masons" does appear in the second-generation manuscripts in Grand Lodge n°. 1, but his identity is not clearly established. Hypotheses have been put forward to explain these variations, ranging from a simple spelling error by the texts' reproducers, to the corruption of a primitive Hiram legend and its reinstatement during the eighteenth century. (Note: Dachez (2017), p. 38)

In 1723, the first version of Anderson's constitutions refers to "a prince of architects" by the name of Hiram Abiff. This appointment was made in conjunction with the appearance of a Master's grade based on the figure of Hiram in the manuscripts of the old charges of the Spencer family, notably between 1725 and 1729. (Note: Dachez (2017), p. 39)

While the legend's sources remain difficult to establish, 21st-century historians generally opt for a composite myth, made up of several stories based on the Bible: a story about Noah's sons who sought to relieve their father in order to learn his secret; a story about Bezalel and the teaching of the art of building, the secrets surrounding it and which he lavished on the two sons of a king; finally, a story about King Solomon and the building of the temple, in which the architect Hiram appears as the son of a Tyrian and a widow from the tribe of Naphtali. (Note: Dachez (2017), p. 46) The first story comes from the Graham manuscript, which was the first text to mention the recovery of a body and a secret lost through the death of the holder; the second recounts the marvellous talents and qualities of Bezalel and his secrets of the art, which were to be "kept in the heart"; and finally, the third evokes Hiram as the wisest overseer and transmitter of the signs giving rights to masons. The superimposition of these three myths almost gives the full account of the Hiram legend given in Samuel Prichard's 1730 book La Maçonnerie disseéquée. (Note: Dachez (2017), p. 47)

The myth and the legend of Hiram that derive from it differ greatly from other Masonic myths or legends of the builder's trade, which evolve over time and are adapted as times and transmissions change. It appears to be a deliberate construction designed to structure another grade and encourage a more aristocratic type of Masonry, but also to develop a new and different vision of Freemasonry. The Hiram myth revealed a work of scholarship in its constitution that was also, in its time and according to historian Roger Dachez, a political instrument of the young and premier Grand Lodge of England. It brought to the rituals the same innovations and literary qualities as Anderson's constitutions when they were first published for the birth of obediential Freemasonry, both creations stemming from the same movement.

=== The myth of chivalry ===
Although the chivalric myth developed mainly in France, it made its first appearance in the first constitutions in 1723: in a short passage, Anderson established a link between chivalry and Freemasonry.

Following a process of integration that historians trace back the development of the old chivalry to the speech given by the Scottish chevalier Andrew Michael Ramsay in 1736, the ancient chivalry became a founding Masonic myth. Sword, cordon and the initiation ceremony are a direct descendant of chivalry, where fraternity of arms reflects fraternity in the lodge. The number of chivalrous ranks multiplied from 1740 onwards. The chivalric myth, through this legendary filiation, anchors the nascent Freemasonry in a form of immemorial legitimacy, (Note: Hivert-Messeca (2017), p. 18) with masonry and chivalry attributed ancient origins. The myth also offers a way forward for Freemasons wishing to combine action and spirituality.

From the second half of the eighteenth century onwards, it took on crucial importance in Freemasonry, particularly in its high ranks. At the height of the Age of Enlightenment, when rationalism was slowly gaining ground, it was seen as a movement to re-sacralize the faith, tinged with various currents of mysticism, Christianity and occultism. The appropriation of chivalric myths was facilitated by original rituals, such as the medieval ritual of initiation, which has been fully adopted by some chivalric Masonic grades. (Note: Bryon-Portet (2017), p. 132) In France, the oldest attested grade to use chivalric myth is that of "Chevalier de l'Orient", dating from 1748. The legendary plot revolves around the rebuilding of the Second Temple, with a terminal vocation in the eighteenth century as part of a Freemason's journey.

This myth also makes the knight mason a worker who claims a filiation with the stonemasons and cathedral builders, proposing that he now works "with a sword in one hand and a trowel in the other", in the image of the 3rd Order of the French Rite. In this dual role, he asserts himself as a fighter concerned with the fate of the world, but also in search of spirituality. (Note: Bryon-Portet (2017), p. 129) He anchors himself in the ideal of a sublimated past and towards a better future, summing up his action in a dialectic between tradition and progress. (Note: Bryon-Portet (2017), p. 130) Nevertheless, his evolution away from the original operative and workers' references is certainly less rewarding. It is closer to a model where the rules and pomp of a religious and military order give additional prestige and grounds for flattery, sometimes vanity, to a few aristocrats and notables who easily gain access to the ranks that symbolize it.

== Original myths ==
=== The Euclid myth ===
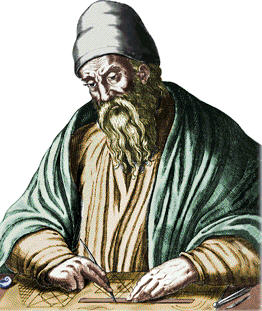
Euclid of Alexandria.

The importance of Euclid in the manuscripts of the Old Charges of English operative masonry is apparent from the very first lines, in the opening formula, "Here begin the statutes of the art of geometry according to Euclid". Through the mythical narrative evoked by the Regius manuscript, Euclid instituted the seven liberal arts, another name for the seven sciences, and the primary reference of the myth. In his writings, Euclid is the most learned of all the crafts, and the one who taught them in Egypt (Note: No historical source confirms his presence at any time in this country Cavaignac (2016), p. 32.) and other countries, where he spread geometry and the various trades. The Cook manuscript takes up the myth, but integrates it into the biblical story that makes Euclid one of Abraham's pupils, and where he is the first to designate geometry under his name. The second-generation manuscripts of the Old Charges from 1583 onwards retain Euclid as the main myth of their moral regulation: in 1710, manuscript Dumfries n°. 4, without much difference to the preceding writings, grants him the additional gift of prophecy, thus taking a further step in the construction of the myth, with the divinatory arts entering into the idea of transcendence, whether religious or not. The myth of Euclid thus serves the praise heaped in these founding texts on geometry, considered a superior science and the principal instrument of economic, artisanal and political management.

The gradual disappearance of references to Euclid began in the last manuscripts of the old charges, which no longer evoked him as the inventor and disseminator of the liberal sciences, while retaining the central function of geometry in the myth of the operatives. The first edition of Anderson's Constitutions in 1723 of so-called speculative Freemasonry, retained the liberal arts, but gave only a more restricted place to Euclid, described as "admirable". It removed him from the fundamental role conferred on him by operative masonry, in favor of the biblical figure of Adam. The Greek geometer and his myth gradually disappeared from the mythology of Freemasonry, as the rationalist spirit, based on reasoning and measurement, seemed to clash with the biblical and religious component that came to the fore in the first constitutions governing the organization of the Premier Grand Lodge of England.

=== The myth of Noah ===
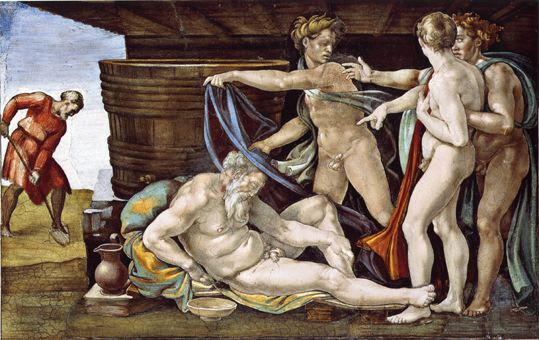
Noah and his sons.

The first-generation manuscripts of the old charges, between 1390 and 1420, mention Noah only briefly, with the evocations focusing more clearly on the great Flood, which serves as a historical time reference for the construction of the myth. The second-generation manuscript Grand Lodge no. 1 (1583) completes the positioning of the Flood to evoke the before and after of the event. Speculative Freemasonry evokes it briefly in the historical section and in the first two chants of Anderson's constitutions, in the first version in 1723. In this evocation, Noah and his three sons are recognized as "authentic Masons", who continue the dissemination and transmission of antediluvian arts and traditions. (Note: Cédot (2017), p. 85)

In 1738, the second edition of the Constitutions gave greater prominence to the figure of Noah, presenting him for the first time as the father of Masonry. Masons are expected to act as "true sons of Noah", who built the ark with the help of his three sons. The myth proposed by the constitutions in this version is that of a world whose origin is Masonic, and whose first Masons are called "Noachides". Chevalier Ramsay, in his speech in 1736, exalts the same myth, describing the patriarch as the order's first Grand Master and inventor of naval architecture. These founding texts of Freemasonry reinforce and attempt to establish Noachism in Masonic legend, which is now based on a universal myth that predates all religious dogma.

In a founding text from 1726, the Graham manuscript, the characters of Noah and his three sons are portrayed in substituted forms, positions and words, clearly foreshadowing the scenes described in the legend of Hiram, which eventually took precedence over the legend of the Master Mason grade. The myth of Noah lives on, however, through adopted masonry, whose ceremonial focus is on access to Noah's ark. The myth can also be found in the 20th degree of the Order of the Royal Secret, under the name of "Grand Patriarch", precursor of the 21st degree of the Ancient and Accepted Scottish Rite, under the name of "Prussian Chevalier or Noachite". (Note: Cédot (2017), p. 95)

=== The myth of Babel ===
The Tower of Babel (Pieter Brueghel the Elder).

The myth of the Tower of Babel has several interpretations in Masonic texts. A moralistic biblical version, an opposing one that proposes a positive vision of the tower's construction, and Anderson's constitutions, which synthesize both. (Note: Cavaignac (2017), p. 53) The Régius manuscript of operative masonry includes the story of the Tower of Babel in its religious prescriptions. The meaning remains close to that of the biblical texts: a manifestation of man's pride in God, which is undone by the confusion of languages. A few centuries later, this more guilt-ridden version is found in the legend of a high grade of the Ancient and Accepted Scottish Rite, the 21st degree. (Note: Cavaignac (2017), p. 55) The myth is also to be found in adopted Masonry, in the form of a fault committed by the "children of the earth". (Note: Cavaignac (2017), p. 56)

Other founding texts, while taking up the myth of the tower, do not retain the fault as the main element, but give a more positive interpretation. This is already the case in the Cooke manuscript (1420), as well as in the old second-generation charges, from 1580 onwards, which exalt the craft and the desire to build, retaining neither pride nor fault in the behavior of men who loyally pass on the rules of the craft to one another. (Note: Cavaignac (2017), p. 57)

Anderson's version of the constitutions is a synthesis of the old charges and the Old Testament version. In the legendary account of the constitutions, the name of the Tower of Babel is not explicitly mentioned, but the myth is clearly evident. While the punishment remains the same, it is merely a consequence of the fact that, in spite of it all, mankind acquired exceptional skills in the art of building, and the fault led to great progress. (Note: Cavaignac (2017), p. 59) In this version, it's an accepted idea, but it doesn't constrain the progress of the human race around Freemasonry, (Note: Cavaignac (2017), p. 60) bringing out the idea that the Babel myth symbolizes excessive disorder, whereas the construction of the temple, which prevails in the Freemasonry legend, represents a symbolic building site of unity and universality. (Note: Cavaignac (2017), p. 61)

=== The myth of Eve ===
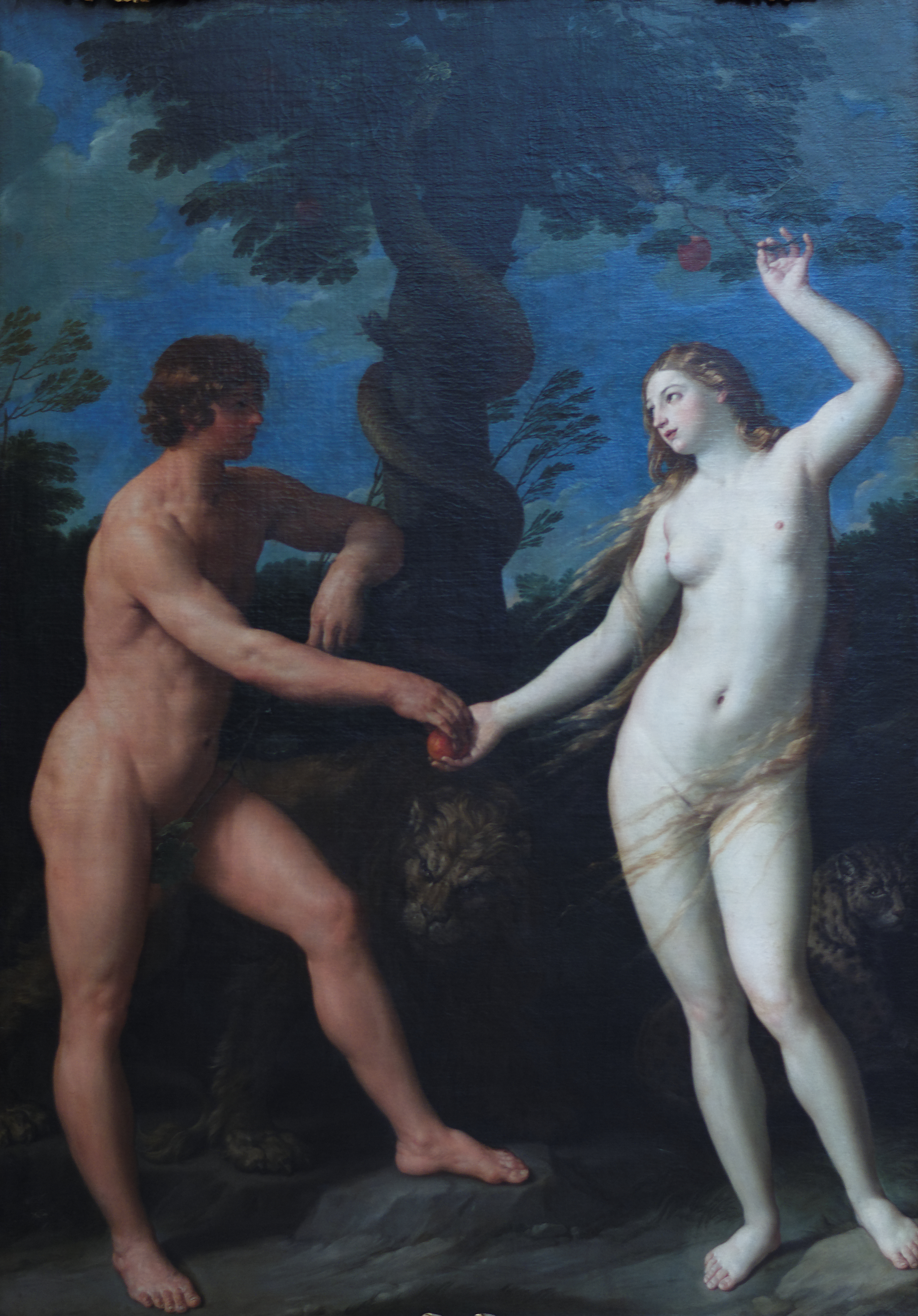
Adam and Eve (Guido Reni)

While Anderson's constitutions, in their 1723 version, trace the first Masonic lodge back to the Earthly Paradise, where Adam and his two sons are present, Eve is not mentioned in this evocation. This exclusion was not effective in Europe throughout the eighteenth century, where many aristocratic women were received as "freemasons", through adopted Masonry, where the rite of adoption incorporated the myth of Eve. (Note: Moreillon (2017), p. 102) Ritualized in various forms, the myth of Eve is most often used for the second grade, and is linked to the apple and the serpent. The first woman appears alongside Adam on tracing boards, where the tree of knowledge appears in the heart of the terrestrial Paradise. In the second grade, recipients are invited to experience the story of Eve in a different symbolic way, by biting into the apple that gives them the knowledge of good and evil. (Note: Moreillon (2017), p. 103) This myth suggests that women of this century should use their reason and will to make choices with knowledge of the first state, and thus be capable of practicing the virtues. What it proposes is, in this symbolism, a gesture that is no longer a fault but a desire for knowledge and the possibility of choice. In this way, the myth of Eve brings women into Freemasonry from its earliest manifestations. (Note: Moreillon (2017), p. 105)

== Romanesque myths ==
=== The operative myth ===
The operative myth has long been alive in the imagination of Freemasonry, making speculative Masons the heirs of the cathedral builders. According to a fairly simple hypothesis, speculative Freemasons, while no longer using the tools of the operative Masons in a practical way, have inherited them and the symbols, rules and secrets that go with them. Historical documentation from the seventeenth century and into the fourteenth and sixteenth centuries provides several records of "freemasons" and "lodges" in England and Scotland on major medieval building sites. The similarity of the semantics employed suggests a continuity. Until the 20th century, this mythical legacy enjoyed a tenacious success, being explained by the theory of transition, which, in the space of a few years, would have transformed disaffected operative lodges into speculative lodges where the construction of cathedrals was replaced by that of intellectual edifices, thanks to the acceptance of gentleman masons as protectors and donors.

However, the proven non-existence of operative lodges, which disappeared as early as the end of the 15th century for political reasons during the Tudor period in England, and the first accepted Freemasons ("gentlemen masons"), who are only attested to at the beginning of the 17th century in Scotland and England, render this transition and the myth of Freemasons as heirs to the builders of cathedrals ineffective. In Scotland, these admissions of non-operational notables, which are rare but clearly documented, are mainly symbolic receptions of notables in operative lodges governed by Schaw statutes, who never or very rarely set foot in their reception lodge again. Without taking part in the work of lodges that generally meet only once a year, no transformation or mutation is possible. The operative myth, with its use of signs, symbols and coded languages provided by the ancient Masonic brotherhoods, was nevertheless used to develop speculative Freemasonry, borrowing some of its codes. The nobility of the architecture and possible philosophical evolutions, supported by the vast and abundant literature of the Renaissance, were to bring together notables and intellectuals who wished, above all, to live in harmony, in an era of religious confrontation.

=== The Templar myth ===
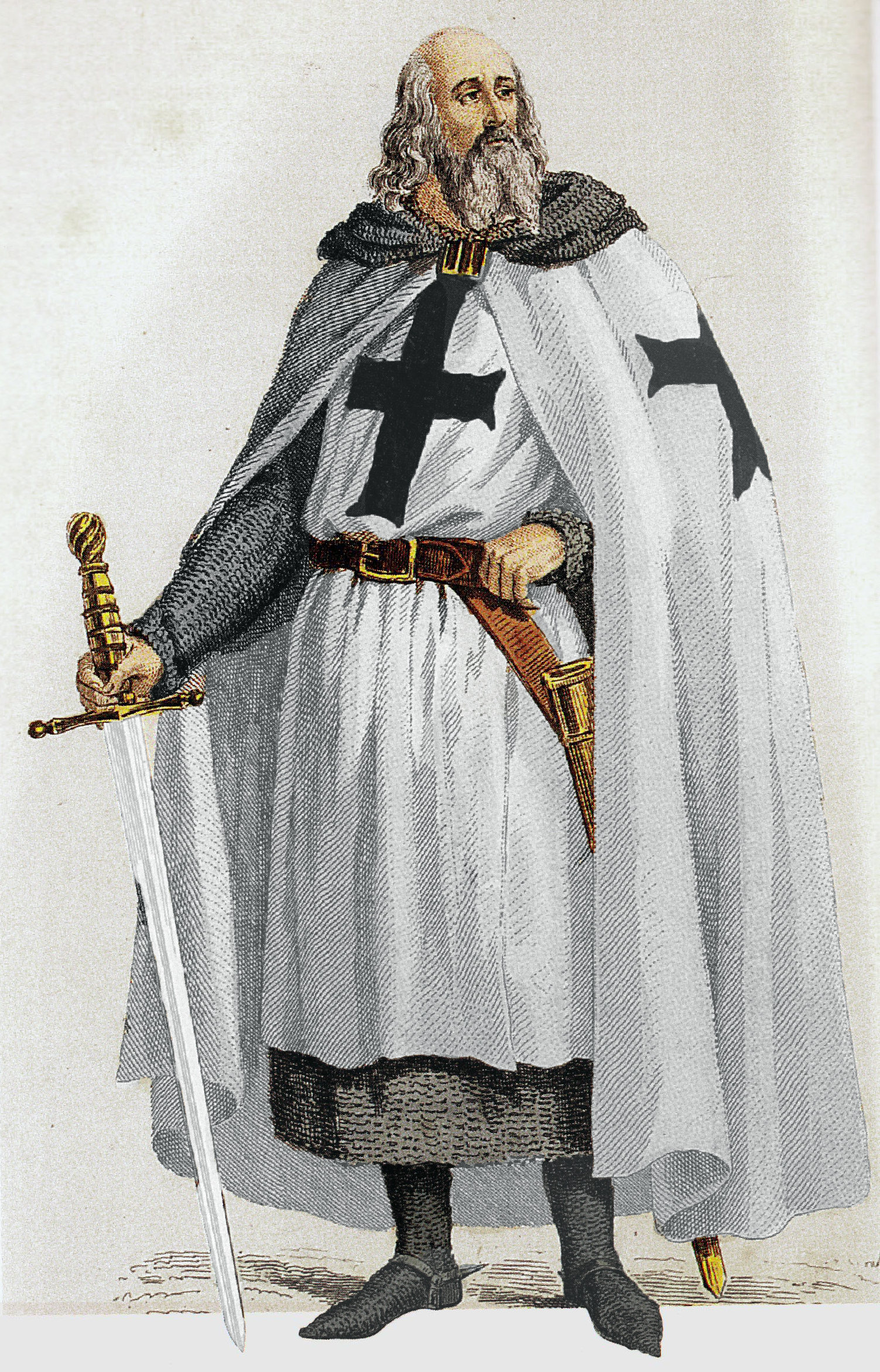
Jacques de Molay.

The myth of the founding Order of the Temple surviving through Freemasonry was to become an autonomous part of the Masonic heritage, late in the middle of the eighteenth century, by which time Freemasonry had established clear practices and structures of its own. The myth of the Templars was first established in response to an aristocratic public which, apart from the chivalric myth of Ramsay's speech, from which the Templars were absent, showed a renewed interest in the history of chivalric orders in general, and the Order of the Temple in particular, on which various authors produced works from the end of the 17th century, such as Pierre Dupuy's Histoire de la condamnation des Templiers, published in 1654 and reprinted several times until 1751.

In the 1740s, a Masonic system was established in Germany, which took the name of Templar Strict Observance and enjoyed considerable success for almost twenty years. This system took the Templar myth to its logical conclusion, teaching and asserting that Freemasonry, under the guise of a peaceful fraternity, was none other than the concealed Order of the Temple, which had survived persecution by taking refuge in the operative lodges of Scotland. This "neo-Templar" system later became one of the founding components of the Rectified Scottish Rite, whose structure is partly based on it. (Note: Mollier (2005), p. 134) The Freemasonry heir to the Templar chevaliers is also rooted in a terminal grade of the Ancient and Accepted Scottish Rite, the Knight Kadosh. In the Francken manuscripts of 1764, the legendary story of the Templars is used extensively in the ritual of the grade. (Note: Mollier (2005), p. 119)

However, 20th- and 21st-century scholars and masonologists have been unanimous in their refutation of the idea of a Templar origin, even a remote one, as this is a matter for the fictional history of Freemasonry, and the claim that this chivalric order survived within Masonry is considered a fabrication. (Note: Mollier (2005), p. 130)

=== The alchemist and Rosicrucian myth ===
Alchemists and Rosicrucians are also part of the romanesque myths of Freemasonry, sometimes cited as hidden founders. The seventeenth century saw the appearance of three manifestos known as the "Order of the Rosicrucian", mainly written by members of the Tübingen Cenacle, all Lutheran theology students. These young idealists imagined and hoped for the advent of a more tolerant, more peaceful world, reconciling faith and emerging science, and expressed this hope in the form of allegorical tales. Kabbalistic doctrines, moral emblems, alchemical and Hermetic symbols were integrated into these manifestos. Later, the existence of a number of symbols in Masonic initiation rituals, such as mercury and sulfur in the chamber of reflection, or the air, water and fire tests of first-degree initiation in certain rituals, enabled comparisons to be made without historicity. These approximations, which appear in the latter half of the 18th century, add a romanesque myth to the story of the creation of Freemasonry, a myth that is not part of its original legends. Rosicrucian mysticism, successful in a period of intellectual effervescence, was nevertheless to influence the young Freemasonry, which borrowed several symbols from its corpus and imbued this new legend with a Masonic grade whose first rituals appeared around 1760, that of Sovereign Rosicrucian Prince or Knight Rosicrucian.

== See also ==
- Myth
- Masonic manuscripts

== Bibliography ==
- Habbas, Christophe (2017). "Ces mythes qui nourrissent la franc-maçonnerie". La Chaîne d'Union (in French) (HS 6). CHU2017.
- Cavaignac, François (August 2016). Les Mythes maçonniques revisités. Univers maçonnique (in French). Éditions Dervy. ISBN 979-10-242-0157-3..
- Dachez, Roger; Bauer, Alain (2016). "Sources légendaires et mythiques". La Franc-maçonnerie. Que sais-je? (in French). PUF. ISBN 978-2-13-075022-2.
- Mollier, Pierre (2005). La Chevalerie maçonnique: Franc-maçonnerie, imaginaire chevaleresque et légende templière au siècle des Lumières. Renaissance traditionnelle (in French). Éditions Dervy. ISBN 978-2-84454-398-1.
- Naudon, Paul (2012). "Les sources spirituelles". La Franc-maçonnerie. Quadrige (in French). Paris: PUF. ISBN 978-2-13-059447-5.
- Vierne, Simone (November 2008). Les Mythes de la franc-maçonnerie. Univers maçonnique (in French). Vega. ISBN 978-2-85829-541-8..
- Solange Sudarkis (2021). Il était une fois un mythe : Hiram. ISBN 978-2-919656-40-0. Wikidata Q106773455.
