= Demosthenes Philalethes =

Ancient Greek physician

Demosthenes Philalethes (Gr. Δημοσθένης ὁ Φιλαλήθης) was an ancient Greek physician of Asia Minor who was one of the pupils of Alexander Philalethes, a contemporary of Aristoxenus, and a follower of the teachings of Herophilos. He succeeded Alexander as the head of the Herophilean school of medicine in Carura. He probably lived around the beginning of the 1st century, and was especially celebrated for his skill as an oculist. He was the author of the most influential ophthalmological work of antiquity, the Ophthalmicus, on diseases of the eye, which appears to have been still extant in the Middle Ages, but of which nothing now remains, although some extracts are preserved by Aëtius Amidenus, Paul of Aegina, Rufus of Ephesus, and other later writers. In this book, he attributed glaucoma to a pathology of the crystalline humor. He also wrote a work on the pulse, which is quoted by Galen. Demosthenes was the last known Herophilean in Asia Minor.
