= Jackie Pigeaud =

Jackie Pigeaud (1937, Saint-Hilaire-des-Loges – 13 November 2016) was a French professor of Latin and historian of medicine. He occupied a chair at the University of Nantes and was a member of the Institut Universitaire de France.

His field of research was the relationship of body and soul in the tradition of medical thought. He died in Orvault in 2016.

== Works ==
- (Ed.), Théroigne de Méricourt, La Lettre-mélancolie, Lettre adressée en 1801 à Danton (mort en... 1794), transcripte par Jean-Pierre Ghersenzon, Verdier / L’Éther Vague, 2005.
- La maladie de l’âme. Etude sur la relation de l'âme et du corps dans la tradition médico-philosophique antique (thèse de doctorat, published 1981), repr. with a new preface 2006, Les Belles Lettres, 590pp. ISBN 2-251-32842-4.
- L’Art et le Vivant, Gallimard, 1995. ISBN 2-07-073135-9.
- Poétiques du corps. Aux origines de la médecine, Les Belles Lettres, L’Age d’or, 2008, 706pp. ISBN 2-251-42032-0
- Melancholia: Le malaise de l'individu, Payot, Manuels Payot, 2008, 272pp. ISBN 2-228-90176-8.

== Related publications ==
- Une traversée des savoirs. Mélanges offerts à Jackie Pigeaud par Jean Dhombres, Yves Hersant, Philippe Heuzé, Philippe Mudry, Éric Van der Schueren, Les collections de la République des Lettres, LES PRESSES DE L'UNIVERSITÉ LAVAL LES ÉDITIONS DE L'IQRC: Québec 2008 (Festschrift)
- Roger-Pol Droit, Jackie Pigeaud : « L'Antiquité, j'y habite … », Le Monde des livres, venrdedi 26 septembre 2008, p. 10
