= Carura =

Human settlement in Turkey

Coordinates: 37°56′25″N 28°49′23″E

Carura or Karoura (Ancient Greek: Κάρουρα) was an ancient town of Asia Minor on the north-eastern border of ancient Caria.

Its position east of the range of Cadmus assigns it to Phrygia, under which country Strabo describes it. It was on the south side of the Maeander River, 20 miles west of Laodicea to Ephesus. The place is identified by hot springs approximately 12 miles northwest of Denizli, that have been described by the scholars Pococke and Chandler. Strabo observed that Carura contained many inns (πανδοχεῖα), which is explained by the fact of its being on a line of great traffic, by which the wool and other products of the interior were transported to the coast. He added that it has hot springs, some in the Maeander, and some on the banks of the river.

This tract of land is subject to earthquakes. In a story reported by Strabo, a brothel keeper was lodging in the inns with a great number of his women, they were all swallowed up one night by the earth opening. Henry William Chandler observed on the spot a jet of hot water, which sprung up several inches from the ground; and also the remains of an ancient bridge over the river. On the road between Carura and Laodicea was the temple of Men Carus, a Carian deity; and in the time of Strabo there was a noted Herophilean school of medicine here, under the presidency of Zeuxis, and then Alexander Philalethes. Chandler discovered some remains on the road to Laodicea, which, he supposes, may be the traces of this temple; but he states nothing that confirms this conjecture.

Herodotus mentions a place called "Cydrara", to which Xerxes came on his road from Colossae to Sardes. It was the border between Lydia and Phrygia, and the Lydian king Croesus fixed a stele there with an inscription on it, which declared the boundary. Classical scholar William Martin Leake thought that the Cydrara of Herodotus may be Carura. It could not be far off; but the boundary between Lydia and Phrygia should perhaps not be located south of the Maeander in this region.

Modern scholars locate Carura near Tekke, in Asiatic Turkey.
