= Coins of the Republic of Ireland =

Since independence, there have been three sets of coins in Ireland. In all three, the coin showed a Celtic harp on the obverse. The pre-decimal coins of the Irish pound had realistic animals on the reverse; the decimal coins retained some of these but featured ornamental birds on the lower denominations; and the euro coins used the common design of the euro currencies. The pre-decimal and original decimal coins were of the same dimensions as the same denomination British coins, as the Irish pound was in a de-facto currency union with the British pound sterling. British coins were widely accepted in Ireland, and conversely, to a lesser extent. In 1979, Ireland joined the Exchange Rate Mechanism and the Irish pound left parity with sterling; coin designs introduced after this differed between the two countries.

== Background ==
The first coins minted in Ireland were produced in about 995 AD in Dublin for King Sitric, the Hiberno-Norse King of Dublin. These penny coins bore the head and name of the king and the word Dyflin for Dublin. John of England was among the first Anglo-Norman monarchs to mint coins in Ireland; these were farthings, halfpennies and pennies. It was not until the reign of Henry VIII that Irish coins bore the harp and, later in Henry's reign, the year. In the following centuries gold, silver and copper coins were issued, and at one time, metal from melted-down gun barrels was used; this was called "gun money". Coins issued in the 18th and 19th centuries often included the word Hibernia on the harp side. The last Irish coins issued prior to independence were during the reign of King George IV, in 1822 and 1823. Irish coins were withdrawn in 1826 following the full political union of Ireland and Britain in the 1800 Act of Union. Occasional fantasy coins were minted in the next century but these were neither circulated nor legal tender.

The Irish Free State decided soon after its foundation in the 1920s to design its own coins and banknotes. It was decided that the Irish currency would be pegged to the pound sterling. The Coinage Act, 1926 was passed as a legislative basis for the minting of coins for the state and these new coins commenced circulation on 12 December 1928.

As is common with numismatic terminology the side of the seal of the state is termed the "obverse"; this is often called the common side; the "reverse" is the side with the denomination specific design.

Coins are issued by the Central Bank of Ireland which acts as an agent of the Minister for Finance.

== The Irish Pound ==
=== Pre-decimal coins ===
Shilling coins featured a bull design. They continued to be used after decimalisation as five pence until the early 1990s when the 5p coin was reduced in size.

In 1926, the Irish government created a committee chaired by Senator William Butler Yeats to determine designs suitable for the coins. The other members of the committee were Thomas Bodkin, Dermot O'Brien, Lucius O'Callaghan and Barry Egan.

Some decisions were made at the outset. The harp was to be on most if not all coins, and all lettering would be in Irish. The committee decided that people associated with "the present time" should not feature in any designs, no doubt due to the political divisions which had led to the Irish Civil War. They decided later that religious or cultural themes should be avoided in case coins became relics or medals. Agriculture was essential to the economy of Ireland and this theme was chosen for the coins, which used designs featuring animals and birds.

Finally, the harp and the words Saorstát Éireann ("Irish Free State") were chosen for the obverse side of coins. Images of animals and birds were presented to the chosen artists to design the reverse and they were also given pictures of the Dalway harp and Trinity College harp for guidance. Later, the Minister for Finance, Ernest Blythe decided that the value of the coins should be written in numerals as well as in words, and he suggested using plants; this latter suggestion was rejected because the competition was at an advanced stage and due to the difficulty of obtaining good facsimiles of plants.

Three Irish artists Jerome Connor, Albert Power and Oliver Sheppard were chosen, and also the foreign artists Paul Manship (American), Percy Metcalfe (English) Carl Milles (Swedish) and Publio Morbiducci (Italian); a number of other artists were invited but did not take part. Each artist was paid and allowed to produce designs in plaster or metal, with a prize for the winner. Identifying marks were removed from the designs so the committee did not know whose designs were being judged. Percy Metcalfe's designs were chosen and design modifications were added with assistance from civil servants at the Department of Agriculture.

The first coins were struck in 1928 and were minted at the Royal Mint in London. In 1938, following the introduction of the Constitution of Ireland, the obverse of the coins was modified with the Irish language name of the State, "Éire", and the harp was also modified so that it wore better. The Central Bank Act, 1942 Section 58 allowed pure nickel to be substituted with a cupro-nickel alloy. The description of the state as the "Republic of Ireland" did not require any change in the name on coins issued after 1948. The Coinage Act, 1950 changed the law on coinage principally with the removal of silver from coins then in existence. The final piece of primary legislation for predecimal coins was the Coinage (Amendment) Act, 1966 which allowed for a ten shillings coin to be minted and circulated. The ten shillings was the only modern circulating Irish coin not to feature the harp, to incorporate edge lettering, and to depict an actual Irishman (Pádraig Pearse), and to depict a political subject (Pearse was an Irish revolutionary and the edge lettering in Irish Gaelic only referred to the 1916 Easter Rising).

While many of the Irish coins are common, particularly in lower grades, there are some notable rarities. Most of the 1943 Florins and Half Crowns were melted down at the Royal Mint, and only small numbers were released.

Only one and two specimens, respectively, are known of the 1938 Half Crown and Penny. These are classed as pattern coins, as no coins dated 1938 were struck for circulation.

Summary: Pre-decimal coins
English name	Irish name	Numeral (Note: Irish coins used d as the abbreviation for pence, from the Latin denarius. This is in contrast to contemporary stamps, which used the abbreviation p from the Irish pingin.)	Reverse	Introduction	Withdrawal	£1 fraction	Pence value
Farthing	Feoirling	1/4d	Woodcock	12 December 1928	1 January 1962	1/960	1/4
Halfpenny	Leathphingin	1/2d	Sow and farrow	12 December 1928	1 August 1969	1/480	1/2
Penny	Pingin	1d	Hen and chickens	12 December 1928	1 January 1972	1/240	1
Threepence	Leath reul (Note: The word reul (alternatively written réal) comes from the Spanish real, which in earlier centuries circulated widely in Ireland with a value of sixpence.)	3d	Irish hare	12 December 1928	1 January 1972	1/80	3
Sixpence	Reul	6d	Wolfhound	12 December 1928	1 January 1972	1/40	6
Shilling	Scilling	1s	Bull	12 December 1928	1 January 1993	1/20	12
Florin	Flóirín	2s	Salmon	12 December 1928	1 June 1994	1/10	24
Half crown	Leath choróin	2 1/2s	Horse	12 December 1928	1 January 1970	1/8	30
Ten shillings	Deich scilling	10s	Death of Cú Chulainn	12 April 1966	10 February 2002	1/2	120

=== Decimal coins ===
The ten pence piece featured a salmon, as the florin had previously. The redesigned smaller 10p of the 1990s is shown on the right.

Three new designs were created in bronze for the new decimal currency by the artist Gabriel Hayes, and were based upon manuscript designs of ornamental birds in Celtic knotwork style. The designs of Percy Metcalfe were retained for the new five and ten pence coins, taken from the shilling and florin, respectively. The new fifty pence piece bore the image of the woodcock from the old farthing. The designs were quite simple using only figures and symbols to indicate the value; using only the letter "P" to denote both penny and pingin (the Irish word for penny).

In 1978, the Central Bank of Ireland opened the Currency Centre at Sandyford in Dublin for the production of coins and banknotes. Irish coins had previously been produced in Great Britain at the Royal Mint.

The rising expense of minting coins necessitated the introduction of the twenty pence coin in 1986; the halfpenny coin was withdrawn at this time as inflation had reduced its buying power. The introduction of the Irish pound coin required the Decimal Currency Act, 1990. These ECU coins were issued in 50 ECU, 10 ECU and 5 ECU denominations, in gold, silver and silver respectively. These coins used the Irish red deer design from the Irish pound coin with a mountain relief in the background and other notable differences such as the 12 stars of the European Flag surrounding the harp, quite similar to the Irish euro coins.

The coins issued under the Decimal Currency Acts were finally withdrawn from circulation in 2002 by the Irish Pound Coinage (Calling In) (No. 2) Order, 2001 which revoked an earlier similar order; the date was set for 10 February 2002.

Summary: Decimal coins
English name	Irish name	Value in euro	Numeral	Diameter	Thickness	Reverse	Introduction	Withdrawal	£1 fraction
Halfpenny	Leathphingin	€0.0063	1/2p	17.14 mm	1 mm	Ornamental bird	15 February 1971	1 January 1985	1/200
Penny	Pingin	€0.0127	1p	20.32 mm	1.65 mm (1.52 mm before 1990)	Ornamental bird	15 February 1971	10 February 2002	1/100
Two pence	Dhá phingin	€0.0254	2p	25.91 mm	2.03 mm (1.85mm before 1990)	Ornamental bird	15 February 1971	10 February 2002	1/50
Five pence	Cúig phingin	€0.0635	5p	18.5 mm (23.59mm before 1993)		Bull	8 September 1969	10 February 2002	1/20
Ten pence	Deich bpingin	€0.127	10p	22.0 mm (28.5mm before 1993)		Salmon	8 September 1969	10 February 2002	1/10
Twenty pence	Fiche pingin	€0.2539	20p	27.1 mm		Irish Hunter	30 October 1986	10 February 2002	1/5
Fifty pence	Caoga pingin	€0.6349	50p	30.0 mm	3.15 mm	Woodcock	17 February 1970	10 February 2002	1/2
One Pound	Punt	€1.2697	£1	31.11 mm	1.90 mm	Red deer stag	20 June 1990	10 February 2002	1

== The euro ==
The introduction of the euro was overseen by the Euro Changeover Board of Ireland which was a special agency created on May 5, 1998 by the Minister for Finance; this agency provided a wide variety of information including converters, training packs, images and public advertisements on a wide range of media to ensure a successful transfer. As with all eurozone countries, Ireland continued to mint its own coins after the currency changeover to the euro. One side of euro coins is common across the eurozone, it is the obverse which has a design unique to Ireland. Although some other countries used more than one design, or even a separate design for each of the eight coins (1c, 2c, 5c, 10c, 20c, 50c, €1 and €2), Ireland used only one design. A redesigned harp (superficially identical to that used on earlier coins) was used, having been designed by Jarlath Hayes. Some other eurozone members have unique lettering around the €2 coin. The edge on Irish €2 coins merely has the sequence " ", repeated three times.

The first collectors' commemorative coin issued since the changeover was a €10 silver coin to mark the Special Olympics in 2003. This was struck in sterling .925 silver and hand finished to create a distinctive gold logo and harp. A €5 coin was also produced. Since then a number of commemorative coins have been issued including one for the accession of the ten new European Union member states on 1 May 2004. One side of the €10 coin depicts a swan sitting on ten eggs, with the reverse depicting the harp and the names of all ten members in their native language. The first gold coin ever issued by the Central Bank was a €20 issued in 2006 to celebrate the 100th anniversary of the birth of Samuel Beckett. These commemorative coins are only legal tender in Ireland, and are not valid elsewhere in the eurozone.

In 2007, Ireland issued a €2 common coin for general circulation, together with the others countries of the Eurozone, commemorating the fiftieth anniversary of the Treaty of Rome followed by a €2 common commemorative coin in 2009 celebrating the tenth anniversary of the birth of the euro currency in 1999, by another €2 common commemorative coin in 2012 for the tenth anniversary of the introduction of coins and banknotes denominated in euro and, finally, by another €2 common commemorative dedicated to the thirtieth anniversary of the European Flag in 2015. For the first time since it adopted the euro, Ireland issued, on its own, in 2016, a €2 commemorative coin in honour of the hundredth anniversary of the Easter Rising in 1916.

In 2013, the Central Bank of Ireland issued a silver €10 commemorative coin in honour of James Joyce that misquoted a famous line from his masterwork Ulysses despite being warned on at least two occasions by the Department of Finance over difficulties with copyright and design.

All pre-euro Irish coins may be exchanged for their equivalent in euros any weekday morning at the Central Bank in Dublin.

== See also ==
- Banknotes of the Republic of Ireland
- Coins of Ireland
- Arms of Ireland
- Commemorative coins of Ireland
- Euro gold and silver commemorative coins (Ireland)

== Bibliography ==
- "Coinage of Saorstát Éireann", William Butler Yeats, The Stationery Office, Dublin, 1928.
- "The Irish Coinage Designs", Thomas Bodkin DLitt, Metropolitan School of Art, Dublin, November 30, 1928.
