= Symbols of Ireland =

The island of Ireland, with border between Republic of Ireland and Northern Ireland indicated.

Symbols of Ireland are marks, images, or objects that represent Ireland. Because Ireland was not partitioned until 1922, many of the symbols of Ireland predate the division into Southern Ireland (later Irish Free State and then Ireland) and Northern Ireland.

Unlike other countries (such as the United States, with the state symbols), Irish and Northern Irish state symbols are rarely defined by official Acts; they are defined by common usage or by various interest groups.

These symbols are seen in official capacities, such as flags, coats of arms, postage stamps, and currency, and in URLs.

They appear less formally as recurring themes in literature, art and folk art, heraldry, monuments, clothing, personal decoration, and as the names of parks, bridges and streets.

== Insignia ==
=== Coats of arms ===
The coat of arms of Ireland

The coat of arms of the Executive Committee of the Privy Council of Northern Ireland, the now-abolished Government of Northern Ireland

The arms of Ireland are a gold, silver-stringed Celtic harp (cláirseach) on an azure field.

As a region, Northern Ireland has not been granted a coat of arms, but the Government of Northern Ireland was granted arms in 1924, which have not been in use since the suspension of the Parliament of Northern Ireland in 1972, which was abolished the following year. Its notable features included the Irish elk and the banner of the House of de Burgh.

=== Flags ===
The flag of the Republic of Ireland

Previous flag of Northern Ireland (1953–1972)

St Patrick's Saltire

The flag of Ireland is a tricolour of green, white and orange, first flown in 1848. The green stands for Irish Catholicism, the orange for Irish Protestantism, and white for peace between the two.

Although it was originally intended as a symbol of peace and ecumenism, the tricolour is today seen by some Irish unionists as a symbol of Irish republicanism and the Irish Republican Army. Many other flags are suggested as the cross-border flag for Ireland.

The flag of Northern Ireland (Ulster Banner) was used officially between 1953 and 1973. The Union Jack is also used prominently in Northern Ireland and has been the flag of the United Kingdom since 1801. It is derived by combining Saint George's Cross (for England), St Andrew's Saltire (for Scotland) and Saint Patrick's Saltire.

St Patrick's saltire has rarely been used as a symbol of Ireland since Ireland's independence from the United Kingdom. In present day, it is used mostly by institutions in Ireland which were established before independence and which retain historic links to the United Kingdom, for example Trinity College Dublin and the Royal College of Surgeons in Ireland. It has been suggested that the Saltire should be used as Northern Ireland's official flag.

=== Motto ===
Great Seal of the Irish Catholic Confederation, 1642–52

The Republic of Ireland has no national motto, but Erin go Bragh (Ireland Forever) is a popular unofficial motto. Northern Ireland has used the motto Quis separabit?, Latin from Romans 8:35: Quis nos separabit a caritate Christi..., "Who shall separate us from the love of Christ?"

The motto Hiberni Unanimes pro Deo Rege et Patria ("The Irish United for God, King, and Country") was used by Confederate Ireland.

The Society of United Irishmen (1780s–1798) used Equality: it is new strung and shall be heard as a motto.

== Flora and fauna ==
The coins introduced in 1928 by the Irish Free State depicted a mixture of farm and game animals, the more "noble" species on higher denominations: woodcock (farthing); sow and farrow (halfpenny); hen and chicks (penny); Irish hare (threepence); Irish Wolfhound (sixpence); bull (shilling); Atlantic salmon (florin) Irish Sport Horse (half crown). The pound coin introduced in 1990 featured a red deer stag.

=== Bird ===
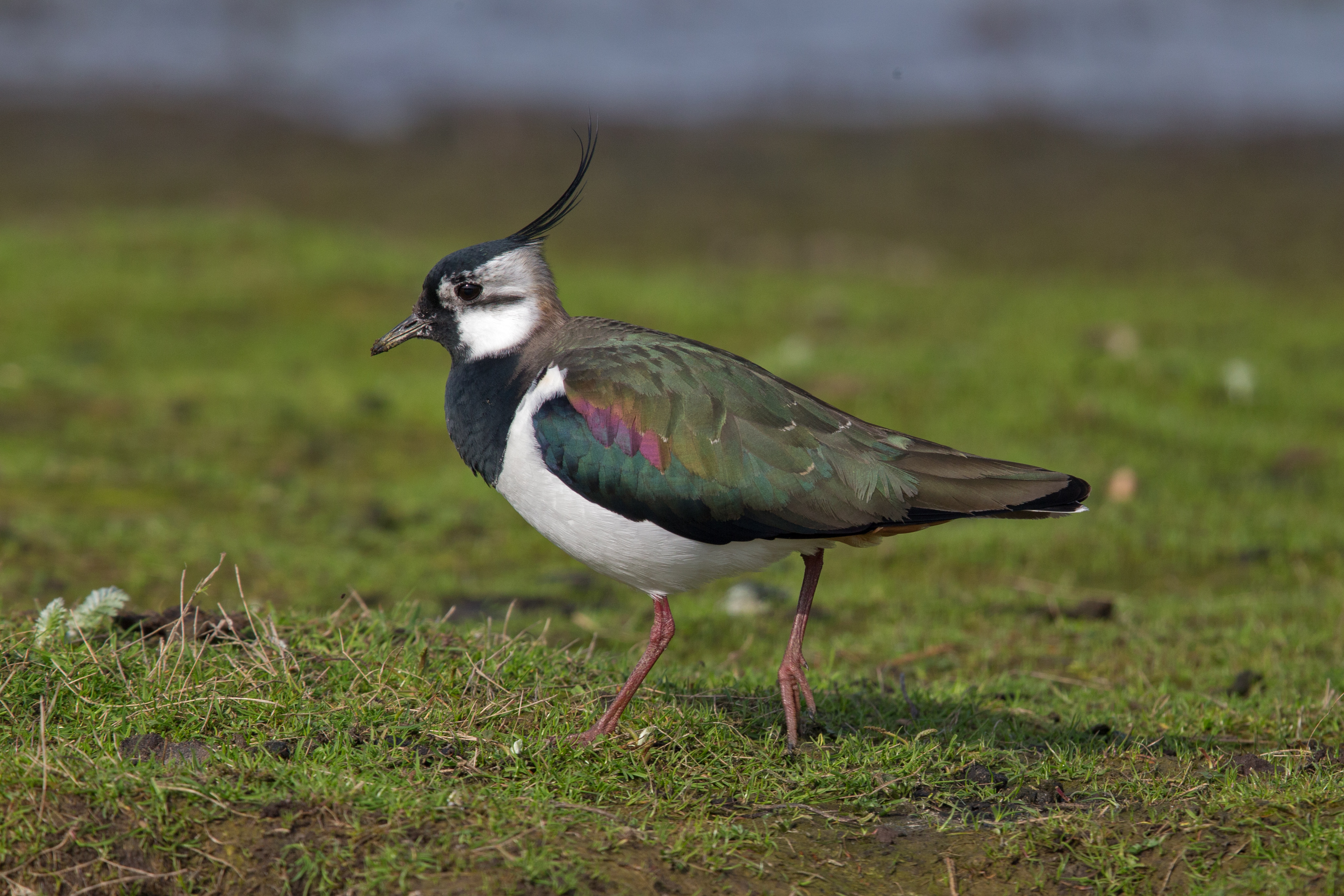
Northern lapwing

The northern lapwing (Vanellus vanellus) was declared the Republic of Ireland's national bird by a committee of the Irish Wildlife Conservancy in 1990.

Northern Ireland does not have an official national bird, but the Eurasian oystercatcher (Haematopus ostralegus) was unofficially selected in 1961.

The Irish Examiner has put the rook (Corvus frugilegus) forward as a possible national bird, due to their "wild hardiness, spirit, and resilience, in the face of all difficulties, and their ability to cope with style and a bit of craic, with anything that the world throws at them."

In 2016 Niall Hatch of BirdWatch Ireland listed ten possible national birds: European robin, peregrine falcon, common house martin, Eurasian curlew, roseate tern, barn owl, common swift, Bohemian waxwing, Eurasian blackcap, northern pintail.

In 2019, the European golden plover (Pluvialis apricaria) and roseate tern (Sterna dougallii) appeared on a series of two "National Bird" stamps issued by An Post.

=== Bull ===
Cattle have been important in Irish mythology and folklore for centuries, due to their economic importance as sources of milk, cheese, leather, and beef, as well as a source of social status. The bull has long been associated with high status in Ireland, appearing as an important animal in Irish several myths, such as the epic Táin Bó Cúailnge (The Cattle Raid of Cooley), Táin Bó Flidhais, and the tale of Glas Gaibhnenn. The prominence of the bull in Irish mythology reflects a prehistory of cattle raising and cattle raiding in which the bull was seen as an important symbol of power among kings.

St Luke's winged bull is illustrated in Celtic style in the Book of Kells, as well as on various Irish stamps.

=== Dog breed ===
The Irish Wolfhound is generally considered Ireland's national breed, although some, including Michael Collins, have put forward the Kerry Blue Terrier as an alternative.

=== Fish ===
The northern pike (Esox lucius) is Northern Ireland's national fish.

"Coarse fish" have been described as the Republic of Ireland's national fish; this category includes the likes of bream, perch and carp.

=== Sheep ===
Sheep-raising and wool products are historically important in Ireland, and sheep feature commonly in souvenirs sold to tourists.

=== Wild mammal ===
The national land mammal is unclear. The Irish hare (Lepus timidus hibernicus) has been described as a national animal, as has the red deer (Cervus elaphus). Although extinct, the Irish elk (giant deer, Megaloceros giganteus) is also associated with Ireland, because it was first discovered there; in reality, it was not unique to Ireland, living across Eurasia, and was not a true elk either.

=== Plant ===
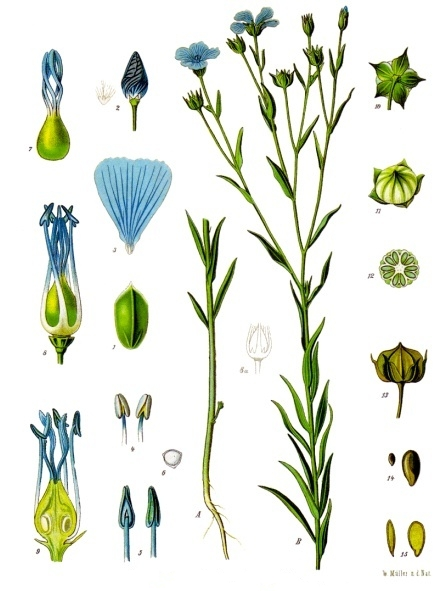
Flax

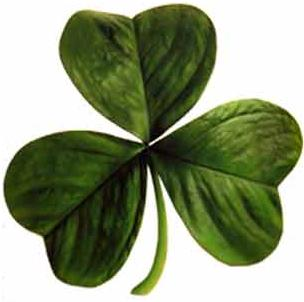
Shamrock

The national plant is the shamrock (Trifolium dubium or Trifolium repens).

Fuchsia magellanica 'Riccartonii' (hummingbird fuchsia, hardy fuchsia; in Irish deora Dé, "tears of God") has sometimes been described as the national flower, despite not being a native plant.

The Easter lily is an important symbol of commemoration to Irish people.

Flax (Linum usitatissimum) is widely used as a symbol of Northern Ireland. It is the emblem of the Northern Ireland Assembly, referencing Ulster's linen industry.

=== Tree ===
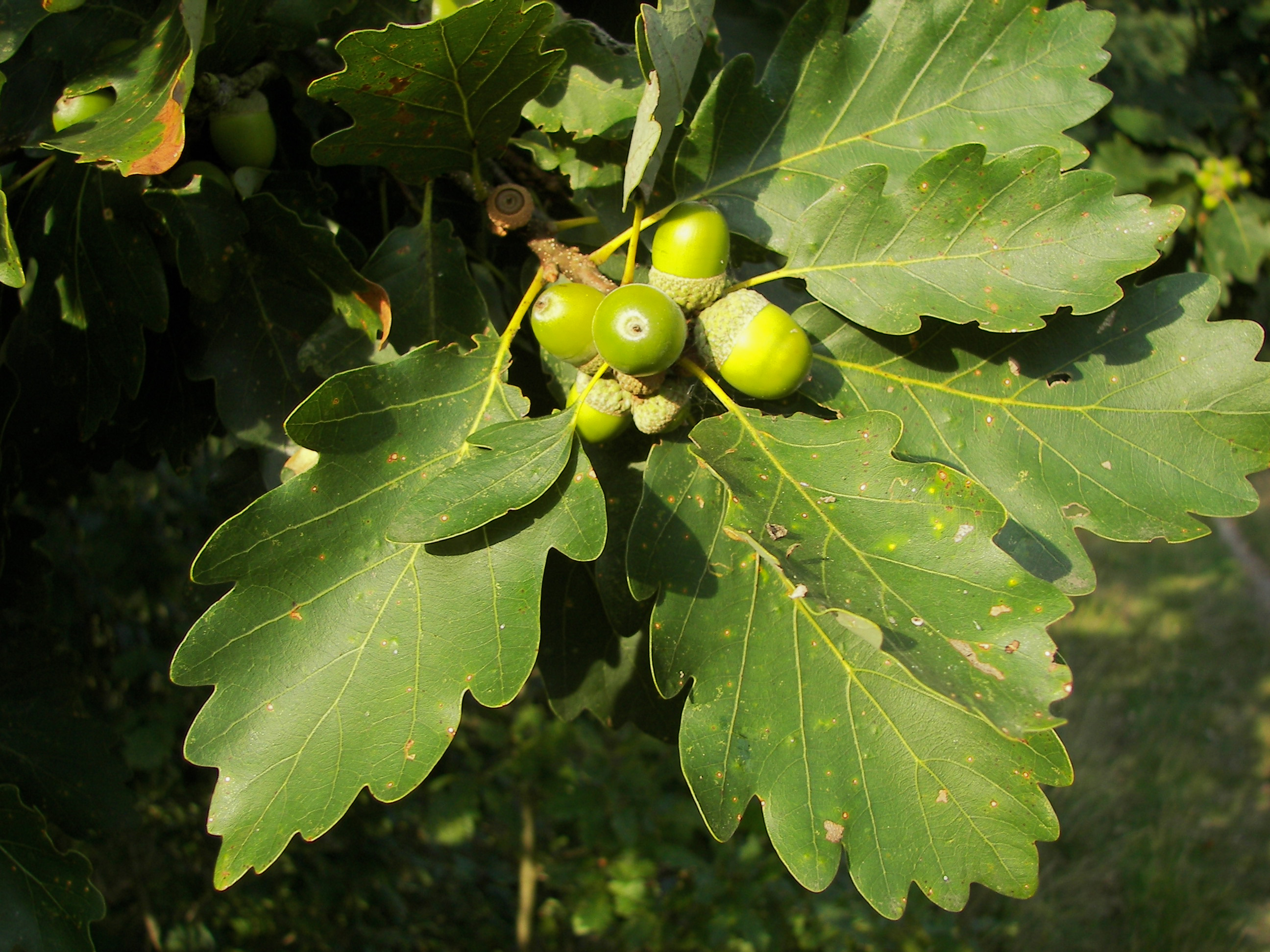
Leaves and acorns of the sessile oak

The national tree of the Republic is the sessile oak (Quercus petraea), declared as such in 1990 by Taoiseach Charlie Haughey.

Other accounts give the strawberry tree (Arbutus unedo) as the national tree.

== Culture ==
=== Dance ===
Irish dance is Ireland's national dance.

=== Instrument ===
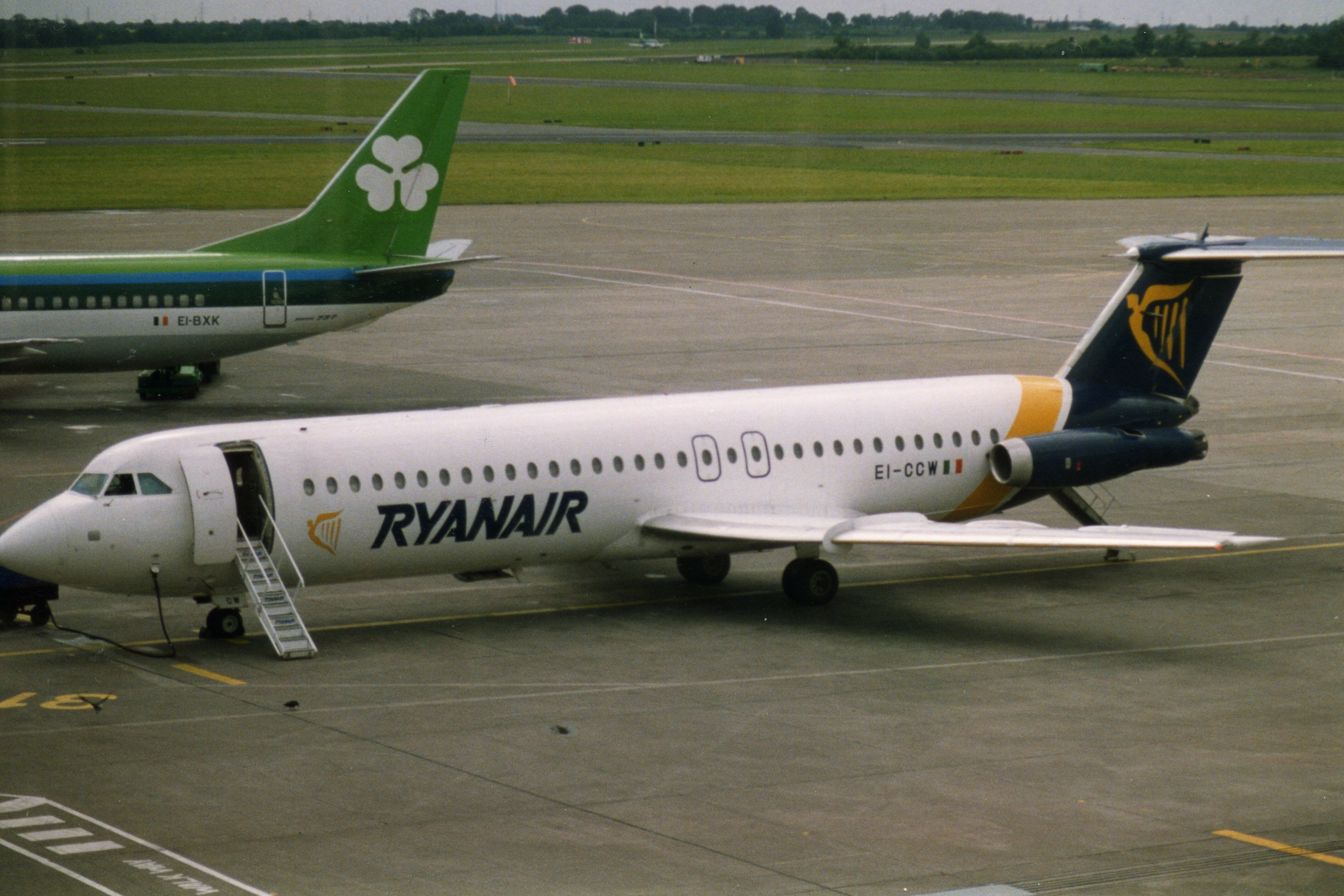
An Aer Lingus Boeing 737 and a Ryanair BAC 1-11 at Dublin Airport, whose liveries sport the Irish shamrock and the Celtic harp, respectively.

The Celtic harp (cláirseach), great Irish warpipes (píob mhór), uilleann pipes and the bodhrán have all been described as national musical instruments. A gold Celtic harp on a green field has historically been used in heraldry to represent Ireland.

The Lambeg drum which often used in parades of the Orange Order and the Ancient Order of Hibernians, is referral as the unofficial national instrument of Northern Ireland. Also, the flute which is often linked to the parades, is an associated national instrument.

=== National anthem ===
"Amhrán na bhFiann" ("The Soldiers' Song") is the national anthem of the Republic of Ireland. Written in English by Peadar Kearney and set to music by Patrick Heeney in 1907, it was translated to Irish by Liam Ó Rinn in 1923; the Irish-language version is considered the official anthem. "God Save Ireland" was used from the 1870s until independence.

"Ireland's Call" has been used by the Ireland national rugby union team and others since 1995.

"God Save the King" (alternatively "God Save the Queen", depending on the gender of the reigning monarch) is used by Northern Ireland as it is a part of the UK, although its use is controversial amongst Irish nationalists. The Irish folk song "Londonderry Air", sometimes with the lyrics of "Danny Boy" is often used a substitute national anthem for Northern Ireland.

=== Personifications ===
There are several national personifications, all female:

- Hibernia, an attractive, vulnerable girl
- Kathleen Ní Houlihan
- The Sean-Bhean bhocht: a poor old woman who needs the help of young Irish men willing to fight and die to free Ireland
- Banba, Fódla and Ériu, three goddesses
- Róisín Dubh (Dark Little Rose)

=== Poet ===
Grave of James Clarence Mangan with inscription calling him "Ireland's National Poet", with a quotation from his Dark Rosaleen.

Thomas Moore (1779–1852) and W. B. Yeats (1865–1939) are both considered the national poet of Ireland.

Seamus Heaney (1939–2013) has also been described as a national poet of Ireland, or Northern Ireland.

John Banim (1798–1842), James Clarence Mangan (1803–1849) and Samuel Ferguson (1810–1886) were also advanced as a candidates for national poet in the 19th century.

Jane Wilde ("Speranza") was known in her lifetime as "National Poetess of Ireland"; among recent women poets, Eavan Boland (1944–2020) has also been named as a national poet by, for example, Paula Meehan.

== Other ==
=== Drink ===
Irish breakfast tea is described as the national (non-alcoholic) drink.

Among alcoholic drinks, Irish whiskey is the national spirit, with Jameson Irish Whiskey, Tullamore Dew and Bushmills being the main whiskey brands.

Poitín, made from potatoes and with an alcohol content of up to 90% ABV, is the traditional Irish moonshine, brewed illegally since 1661, when a duty was placed on whiskey and other spirits were made illegal. During this time, the name poitín was applied to inferior products. According to one guidebook, "If you see a product labelled "poteen" in an airport or a bar, it's simply a white duty-paid Irish schnapps. By definition, poteen is illegal and can't be sold." The first legally produced poitín was produced in 1987, under the condition that it was not sold in Ireland; poitín was fully legalised in 1997. It now holds GI status in the European Union.

Stout, a dark beer made using roasted oats or barley, is the national beer, with Guinness heavily promoted as a symbol of Ireland. Stout was largely unknown in Ireland when Arthur Guinness opened his brewery in 1759; the traditional beer was Irish red ale.

Irish coffee, made with coffee, whiskey, sugar and cream and invented in Foynes in 1943, has been described as the national cocktail.

=== Food ===
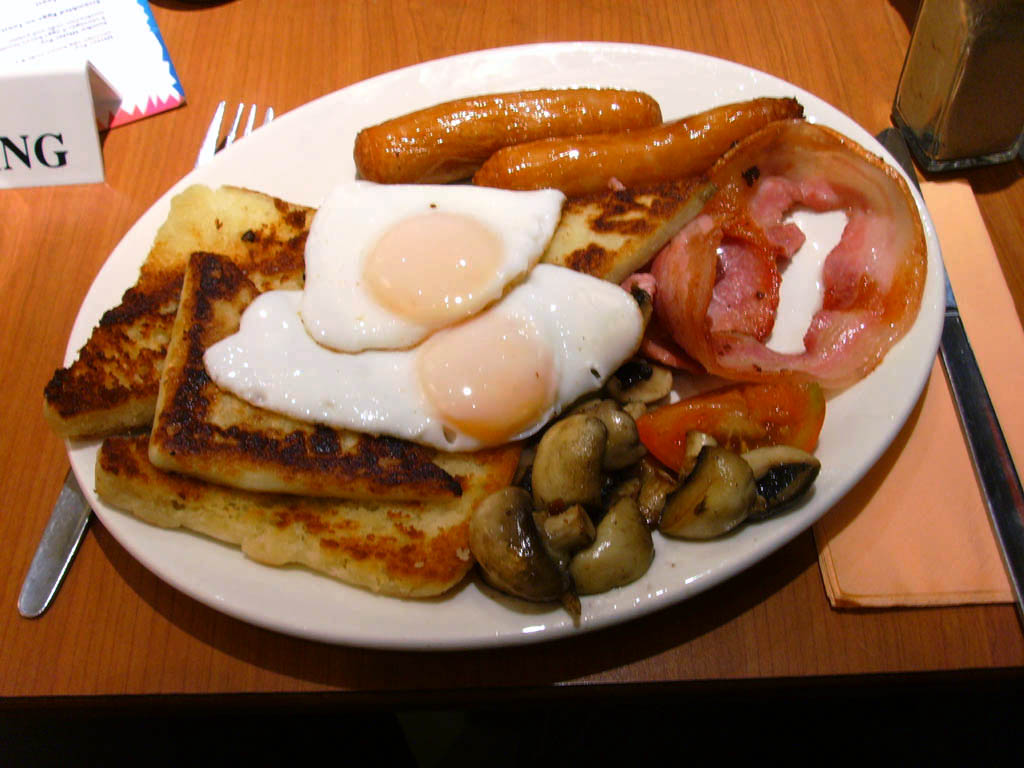
An Ulster fry

The national dish of Ireland is the Irish stew; other national dishes include the full Irish breakfast/Ulster fry and bacon and cabbage.

=== Gemstone ===
The national gemstone is Connemara marble.

=== Patron saint ===
Saint Patrick, a 5th-century missionary bishop born in Britain, is Ireland's patron saint. As he is primarily associated with Armagh and Ulster, he is also usually named as patron saint of Northern Ireland, appearing as such in the Life in the United Kingdom test.

Brigid of Kildare (c. 451–525), nicknamed "Mary of the Gaels", is also named as Ireland's patron saint, a companion to Patrick or even Ireland's "matron saint."

Columba or Colmcille (521–597) is also a patron saint of Ireland; the three are claimed to be buried together at Downpatrick.

In the Middle Ages, Viking and English colonists in Ireland advanced Edmund the Martyr (died AD 869) as a candidate for Ireland's patron saint.

=== Sport ===
Gaelic games constitute Ireland's national sports: Gaelic football, hurling, camogie, rounders, and Gaelic handball.

Irish road bowling (bullets) is another Irish sport.

=== Card game ===
Several sources give forty-fives (also called "45" or "25"), or its variant form Spoil Five, as the Irish national card game.

=== Weapon ===
Gerald of Wales saw the battle axe as Ireland's national weapon.
