= Decimal Day =

Day when the UK and Ireland decimalised the pound

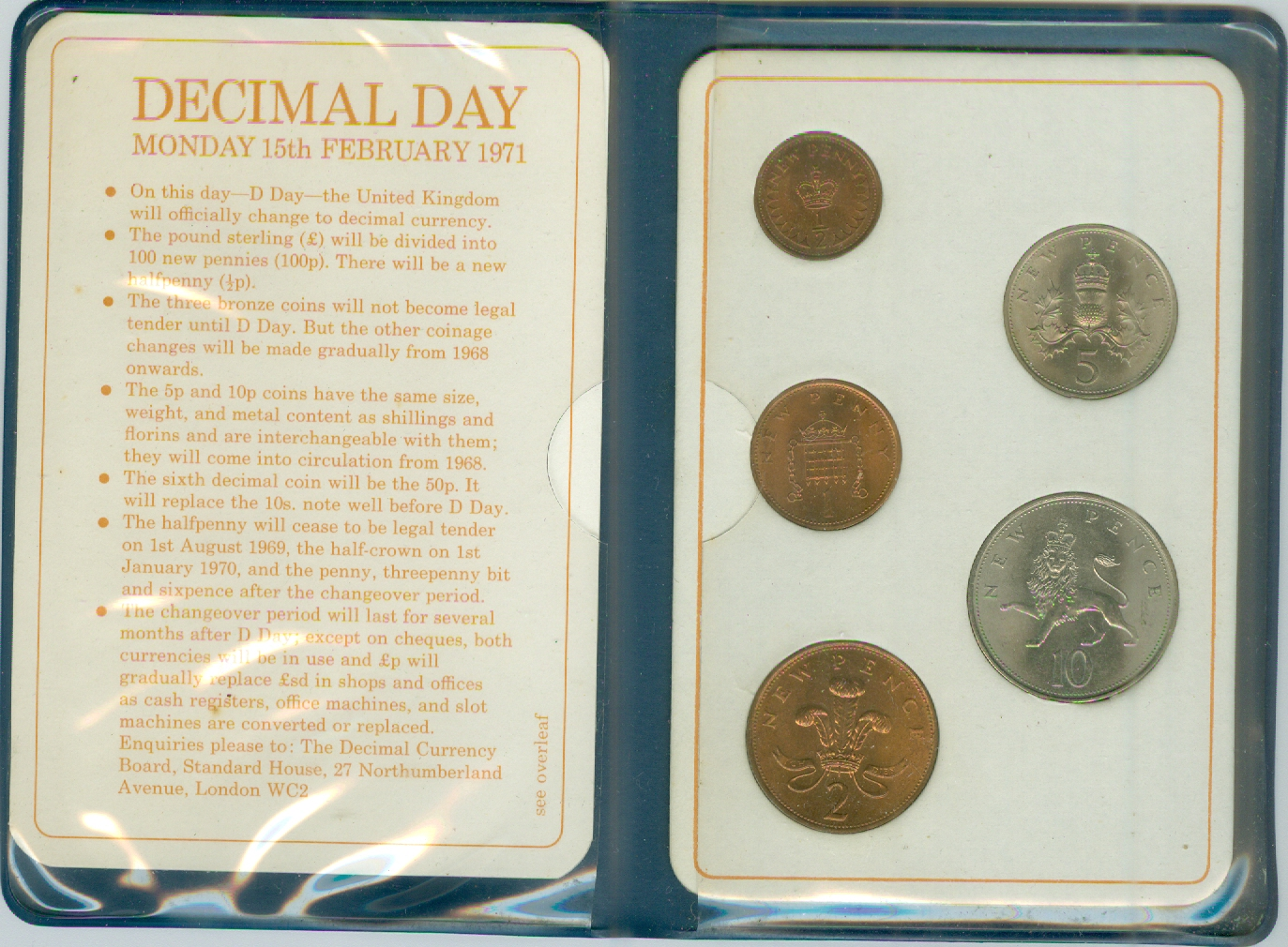
An introductory pack of the new currency

Decimal Day (Irish: Lá Deachúil) was Monday 15 February 1971, when the United Kingdom and Ireland decimalised their £sd currencies of pounds, shillings, and pence.

Until then, the British pound sterling (£) and the Irish pound (£) were divided into 20 shillings, each of 12 (old) pence, for a total of 240 pence. With decimalisation, the pound kept its old value and name in each currency, but the shilling was abolished, and the pound was divided into 100 new pence (abbreviated to "p"). In the UK, the new coins initially featured the word "new", but this would later be dropped.

Each new penny was worth 2.4 old pence ("d.") in each currency. Amounts of old pence less than 6d. or 12d. did not convert exactly into multiples of (21/2) new pence. Conversion tables were provided, showing how prices in £sd rounded to the new currency: as an example, an old value of £7, 10 shillings and sixpence, abbreviated £7 10/6 or £7 10s 6d, became £7.521/2p.

Coins of half a new penny were introduced in the UK and Ireland to maintain the approximate granularity of the old penny, but these were dropped in the UK in 1984 and in Ireland on 1 January 1987 as inflation reduced their value.

== United Kingdom ==
=== Background ===
The Russian ruble was the first decimal currency to be used in Europe, dating to 1704, though China had been using a decimal system for at least 2000 years. Elsewhere, the Coinage Act of 1792 introduced decimal currency to the United States, the first English-speaking country to adopt a decimalised currency. In France, the decimal French franc was introduced in 1795.

Before the 1970s, earlier efforts in the United Kingdom to introduce decimalised currency had failed; in 1824, the United Kingdom Parliament rejected Sir John Wrottesley's proposals to decimalise sterling, which were prompted by the introduction of the French franc three decades earlier. Following this, little progress towards decimalisation was made in the United Kingdom for over a century, with the exception of the two shilling silver florin, first issued on 1849, worth 1/10 of a pound. A double florin or four shilling piece, introduced in 1887, was a further step towards decimalisation, but failed to gain acceptance and was struck only between 1887 and 1890.

Though little further progress was made, The Decimal Association, founded in 1841 to promote decimalisation and metrication, saw interest in both causes boosted by a growing national realisation of the importance of ease in international trade, following the 1851 Great Exhibition; it was as a result of the growing interest in decimalisation that the florin was issued. In a preliminary report issued in 1857 by the Royal Commission on Decimal Coinage, the benefits and drawbacks of decimalisation were considered, but the report failed to draw any conclusions on the adoption of a change in currency. A final report in 1859 from the two remaining commissioners, Lord Overstone and Governor of the Bank of England John Hubbard, came out against the idea, claiming that it had "few merits".

In 1862, the Select committee on Weights and Measures favoured the introduction of decimalisation to accompany the introduction of metric weights and measures.

The Royal Commission on Decimal Coinage (1918–1920), chaired by Lord Emmott, reported in 1920 that the only feasible scheme was to divide the pound into 1,000 mills (the pound and mill system, first proposed in 1824), but that it would be too inconvenient to introduce. A minority of four members said that the disruption would be worthwhile. A further three members recommended that the pound should be replaced by the royal, consisting of 100 halfpennies, with there then being 4.8 royals to the former pound.

Decimal Currency Act 1967 (Note: Section 7(1).)
- Act of Parliament
- Parliament of the United Kingdom
- Long title: An Act to provide for the introduction of a decimal currency in the year 1971; and to regulate the constitution and functions of the Decimal Currency Board.
- Citation: 1967 c. 47
- Territorial extent: England and Wales; Scotland; Northern Ireland; (Note: Section 7(2).)

Dates
- Royal assent: 14 July 1967
- Commencement: 15 February 1971 (Note: The Decimal Currency (Appointed Day) Order 1968 (SI 1968/195))
- Repealed: 2 May 1986
Other legislation
Amends	Coinage Act 1870; House of Commons 1957 Disqualification Act 1957
Amended by	Coinage Act 1971; Friendly Societies Act 1974; Ministers of the Crown Act 1975; Currency Act 1982
Repealed by	Statute Law (Repeals) Act 1986
Relates to	Decimal Currency Act 1969

Status: Repealed

Text of statute as originally enacted

Decimal Currency (Appointed Day) Order 1968 (Note: Section 2.)
- Statutory Instrument
- Parliament of the United Kingdom
- Citation: SI 1968/195

Dates
- Made: 15 February 1968
- Laid before Parliament: 15 February 1968
Other legislation
Made under	Decimal Currency Act 1967

Status: Current legislation

Text of statute as originally enacted

Decimal Currency Act 1969 (Note: Section 19(1).)
- Act of Parliament
- Parliament of the United Kingdom
- Long title: An Act to make further provision in connection with the introduction of a decimal currency, and to impose restrictions on the melting or breaking of metal coins.
- Citation: 1969 c. 19
- Territorial extent: England and Wales; Scotland; Ireland; (Note: Section 18.)

Dates
- Royal assent: 16 May 1969
- Commencement: 15 February 1971 (section 1, section 15(1), 15(2), 15(3), 15(6) and 15(8)); 16 May 1969 (rest of act) (Note: Section 19(2). The Acts of Parliament (Commencement) Act 1793.)
Other legislation
Amends	Habeas Corpus Act 1679; Coinage Act 1870; Allotments Act 1950
Repeals/revokes	Gold and Silver (Export Control, &c.) Act 1920
Amended by	Coinage Act 1971; Northern Ireland Constitution Act 1973; Consumer Credit Act 1974; Friendly Societies Act 1974; Statute Law (Repeals) Act 1989; Law Reform (Miscellaneous Provisions) (Northern Ireland) Order 2005; Financial Services Act 2012
Relates to	Decimal Currency Act 1967

Status: Amended

Text of statute as originally enacted

Text of the Decimal Currency Act 1969 as in force today (including any amendments) within the United Kingdom, from legislation.gov.uk.

In 1960, a report prepared jointly by the British Association for the Advancement of Science and the Association of British Chambers of Commerce, followed by the success of decimalisation in South Africa, prompted the Government to set up the Committee of the Inquiry on Decimal Currency (Halsbury Committee) in 1961, which reported in 1963. The adoption of the changes suggested in the report was announced on 1 March 1966. The Decimal Currency Board (DCB) was created to manage the transition, but the plans were only approved by Parliament with the Decimal Currency Act 1967 (c. 47). The former Greater London Council leader Bill Fiske was named as the chairman of the Decimal Currency Board.

Consideration was given to introducing a new major unit of currency worth ten shillings in the old currency. Suggested names included the "new pound", the "royal" and the "noble". It would have resulted in the "decimal penny" being worth only slightly more than the old penny, an approach adopted in South Africa, Australia and New Zealand in the 1960s, adopting respectively the South African rand, Australian dollar and New Zealand dollar equal in value to 10 shillings. However, Halsbury decided that the pound sterling's importance as a reserve currency meant that the pound should remain unchanged.

=== Preparation ===
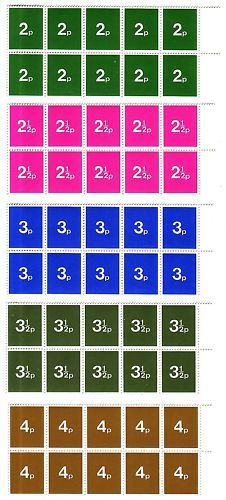
British decimalisation training stamps in the same colours and values as the upcoming decimal stamps

Under the new system, the pound was retained, but was divided into 100 new pence, denoted by the symbol p. New coinage was issued alongside the old coins. The 5p and 10p coins were introduced in April 1968 and were the same size, composition and value as the shilling and two shilling coins in circulation with them. In October 1969, the 50p coin was introduced, with the 10s. note withdrawn on 20 November 1970. This reduced the number of new coins required to be introduced on Decimal Day, meaning that the British public would already be familiar with three of the six new coins. Small booklets were made available, containing some or all of the new denominations.

The old halfpenny was withdrawn from circulation on 31 July 1969, and the half-crown (2s. 6d.) followed on 31 December to ease the transition. The farthing, last minted in 1956, had already ceased to be legal tender in 1961.

A substantial publicity campaign took place in the weeks before Decimal Day, including a song by Max Bygraves called "Decimalisation". The BBC broadcast a series of five-minute programmes, titled "Decimal Five", to which The Scaffold contributed some specially written tunes. ITV repeatedly broadcast a short drama called Granny Gets The Point starring Doris Hare, in which an elderly woman who does not understand the new system is taught to use it by her grandson. On 15 February and again the following week, BBC 1 broadcast "New Money Day", a Merry-Go Round schools' programme in which puppet maker Peter Firmin and his small friend Muskit encountered different prices and new coins when they visited various shops.

Businesses and government departments devised and implemented staff training for recording and processing financial information using the new currency.

Banks received stocks of the new coins in advance, which were issued to retailers shortly before Decimal Day to enable them to give change immediately after the changeover. Banks were closed from 3:30 p.m. on Wednesday 10 February 1971 to 10:00 a.m. on Monday 15 February, (Note: At the time, a normal banking day for retail customers was 10:00 to 15:30, so in effect the banks were closed to customers for just two days.) to enable all outstanding cheques and credits in the clearing system to be processed and customers' account balances to be converted from £sd to decimal. In many banks, the conversion was done manually, as few bank branches were then computerised. February had been chosen for Decimal Day because it was the quietest time of the year for the banks, shops and transport organisations.

Many items were priced in both currencies for some time before and after the change. Prior to Decimal Day, items priced in both currencies had displayed the price in pre-decimalised currency first, with the price in decimal currency last in parentheses. From Decimal Day onwards, this order was reversed, with decimal currency presented first, and pre-decimal currency last in parentheses; for example, 1s (5p) would become 5p (1s). This latter order was used on most football programmes during the 1970–71 season. High-denomination (10p, 20p and 50p) stamps were issued on 17 June 1970. Post offices were issued with simplified training stamps in the same colours as the upcoming decimal stamps.

Exceptions to the 15 February introduction of decimalisation were British Rail and London Transport, which had gone decimal one day early, the former urging customers, if they chose to use pennies or threepenny pieces, to pay them in multiples of 6d (21/2p, the lowest common multiple of the two systems).

Conversion tables were provided, showing how prices in £sd rounded to the new currency: this including saying 3d was equivalent to 1p though 9d was equivalent to 4p. This led to some anomalies: school meals were charged at 1s 9d a day or 8s 9d for a five-day week; these became 9p a day or 45p a week despite the conversion tables suggesting 8s 9d should be 44p.

=== After Decimal Day ===
Because of extensive preparations and the publicity campaigns organised by the British government, Decimal Day itself went smoothly. Some criticisms – such as the fact that the new halfpenny coin was relatively small, and that some traders had taken advantage of the transition to raise their prices – were levelled, despite the fact that in the latter case, overall price adjustments slightly favoured the consumer. Some people used new pennies as sixpences in vending machines. After 15 February, shops continued to accept payment in old coins but always issued change in new coins. The old coins were then returned to banks, so most of them were quickly taken out of circulation.

The new halfpenny, penny, and twopence coins were introduced on 15 February 1971. Within two weeks of Decimal Day, the old penny (1d) and old threepence (3d) coins had left circulation, and old sixpences had become somewhat rare. On 31 August 1971, the 1d and 3d were officially withdrawn from circulation, ending the transition period to decimal currency.

The government intended that in speech, the new units would be called "new pence"; however, the British public quickly began to refer to pennies as "pee" when shortened, with "10p" pronounced as "ten pee" instead of "ten new pence". Other shortenings previously common, such as "tuppence", were now rarely heard, and terms such as "tanner" (used for the silver sixpence), which previously designated amounts of money, were no longer used. However, some slang terms, such as "quid" and "bob", previously used for pounds and shillings respectively, survived from pre-decimal times. Amounts denominated in guineas (21s or £1.05) were reserved still for specialist transactions, and continued to be used in the sale of horses and at some auctions, amongst others.

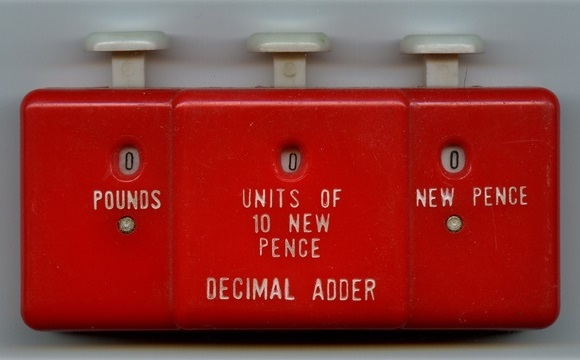
A "Decimal Adder"

The public information campaign over the preceding two years helped, as well as the trick of getting a rough conversion of new pence into old shillings and pence by simply doubling the number of new pence and placing a solidus, or slash, between the digits: 17p multiplied by 2 = 34, – approximately equal to 3/4 ("three and four", or three shillings and four pence), with a similar process for the reverse conversion. The willingness of Britain's younger population to embrace decimalisation also helped, with elderly people having greater difficulty in adapting; the phrase "How much is that in old money?", or even "How much is that in real money?" became associated with those who struggled with the change, before in the following decades coming to refer to conversions between metric and imperial weights and measures. In shops from Decimal Day onwards, new stock would be universally priced in "new money", though in smaller shops such as newsagents, it was still possible to find stock priced in £sd for several years after 1971; however, remaining stock priced in £sd would still be charged in its equivalent in decimal currency.

Around Decimal Day, "Decimal Adders" and other converters were available to help people convert between the old and new coins. The following is a table showing conversions between the decimal and pre-decimal systems.

Pre-decimal		Decimal
Common name	Amount (shillings/pence)	Decimal
(new) pence		1p = £0.01
Farthing	1/4d.	1/48s ≈ 0.104p
Halfpenny	1/2d.	1/24s ≈ 0.208p
Penny	1d.	1/12s ≈ 0.417p
Threepence	3d.	11/4p
Sixpence	6d.	21/2p
Shilling	1/-	5p
Florin/Two shillings	2/-	10p
Half crown	2/6d.	121/2p
Crown	5/-	25p
Pound	20/-	£1 = 100p
Guinea	21/-	£1.05 = 105p

=== Response to decimalisation ===
In response to the change, some new coins were defaced, stamped with phrases such as "DUD", despite being an offence under the Coinage Act.

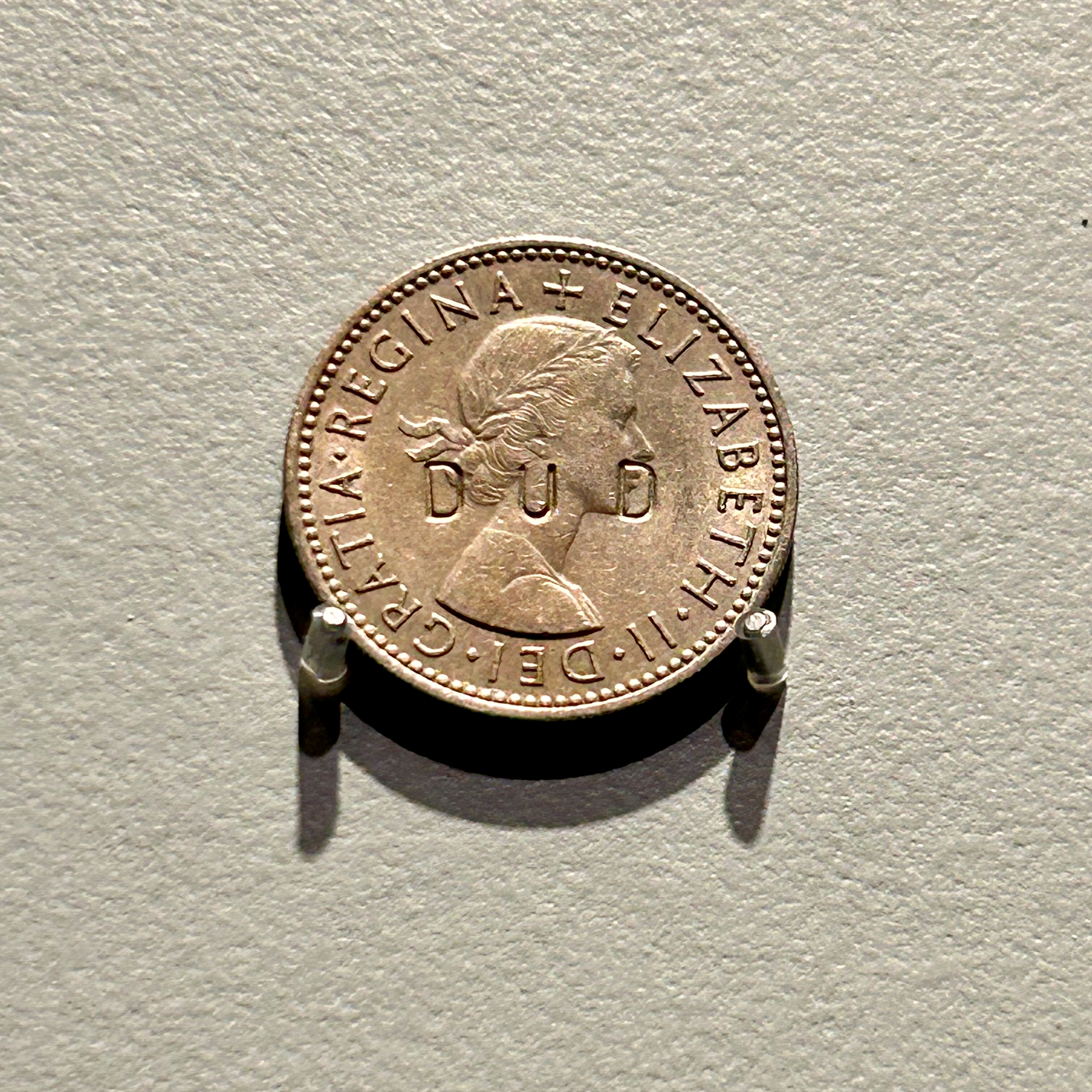
One shilling coin stamped "DUD"

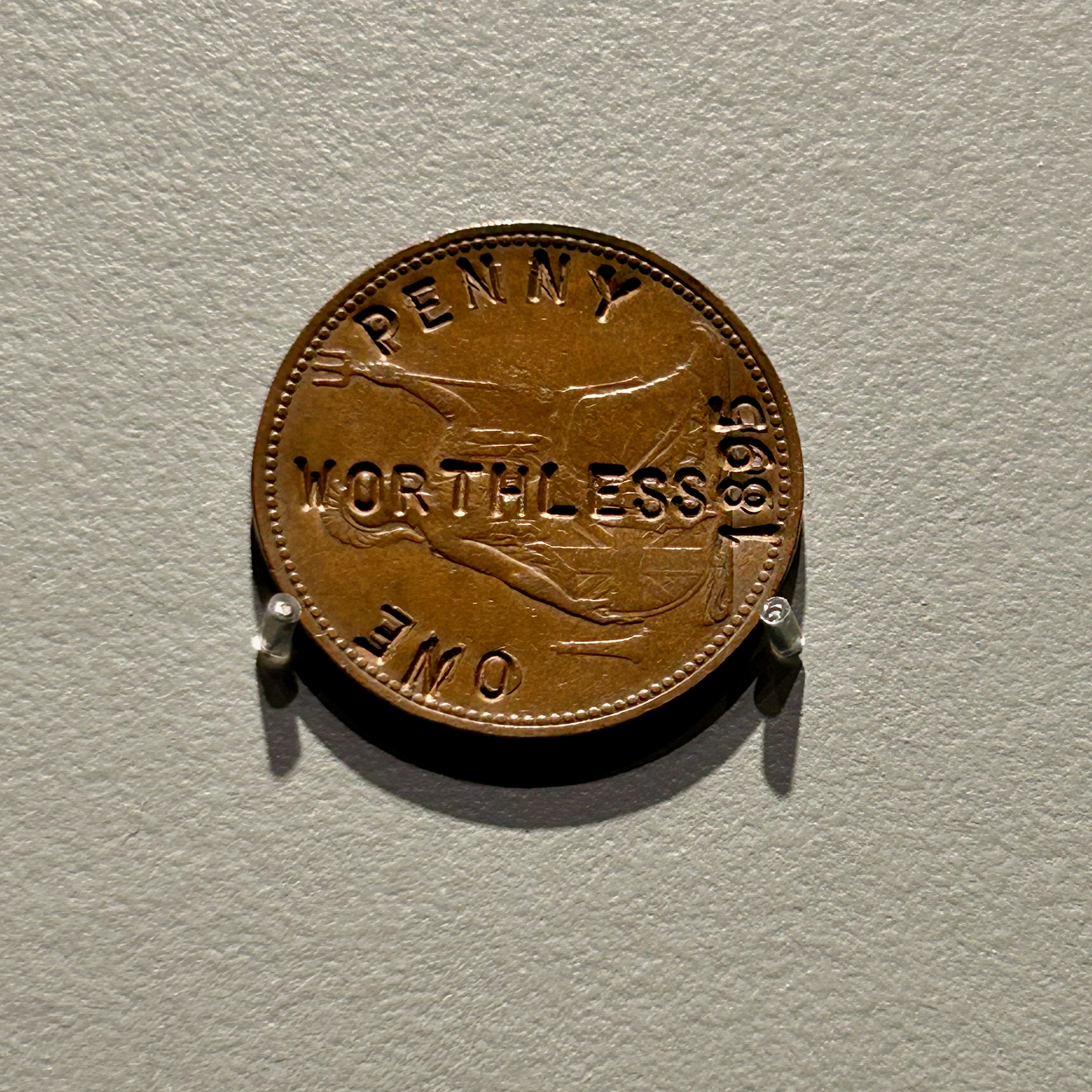
Penny stamped with "WORTHLESS"

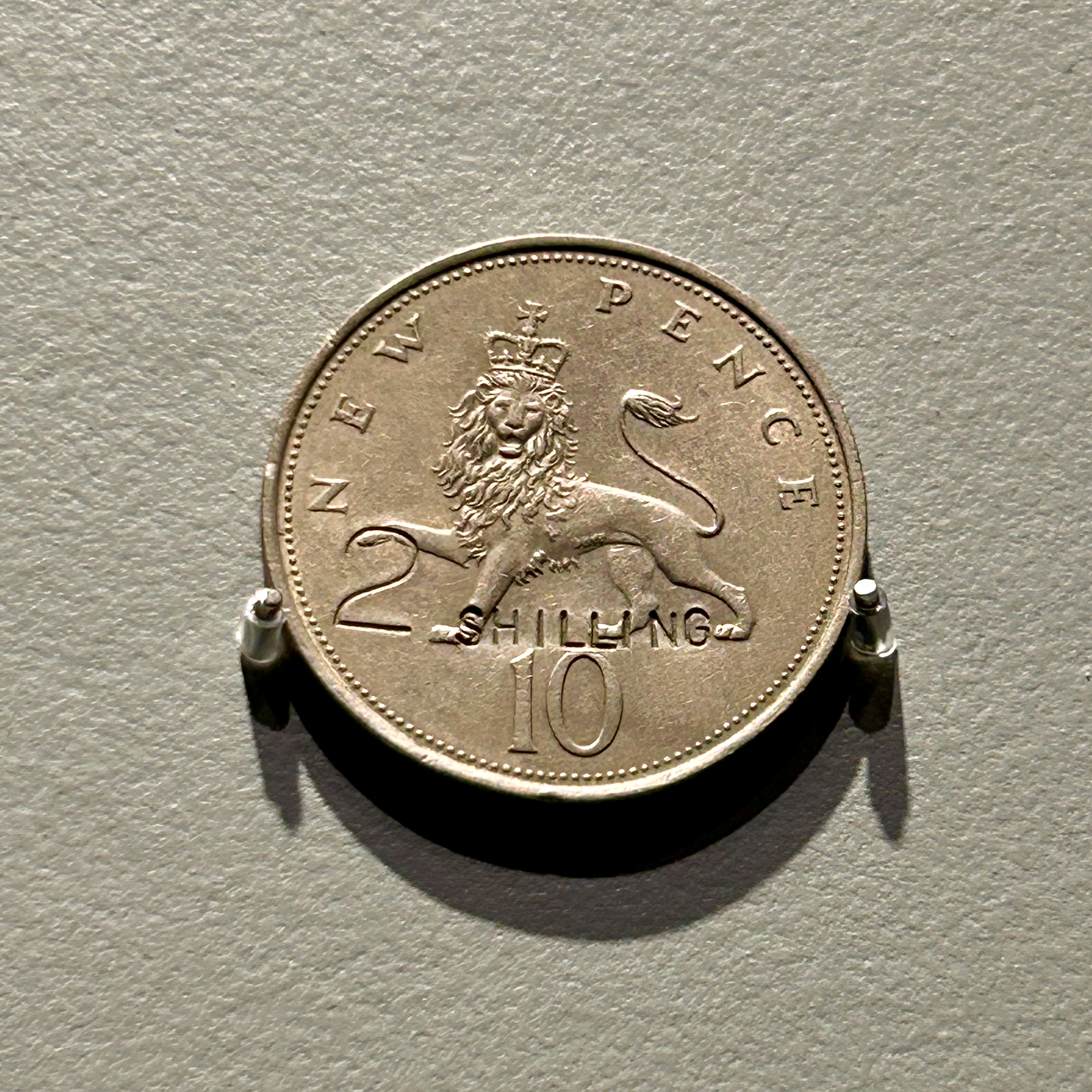
10 New Pence coin stamped "2 SHILLING"

=== Validity of old coins ===
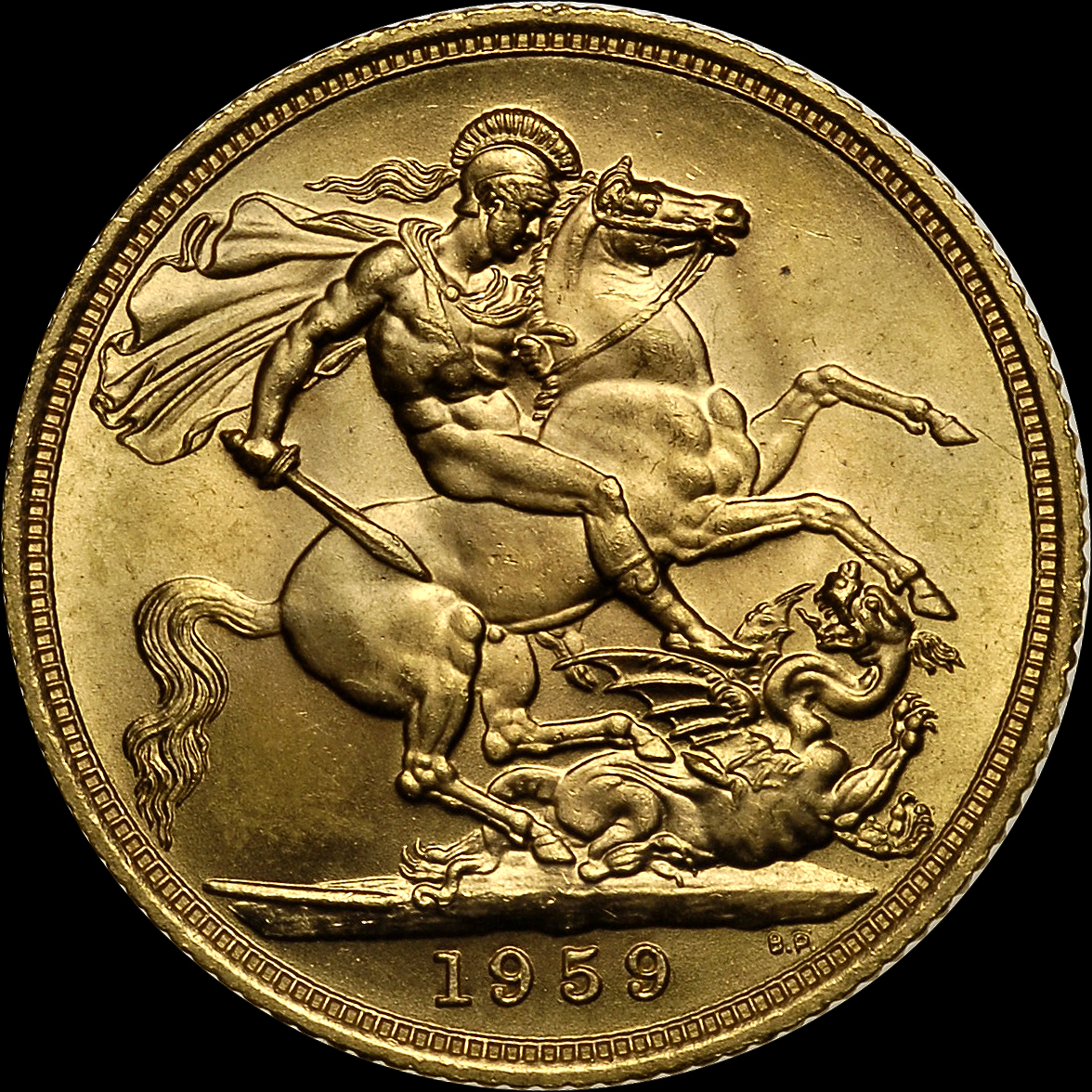
Along with a few other non-circulating coins, sovereigns (including half, double and quintuple sovereigns) survived decimalisation, and remain legal tender to date, though they have far greater worth as bullion coins and as numismatic collectibles than their face value.

All pre-decimal coins, except for certain non-circulating coins such as crowns, sovereigns and double florins which were explicitly excluded from demonetisation, are now no longer legal tender. Several other pre-decimal coins remained in circulation beyond 1971 (see below), but have now all been withdrawn following changes to the standards and specifications of circulating coinage.

=== Sixpences ===
The sixpence (6d), worth exactly 21/2p, was withdrawn in June 1980. This enabled the withdrawal of the decimal half-penny coin in 1984.

=== Shillings and florins ===
Shillings and florins, together with their same sized 5p and 10p coin equivalents, coexisted in circulation as valid currency until the early 1990s. In theory, this would have included coins dating back to 1816, but in practice, the oldest were dated 1947, as older coins contained silver, meaning the value of their metal was worth more than their nominal value.

The coins were withdrawn when smaller 5p and 10p coins were introduced in 1990 and 1992 respectively. The demonetisation of the larger-size 50p in 1998 means that there are now no sterling coins in everyday circulation dated earlier than 1971.

=== Maundy money ===
The face value of Maundy money coins was maintained, increasing all their face values by a factor of 2.4, as the coins continued to be legal tender as new pence. The numismatic value of each coin, though, greatly exceeds face value.

=== Commemorative issues ===
Commemorative 'decimal' Crowns dated 1972, 1977, 1980 and 1981 remain legal tender (with a face value of 25p) as do the £5 coins issued from 1990 onwards.

=== Subsequent changes ===
The decimal halfpenny (1/2p), which had been introduced in 1971, remained in circulation until 1984, when its value had been greatly reduced by inflation. It was not struck, save for collectors' sets, following 1983, with those dated 1984 struck only as proofs, or in uncirculated mint sets. The decimal halfpenny was demonetised on 31 December 1984. The 50p piece was reduced in size in 1997, following the reduction in size of the 5p in 1990 and the 10p in 1992 (the large versions of all the three have been demonetised). The 1p and 2p underwent a compositional change from bronze to plated steel in 1992. However, both coins remain valid back to 1971, the only circulating coins on Decimal Day that are still valid.

In 1982, the word "new" in "new penny" or "new pence" was removed from the inscriptions on coins, and was replaced by the number of pence in the denomination (for example, "ten pence" or "fifty pence"). This coincided with the introduction of a new 20p coin, which from the outset bore simply the legend "twenty pence".

A £1 coin was introduced into circulation in 1983, and a £2 coin in 1998 (although a series of commemorative uni-metallic £2 coins had been issued between 1986 and 1996 to celebrate special occasions).

== Ireland ==
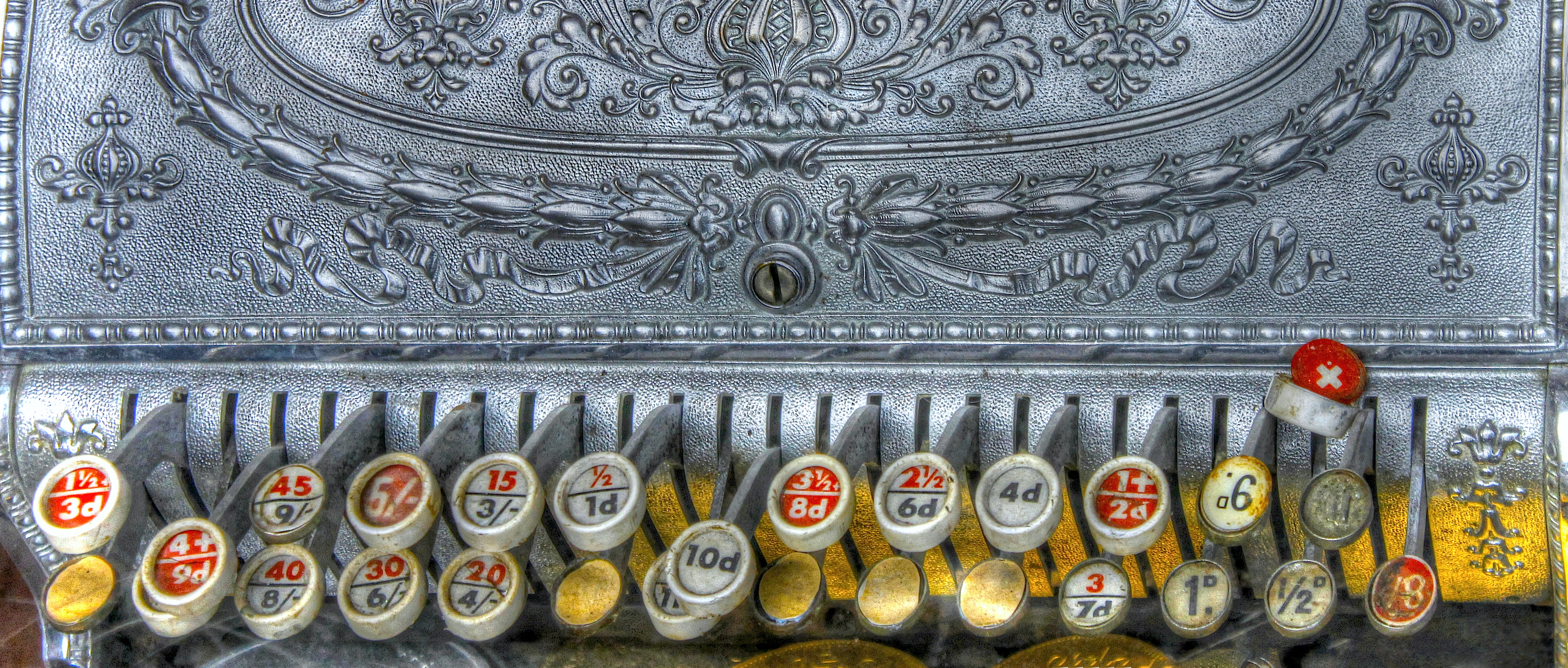
Cash register in Ireland; the keys have values in "new pence" above and pre-decimal equivalents below.

When the old £sd system (consisting of pounds, shillings, and pence) was in operation, the United Kingdom and Ireland operated within the sterling area, effectively a single monetary area. The Irish pound was created as a separate currency in 1927 with distinct coins and notes, but the terms of the Currency Act 1927 obliged the Irish currency commissioners to redeem Irish pounds on a fixed 1:1 basis, and so day-to-day banking operations continued exactly as they had been before the creation of the Irish pound. The Irish pound was decimalised on 15 February 1971, the same date as the British pound.

This arrangement continued until 1979 when Irish obligations to the European Monetary System led to Ireland breaking the historic link with sterling.

In Ireland, all pre-decimal coins, except the 1s, 2s and 10s coins, were called in during the initial process between 1969 and 1972; the ten shilling coin, which, as recently issued and in any event equivalent to 50p, was permitted to remain outstanding (though due to silver content, the coin did not circulate widely). The 1s and 2s were recalled in 1993 and 1994, respectively. Pre-decimal Irish coins may still be redeemed at their face value equivalent in euros at the Central Bank in Dublin.

Pre-decimal Irish coins were denoted with s for shillings and d for pence, abbreviations derived from the Latin solidi and denarii, in contrast to stamps, which instead bore Irish-language abbreviations (scilling ("shilling", abbreviated "s") and pingin ("penny", abbreviated "p")). After decimalisation, coins were marked with the Irish-language abbreviations. While British stamps switched from 'd' to 'p', Irish stamps (unlike the coins) printed the number with no accompanying letter; so a stamp worth 2 new pence was marked '2p' in the UK and simply '2' in Ireland.

The following is a table showing conversions between the Irish decimal and pre-decimal systems. It is identical to the British one, except for lacking most higher-value coins.

Pre-decimal		Decimal
Coin name	Amount (shillings/pence)	Decimal
Farthing	1/4d	0.104p
Halfpenny	1/2d.	0.208p
Penny	1d	0.417p
Threepence	3d	11/4p
Sixpence	6d	21/2p
Shilling	1/-	5p
Florin	2/-	10p
Half crown	2/6	121/2p
Ten shillings	10/-	50p

Ireland's new decimal coinage had face values of 1/2p, 1p, 2p, 5p, 10p and 50p.

The old shilling coin continued to circulate with a value of 5 new pence, and the old florin with a value of 10 new pence. Unlike in the UK, where the sixpence continued to circulate at a value of 21/2p, the Irish sixpence was withdrawn from circulation after decimalisation. The ten-shilling note was withdrawn from circulation, but the other Series A banknotes continued in use.

=== Subsequent changes ===
A twenty-pence coin was introduced in 1986. The decimal halfpenny (1/2p) remained in circulation until 1987, when its value had been greatly reduced by inflation. Very few were produced after the initial minting.

In 1990, the pound coin was introduced, and in 1992 the 5p and 10p coins were reduced in size. The old shilling and florin coins ceased to be legal tender at the same time.

The Irish pound coins were withdrawn from circulation in 2002, to be replaced by the euro.

== See also ==
- Banknotes of the pound sterling
- Banknotes of the Republic of Ireland
- Introduction of the euro

== Sources ==
- The Royal Mint, All Change: 25th Anniversary of Decimal Currency in Britain (pamphlet distributed with 1996 Royal Mint silver proof sets)
