= Threepence =

Threepence, or thrupence (3d), may refer to:

- Threepence (Australian coin), a pre-decimalisation coin
- Threepence (British coin), a pre-decimalisation coin
- Threepence (Irish coin), a pre-decimalisation coin
- Threepence (New Zealand coin), a pre-decimalisation coin
- Brass threepence, a British pre-decimalisation coin

== See also ==
- Sixpence (disambiguation)
- Twopence (disambiguation)
- Five pence (disambiguation)
- Ten pence (disambiguation)
- 20P (disambiguation)
- Twenty-five pence (British coin)
- Fifty pence (disambiguation)
- Three-cent piece, a United States coin
