= Ten pence =

Ten pence may refer to:

- Ten pence (British coin), a coin of the United Kingdom
- Ten pence (Irish coin), a former coin of the Republic of Ireland

== See also ==
- Two pence
- Threepence (disambiguation)
- Five pence (disambiguation)
- Sixpence (disambiguation)
- 20P (disambiguation)
- Twenty-five pence
- Fifty pence (disambiguation)
