= Fifty pence (Irish coin) =

Denomination of the Irish pound

Fifty pence / Caoga pingin
- Ireland
- Value: 50 pence
- Mass: 13.5 g
- Diameter: 30.0 mm
- Thickness: 3.15 mm
- Edge: Plain
- Composition: Cupronickel
- Years of minting: 1970–1988, 1996–2000
- Catalog number: —

Obverse
- Design: Irish harp
- Design date: 1970 (first use 1928)

Reverse
- Design: Eurasian woodcock
- Designer: Percy Metcalfe
- Design date: 1970 (first use 1928)

The fifty pence (50p) (Irish: caoga pingin) coin was a subdivision of the Irish pound. It was introduced in Ireland on 17 February 1970. It replaced the ten-shilling coin and ten-shilling note when decimalised, and due to this conversion, it was introduced a year before Decimal Day in 1971.

It is a seven-sided coin, an equilateral curve heptagon of constant breadth (3 centimetres) and mass 13.5 grams. The sides are not straight but are curved so that the centre of curvature is the opposite apex of the coin – this is an equilateral curve which allowed the coin to roll freely in vending machines. It was the same shape and size as the British coin of the same denomination, as both nations' pounds were pegged until 1979. The coin used the woodcock design from the pre-decimal farthing coin, introduced to the Irish Free State in 1928.

Dublin Millennium 50 pence coin

On 31 May 1988, a special design was circulated for the "Dublin Millennium", although Dublin is thought to have been founded by the Vikings around 841 – the issue was regarded as for publicity and collectors only.

The millennium coin was the first decimal to feature words on it: the word DUBLIN in Roman script and ÁṪ CLIAṪ in Gaelic type, its equivalent in the Irish language. The coin was designed by Tom Ryan, who would later design the Irish pound coin. About 5 million of these were produced, with 50 thousand proof coins also being produced.

Production of fifty pence coins ceased between 1988 and 1996 because of previous oversupply and because of reduced demand following the introduction of the twenty pence coin. The coin was withdrawn on the advent of the euro in 2002, with its last minting issue in 2000.
