= Irish penny coin =

Irish penny coin may refer to:

- Penny (Irish pre-decimal coin)
- Penny (Irish decimal coin)
