= Halfpenny (Irish decimal coin) =

Denomination of the Irish pound

Halfpenny / Leathphingin
- Ireland
- Value: 1/2 penny
- Mass: 1.78 g
- Diameter: 17.14 mm
- Thickness: approx. 1 mm
- Edge: Plain
- Composition: Bronze
- Years of minting: 1971–1986
- Catalog number: —

Obverse
- Design: Irish harp
- Design date: 1971 (first use 1928)

Reverse
- Design: Ornamental bird
- Designer: Gabriel Hayes
- Design date: 1971

The decimal halfpenny (1/2p) (Irish: leathphingin) coin was the smallest denomination of the Irish pound. It was first issued when the Irish currency was decimalised on Decimal Day, 15 February 1971. It was one of three new designs introduced all in bronze and featuring ornamental birds on the reverse. The coin value was weakened by inflation and very few were produced beyond the initial run for 1971. It was removed from circulation and demonetised on 1 January 1987.

== Overview ==
The main reason that halfpennies were issued was that when shillings were decimalised they were worth five new pence, so a sixpence (half of a shilling) yielded a value of 21/2 new pence.

Its dimensions and appearance were the same as the British coin of the same denomination as the pounds of Britain and Ireland were pegged until 1979.

The coin was designed by the Irish artist Gabriel Hayes and the design is adapted from the manuscript Cologne Collectio Canonum (Cologne, Dombibliothek Cod. 213) in Cologne. The coin has a diameter of 1.7145 centimetres and mass of 1.782 grams consisting of copper, tin and zinc.

The coin was worth 1/200 of an Irish pound.

The 1985 version of this coin is particularly rare, and valuable to coin collectors – the vast majority of the 2.8 million were melted in 1987. The 1986 coin was only produced for the 1986 specimen sets and is also rare.

== See also ==
- St Patrick halfpenny
