= Farthing (Irish coin) =

Denomination of the pre-decimal Irish pound

Farthing / Feoirling
- Ireland
- Value: 1/4d penny
- Mass: 2.83495 g
- Diameter: 20.2 mm (51/64 in or 0.796875 in) mm
- Thickness: 1.52 mm (1/16 in or 0.0625 in) mm
- Edge: Plain
- Composition: Bronze (95.5% copper, 3% tin, 1.5% zinc)
- Years of minting: 1928–1966
- Catalog number: —

Obverse
- Design: Irish harp
- Design date: 1928

Reverse
- Design: Woodcock
- Designer: Percy Metcalfe
- Design date: 1928

The farthing (1/4d) (Irish: feoirling) was the lowest value coin of the pre-decimal Irish pound, worth a quarter of a penny, 1/48 of a shilling or 1/960 of a pound. The coin had lost much of its value through inflation long before decimalisation in 1971, and during the 1960s no farthings were produced for general circulation; those minted in 1966 were produced for collectors' sets.

The coins officially measured 0.796875 inches (20.2406 mm) in diameter and weighed 2.83495 grams (1/10 oz). The bronze coin is (was) made up of 95.5% copper, 3% tin and 1.5% zinc. It was introduced in 1928 to replace the British farthing and ceased to be legal tender on 1 August 1969. As the Irish pound was pegged to the British pound until 1979, the Irish farthing had the same dimensions and weight as the British version.

The reverse design featuring a woodcock was by English artist Percy Metcalfe. The obverse featured the Irish harp. From 1928 through 1937 the date was split either side of the harp with the name Saorstát Éireann circling around. From 1938 through 1966 the inscription changed to Éire on the left of the harp and the date on the right. The woodcock was reused on the decimal 50p coin introduced in 1970.

Ireland is one of only four nations (the others being Britain, South Africa, and Jamaica) to issue farthing coins in the 20th century.

Irish farthings, like all non-current Irish coins, may be redeemed for euros at the Central Bank of Ireland in Dublin. Due to its slight value (€0.00132), several must be redeemed to have any return at all.

== See also ==
- St Patrick halfpenny
- £sd
