= Dalway harp =

Irish harp

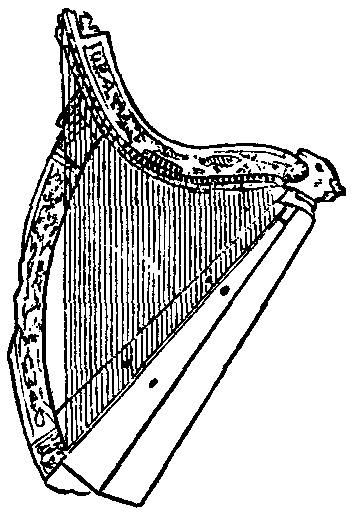
An old drawing of the Dalway harp from the 13th ed. Encyclopædia Britannica

The Dalway harp, Cloyne harp, or Fitzgerald harp is an early modern Irish harp whose extant fragments are in the National Museum of Ireland – Decorative Arts and History. It was made in 1621 by Donnchadh fitz Teig (Donatus Filius Thadei) for Sir John MacEdmond Fitzgerald of Cloyne in County Cork (grandson of John Fitzedmund Fitzgerald of Youghal). Richly carved, with 52 strings, it was originally painted in bright colours and has inscriptions in Latin and Irish, including Ego sum regina citherarum "I am the queen of harps". These were translated by Eugene O'Curry. It was described in 1809 in Edward Bunting's Irish Melodies, which has an engraving of it as its frontispiece. At that time it was owned by the Dalway family of Bellahill, Carrickfergus, County Antrim. Correspondence from about 1849 records that Marriott Dalway snr believed the harp had been "found in a bog near Larne". By 1809 the sound board had been lost; in 1849 Dalway said it had been lent to a "Mrs Sherrard, a native of Dungannon ... living in Thorndale, Dublin" to transcribe its inscriptions; however, Armstrong says it was the forearm (pillar) that was lent to Sherrard, since only one piece, probably the harmonic curve (neck), was exhibited in Belfast in 1852. The remains came into the Royal Irish Academy collection in 1876/7. Along with the Trinity College Harp, it was one of two harps used as a model for the harp on the obverse of the coins of the Irish Free State. Several reconstructions have been made, replacing the missing sound board, including at the Irish Industrial Exhibition in Cork in 1852, and for the National Museum in the 1990s.
