= Currency Act 1982 =

Act of the Parliament of the United Kingdom

Currency Act 1982 (Note: Section 2.)
- Act of Parliament
- Parliament of the United Kingdom
- Long title: An Act to replace section 1(1) of the Decimal Currency Act 1967 so as to sanction references to the new penny as the penny.
- Citation: 1982 c. 3
- Territorial extent: United Kingdom

Dates
- Royal assent: 2 February 1982
- Commencement: 2 February 1982 (Note: Section 4(b) of the Interpretation Act 1978.)
Other legislation
| Amends | Decimal Currency Act 1967 |
| Relates to | Decimal Currency Act 1969 |

Status: Current legislation

Text of statute as originally enacted

Revised text of statute as amended

Text of the Currency Act 1982 as in force today (including any amendments) within the United Kingdom, from legislation.gov.uk.

The Currency Act 1982 (c. 3) is an act of the Parliament of the United Kingdom.

== Background ==
The Decimal Currency Act 1967 paved the way for the decimalisation of the pound sterling by redefining the denominations of money to "the pound sterling and the new penny, the new penny being one-hundredth part of a pound sterling". Up until then, the pound had consisted of 20 shillings each of 12 pennies; this change formally taking place on 15 February 1971 (a day known as Decimal Day). All decimal coins subsequently issued by the Royal Mint included the text "NEW PENCE" on the reverse (or "NEW PENNY" in the case of the 1/2 p and 1p coins), a term that was in everyday use for a significant period afterwards, particularly by the elderly, however by the early 1980s the use of the term "new" had fallen out of use.

== Provisions ==
Because the term "new penny" was defined in law, a change in the law would be needed for coins to keep up with common parlance. The act changed the definition in the 1967 act so that the denominations of money in the currency would be the "pound sterling and the penny or new penny", with the word "New" being with the value of the coin (e.g. "Two Pence" instead of "New Pence").

The act also repealed section 1(1) of the Decimal Currency Act 1967, the remainder of that act being repealed in 1986.
