= Irish pound =

Currency of Ireland before 2002

Punt Éireannach (Irish)
- £1 coin (1990–2002)

ISO 4217
- Code: IEP

Units of account
- Base unit: pound
- Plural: pounds (English) puint, punta (Irish)
- Symbol: £
- Nickname: quid
- Subunit
- 1/100: penny (English) pingin (Irish)
- Plural
- penny (English) pingin (Irish): pence (English) pinginí, pingineacha (Irish)
- Symbol
- penny (English) pingin (Irish): p

Denominations
- Banknotes
- Freq. used: £5, £10, £20
- Rarely used: £50, £100
- Coins
- Freq. used: 1p, 2p, 5p, 10p, 20p, 50p, £1

Demographics
- User(s): Ireland; Irish Free State; Kingdom of Ireland

Issuance
- Central bank: Currency Commission of Ireland (1927-1943); Central Bank of Ireland (1943-2002)
- Website: www.centralbank.ie
- Printer: Currency Centre of the Central Bank of Ireland
- Mint: Currency Centre of the Central Bank of Ireland

Valuation

EU Exchange Rate Mechanism (ERM)
- Since: 13 March 1979
- Fixed rate since: 31 December 1998
- Replaced by euro, non cash: 1 January 1999
- Replaced by euro, cash: 1 March 2002
- 1 € =: £0.787564 (irrevocable)
- This infobox shows the latest status before this currency was rendered obsolete.

The pound (Irish: punt) was the currency of Ireland until 2002. Its ISO 4217 code was IEP, and the symbol was £ (or IR£ for distinction). The Irish pound was replaced by the euro on 1 January 1999. Euro currency did not start circulating until the beginning of 2002.

== First pound ==
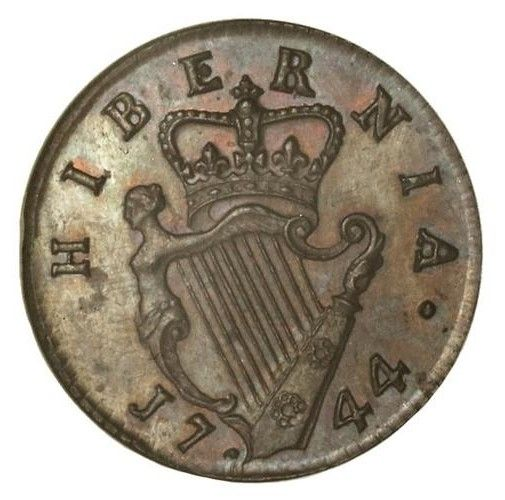
Farthing of 1744 with harp, crown and legend "Hibernia"

The earliest Irish coinage was introduced in the late 10th century, with an £sd system of one pound divided into twenty shillings, each of twelve silver pence. Parity with sterling was established by King John around 1210, so that Irish silver could move freely into the English economy and help to finance his wars in France. However, in 1460, King Henry VI summoned a parliament at Drogheda which passed legislation to devalue Irish coins. This caused them to be minted with a different silver content than those of England, so that the values of the two currencies diverged.

During the Williamite War of 1689–1691, King James II, no longer reigning in England and Scotland, issued an emergency base-metal coinage known as gun money.

In 1701, a proclamation stated one English shilling was equal to 1s. 1d. in Irish, making it possible for Irish copper coins to circulate with English silver coins. In 1737, the gold guinea coin was fixed at 21s. English or 22/9 Irish (i.e. 252 pence and 273 pence respectively). This effectively pegged the Irish pound to the English at a ratio of 13:12 in both gold and silver, i.e. an Irish pound was worth 12/13 of an English pound. (The Pound Scots had yet another value; it was absorbed into sterling in 1707 at a ratio of 12 to 1.) In 1801, the Kingdom of Ireland became part of the United Kingdom, but the Irish pound continued to circulate until January 1826. Between 1804 and 1813, silver tokens worth 10d were issued by the Bank of Ireland and were denominated in pence Irish. The last copper coins of the Irish pound were minted in 1823, and in 1826 the Irish pound was merged with the pound sterling. After 1826, some Irish banks continued to issue paper currency, but these were denominated in sterling, and no more distinctly Irish coins were minted until the creation of the Irish Free State in the 20th century.

== Second pound ==
=== Saorstát pound ===
While at first continuing to use sterling after its independence (1922), the new Irish Free State (Irish: Saorstát Éireann) introduced its own currency from 1928. The new Free State pound was defined by the 1927 Act to have exactly the same weight and fineness of gold as did the sovereign at the time, having the effect of making the new currency pegged at 1:1 with sterling de facto rather than de jure. Parity with sterling was maintained for another fifty years. As with sterling, the £sd system was used, with the Irish names punt (plural: puint), scilling (plural: scillingí) and pingin (plural: pinginí). Distinctive coins and notes were introduced, the coins from 1928 (in eight denominations: 1/4d., 1/2d., 1d., 3d., 6d., shilling (1/–), florin (2/–), half crown (2/6) and in 1966 a 10/– coin) – all but the 3d. and 6d. had the same dimensions as their British counterparts, the Irish coins being thicker nickel coins in contrast to the thin 50% silver ones issued in the UK. However, sterling coins generally continued to be accepted on a one-for-one basis everywhere, whereas Irish coins were not generally accepted in the United Kingdom, except in parts of Northern Ireland.

=== Irish pound ===
The name of the state was officially changed to "Ireland" (Irish: Éire) on the coming into force of the Constitution of Ireland on 29 December 1937. On 10 May 1938, the name of the currency became the Irish pound.

=== Decimalisation ===
The Report of the Metric System and Decimal Coinage Committee (1959) was amongst the first formal reports on decimalisation of the currency, discussion continued into the 1960s on the topic. When the British government decided to decimalise its currency, the Irish government followed suit. The Decimal Currency Act 1969 replaced the traditional shilling and penny with a centesimal subdivision, the "new penny" (pingin nua; symbol: p). The pound itself was not revalued by this act and therefore banknotes were unaffected, although the 10/– note was replaced by a 50p coin due to spiralling inflation. The new 5p coin correlated with the shilling coin, and the new 10p coin correlated with the florin coin. New coins were issued of the same dimensions and materials as the corresponding new British coins. The Decimal Currency Act 1970 made additional provisions for the changeover not related with the issue of coins.

Decimalisation was overseen by the Irish Decimal Currency Board, created on 12 June 1968. It provided changeover information to the public, including a pamphlet called Everyone's Guide to Decimal Currency. The changeover occurred on Decimal Day, 15 February 1971.

=== Breaking the link with sterling ===
The European Monetary System was introduced in the 1970s. Ireland decided to join it in 1978, but the United Kingdom stayed out.

The European Exchange Rate Mechanism finally broke the one-for-one link that existed between the Irish pound and the pound sterling; by 30 March 1979 an exchange rate was introduced.

This period also saw the creation of the Currency Centre at Sandyford in 1978, where banknotes and coinage could be manufactured within the state. Before this, banknotes were printed by specialist commercial printers in England, and coins were struck by the British Royal Mint.

=== 1979–1999: Free-floating currency ===
Historical exchange rate of the Deutsche Mark to the Irish pound (1979–99), showing a steady decline in the punt's exchange rate over most of the period.

Until 1986, all decimal Irish coins were the same shape and size as their British counterparts. After this, however, all new denominations or redesigns of existing ones would not match corresponding UK coinage. The new 20p coin introduced that year and the £1 coin (introduced in 1990) were completely different in size, shape and composition from the previously introduced British versions. When the British 5p and 10p coins were reduced in size, the Irish followed suit, but the new Irish 10p was smaller than the new British version introduced in 1992 and the new Irish 5p, while identical in weight, was slightly larger than the British version introduced in 1990. The Irish 50p was never reduced in size (as the British one was in 1997). Although Britain issued a £2 coin in 1998 , there was no £2 coin in Ireland. Despite not being legal tender, sterling coins of the same shape and size were customarily accepted in Ireland. At time of the replacement with the euro, these were the 1p, 2p and 5p (although it was not exactly the same as the British 5p).

=== Replacement with the euro ===
On 31 December 1998, the exchange rates between the European Currency Unit and the Irish pound and 10 other EMS currencies (all but the pound sterling, the Swedish krona and the Danish krone) were fixed. The fixed conversion factor for the Irish pound was EUR 1.00 = IEP 0.787564. Of the 13 national currencies initially tied to the euro, (Note: Belgian franc, Deutsche Mark, French franc, Irish pound, Italian lira, Dutch guilder, Luxembourg franc, Spanish peseta, Modern drachma, Portuguese escudo as well as the currencies of the Vatican City, Monaco and San Marino) the Irish pound was the only one whose conversion factor was less than 1, i.e. the unit of the national currency was worth more than one euro – almost EUR 1.27 in this case.

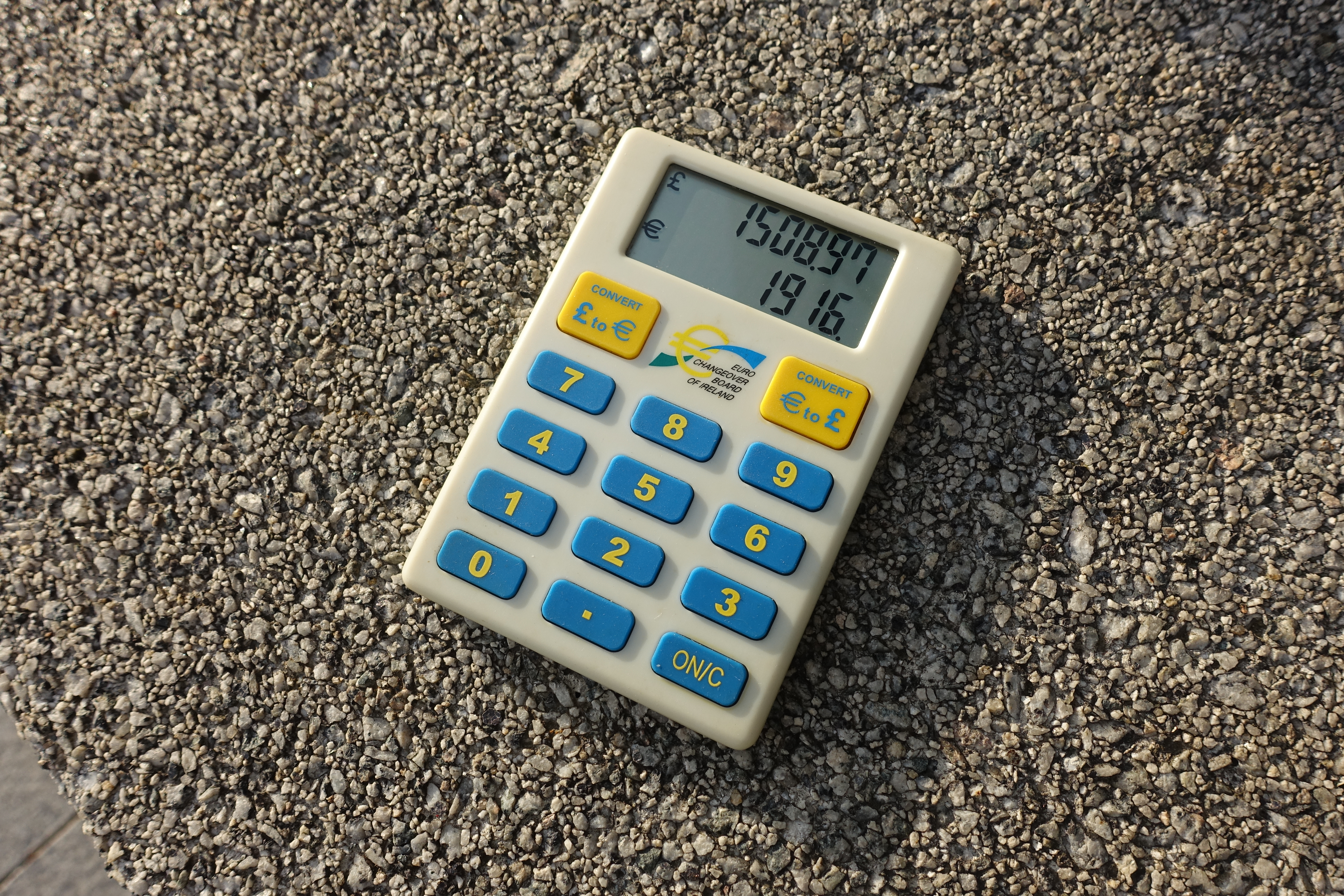
Euro Changeover Board of Ireland calculator

Although the euro became the currency of the eurozone countries including Ireland on 1 January 1999, it was not until 1 January 2002 that the state began to withdraw Irish pound coins and notes, replacing them with euro notes and coins. All other eurozone countries withdrew their currencies in a similar fashion, from that date. Irish pound coins and notes ceased to be legal tender on 9 February 2002. All Irish coins and banknotes, from the start of the Irish Free State onwards, both decimal and pre-decimal, may be redeemed for euros at Ireland's Central Bank in Dublin.

== See also ==
- Adoption of the euro in Ireland
- Banknotes of the Republic of Ireland
- Coins of the Republic of Ireland
- Commemorative coins of Ireland
- Irish euro coins
- Economy of the Republic of Ireland
