= Halfpenny (Irish pre-decimal coin) =

Denomination of the pre-decimal Irish pound

Halfpenny / Leathphingin
- Ireland
- Value: 1/2 penny
- Mass: 5.66 g
- Diameter: 25.5 mm
- Thickness: 1.77 mm
- Edge: Plain
- Composition: Bronze
- Years of minting: 1928–1969
- Catalog number: —

Obverse
- Design: Irish harp
- Design date: 1928

Reverse
- Design: Sow and litter
- Designer: Percy Metcalfe
- Design date: 1928

The halfpenny (1/2d) (Irish: leathphingin) coin was the second smallest denomination of the pre-decimal Irish pound, worth 1/480 of a pound or 1/24 of a shilling. First issued in 1928 it ceased to be legal tender on 1 August 1969.

The coin measured 1.005 inches (25.5 mm) in diameter and weighed 5.66990 grams. The bronze coin was made up of 95.5% copper, 3% tin and 1.5% zinc. This was identical to the British halfpenny as both countries' pounds were pegged until 1979.

The reverse design was by Percy Metcalfe, an English artist. The artist was given the choice of a boar, a sow or a ram, and the sow was chosen. The obverse featured the Irish harp. From 1928 to 1937 the date was split either side of the harp with the name Saorstát Éireann circling around. From 1938 to 1969 the inscription changed to Éire on the left of the harp and the date on the right.

It was commonly nicknamed a "make," a term derived from Scotland and northern England, originally from "Brummagem make," which referred to fake copper coins made in Birmingham. The phrase "I haven't a make," long survived the coin; similarly, The Saw Doctors used the line "I'm saving all my makes," in "Presentation Boarder." (1991)

== See also ==
- St Patrick halfpenny
- £sd
