= Banknotes of the Republic of Ireland =

The Irish Free State, subsequently known as Ireland, resolved in the mid-1920s to design its own coins and banknotes. Upon issuing the new currency, the Free State government pegged its value to the pound sterling. The Currency Act, 1927 was passed as a basis for creating banknotes and the "Saorstát pound" (later the "Irish pound") as the "standard unit of value." The legal tender notes issued under this act began circulating on 10 September 1928.

== Background ==
When the Irish Free State came into existence in 1922, three categories of banknote were in circulation. These consisted of notes issued by the Bank of England, the British Treasury, and six Irish banks that were chartered to issue notes. Only British Treasury notes were legal tender within the state. The issuing of banknotes by multiple private institutions was an everyday aspect of banking in Great Britain and Ireland at the time and remains so in Northern Ireland and Scotland.

A banking commission was created in 1926, the Commission of Inquiry into Banking and the Issue of Notes, to determine what changes were necessary relating to banking and banknote issue in the new state. The commission was chaired by Professor Henry Parker Willis of Columbia University who was Director of Research of the Federal Reserve Board in the United States. The commission's terms of reference were:

"To consider and to report to the Minister for Finance what changes, if any, in the law relative to banking and note issue are necessary or desirable, regard being had to the altered circumstances arising from the establishment of Saorstát Éireann."

The commission's report of January 1927 recommended creating a currency for the state that would be directly backed and fixed to the pound sterling in the United Kingdom on a one-for-one basis. This new currency, the "Saorstát pound," was overseen by the politically independent Currency Commission created by the Currency Act, 1927. Because the notes of the commission were backed by the pound sterling, they could be presented at the London Agency of the Currency Commission and exchanged with the pound sterling, without charge or commission, on a one-for-one basis.

A second banking commission, the Commission of Inquiry into Banking, Currency and Credit, was created in November 1934 to inquire into creating a central bank. The majority report of August 1938 recommended creating a central bank with enhanced powers and functions. This resulted in the creation of the Central Bank of Ireland, but it would take three decades before the bank would have all the rights and functions associated with a central bank.

As per the usual convention for banknote issue, banknotes are and were issued in the name of the Currency Commission or Central Bank existing at printing.

== The pound ==
Before the advent of the euro, three series of legal tender notes were issued; these are referred to as "Series A," "Series B," and "Series C," respectively. A series of notes known as the "Consolidated Banknotes" were issued but were not legal tender.

=== 1928–1977: Series A banknotes ===
The Currency Commission devised the "Series A" notes. They were printed by Waterlow and Sons, Limited, London which was acquired by De La Rue. The commission created an advisory committee that determined the theme and design of the notes. Notes were in the denominations of 10/-, £1, £5, £10, £20, £50, and £100. Each note has a portrait of Lady Lavery, the wife of the artist Sir John Lavery, who was commissioned to design this feature. The original oil on canvas painting of Lady Lavery, titled Portrait of Lady Lavery as Kathleen Ni Houlihan (1927), is displayed at the National Gallery of Ireland on loan from the Central Bank of Ireland.

The theme on the reverse of the notes is the rivers of Ireland, which are depicted as heads taken from the Custom House, Dublin. Rivers in both the Irish Free State and Northern Ireland were chosen. Each note also contains a watermark of the Head of Erin.

=== 1929–1953: Consolidated banknotes ===
This series of banknotes were never legal tender. They were equivalent to "promissory notes" that continue to be issued by some banks in the United Kingdom. Notes were issued as a transitional measure for the eight "Shareholding Banks" of the Currency Commission: Bank of Ireland, Hibernian Bank, Munster & Leinster Bank, National Bank, Northern Bank, Provincial Bank of Ireland, Royal Bank of Ireland, and Ulster Bank. These notes were first issued between 6 May and 10 June 1929 under the arrangement that the banks withdraw previous notes and refrain from issuing further notes. The consolidated notes were only issued by the Currency Commission. The last notes were printed in 1941. The notes were officially withdrawn on 31 December 1953.

The front of each note depicted a man ploughing a field with two horses. They are referred to as the "Ploughman Notes." The notes' denominations and the back designs were; £1 (Custom House, Dublin), £5 (St. Patrick's Bridge, Cork), £10 (Currency Commission Building, Foster Place, Dublin), £20 (Rock of Cashel, County Tipperary), £50 (Croagh Patrick, County Mayo), and £100 (Killiney Bay, County Dublin). The name of the issuing Shareholding Bank also varied, along with the corresponding authorising signature.

=== 1976–1993: Series B banknotes ===
The Central Bank of Ireland commissioned the "Series B" notes. They were designed and brought into circulation between 1976 and 1982. Servicon, an Irish design company, designed the £1, £5, £10, £20, £50, and £100 denominations. The £100 note was never issued or circulated. This is the only series of Irish banknotes without a note of this denomination.

The theme of these notes was the history of Ireland. Each note featured the portrait of a historical figure. The Lady Lavery portrait, from Series A, was retained as a watermark.

=== 1992–2001: Series C banknotes ===
This series of notes, called "Series C", was the outcome of a limited competition, held in 1991, to which nine Irish artists were invited. The winner and designer of the series was Robert Ballagh. The notes were in denominations of £5, £10, £20, £50 and £100. No Irish pound note was designed because the currency had had a coin of this value since 1990. This series was introduced at short notice, with the £20 note being the first to be issued, following widespread forgery of the Series B £20 note. The last banknote of the Series C issue was a £50 note that was issued in 2001.

The theme for this series was people who had contributed to the formation of modern Ireland. It included politicians, a literary figure, and a religious figure. To avoid potential factional and sectarian issues with the notes, only uncontroversial political figures were chosen.

== The euro ==
=== Transition ===
The euro became the currency of the eurozone countries, including Ireland, on 1 January 1999. As with all Eurozone countries, Ireland continued to mint its own banknotes after the currency changeover to the Euro. Previously issued Irish banknotes circulated concurrently with the newer Irish-minted euro denominated banknotes. On 1 January 2002, the Eurozone countries, including Ireland, began to withdraw banknotes and coins denominated based on their earlier currencies, including the Irish pound, replacing them with Euro specie. Irish pound banknotes ceased to be legal tender on 9 February 2002, although they are intended to be exchangeable indefinitely for Euro at the Central Bank.

On 31 December 2001, the total value of Irish banknotes in circulation was €4,343.8 million. The Irish cash changeover was one of the fastest in the Eurozone, with some shops ceasing to accept pounds after the first week or two, well ahead of the banknotes ceasing to be legal tender. With a conversion factor of 0.787564 Irish pounds to the Euro, of the 15 national currencies originally tied to the Euro (also including the currencies of Vatican City, Monaco and San Marino), the Irish pound was the only one whose conversion factor was less than 1, i.e. the unit of the national currency was worth more than one Euro. 56%, by value, of Irish banknotes were withdrawn from circulation within two weeks of the introduction of Euro and 83.4% by the time they ceased to have legal tender status.

=== Generally ===
The Central Bank of Ireland, as an agency of the European Central Bank, produces euro banknotes at its Currency Centre in Sandyford Industrial Estate, Dublin.

Central banks in the Eurozone provide banknotes of one denomination each year, according to demand and a rotating allocation (determined by the ECB). Before the introduction of the Euro in 2002, national banks produced several lower denominations to build stockpiles. Since 2002, however, the Central Bank of Ireland has only printed €10 notes. Although notes produced in other Eurozone states circulate alongside domestically produced notes, the country of origin for any euro banknote can be identified by a one-letter prefix to the serial number. Banknotes issued in Ireland use the prefix "T."

Printing banknotes is not necessarily undertaken in the country in which banknotes are given a serial number and released. The Central Bank of Ireland is the sole Irish printer of Euro banknotes. (In some other Eurozone countries, notes are printed by a private company commissioned by the central bank, rather than by the central bank itself.) Any notes printed by the Central Bank of Ireland have the prefix "K" before the series code in a small star on the front of the banknote. The decision to continue printing a comparatively small number of Euro notes in Dublin, when those notes could be printed much more cheaply on existing presses elsewhere, benefiting from economies of scale, has been described as a "colossal waste of money".

The Central Bank of Ireland does not currently introduce €200 and €500 notes into circulation, although they are legal tender. If spent (by people from other Eurozone member states), they are unlikely to be passed to other consumers and will find their way back to the banks (which only dispense notes up to €100).
