= Twopence (disambiguation) =

The British twopence (2d) piece is a discontinued denomination of sterling coinage.

The modern British two-pence (2p) piece is a denomination of sterling coinage.

Twopence or tuppence may also refer to:

== Currency ==
- Two pence (or pennies) in British coinage
  - Two pence (British decimal coin)
  - Twopence (British pre-decimal coin), in use until 1971
- Two pence (Irish coin), in use 1971–2002

== Other uses ==
- Tuppence (detective), a recurring character in the works of Agatha Christie
- Tuppence Middleton (born 1987), English actress
- Desmond Moran (died 2009), nicknamed 'Tuppence', Australian criminal
- "My two cents", or "my tuppence", an idiomatic expression
- "Feed the Birds (Tuppence a Bag)", a song featured in the 1964 motion picture Mary Poppins

== See also ==
- Thruppence
