= Five pence =

Five pence may refer to:

- Five pence (British coin), a decimal subdivision of the pound sterling
- Five pence (Irish coin), a decimal subdivision of the now withdrawn Irish pound
