= Currency Centre =

Government mint of Ireland

Coordinates: 53.2736°N 6.2317°W

- Industry: Metalworking
- Founded: 1978; 48 years ago
- Headquarters: Dublin, Ireland
- Area served: Ireland
- Products: coins

The Currency Centre (Irish: An tIonad Airgeadra; also known as the Irish Mint) is the coin mint and banknote printer for the Central Bank of Ireland, including the euro currency. The centre is located in Sandyford, Dublin, Ireland. The centre does not print the complete range of euro banknotes; other denominations are imported.

The centre was designed by architect Sam Stephenson, for which he won the RIAI Triennial Gold Medal in 1977-1979. Construction began in 1972, with the first notes being printed in 1974. In 1976, the Currency Centre printed the first notes of Series B along with the first mint of Irish coins. Before the centre was established, Irish coins were produced in the Royal Mint.

The first euro coins were minted in the centre in September 1999, whilst the first banknotes were printed in April 2000; these commenced delivery to banks and retailers in September (coins) and October (banknotes) of 2001. The final Irish coins, based on the Irish pound, were minted in September 2000 and the final banknotes were printed in April 2001.

The decision to continue printing euro notes in Dublin when those notes could be printed much more cheaply on existing presses elsewhere was described as a colossal waste of money in April 2012.
