= Sitric =

Sitric may refer to:

- Sigtrygg, an Old Norse given name, or Sitric in Norse-Gaelic Ireland (9th to 11th centuries)
- Sitric Cáech (died 927), a Viking leader and ruler
- Sitric II of Northumbria (fl. c. 942), a Viking leader

== See also ==
- Sitrick and Company
- Citric acid
