= Gun money =

Short lived currency in Ireland in the 17th century

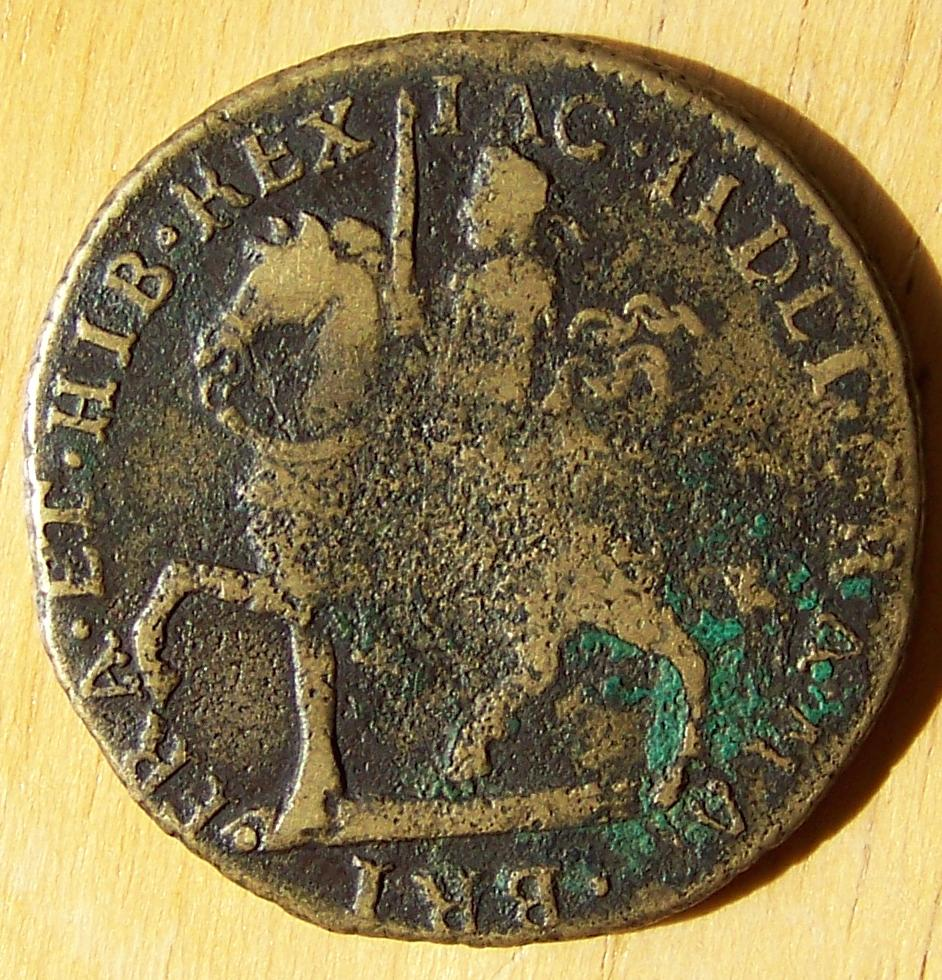
A gun money crown, featuring an equestrian portrait of James II. Unlike the other coins in this series, the crown did not bear the month of issue.

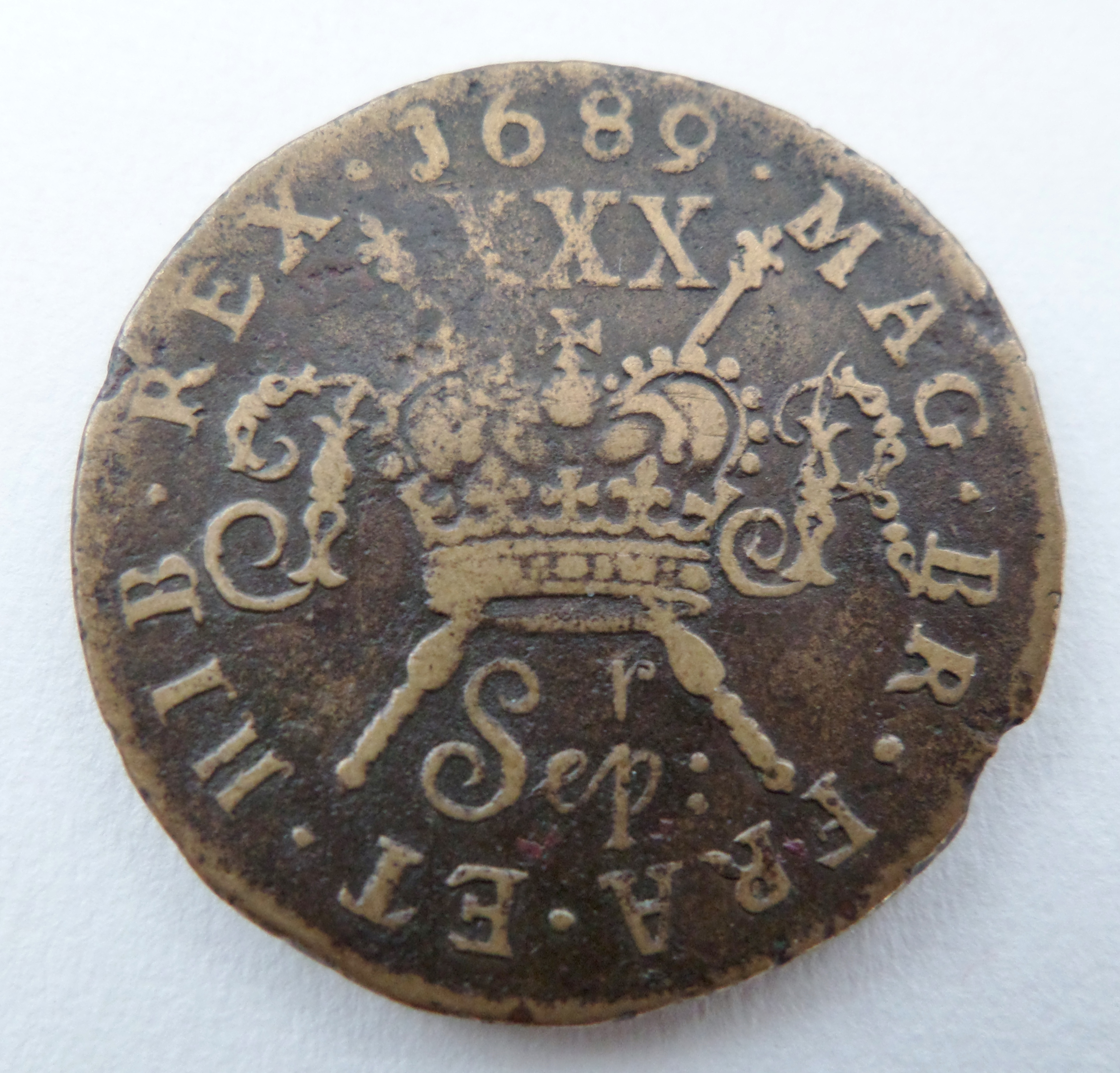
Half-crown (Two shillings Six pence or 30-pence) coin, dated September 1689.

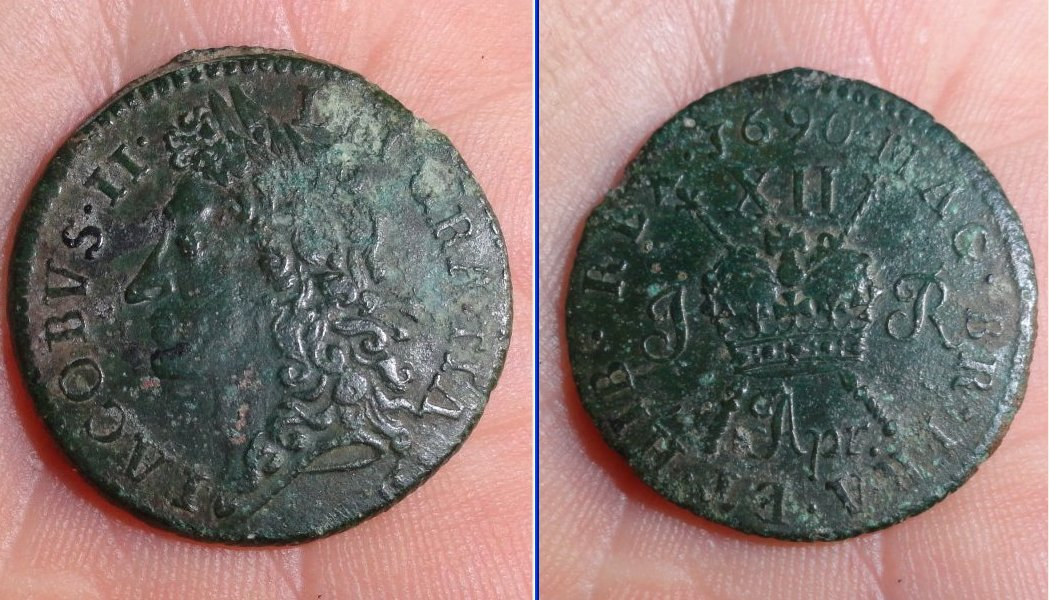
A gun money Shilling, with a portrait of James II dated April 1690.

Gun money (Irish: airgead gunna) was an issue of coins made by the forces of James II during the Williamite War in Ireland between 1689 and 1691. They were minted in base metal (copper, brass or pewter), and were designed to be redeemed for silver coins following a victory by James II and consequently bore the date in months to allow a gradual replacement. As James lost the war, that replacement never took place, although the coins were allowed to circulate at much reduced values before the copper coinage was resumed. They were mostly withdrawn from circulation in the early 18th century.

The name "gun money" stems from the idea that they were minted from melted down guns. However, many other brass objects, such as church bells, were also used.

There were two issues. The first "large" issue consisted of sixpences, shillings and half crowns (2½ shillings). The second, "small" issue consisted of shillings, halfcrowns and crowns (5 shillings). Some of the second issue were overstruck on large issue pieces, with shillings struck over sixpences, half crowns on shillings and crowns on half crowns. The most notable feature of the coins is the date, because the month of striking was also included. This was so that after the war (in the event of James' victory), soldiers would be able to claim interest on their wages, which had been withheld from proper payment for so long.

Specimen strikings were produced in silver and gold for most months, and these tend to be extremely rare.

== Pewter money ==
Pewter money is a rarer type of gun money, manufactured out of pewter, an alloy containing mostly tin, and smaller amounts of copper, antimony, bismuth and lead. Some of the coins had also a brass plug. Halfcrowns and Crowns were issued in 1690 with the same dies as other gun money coins. Both these coins are extremely rare, along with a Groat struck in 1689 which is probably a pattern. Halfpennies and Pennies were also produced in 1689 and 1690, and less rare, although the 1689 penny is virtually unknown.

== See also ==
- Notgeld
