= One pound (Irish coin) =

Denomination of the Irish pound

Pound / Punt
- Ireland
- Value: 1 pound
- Mass: 10 g
- Diameter: 31.11 mm
- Thickness: 1.90 mm
- Edge: Milled
- Composition: Cupronickel
- Years of minting: 1990–2000
- Catalog number: —

Obverse
- Design: Irish harp
- Design date: 1971 (first use 1928)

Reverse
- Design: Red deer
- Designer: Tom Ryan
- Design date: 1990

The one pound (£1) (Irish: punt) coin, worth one Irish pound, was used in Ireland from 20 June 1990 until the formal adoption of euro currency in 2002. The last issue was minted in 2000.

The coin was the largest Irish coin since decimalisation: its diameter was 3.11 centimetres (1.22 in) and it weighed 10 grams (0.35 oz). The coin was almost identical in dimensions to the old penny coin that circulated until 1971, and was similar in diameter to, but thinner than, the half-crown coin. The edge was milled, and a dotted line ran along the edge of each face. Unlike many previous Irish coins, it was very different in design and composition from its British equivalent, as the Irish pound separated from the British pound in 1979.

The design on the reverse was of a red deer, by Irish artist Tom Ryan, based on photographs taken by Sean Ryan of that species from the Irish national deer herd in Killarney National Park.

Broighter Boat

On 29 November 1999 a £1 coin was issued to commemorate the new millennium. The design on the reverse was based on the "Broighter Boat" in the National Museum of Ireland. Alan Ardiff and Garrett Stokes designed the coin.

During the early circulation of the coin, many payphones and vending machines which had been changed to accept the £1 coin also accepted the old penny, which was no longer legal tender and of little value to collectors. As a result, vending machine operators lost money, and they incurred further costs to alter the machines so as not to accept the pennies. Further, coins dated 1999 (produced by the Royal Mint of the United Kingdom and not the Central Bank of Ireland) were rejected by many vending machines (including parking meters in Dublin) as they were lighter than the standard coins, having been produced from a different alloy.
