= Penny (Irish decimal coin) =

Denomination of the Irish pound

Penny / Pingin
- Ireland
- Value: 1 penny
- Mass: 3.56 g
- Diameter: 20.32 mm
- Thickness: (Bronze) 1.52 mm (Steel) 1.65 mm
- Edge: Plain
- Composition: Bronze (1971–1988); Copper-plated steel (1988–2000)
- Years of minting: 1971–2000
- Catalog number: KM# 20 (1971–1988)

Obverse
- Design: Irish harp
- Design date: 1971 (first use 1928)

Reverse
- Design: Ornamental bird
- Designer: Gabriel Hayes
- Design date: 1971

The decimal one penny (1p) (Irish: pingin) coin was the second-smallest denomination of the Irish pound. There were 100 pennies (pence) to the pound. The coin was first issued on Decimal Day, 15 February 1971. It was the second of three new designs introduced all in bronze, the others being a half-penny and a two pence coin. All featured ornamental birds designed by Irish artist Gabriel Hayes on the reverse.

The coin originally had a diameter of 2.032 centimetres and mass of 3.564 grams consisting of copper, tin and zinc. This was identical to the British decimal penny as the two countries' pounds were pegged until 1979.

The coin's official designation was "new penny" and this was changed in 1985 to "penny". In 1988 the decision was taken to produce the coin on a copper-plated steel base as bronze had become too expensive. The copper plated steel coins are magnetic.

The coin was designed by the Irish artist Gabriel Hayes and the design is adapted from the Book of Kells held in Trinity College, Dublin.

In 1990 it was announced that the penny would be redesigned to incorporate the wolfhound design from the pre-decimal sixpence, but this plan was abandoned in the face of the imminent adoption of the euro. The penny was withdrawn with the introduction of euro coins on 1 January 2002.
