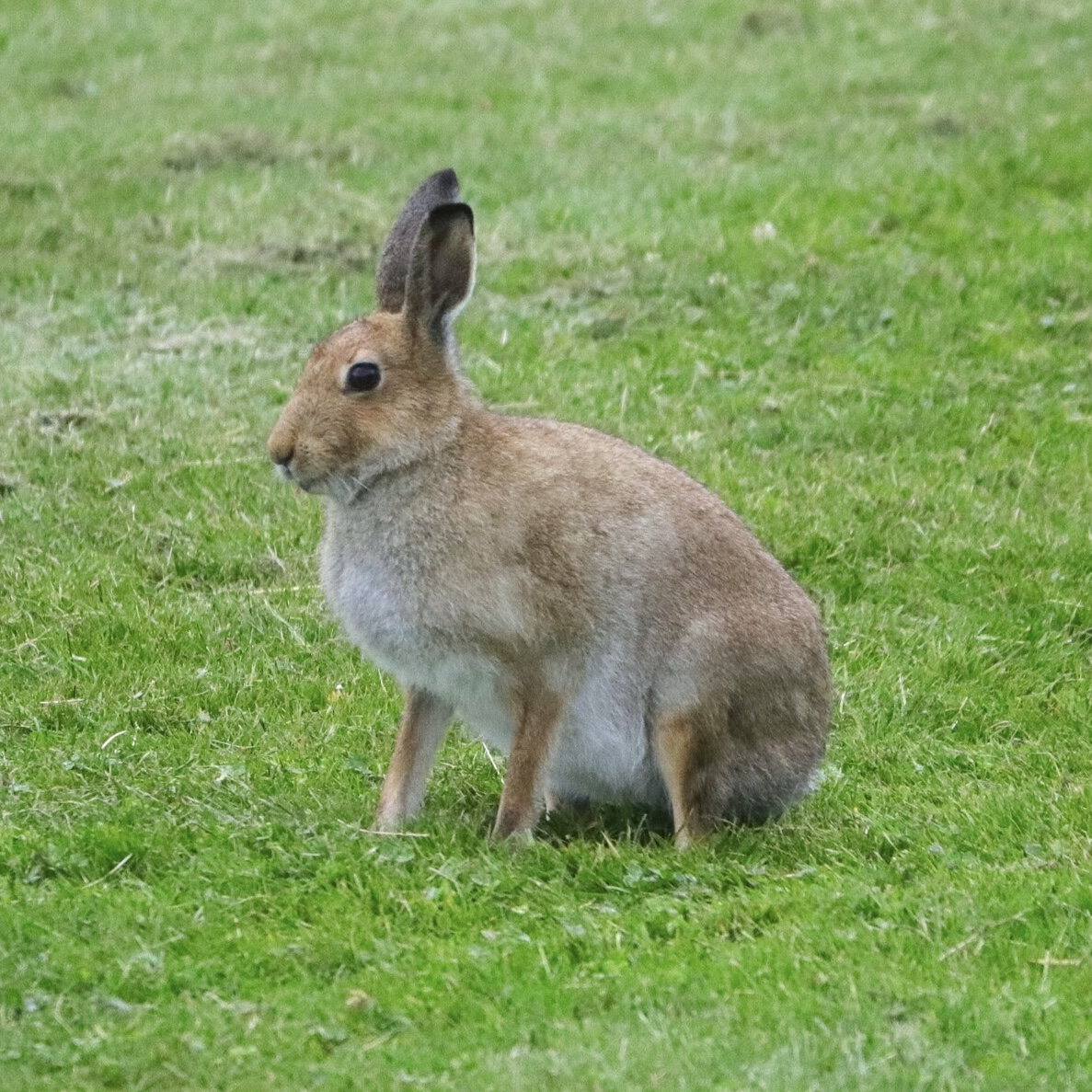

Scientific classification
- Kingdom: Animalia
- Phylum: Chordata
- Class: Mammalia
- Order: Lagomorpha
- Family: Leporidae
- Genus: Lepus
- Species: L. timidus
- Subspecies: L. t. hibernicus

Trinomial name
- Lepus timidus hibernicus Bell, 1837

= Lepus timidus hibernicus =

Subspecies of mammal

Lepus timidus hibernicus, more commonly known as the Irish hare, is a subspecies of the mountain hare (Lepus timidus) that is native to the island of Ireland. It is the only species of hare endemic to Ireland, and is known for its distinctive appearance and behaviour.

== Description and habitat ==
The Irish hare is similar in appearance to other mountain hare subspecies but tends to have a slightly darker coat, especially during the winter months. It has long hind legs, large ears, and a white underside. The coat coloration can vary from brown to grey, with white fur on the belly.

They are typically found in upland and lowland habitats across Ireland, including grasslands, heathlands, and agricultural areas. They prefer open areas with plenty of vegetation for cover and food.

They are listed as a protected species under the Games Acts and Schedule 6 of the Wildlife (Northern Ireland) Order 1985. It is also listed on Appendix III of the Berne Convention (Anon, 1979) and Annex V(a) of the EC Habitats Directive (92/43/EEC).

== Threats ==
Agricultural intensification, illegal poaching, and introduced diseases currently represent the most significant threats to the hares. Their numbers have been in decline since the early 20th century, coinciding with changes in land management practices, but may have stabilised at relatively low levels since the 21st century.

The Irish Hare faces competition for resources from the invasive European Brown Hare, whose range is likely to further expand in response to future climate change. Hybridisation with this species is also a threat, as are introduced diseases to which the Irish Hare is naïve, particularly RHDV2.
