= Ten pence (Irish coin) =

Denomination of the Irish pound

Ten pence / Deich pingin
- Ireland
- Value: 10 pence
- Mass: 11.31 g / 5.45 g
- Diameter: 28.5 mm (1969–1993) / (1993–2000) 22.0 mm
- Edge: Coarse mill
- Composition: Cupronickel
- Years of minting: 1969–2000
- Catalog number: —

Obverse
- Design: Irish harp
- Design date: 1969 (first use 1928)

Reverse
- Design: Salmon
- Designer: Percy Metcalfe
- Design date: 1969 (first use 1928)

The ten pence (10p) (Irish: deich pingin) coin was a subdivision of the Irish pound. It was used in the Republic of Ireland from 1969 to 2002, with its last minting issue in 2000. It replaced the florin coin, of which it shared its design. Two different designs of the coin exist, both featuring a salmon on the reverse. The second was introduced in 1993 and is smaller, due to the reduction of the coin's value by inflation.

It was introduced two years prior to Decimal Day, 15 February 1971, due to its value at a tenth of a pound being the same as the previous florin. It retained the exact design and dimensions (except denomination) of the florin coin, introduced to the Irish Free State in 1928. Some florin coins remained in circulation until 1994, when it was decided to reduce the size of the ten pence coin.

The original ten pence weighed 11.31036 grams (0.398961 oz) and had a diameter of 2.85 centimetres (1.12 in). Its size became a problem after inflation reduced the coin's value, and it was last minted in 1986.

In 1993 a replacement was struck at 2.2 centimetres (0.87 in) diameter and 5.45 grams (0.192 oz). This new coin featured a salmon, but moved the location of the denomination as a result of reversing the picture of the salmon. The composition of the ten pence was 75% copper and 25% nickel.

The coin was worth 1/10 of an Irish pound. All of the original ten pence coins were withdrawn on 1 June 1994. The smaller version was withdrawn when the euro currency was introduced in 2002.
