= Two pence (Irish coin) =

Denomination of the Irish pound

Two pence / Dhá phingin
- Ireland
- Value: 2 pence
- Mass: 7.12 g
- Diameter: 25.91 mm
- Thickness: (Bronze) 1.85 mm (Steel) 2.03 mm
- Edge: Plain
- Composition: Bronze (1971–1988); Copper-plated steel (1988–2000)
- Years of minting: 1971–2000
- Catalog number: —

Obverse
- Design: Irish harp
- Design date: 1971 (first use 1928)

Reverse
- Design: Ornamental bird
- Designer: Gabriel Hayes
- Design date: 1971

The two pence (2p) (Irish: dhá phingin) coin was the third smallest denomination of the Irish pound, being worth 1/50 of a pound. It was first issued on Decimal Day, 15 February 1971. The coin was struck until 2000. It was the third of three new designs introduced all in bronze, the others being the halfpenny and penny. All featured ornamental birds on the reverse.

The coin was designed by the Irish artist Gabriel Hayes and the design is adapted from the Second Bible of Charles the Bald held at Bibliothèque Nationale in Paris. The coin originally had a diameter of 2.591 centimetres and weight of 7.128 grams consisting of copper, tin and zinc.

In 1988, it was announced that the two-pence coin would be redesigned to incorporate the hare from the pre-decimal threepence, but this plan was abandoned in the face of the imminent adoption of the euro. In 1988, the decision was taken to produce the coin on a copper plated steel planchet as bronze had become too expensive. The copper plated steel coins are magnetic. After reducing the size of the five and ten pence coins introduced in the early 1990s, the two pence coin was the fourth largest Irish coin, with only the twenty and fifty pence and the pound coin coins being larger in the series.

The two-pence coin was withdrawn when euro coins were introduced on 1 January 2002.
