= Ten shilling coin =

1966 Irish commemorative coin

Ten Shillings
- Ireland
- Value: 1/2 Irish pound
- Mass: 18.14 g
- Diameter: 30.0 mm
- Edge: Plain with inscription
- Composition: silver, copper
- Years of minting: 1966
- Catalog number: KM #18

Obverse
- Design: Bust of Patrick Pearse
- Design date: 1966

Reverse
- Design: Cú Chulainn
- Designer: Thomas Humphrey Paget
- Design date: 1966

The ten shilling (10s.; Irish: deich scilling) coin was a one-off commemorative coin issued in Ireland in 1966 to mark the 50th anniversary of the Easter Rising. Ten shillings was a subdivision of the pre-decimal Irish pound, worth 1/2 of an Irish pound, making this the highest-value coin in the pre-decimal system.

The coin was 83 1/3% silver and 16 2/3% copper. It measured 1.2 inches (30 mm) in diameter and weighed 18.144 grams, therefore containing 0.4861 troy ounces (15.12 g) of silver. The coin did not prove popular, and 1,270,000 of the two million produced were withdrawn and melted down. This unpopularity may be due to the ten-shilling note which was still in circulation — the government were eager to replace the 10s. note with a coin, because ten-shilling notes were heavily used and had to be replaced after about five months, whereas a coin could last for decades. Twenty thousand coins were issued as proofs in green boxes.

The reverse design featured the heroic death of Cú Chulainn, a mythical Irish hero, who is seen tied to a stone and with a raven on his shoulder. The figure of Cú Chulainn is a miniature of the statue by Oliver Sheppard, in the General Post Office, Dublin. The coin was produced for the 50th anniversary of the Easter Rising and commenced circulation on 12 April 1966 and was designed by Thomas Humphrey Paget.

The ten shilling is the only Irish coin to feature an inscription on edge until the Irish euro coins, this is Éirí Amaċ na Cásca 1916, which translates as "1916 Easter Rising"; the inscription was in Gaelic type on a plain edge. Approximately half of the inscriptions were inverted, making them no scarcer than the upright type. The coin is also unique in being the only modern circulated Irish coin (before the introduction of Euro) not to feature the harp on the obverse side, instead featuring the portrait of Patrick Pearse the revolutionary, further making it unique among Irish coinage in that it is the sole coin to feature the image of anyone associated with Irish history or politics, apart from monarchs or Saint Patrick. This coin is the first Irish commemorative coin issued by the Irish state, first Irish modern coin to feature a person, and the first official coin to commemorate the 1916 Easter Rising. Also interesting, the thickness of this coin is uneven, the edge of the coin being thicker than the centre. The coin is about 3.21 mm (0.126 in) thick, similar to the old British pound coin.

Brendan Corish requested that the names of all seven signatories appear on the coin, but this was "not feasible".

This coin was officially removed from circulation from 10 February 2002, at the time of the conversion to the euro. While it had not been in general circulation in any quantities since 1966, the coin would have survived Decimal Day, being fifty new pence in value.

== See also ==
- £sd
