= Half crown (Irish coin) =

Pre-decimalisation coin of Ireland

Half crown / Leath Choróin
- Ireland
- Value: 30 pence
- Mass: 14.1 g
- Diameter: 32.4 mm
- Thickness: 2.3 mm
- Edge: Milled
- Composition: Silver (1928–1943); Cupronickel (1943–1967)
- Years of minting: 1928–1967
- Catalog number: —

Obverse
- Design: Irish harp
- Design date: 1928

Reverse
- Design: Irish Hunter
- Designer: Percy Metcalfe
- Design date: 1928

The half crown (2s 6d) (Irish: leath choróin) coin was a subdivision of the pre-decimal Irish pound, worth 1/8 of a pound. The half crown was commonly called "two and six" due to its value of two shillings and sixpence (indicated on the coin itself as "2s 6d").

The original minting of the coin from 1928 to 1943 contained 75% silver, a higher content than the equivalent British coin. The silver coins were quite distinguishable as they had a whiter appearance than the later cupronickel variety minted from 1951. The silver coins wore less well. The subsequent cupronickel coin was 75% copper and 25% nickel.

The coin measured 1.275 inches (32.4 mm) in diameter and weighed 14.1 grams. The reverse design of the coin, by Percy Metcalfe featured an Irish Hunter, a breed of horse. This design was used later for the twenty pence coin issued in 1986. The obverse featured the Irish harp. From 1928 to 1937 the date was split either side of the harp with the name Saorstát Éireann circling around. From 1938 to 1967 the inscription changed to Éire on the left of the harp and the date on the right.

The last half crowns were produced in 1967 and the coin was withdrawn from circulation on 1 January 1970. The horse design was reused on the decimal 20p coin introduced in 1986.

== See also ==
- £sd
