= Five pence (Irish coin) =

Denomination of the Irish pound

Five pence / Cúig phingin
- Ireland
- Value: 5 pence
- Mass: 5.65 g / 3.25 g
- Diameter: 23.59 mm (1971–1993) / (1993–2000) 18.5 mm
- Edge: Fine mill
- Composition: Cupronickel
- Years of minting: 1971–2000
- Catalog number: —

Obverse
- Design: Irish harp
- Design date: 1971 (first use 1928)

Reverse
- Design: Bull
- Designer: Percy Metcalfe
- Design date: 1971 (first use 1928)

The five pence (5p) (Irish: cúig phingin) coin was a subdivision of the Irish pound. It was introduced in Ireland on Decimal Day, 15 February 1971 and reused the design on the shilling coin produced for the Irish Free State in 1928. Some shilling coins remained in circulation until the early 1990s, with the same nominal value as the five pence coin.

The five pence, introduced in 1971, was 5.65518 grams in weight with a diameter of 2.3595 centimetres. This matched the British five pence coin. As a modern coin it became apparent in the late 1980s that the coin's physical dimensions were large relative to its value.

The original five pence was last minted in 1990 and in 1992 a replacement was 3.25 grams in weight with a 1.85 centimetres diameter (differing from the corresponding new British five pence coin). This new coin kept the old design but incorporated some changes, notably the location of the figure and reversing the main design of the bull. The composition of the five pence was 75% copper and 25% nickel.

The coin was worth 1/20 of an Irish pound and was finally withdrawn on the advent of the euro in 2002.

== See also ==
- Shilling
