= Threepence (Irish coin) =

Denomination of the pre-decimal Irish pound

Threepence / leath reul
- Ireland
- Value: 3 pence
- Mass: 3.23 g
- Diameter: 17.7 mm
- Thickness: 1.9 mm
- Edge: Plain
- Composition: Nickel (1928–1942); Cupronickel (1942–1969)
- Years of minting: 1928–1969
- Catalog number: —

Obverse
- Design: Irish harp
- Design date: 1928

Reverse
- Design: Irish hare
- Designer: Percy Metcalfe
- Design date: 1928

The threepence (Irish: leath reul [ˌl̠ʲah ˈɾˠeːlˠ]) or 3d coin was a subdivision of the pre-decimal Irish pound, worth 1/80 of a pound or 1/4 of a shilling. Leath reul literally means "half reul", the reul being a sixpence coin worth about the same as the Spanish real (a quarter of a peseta). Unlike other Irish coins it did not resemble its British counterpart.

Originally it was struck in nickel and was very hard-wearing. In 1942, as nickel became more costly, the metal was changed to cupronickel of 75% copper and 25% nickel. The coin measured 17.6 millimetres (0.69 in) in diameter and weighed 3.2400 grams (0.11429 oz); this did not change with the cupro-nickel coin. The coin was minted at the Royal Mint starting from 1928, and ceased to be legal tender after decimalisation on 31 December 1971. Ireland did not adopt the brass dodecagonal threepenny coin that the United Kingdom used between 1937 and 1971.

The reverse design featuring an Irish hare was by English artist Percy Metcalfe. The obverse featured the Irish harp. From 1928 to 1937 the date was split either side of the harp with the name Saorstát Éireann circling around. From 1938 to 1969 the inscription changed to Éire on the left of the harp and the date on the right. In 1990 it was announced that the decimal two-pence coin would be redesigned to incorporate the hare from the threepence, but this plan was abandoned in the face of the imminent adoption of the euro.

== See also ==
- £sd
