= Twenty pence (Irish coin) =

Irish coin

Twenty pence / Fiche pingin
- Ireland
- Value: 20 pence
- Mass: 8.47 g
- Diameter: 27.1 mm
- Edge: Alternate smooth and milled
- Composition: Copper, Zinc, Nickel
- Years of minting: 1986–2000
- Catalog number: —

Obverse
- Design: Irish harp
- Design date: 1986 (first use 1928)

Reverse
- Design: Irish Hunter
- Designer: Percy Metcalfe
- Design date: 1986 (first use 1928)

The twenty pence (20p) (Irish: fiche pingin) coin was a subdivision of the Irish pound. It was introduced on 30 October 1986. It was the first Irish decimal coin of a different size to the corresponding British coin, as the Irish pound had not been pegged to sterling since 1979. Its last issue was in 2000, two years before Ireland withdrew its pound for the euro.

It features the horse (an Irish Hunter) that was on the pre-decimal half-crown coin, that was produced from 1928 to 1967.

The coin has a yellow-brass colour due to its composition which is 79% copper, 20% zinc and 1% nickel, it was determined that this composition would reduce production costs by 25% as against cupronickel then used. The edge of the coin has six bands, alternately finished smooth and grained. The mass of the coin is 8.47 grams, whilst the diameter is 2.71 centimetres.

The coin was designed to relieve the expense of creating the lower denominations and to assist the public and traders alike by creating a higher value coin which could assist in the removal of some five- and ten-pence coins. In 1982 the Minister for Finance, Ray MacSharry, announced that an intermediate denomination between the ten- and fifty-pence coins would be introduced. In August 1984 the twenty-pence denomination was chosen over a twenty-five-pence one; the Arts Council of Ireland recommended the horse design.

The coin was worth 1/5 of an Irish pound and was withdrawn with the advent of the euro in 2002.
