= Penny (Irish pre-decimal coin) =

Denomination of the pre-decimal Irish pound

Penny / Pingin
- Ireland
- Value: 1d Irish pound
- Mass: 9.45 g
- Diameter: 30.9 mm
- Thickness: 1.90 mm
- Edge: Plain
- Composition: Bronze
- Years of minting: 1928–1968
- Catalog number: —

Obverse
- Design: Irish harp
- Design date: 1928

Reverse
- Design: Hen and chicks
- Designer: Percy Metcalfe
- Design date: 1928

The penny (1d) (Irish: pingin) coin was the third-smallest denomination of the pre-decimal Irish pound, worth 1/240 of a pound or 1/12 of a shilling. To express an amount, penny was abbreviated to d, e.g. 1d, from the Roman denarius. It was introduced in 1928 to replace its British counterpart, used when all of Ireland was a constituent country of the United Kingdom. The last year of minting was 1968 and it ceased to be legal tender on 31 December 1971.

The coin measured 1.215 inches (30.9 mm) in diameter and weighed 9.45 grams. The bronze coin was made up of 95.5% copper, 3% tin and 1.5% zinc. Its dimensions were the same as that of the British penny as both currencies were pegged until 1979.

The reverse of the penny was designed by the English artist Percy Metcalfe. It featured a hen and five chicks and the coin's Irish name. The obverse featured the Irish harp. From 1928 to 1937 the date was split either side of the harp with the name Saorstát Éireann circling around. From 1938 to 1968 the inscription changed to Éire on the left of the harp and the date on the right.

== See also ==
- £sd
