= Florin (Irish coin) =

Irish Two-Shilling Coin

Florin / Flóirín
- Ireland
- Value: 24 pence
- Mass: 11.3 g
- Diameter: 28.6 mm
- Thickness: 2.3 mm
- Edge: Milled
- Composition: Silver (1928–1943); Cupronickel (1943–1969)
- Years of minting: 1928–1968
- Catalog number: —

Obverse
- Design: Irish harp
- Design date: 1928

Reverse
- Design: Salmon
- Designer: Percy Metcalfe
- Design date: 1928

The florin (2s) (Irish: flóirín) coin was a subdivision of the pre-decimal Irish pound, worth 1/10 of a pound. It was more commonly known as the two-shilling coin.

The original minting of the coin from 1928 until 1943 contained 75% silver, a higher content than the equivalent British coin. It is believed that this was done so that the new currency would not be seen as a poor substitute to the British currency which circulated alongside. The silver coins are quite noticeable as they have a more "whitish" look than the later cupronickel variety that were minted from 1951, also the silver coins wear less well. The cupronickel variety of coin consisted of 75% copper and 25% nickel.

The coin measured 1 1/8 inches (29 mm) in diameter and weighed 11.3 grams. The last florins were produced in 1968. When the currency was decimalised this coin continued to circulate alongside its replacement ten pence, and the florin was finally withdrawn from 1 June 1994 as a smaller ten pence coin was introduced.

The reverse design featuring a salmon was by English artist Percy Metcalfe. The obverse featured the Irish harp. From 1928 to 1937 the date was split either side of the harp with the name Saorstát Éireann circling around. From 1938 to 1968 the inscription changed to Éire on the left of the harp and the date on the right.

Like all Irish coins, the florin may be redeemed for euro at the Central Bank of Ireland.

== See also ==
- £sd
