= Shilling (Irish coin) =

Irish coin

Shilling / Scilling
- Ireland
- Value: 12 pence
- Mass: 5.65 g
- Diameter: 23.7 mm
- Thickness: 1.77 mm
- Edge: Milled
- Composition: Silver (1928–1942); Cupronickel (1942–1968)
- Years of minting: 1928–1968
- Catalog number: —

Obverse
- Design: Irish harp
- Design date: 1928

Reverse
- Design: Bull
- Designer: Percy Metcalfe
- Design date: 1928

The shilling (1s) (Irish: scilling) coin was a subdivision of the pre-decimal Irish pound, worth 1/20 of a pound. Worth 12d or half of a Florin.

The original minting of the coin from 1928 until 1942 contained 75% silver; this Irish coin had a higher content than the equivalent British coin. These earlier coins were noticeably different from their later counterparts as they were of a lighter hue than the cupronickel coins minted from 1951, and they resisted wear less well. The cupronickel coin contained 75% copper and 25% nickel.

The coin measured 0.935 inches (23.7 mm) in diameter and weighed 5.655 grams; this did not change with cupronickel coin. The last shillings were minted in 1968. When the currency was decimalised, this coin continued to circulate alongside its replacement five pence (which also featured a bull on the reverse); the shilling was finally withdrawn from circulation on 1 January 1993 as a smaller five pence coin was introduced.

The reverse design featuring a bull was by English artist Percy Metcalfe. The obverse featured the Irish harp. From 1928 to 1937 the date was split either side of the harp with the name Saorstát Éireann circling around. From 1938 to 1968 the inscription changed to Éire on the left of the harp and the date on the right.

== See also ==
- £sd
