= List of people on coins of the United Kingdom =

This is a list of people who have appeared on coins of the United Kingdom. The reigning monarch appears on the obverse of all coins, thus most of these listed were on the reverse. Names and titles listed are those of the person when the coin was struck, or on their death, whichever was first. The list does not include the national effigy Britannia who has featured on many circulated, commemorative and bullion coins.

== A ==
- Jane Austen (born 1775)
  - 2017: Two pound coin marking 200 years since her death.

== B ==
- Sir Roger Bannister (1929–2018)
  - 2004: Fifty pence piece marking fifty years since he did the first four-minute mile (face not shown).
- Isambard Kingdom Brunel (1806–1859)
  - 2006: Two pound coin marking 200 years since his birth.

== C ==
- Edith Cavell (1865–1915)
  - 2015: Five pound coin to mark the centenary of World War I.
- Charles III (born 1948; as Charles, Prince of Wales)
  - 1981: Twenty-five pence piece marking his wedding to Lady Diana Spencer.
  - 1998: Five pound coin marking his 50th birthday.
  - 2008: Five pound coin marking his 60th birthday.

As he is the current Monarch, his portrait will appear on the obverse of all coins, starting with a 2022 50p commemorating the death of Queen Elizabeth II.

- Sir Winston Churchill (1874–1965)
  - 1965: Crown marking his death.
  - 2015: Five pound coin marking the 50th anniversary of his death.

== D ==
- Charles Darwin: (1809–1882)
  - 2009: Two pound coin marking 200 years since his birth.
- Diana, Princess of Wales (1961–1997)
  - 1981: Twenty-five pence piece marking her wedding to Prince Charles.
  - 1999: Five pound coin marking her 1997 death.

== E ==
- Queen Elizabeth the Queen Mother (1900–2002)
  - 1980: Twenty-five pence piece marking 80th birthday.
  - 2000: Five pound coin marking 100th birthday.
- Queen Elizabeth I (1533–1603)
  - 2008: Five pound coin marking 450 years since accession.
- Queen Elizabeth II (1926–2022)
  - 1973: Fifty pence piece marking the UK's accession to the EEC (hand only).

== G ==
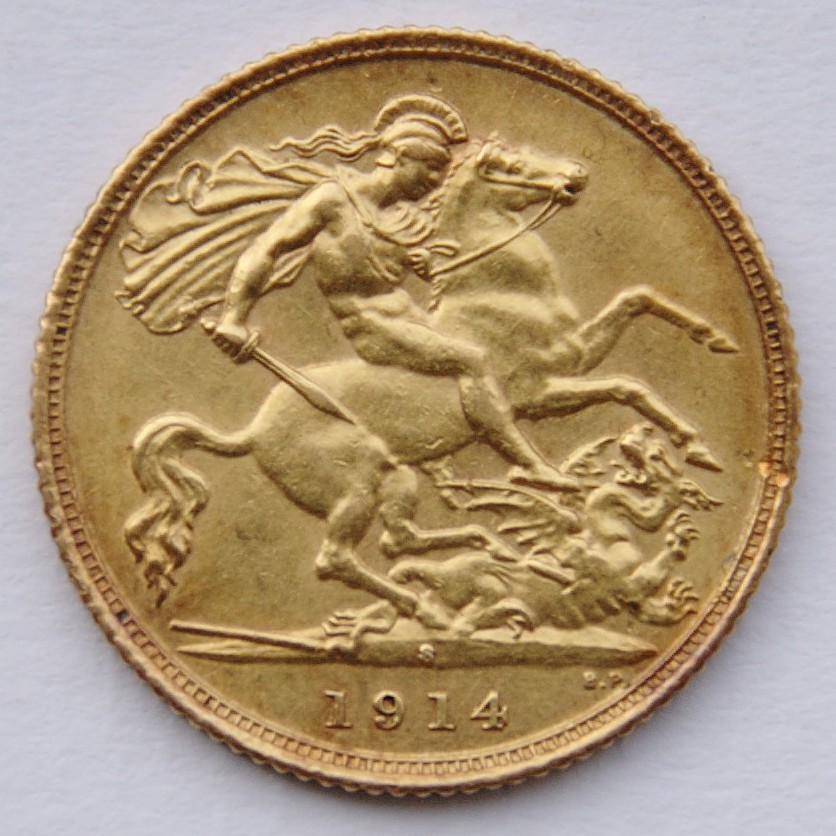
Saint George has featured on the gold sovereign since 1817

- Saint George (died 303)
  - 1817–: Gold sovereign.
  - 1817–: Half sovereign.
  - 2009–: Quarter sovereign.

== H ==
- King Henry VIII (1491–1547)
  - 2009: Five pound coin marking 500 years since accession.

== J ==
- King John
  - 2015: Two pound coin marking the 800th Anniversary of Magna Carta

== K ==
- Herbert Kitchener, 1st Earl Kitchener
  - 2014: Two pound coin marking 100 years since the outbreak of the First World War.

== N ==
- Admiral Horatio Nelson (1758–1805)
  - 2005: Five pound coin marking 200 years since his death.

== P ==
- Beatrix Potter
  - 2016: 50 pence coin marking 150 years since Beatrix Potter was born (image not shown).
- Prince Philip, Duke of Edinburgh (1921–2021)
  - 1997: Five pound coin marking 50 years since his marriage to Queen Elizabeth II (featured on obverse).
  - 2007: Five pound coin marking 60 years since his marriage to Queen Elizabeth II (featured on obverse)
  - 2011: Five pound coin marking his 90th birthday.

== V ==
- Queen Victoria (1819–1901)
  - 2001: Five pound coin marking 100 years since her death.

== See also ==
- List of people on coins of the United Kingdom colonies
