= 25P =

25P or 25p may refer to:

- 25P Microwave Systems Operator/Maintainer
- Twenty-five pence (British coin)
- Phosphorus-25 (^{25}P), an isotope of phosphorus

== See also ==
- P25 (disambiguation)
- Frame rate
- Crown (British coin)
