= List of people on coins of the United Kingdom colonies =

This is a list of people who have appeared on coins of the United Kingdom's colonies in the sterling zone. It does not include former colonies of the British Empire and their currencies. The reigning monarch has appeared on the obverse of all coins.

== Ascension Island ==
- Prince Andrew
  - 1984: Fifty pence coin for his royal visit...

== Falkland Islands ==
- Prince Andrew
  - 1985: Fifty pence coin for his opening of Mount Pleasant airport.
- Charles, Prince of Wales (1948–)
  - 1981: Fifty pence coin marking his marriage to Lady Diana Spencer.
- Diana, Princess of Wales (1961–1997)
  - 1981: Fifty pence coin marking her marriage to Prince Charles.
- Queen Elizabeth the Queen Mother (1900–2002)
  - 1980: Fifty pence coin marking her 80th birthday.

== Gibraltar ==
- Sir Winston Churchill (1874–1965)
  - 1993: Fourteen ECU coin.
- Queen Elizabeth the Queen Mother (1900–2002)
  - 1980: One crown coin marking 80th birthday.
  - 1990: One crown coin marking 90th birthday.
- Jesus Christ
  - 1990: Fifty pence coin marking Christmas.
  - 2005: Fifty pence coin marking Christmas.
- Joseph
  - 1990: Fifty pence coin marking Christmas.
  - 2003: Fifty pence coin marking Christmas.
- Mary
  - 1990: Fifty pence coin marking Christmas.
  - 2003: Fifty pence coin marking Christmas.
  - 2005: Fifty pence coin marking Christmas.
- Prince Philip (1921–)
  - 1997: Five pound coin marking the 50th anniversary of his wedding to Queen Elizabeth II (hand only).

== Guernsey ==
- Queen Elizabeth the Queen Mother (1900–2002)
  - 1980: Twenty-five pence coin marking her 80th birthday.
- William of Normandy
  - 1966: Ten shilling coin marking 900 years since the Norman Conquest of England.
  - 2005: One pound coin marking 915 years since his death.

== Tristan de Cunha ==
- Queen Elizabeth the Queen Mother (1900–2002)
  - 1980: Twenty-five pence marking 80th birthday
- Admiral Horatio Nelson
  - 2005: One crown coin marking 200 years since his death

== See also ==
- List of people on coins of the United Kingdom
