= P25 =

P25 may refer to:

- Project 25, standards for interoperable land mobile radio (LMR) systems
- Boulton & Paul P.25 Bugle, a British heavy bomber
- BRM P25, a Formula One racing car
- Honda P25, a moped
- Mabiha language
- P-25 mine, an Italian anti-personnel mine
- Papyrus 25, a biblical manuscript
- Phosphorus-25, an isotope of phosphorus
- Project 2025, a US political plan
- Zastava P25, a pistol
- a medium-format camera back by Phase One

== See also ==
- 25P (disambiguation)
