= Five pounds (British coin) =

Commemorative denomination of the pound sterling

- United Kingdom
- Value: £5.00 pound sterling
- Mass: 28.28 g
- Diameter: 38.61 mm
- Thickness: 2.89 mm
- Edge: Milled, with an inscription
- Composition: Cupro-nickel (75% Cu, 25% Ni); Silver (.925 sterling silver); Gold
- Years of minting: 1990–present

Obverse
- Design: King Charles III
- Designer: Martin Jennings
- Design date: 2022

Reverse
- Design: No standard reverse design; the design varies each year with the event being commemorated

The British five pound (£5) piece is a commemorative denomination of sterling coinage with a nominal value of five pounds. The obverse of new coins feature the profile of King Charles III; it previously depicted Queen Elizabeth II between the coin's introduction in 1990 and the Queen's death in 2022. Two different portraits of the Queen featured on the coin, with the last design by Ian Rank-Broadley being introduced in 1998. The coin has no standard reverse; instead it is altered each year to commemorate important events. Variant obverses have also been used on occasion.

The coin is a continuation of the crown, which after decimalisation became the commemorative twenty-five pence coin. The twenty-five pence was discontinued in 1981 after creating a large coin with such small value became prohibitively expensive. The five pound coin shares the same dimensions as the twenty-five pence coin, and the five shilling coin before it, but has a nominal value twenty times greater.

A £5 memorial crown featuring the image of Charles III was released on 3 October 2022 honouring the life and legacy of his mother Queen Elizabeth II - the UK's longest reigning monarch.

Separate five pound coin designs have also been released in various British crown dependencies and British Overseas Territories. These are outside of the scope of this article and are not listed below.

Five pound coins are legal tender in unlimited amounts, but are intended as souvenirs and are rarely seen in circulation. The coins are sold by the Royal Mint at face value and also, with presentation folders, at a premium to that face value. The vast majority of souvenir crowns were issued as "Brilliant Uncirculated" and were affordable by most collectors. The 2010 coins, with such folders, were sold for £9.95 each. Occasionally, to mark special occasions, the Royal Mint issued some crowns only struck in .925 sterling silver to a higher standard, known as "silver proof" and priced at £100 and upwards.

== Design ==
=== Obverse: Queen Elizabeth II ===
The designs which have appeared on the five pound coin's reverse are summarised in the table below.

| Number | Year | Image | Event | Design | Edge inscription | Reverse designer | Mintage |
|---|---|---|---|---|---|---|---|
| 1 | 1990 | | The Queen Mother's 90th birthday | A cypher in the letter 'E' in duplicate, above a royal crown flanked by a rose and a thistle all within the inscription QUEEN ELIZABETH THE QUEEN MOTHER and the dates 1900–1990 | | Leslie Durbin | 2,761,431 |
| 2 | 1993 | | The 40th anniversary of the Queen's Coronation | St Edward's Crown encircled by forty trumpets all within the inscription FAITH AND TRUTH I WILL BEAR UNTO YOU and the anniversary dates 1953–1993 | | Robert Elderton | 1,834,655 |
| 3 | 1996 | | The Queen's 70th birthday | A representation of Windsor Castle with five flag poles, two holding forked pennants with anniversary dates of 1926 and 1996, the other flags are Royal Arms, Union flag and the Queen's personal flag | | Avril Vaughan | 2,396,100 |
| 4 | 1997 | | Golden wedding anniversary of the Queen and the Duke of Edinburgh | A pair of shields, chevronwise, on the left, shield of the Royal arms, on the right, shield of Prince Philip, above a royal crown and the date 20 NOVEMBER, below an anchor cabled and FIVE POUNDS | | Leslie Durbin | 1,733,000 |
| 5 | 1998 | | Prince Charles' 50th birthday | A portrait of Prince Charles and in the background words relating to the work of The Prince's Trust. A circumscription of FIFTIETH BIRTHDAY OF HRH PRINCE OF WALES and below FIVE POUNDS flanked by anniversary dates of 1948 and 1998 | | Michael Noakes and Robert Elderton | 1,407,300 |
| 6 | 1999 | | Diana, Princess of Wales memorial crown | A portrait of Diana, Princess of Wales with the dates 1961 and 1997, circumscription IN MEMORY OF DIANA PRINCESS OF WALES and the value FIVE POUNDS | | David Cornell | 5,396,300 |
| 7 | 1999 | | Millennium Crown | A representation of a dial of a clock, hands set at 12 o'clock with a map of the British Isles and the dates 1999 and 2000 and the words ANNO DOMINI and the value FIVE POUNDS | WHAT'S PAST IS PROLOGUE | Jeffrey Matthews | 5,396,300 |
| 8 | 2000 | | Millennium Crown | A representation of a dial of a clock, hands set at 12 o'clock with a map of the British Isles and the dates 1999 and 2000 and the words ANNO DOMINI and the value FIVE POUNDS | WHAT'S PAST IS PROLOGUE (from The Tempest) | Jeffrey Matthews | 3,147,092 |
| 9 | 2000 | | The Queen Mother's 100th birthday | A portrait of the Queen Mother, flanked by groups of people with the circumscription QUEEN ELIZABETH THE QUEEN MOTHER, the anniversary dates 1900–2000. Below the portrait a representation of her signature. | | Ian Rank-Broadley | 3,147,092 |
| 10 | 2001 | | 100th anniversary of the death of Queen Victoria | A representation of the Crystal Palace within the value FIVE POUNDS, stylised railway lines in the shape of a V incorporating a portrait of Queen Victoria, remnant of the words ONE PENNY and anniversary dates of 1901 and 2001 | | Mary Milner-Dickens | 851,491 |
| 11 | 2002 | | Golden Jubilee of Queen Elizabeth II | A portrait of the Queen with the value FIVE POUNDS below | | Ian Rank-Broadley | 3,469,243 |
| 12 | 2002 | | Queen Mother memorial crown | A portrait of the Queen Mother encircled by a wreath and with the circumscription QUEEN ELIZABETH THE QUEEN MOTHER and the dates 1900–2002 | STRENGTH DIGNITY LAUGHTER | Avril Vaughan | 3,469,243 |
| 13 | 2003 | | 50th anniversary of the Queen's Coronation | GOD SAVE THE QUEEN in the centre surrounded by the words CORONATION JUBILEE FIVE POUNDS and the anniversary date 2003 | | Tom Phillips | 1,307,147 |
| 14 | 2004 | | 100th anniversary of the Entente Cordiale between Great Britain and France | Combined figures of Britannia and Marianne, with the words ENTENTE CORDIALE and the anniversary dates 1904 and 2004 | | David Gentleman | 1,205,594 |
| 15 | 2005 | | 200th anniversary of the Battle of Trafalgar | Design features HMS Victory and HMS Termeraire in battle surrounded by inscription TRAFALGAR and the dates 1805 and 2005 | | Clive Duncan | 1,075,516 |
| 16 | 2005 | | 200th anniversary of the death of Horatio Nelson | A portrait of Horatio Nelson and the dates 1805 and 2005 | ENGLAND EXPECTS EVERYMAN TO DO HIS DUTY | James Butler | 1,075,516 |
| 17 | 2006 | | The Queen's 80th birthday | Three trumpets with trumpet banners accompanied by the inscription 1926 VIVAT REGINA 2006 | DUTY SERVICE FAITH | Danuta Solowiej-Wedderburn | 52,267 |
| 18 | 2007 | | Diamond wedding anniversary of the Queen and the Duke of Edinburgh | The Rayonnant Gothic rose window of Westminster Abbey accompanied by the inscription TVEATVR VNITA DEVS ("may God guard [these] united"), the dates 1947 and 2007, and the denomination FIVE POUNDS | MY STRENGTH AND STAY | Emma Noble | 30,561 |
| 19 | 2008 | | 450th anniversary of the Accession of Queen Elizabeth I | A portrait of Queen Elizabeth I crowned and set within a mandorla. A rose has been placed at each connecting point while the two side arches each contain a leaf pattern reminiscent of the carvings made by Robert Dudley, 1st Earl of Leicester. The year of her accession and the year of the anniversary are both shown in Roman numerals. | I HAVE REIGNED WITH YOUR LOVES | Rod Kelly | 20,047 |
| 20 | 2008 | | Prince Charles' 60th birthday | A portrait of Prince Charles | SIXTIETH BIRTHDAY | Ian Rank-Broadley | 14,088 |
| 21 | 2009 | | 500th anniversary of the Accession of Henry VIII | | | John Bergdahl | 67,119 |
| 22 | 2009 | | Countdown to 2012: 3 | Two swimmers, and countdown number '3'. The words COUNTDOWN above and XXX OLYMPIAD below; the London 2012 logo on the left, the date 2009 on the right. | | Claire Aldridge | 184,921 |
| 23 | 2010 | | 350th anniversary of the Restoration of the Monarchy | | | David Cornell | 30,247 |
| 24 | 2010 | | Countdown to 2012: 2 | Two runners, and countdown number '2'. The words COUNTDOWN above and XXX OLYMPIAD below; the London 2012 logo on the left, the date 2010 below the image. | | Claire Aldridge | 153,080 |
| 25 | 2011 | | Royal Wedding: Prince William and Miss Catherine Middleton | | | Mark Richards | 250,000 |
| 26 | 2011 | | 90th birthday of the Duke of Edinburgh | | | Mark Richards | 18,730 |
| 27 | 2011 | | Countdown to 2012: 1 | Cyclist, and countdown number '1'. The words COUNTDOWN above and XXX OLYMPIAD below; the London 2012 logo on the right, the date 2011 on the left. | | Claire Aldridge | 52,261 |
| 28 | 2012 | | Diamond Jubilee of Queen Elizabeth II | | | Ian Rank-Broadley | 484,775 |
| 29 | 2012 | | Countdown to 2012 | Three medallists on a podium. The words COUNTDOWN above and XXX OLYMPIAD below; the London 2012 logo on the right, the date 2012 above the image. | | Claire Aldridge | 52,261 |
| 30 | 2012 | | Olympic Games | London skyline with the inscription LONDON 2012 above, surrounded by a selection of sporting images, and the London 2012 logo at the top. | | Saiman Miah | 315,983 |
| 31 | 2012 | | Paralympic Games | Segments of a target, a spoked wheel, a stopwatch and the clock-face of the Palace of Westminster. The inscription LONDON 2012 is upper left, and London 2012 Paralympic logo is lower left. | | Pippa Sanderson | 55,524 |
| 32 | 2013 | | 60th anniversary of the coronation of Queen Elizabeth II | | | Emma Noble | 57,262 |
| 33 | 2013 | | Birth of Prince George (Silver Proof Only) | | | | 7,460 |
| 34 | 2013 | | Christening of Prince George | | | John Bergdahl | 56,014 |
| 35 | 2014 | | 300th anniversary of the death of Queen Anne | | | Mark Richards | 12,181 |
| 36 | 2014 | | Prince George's first birthday (Silver Proof Only) | | | | 7,500 |
| 37 | 2015 | | 50th anniversary of the death of Winston Churchill | | | Mark Richards | 18,161 |
| 38 | 2015 | | 200th anniversary of the Battle of Waterloo | | | David Lawrence | 24,554 |
| 39 | 2015 | | Birth of Princess Charlotte | | | John Bergdahl | 3,000 (C) |
| 40 | 2015 | | Christening of Princess Charlotte | | | John Bergdahl | |
| 41 | 2015 | | Second birthday of Prince George (Silver Proof Only) | | | | |
| 42 | 2015 | | Longest reigning monarch | | | James Butler | |
| 43 | 2016 | | 90th birthday of Queen Elizabeth II | | | Christopher Hobbs | 9,360 (C) |
| 44 | 2017 | | House of Windsor (100th Anniversary) | | | Timothy Noad | |
| 45 | 2017 | | 1000th anniversary of the coronation of King Canute | | | Lee R. Jones | 7,100 (C) |
| 46 | 2017 | | Sapphire Jubilee of Elizabeth II | | | Glyn Davies | 5,980 (C) |
| 47 | 2017 | | Prince Philip: Celebrating a Life of Service | | | Humphrey Paget | 3,750 (C) |
| 48 | 2017 | | Remembrance Day | | | Stephen Taylor | 12,720 (C) |
| 49 | 2017 | | Platinum Wedding of Queen Elizabeth II and Prince Philip | | | John Bergdahl | 2,760 (C) |
| 50 | 2017 | | Christmas tree | | | Edwina Ellis | 12,030 (C) |
| 51 | 2017 | | The Queen's Beasts I: The Lion of England | | | Jody Clark | 15,000 (C) |
| 52 | 2017 | | The Queen's Beasts II: The Unicorn of Scotland | | | Jody Clark | 3,570 (C) |
| 53 | 2018 | | The Queen's Beasts III: The Red Dragon of Wales | | | Jody Clark | 2,870 (C) |
| 54 | 2018 | | Fifth birthday of Prince George | | | Jody Clark | 2,970 (C) |
| 55 | 2018 | | Four generations of royalty | | | Timothy Noad | 9,300 (C) |
| 56 | 2018 | | The Queen's Beasts IV: The Black Bull of Clarence | | | Jody Clark | 3,010 (C) |
| 57 | 2018 | | Royal Wedding: Prince Henry and Ms Meghan Markle | | | Jody Clark | 20,250 (C) |
| 58 | 2018 | | 65th anniversary of the coronation of Queen Elizabeth II | | | Stephen Taylor | 3,300 (C) |
| 59 | 2018 | | The Pride of England | As 2017 version; reissued dated 2018 for the FIFA World Cup. | | Jody Clark | 5,100 (C) |
| 60 | 2018 | | Remembrance Day (2018) | | | Laura Clancy | 4,000 (C) |
| 61 | 2018 | | The Nutcracker | | | Harry Brockway | 12,000 (C) |
| 62 | 2018 | | Prince Charles' 70th birthday | | | Robert Elderton | 5,000 (C) |
| 63 | 2018 | | Royal Academy of Arts | | | David Chipperfield | 2,190 (C) |
| 64 | 2019 | | The Queen's Beasts V: The Falcon of the Plantagenets | | | Jody Clark | 3,690 (C) |
| 65 | 2019 | | Legend of the Ravens (Tower of London) | | | Jody Clark | 5,400 (C) |
| 66 | 2019 | | The Queen's Beasts VI: The Yale of Beaufort | | | Jody Clark | 2,940 (C) |
| 67 | 2019 | | The Crown Jewels (Tower of London) | | | Glyn Davies | 4,200 (C) |
| 68 | 2019 | | 200th anniversary of the birth of Queen Victoria | | | John Bergdahl | 15,030 (C) |
| 69 | 2019 | | The Yeoman Wardens (Tower of London) | | | Glyn Davies | 6,600 (C) |
| 70 | 2019 | | The Lion of England – Cricket World Cup | | | Jody Clark | 6,720 (C) |
| 71 | 2019 | | Ceremony of the Keys (Tower of London) | | | Glyn Davies | 8,700 (C) |
| 72 | 2020 | | Lunar Year of the Rat | | | P. J. Lynch | |
| 73 | 2019 | | 100 years of Remembrance Day | | | Harry Brockway | 6,300 (C) |
| 74 | 2020 | | The Queen's Beasts VII: The White Lion of Mortimer | | | Jody Clark | 3,610 (C) |
| 75 | 2020 | | 200th anniversary of the death of George III | Incorporates an effigy of the king in the centre alongside the King's Observatory and Windsor Castle around the outside | | Dominique Evans | 9,240 (C) |
| 76 | 2020 | | Music legends: Queen | Features the band's logo QUEEN and instruments played by the members: Bechstein grand piano played by Freddie Mercury for "Bohemian Rhapsody", May's "Red Special" guitar, Roger Taylor's Ludwig bass drum with an early-day Queen crest and John Deacon's Fender Precision Bass. | | Chris Facey | 8,160 (C) |
| 77 | 2020 | | The Queen's Beasts VIII: The White Horse of Hanover | | | Jody Clark | 2,630 (C) |
| 78 | 2020 | | 250th anniversary of the birth of William Wordsworth | | | David Lawrence | 5,600 (C) |
| 79 | 2020 | | Bond, James Bond | | | Christian Davies and Matt Dent | 2,010 (C) |
| 80 | 2020 | | Pay Attention 007 (James Bond) | | | Christian Davies and Matt Dent | 1,830 (C) |
| 81 | 2020 | | Shaken Not Stirred (James Bond) | | | Christian Davies and Matt Dent | 1,380 (C) |
| 82 | 2020 | | The White Tower (Tower of London) | | | Timothy Noad | 2,370 (C) |
| 83 | 2020 | | The Royal Menagerie (Tower of London) | | | Timothy Noad | 1,620 (C) |
| 84 | 2020 | | The Royal Mint (Tower of London) | | | Timothy Noad | 1,500 (C) |
| 85 | 2020 | | The Infamous Prison (Tower of London) | | | Timothy Noad | 2,580 (C) |
| 86 | 2020 | | Music legends: Elton John | | | Bradley Morgan Johnson | 2,160 (C) |
| 87 | 2020 | | 150th anniversary of the British Red Cross | | | Henry Gray | 16,580 (C) |
| 88 | 2020 | | 75th anniversary of the end of the Second World War | | | Matthew Dent and Christian Davies | 7,300 (C) |
| 89 | 2020 | | Remembrance Day (2020) | | | Natasha Preece | 1,170 (C) |
| 90 | 2021 | | The White Greyhound of Richmond | | | Harry Brockway | 2,910 (C) |
| 91 | 2021 | | Lunar Year of the Ox | | | Jody Clark | |
| 92 | 2020 | | Music legends: David Bowie | | | Jody Clark | 3,450 (C) |
| 93 | 2021 | | The 95th birthday of Her Majesty The Queen | | | Timothy Noad | 3,180 (C) |
| 94 | 2021 | | The Griffin of Edward III | | | Jody Clark | 2,700 (C) |
| 95 | 2021 | | Mr. Happy – The 50th anniversary of Mr. Men Little Miss | | | Adam Hargreaves | 8,200 (C) |
| 96 | 2021 | | Mr. Strong and Little Miss Giggles – The 50th anniversary of Mr. Men Little Miss | | | Adam Hargreaves | 6,200 (C) |
| 97 | 2021 | | Little Miss Sunshine – The 50th anniversary of Mr. Men Little Miss | | | Adam Hargreaves | 6,900 (C) |
| 98 | 2021 | | The 150th anniversary of the Royal Albert Hall | | | Anne Desmet | 3,160 (C) |
| 99 | 2021 | | Alfred the Great | | | John Bergdahl | 2,610 (C) |
| 100 | 2021 | | The Tale of Peter Rabbit | Heartwarming scene of whole rabbit family. Inscribed above: "Now run along, and don't get into mischief. I am going out." | | Obverse/Reverse Jody Clark / Ffion Gwillim | 69,000 (C) |
| 101 | 2021 | | The Queen's Beasts | All ten beasts together on single coin to celebrate the series as a whole. This coin is also known as a "Completer" coin. | | Jody Clark | 1,160 (C) |
| 102 | 2021 | | Music legends: The Who | Design includes a Union Jack flag, mod logo, and a Rickenbacker guitar | | Henry Gray | 17,070 (C) |
| 103 | 2021 | | HRH Prince Philip - Duke of Edinburgh | Portrait of HRH Prince Philip, which he approved. | | Ian Rank-Broadley FRBS | |
| 104 | 2021 | | Alice in Wonderland | Alice and one of the most mischievous characters from the book, the Cheshire Cat. | | Ffion Gwillim | |
| 105 | 2021 | | Alice Through the Looking Glass | Alice with the comedic duo, Tweedledee and Tweedledum. | | Ffion Gwillim | |
| 106 | 2021 | | UK Remembrance Day | At the going down of the sun & in the morning we will remember them. Four red poppies lower right. | | Gary Breeze | |
| 107 | 2021 | | Mahatma Gandhi - Celebrating one of the greatest icons of the twentieth century. | One of Gandhi's most famous quotes - "My life is my message", also features an image of a sacred lotus, the national flower of India, symbolising Gandhi's gentle strength. | | Heena Glover | |
| 108 | 2021 | | Lunar Year of the Tiger | Tiger approaching head-on. | | David Lawrence | |
| 109 | 2022 | | 120 Years - The Tale of Peter Rabbit | Peter Rabbit running right through a garland of flowers with "120 Years" above left with bird perched above and butterfly below | | Ffion Gwillim | |
| 110 | 2022 | | Seymour Panther (Royal Tudor Beasts Series) | Although the stone beast is depicted as a ferocious animal, with flames coming from its mouth and ears, the Seymour Panther symbolised a peaceful and loving union between the king and consort. | | David Lawrence | |
| 111 | 2022 | | The Lion of England (Royal Tudor Beasts Series) | Crowned seated lion, roaring & holding shield. | | David Lawrence | |
| 112 | 2022 | | The 40th Birthday of HRH The Duke of Cambridge | Portrait of Prince William with 40 and a crowned "W" in background. | | Thomas T. Docherty | |
| 113 | 2022 | | Platinum Jubilee of Elizabeth II | Royal Mantle as a surround, as it was used on the coinage of William IV and the dates 1952–2022 in a poignant tribute to her incredible 70 years of service to the crown. | | John Bergdahl | |
| 114 | 2022 | | Platinum Jubilee - Special Commemorative Obverse | Reverse as above. Obverse Queen Elizabeth II on horseback wearing her garter robes in a fitting tribute to her 70 years on the throne. | | John Bergdahl | |
| 115 | 2022 | | The Queen's Reign - Honours & Investiture | A range of medals including the George Cross, Victoria Cross and the Distinguished Flying Cross. "THE BESTOWING OF HER HONOURS", inscribed above and the Queen's signature below. (The first time the Queen's signature has appeared on a UK coin). | | P.J. Lynch | |
| 116 | 2022 | | The Queen's Reign - Charity and Patronage | An arch of Maundy money from the time of Charles II. "HER CHARITY AND HER PATRONAGE", inscribed above and the Queen's signature below. | | P.J. Lynch | |
| 117 | 2022 | | The Queen's Reign - The Commonwealth | Including a depiction of Her Majesty's Personal Flag featuring the crowned letter "E". Above is inscribed "HER COMMONWEALTH OF NATIONS, the Queen's signature below. | | P.J. Lynch | |
| 118 | 2022 | | 100th Anniversary of the Discovery of Tutankhamun's Tomb | A profile of Tutankhamun's iconic gold mask which remained undisturbed for over 3000 years | | Laura Clancy | |
| 119 | 2022 | | The Rolling Stones (Music Legends Series) | An outline of the group in action under spotlights with their name above and their dates below. | | Hannah Phizacklea | |
| 120 | 2023 | | Lunar Year of the Rabbit | Rabbit seated in field facing left with leaves and Chinese symbols around and "YEAR OF THE RABBIT 2023" above. | | Louie Maryon | |
| 121 | 2023 | | Yale of Beaufort (Royal Tudor Beasts Series) | With the body of a goat, tusks of a boar and tail of a lion, the Yale of Beaufort is one of the most peculiar of the ten heraldic guardians. the Yale of Beaufort is depicted the Arms of Jane Seymour to reinforce her authority and influence as the king's new wife. | | David Lawrence | |

=== Obverse: King Charles III ===
| Number | Year | Image | Event | Design | Edge Inscription | Designer | Mintage |
|---|---|---|---|---|---|---|---|
| 1 | 2022 | | Death of Queen Elizabeth II | Design features portraits of Elizabeth II in her early reign and late reign, along with St. Edward's Crown and her royal cypher | | John Bergdahl | |
| 2 | 2023 | | Coronation of Charles III and Camilla | Design features of coronation regalia, St Edward's crown and sovereign's two sceptres. | | Timothy Noad | |
| 3 | 2023 | | The 75th Birthday of His Majesty King Charles III. | A crowned Royal Cipher with a bee below and 75 under with the dates 1948 and 2023 separated by a dragonfly below and the inscription "HIS MAJESTY KING CHARLES III" above. | | Dan Thorne | |
| 4 | 2023 | | The Pride of England - Lionesses. | Three lions horizontal with the value under to celebrate significant success for the women's football team, who won UEFA Women's Euro 2022 and reached the final of the 2023 FIFA Women's World Cup. | | Norman Sillman | |
| 5 | 2023 | | Celebrating the life of Mary Seacole | A portrait of Mary Seacole against a Union Flag and her name to the left. | | Sandra Deiana | |
| 6 | 2023 | | Dame Shirley Bassey DBE (Music Legends) | A gold silhouette of Dame Shirley in front of her name in large letters which also contains the names of three James Bond films for which she sang the title songs. | | Sue Aperghis | |
| 7 | 2023 | | The Police (Music Legends) | A shadowy depiction of the punk-rock band in action with the groups name above. | | Heena Glover | |
| 8 | 2023 | | The Bull of Clarence (Royal Tudor Beasts) | The seated Bull of Clarence is depicted holding a simple shield with the Tudor Rose at its centre to signify the union of the House of York and the House of Lancaster. | | David Lawrence | |
| 9 | 2023 | | King Arthur - (Myths & Legends series) | Portrait of King Arthur clasping his sword Excalibur held vertical. | | David Lawrence | |
| 10 | 2023 | | Merlin - (Myths & Legends series) | A depiction of the legendary powerful wizard holding his magical staff with an owl perched on his shoulder and the mythical island of Avalon in the background | | David Lawrence | |
| 11 | 2023 | | Morgan Le Fay - (Myths & Legends series) | A portrayal of Morgan as a dark and powerful enchantress, a supernatural antagonist in the Arthurian legend. | | David Lawrence | |
| 12 | 2023 | | Bond Films of the 60s - (Six Decades of James Bond) | All Bond Film reverse designs appear to be looking down the barrel of a gun. For the 60s the reverse design is Bond flying the famous "Little Nellie" autogyro from You Only Live Twice, with the 007 symbol below. The names of all the other Bond films of the 60s form the background. | | Matt Dent & Christian Davies | |
| 13 | 2023 | | Bond Films of the 70s | The famous submarine car "Wet Nellie", from The Spy Who Loved Me, features on the reverse and once more the film titles of all the 1970s Bond movies adorn the background. | | Matt Dent & Christian Davies | |
| 14 | 2024 | | Seymour Unicorn (Royal Tudor Beasts Series) | The Seymour Unicorn is pictured standing on his hind legs holding the full un-maritaled arms of the Queen, which is extremely unusual as most shields are maritaled - split in half with the husband coat of arms on the right and the wife's on the left - as viewed from the front. | | David Lawrence | |
| 15 | 2024 | | Lunar Year of the Dragon | Featuring a head-on depiction of a dragon with the inscription "YEAR OF THE DRAGON . 2024" above. | | William Webb | |
| 16 | 2024 | | Buckingham Palace | An iconic image of the centre of the palace with the Royal Standard flying above and the name below surrounded by swirly curly flora. | | Henry Gray | |
| 17 | 2024 | | George Michael (Music Legends) | A portrait of George Michael wearing sunglasses with the neck of a guitar behind and his name in the lower right. | | Sandra Deiana | |
| 18 | 2024 | | Tudor Dragon -(Royal Tudor Beasts) | A seated dragon breathing fire while holding a portcullis shield. | | David Lawrence | |
| 19 | 2024 | | Robin Hood (Myths & Legends series) | Robin Hood is featured up in a tree, drawing his bow ready to loose, sword by his side and quiver behind. | | Jody Clark | |
| 20 | 2024 | | Maid Marian (Myths & Legends series) | Maid Marian is pictured by a tree in the forest carrying her long bow and quiver. | | Jody Clark | |
| 21 | 2024 | | Bond Films of the 80s | 007's BD-J5 Acrostar jet from the opening sequence of Octopussy is featured on the reverse with the famous 007 logo below and the names of all the other 80s films providing the background. | | Matt Dent & Christian Davies | |
| 22 | 2024 | | Bond Films of the 90s | The reverse design features Pierce Brosnan as 007 giving chase on the river Thames in the Q Branch experimental speedboat in a scene from The World Is Not Enough The famous 007 logo is below and the names of all the other 90s films providing the background. | | Matt Dent & Christian Davies | |
| 23 | 2024 | | Bond Films of the 2000s | Taken from the opening hovercraft chase sequence from Die Another Day, the reverse design, like all the others also features the famous 007 logo below and the names of all the other 2000s in the background. | | Matt Dent & Christian Davies | |
| 24 | 2024 | | Bond Films of the 2010s | Featuring the Britten-Norman BN-2 Islander plane scene in Spectre when Bond attempts to rescue Dr Swan. Again the 007 logo is below with the names of the other films of the 2010s in the background. | | Matt Dent & Christian Davies | |
| 25 | 2025 | | Freddie Mercury (Music Legends) | Featuring Freddie Mercury mid-performance at Queen at Wembley with the iconic yellow jacket. | | Henry Gray | |
| 26 | 2025 | | Lunar Year of the Snake | Features a wise and dynamic reverse design snake with the inscription "YEAR OF THE SNAKE . 2025" above. | | Chris Costello | |
| 27 | 2025 | | The Queen’s Panther | Featuring the Queen’s Panther sculpture that stands at the mouth of the gate on the iconic Moat Bridge at Hampton Court Palace. | | David Lawrence | |
| 28 | 2025 | | The Waterloo Medal Victory | Depicting two equestrian figures at its centre, bearing the features of the Duke of Wellington and General Blücher galloping towards glory, as they are guided by the figure of a flying Victory. | | Benedetto Pistrucci | |
| 29 | 2025 | | The Greyhound of Richmond | Featuring the greyhound on the Moat Bridge bears a shield shaped like those used for jousting. | | David Lawrence | |
| 30 | 2025 | | John Lennon(Music Legends) | Featuring the singer-songwriter’s unmistakable image alongside the word ‘IMAGINE’, the title of his most famous politically charged song. | | Henry Gray | |
| 31 | 2025 | | The Coat of Arms of His Majesty King Charles III | Featuring the new rendering of the Coat of Arms of His Majesty King Charles. | | Timothy Noad | |
| 32 | 2025 | | 150 Years of Liberty | Featuring the brand's signature floral and paisley prints combined with the architecture of the historic Great Marlborough Street Tudor-style building. | | Liberty Design Team | |
| 33 | 2025 | | Iron Maiden(Music Legends) | Featuring bespoke artwork by acclaimed Iron Maiden artist Alberto ‘Akirant’ Quirantes with iconic mascot ‘Eddie’ | | Alberto "Akirant" Quirantes | |
| 34 | 2025 | | 75th Birthday of The Princess Royal | Featuring a faithful recreation of an official photographic portrait of the Princess alongside her Coat of Arms. | | Thomas T. Docherty | |
| 35 | 2025 | | The Four Nations | Featuring the heraldic creatures that symbolise England, Northern Ireland, Scotland and Wales. | | Gregory Cameron | |
| 36 | 2026 | | Lunar Year of the Horse | The design depicts the horse beneath a clock striking 12 with the inscription "YEAR OF THE HORSE . 2026" above. | | William Webb | |
| 37 | 2026 | | Portraits of a Queen - The First Effigy | Featuring a portrait of young Queen Elizabeth II wearing a laurel wreath. | | Gordon Summers | |
| 38 | 2026 | | The Queen's Lion | Featuring a Queen’s Lion holding a shield bearing the coat of arms of Jane Seymour. | | David Lawrence | |
| 39 | 2026 | | Portraits of a Queen - The Second Effigy | Featuring the 1968 portrait of Queen Elizabeth II wearing the Girls of Great Britain and Ireland Tiara. | | Gordon Summers | |
| 40 | 2026 | | Life of Queen Victoria | The coin shows depictions of Queen Victoria at two key points in her reign that are based on sculptures of the monarch. | | Edwina Ellis | |
| 41 | 2026 | | The Angel | Featuring a modern reinterpretation of Archangel Michael slaying Satan in the form of a dragon. | | Sandra Deiana | |
| 42 | 2026 | | Portraits of a Queen - The Third Effigy | Featuring a portrait of Queen Elizabeth II wearing the Diamond Diadem, pearl earrings, and a necklace. | | Gordon Summers | |
| 43 | 2026 | | Portraits of a Queen - The Fourth Effigy | Featuring a realistic portrait of Queen Elizabeth II sculpted by Ian Rank-Broadley. | | Gordon Summers | |
| 44 | 2026 | | The Great British Coin Hunt | Featuring planetary orbits, cryptic symbols, numbers, and letters designed to serve as a physical code-breaking key and decipher. | | Christian Davies & Matt Dent | |
| 45 | 2026 | | Portraits of a Queen - The Fifth Effigy | Featuring Jody Clark's final definitive coinage portrait of Queen Elizabeth II. | | Gordon Summers | |
| 46 | 2026 | | Spice Girls (Music Legends) | Featuring silhouettes of Victoria Beckham (Posh), Melanie Chisholm (Sporty), Emma Bunton (Baby), Geri Halliwell-Horner (Ginger), and Melanie Brown (Scary) paired with their individual signatures. | | Ffion Gwillim | |
| 47 | 2026 | | 100th Anniversary of the Birth of Queen Elizabeth II | The design was inspired by the ironwork at St George's Chapel. The legend reads 'QUEEN ELIZABETH II EXALTABITUR IN GLORIA' with '1926' and '2026' below. | | Timothy Noad | |
| 48 | 2026 | | The Royal Tudor Beasts - The Royal Dragon | Featuring a dynamic, anatomically detailed illustration of the Royal Dragon with bat-like wings, a fiery tongue, and a shield. | | David Lawrence | |
| 49 | 2026 | | Pink Floyd (Music Legends) | Featuring the iconic prism from the album cover for The Dark Side of the Moon (1973) at its centrepiece. | | Henry Gray | |
| 50 | 2026 | | 500 Years of the Crown | Featuring a crowned Tudor double-rose encircled by the royal cyphers of King Charles III and Queen Camilla, alongside the inscription "Anniversary of the Crown 1526–2026". | | Tim Noad | |

C = Circulating

== Coin sets ==
Additionally, the Royal Mint have released a number of five pound coin sets in silver proof quality.

=== 2012 Olympics Set ===
A series of 18 commemorative £5 coins were issued to celebrate the London 2012 Olympics.

1. Mind Stonehenge
2. Mind Big Ben
3. Mind Angel of the North
4. Mind Flying Scotsman
5. Mind The Globe Theatre
6. Mind Sir Isaac Newton
7. Body Giant's Causeway
8. Body The Great British Oak
9. Body River Thames
10. Body Weather
11. Body British Fauna
12. Body The Coastline of Britain
13. Spirit Courage
14. Spirit Pageantry
15. Spirit Unity
16. Spirit Music
17. Spirit Humour
18. Spirit Tolerance

=== Queen's Portrait Set ===
Four proof coins were released as part of the 2013 Queen's Portrait set. These coins feature the four portraits of Elizabeth II that appear on British coins.

=== The Portrait of Britain Set ===
Sixteen silver proof coins have been released as part of the 'Portrait of Britain' set.

- 2015 Big Ben (Elizabeth Tower)
- 2015 Tower Bridge
- 2015 Trafalgar Square
- 2015 Buckingham Palace
- 2016 White Cliffs of Dover
- 2016 Giant's Causeway
- 2016 Lake District
- 2016 Snowdonia
- 2017 Westminster Abbey
- 2017 Hampton Court Palace
- 2017 Downing Street
- 2017 Edinburgh Castle
- 2018 Blackpool
- 2018 Brighton
- 2018 Tenby
- 2018 Southwold

=== The First World War Set ===
A series of silver proof coins have been released as part of the 'First World War' set. 36 coins were released as part of this series.

- 2014 - British Expeditionary Force
- 2014 - Royal Navy Coin
- 2014 - Home Front Coin
- 2014 - Walter Tull
- 2014 - Propaganda
- 2014 - Howitzer Gun
- 2015 - Albert Ball VC
- 2015 - Animals at War
- 2015 - Submarines
- 2015 - Edith Cavell
- 2015 - Merchant Navy
- 2015 - Gallipoli
- 2016 - Poetry and Language
- 2016 - The Somme
- 2016 - Jutland
- 2016 - Jack Cornwell VC
- 2016 - The Army
- 2016 - Dreadnought
- 2017 - Noel Godfrey Chavasse VC
- 2017 - The dedication of the medical services
- 2017 - The cultural importance of the war artist
- 2017 - The Sopwith Camel
- 2017 - Gas warfare
- 2017 - The Battle of Arras
- 2018 - TE Lawrence
- 2018 - Ypres
- 2018 - Tanks
- 2018 - Royal Air Force
- 2018 - Women in factories
- 2018 - Widows left behind
- 2018 - Remembrance Day
- 2018 - War Memorials
- 2018 - Poppies
- 2018 - Imperial War Museums
- 2018 - Commonwealth War Graves
- 2018 - Peace

| Preceded by Twenty Five Pence | Crown-sized British coin 1990–Present | Succeeded by Current |
