= Twenty-five pence (British coin) =

British commemorative coin

- United Kingdom
- Value: £0.25 pound sterling
- Mass: 28.28 g
- Diameter: 38.61 mm
- Thickness: 2.5 mm
- Edge: Milled
- Composition: 75% Cu, 25% Ni
- Years of minting: 1971–1981

Obverse
- Design: Queen Elizabeth II
- Designer: Arnold Machin
- Design date: 1963

Reverse
- Design: Lady Diana Spencer and Charles, Prince of Wales
- Designer: Philip Nathan
- Design date: 1981

The British decimal twenty-five pence (25p; also called a crown) piece is a commemorative denomination of sterling coinage issued in four designs between 1972 and 1981; they have a nominal value of 1/4 of a pound. These coins were a post-decimalisation continuation of the traditional crown with the same face value (five shillings, equal to 1/4 of a pound). Uniquely in British decimal coinage, the coins do not have their value stated on them. This is because previous crowns rarely did so. The British regular issue coin closest to the coin's nominal value is the twenty pence coin.

Twenty-five pence coin issues were discontinued after 1981 due to the prohibitive cost to the Royal Mint of producing such large coins with such small value. From 1990 the "crown" was revived as the commemorative five pound coin, having the same dimensions and weight but a value twenty times as great. The two can be distinguished because the five pound coin is marked with its value.

The decimal twenty-five pence piece remains legal tender in amounts up to £10, although they were not intended for circulation as they are commemorative issues. The coins weigh 28.28 g (0.909 ozt) and have a diameter of 38.61 mm. The coins were minted in Copper-Nickel. There were 4 designs.

== Designs ==
The following 25p coins were produced:

1972 issue	To celebrate the Silver wedding anniversary of Queen Elizabeth II and Prince Philip, Duke of Edinburgh. Obverse: The standard portrait of Queen Elizabeth II by Arnold Machin with the inscription D·G·REG·F·D· ELIZABETH II. Reverse: The initials EP crowned and with a floral garland, with a naked figure of Eros at the centre. The inscription reads: ELIZABETH AND PHILIP 20 NOVEMBER 1947 - 1972. This face was also designed by Arnold Machin. Both faces are encircled by dots. The edge of the coin is milled. There were 7,452,100 cupronickel coins and 100,000 silver coins issued.
1977 issue	To celebrate Queen Elizabeth II's Silver Jubilee. Obverse: A portrait of Queen Elizabeth II riding a horse, in a similar style to the 1953 crown celebrating her coronation. The inscription reads ELIZABETH·II DG·REG FD 1977. Reverse: A design showing coronation regalia. The Ampulla and Anointing Spoon used in the Queen's coronation are displayed crowned, and encircled by a floral border. These objects date from the 14th and 12th centuries respectively and have remained in continuous use. Both faces were designed by Arnold Machin. The edge of the coin is milled. There were 37,061,160 cupronickel coins and 377,000 silver coins issued.
1980 issue	To celebrate the eightieth birthday of Queen Elizabeth the Queen Mother. Obverse: The standard portrait of Queen Elizabeth II by Arnold Machin with the inscription D·G·REG·F·D· ELIZABETH II. Reverse: A portrait of the Queen Mother surrounded by a radiating pattern of bows and lions, a pun on her maiden name Bowes-Lyon. The inscription reads: QUEEN ELIZABETH THE QUEEN MOTHER AUGUST 4th 1980. The reverse was designed by Professor Richard Guyatt. Both faces are encircled by dots. The edge of the coin is milled. There were 9,306,000 cupronickel coins and 83,672 silver coins issued.
1981 issue	To celebrate the wedding of Charles, Prince of Wales and Lady Diana Spencer. Obverse: The standard portrait of Queen Elizabeth II by Arnold Machin with the inscription D·G·REG·F·D· ELIZABETH II. Reverse: A profile portrait of Lady Diana Spencer partially covered by a profile portrait of The Prince of Wales, both facing to the left, with the inscription H.R.H. THE PRINCE OF WALES AND LADY DIANA SPENCER 1981. This face was designed by Philip Nathan. Both faces are encircled by dots. The edge of the coin is milled. There were 26,773,600 cupronickel coins and 218,000 silver coins issued.

== Trial coins ==
Before the introduction of the twenty pence coin in 1982, a twenty-five pence denomination was considered. A small number of pattern coins were produced by the Royal Mint for testing, with a similar heptagonal shape to the eventual twenty pence. Around 50 of these trials are estimated to have entered circulation. One example sold in 2024 for £1,700, although this may have been from a 1990s Royal Mint euro coin trial which used the same dies.

== See also ==
- Quarter sovereign – introduced in 2009, it has a nominal value of 25 pence

Preceded by Crown	Crown-sized British coin 1972–1981	Succeeded by Five pounds
