= Crown (British coin) =

British coin introduced in 1707

- Great Britain (1707—1801); United Kingdom (1801–1970)
- Value: 5/— (25 new pence)
- Diameter: 38 mm
- Edge: Milled
- Composition: (1816–1919) 92.5% Ag; (1920–1946) 50% Ag; (1947–1970) Cupronickel
- Years of minting: 1707–1965; 1971–1981 (as decimal 25p piece)

Obverse
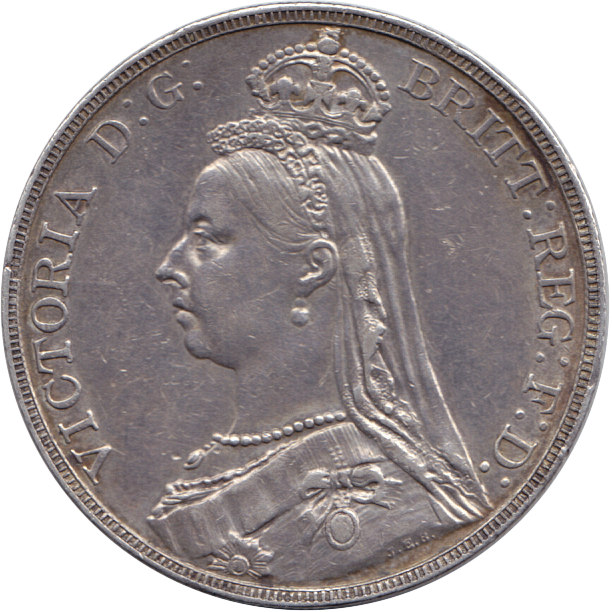
- Design: Profile of the monarch (Queen Victoria "jubilee head" design shown)
- Designer: Joseph Boehm
- Design date: 1887

Reverse
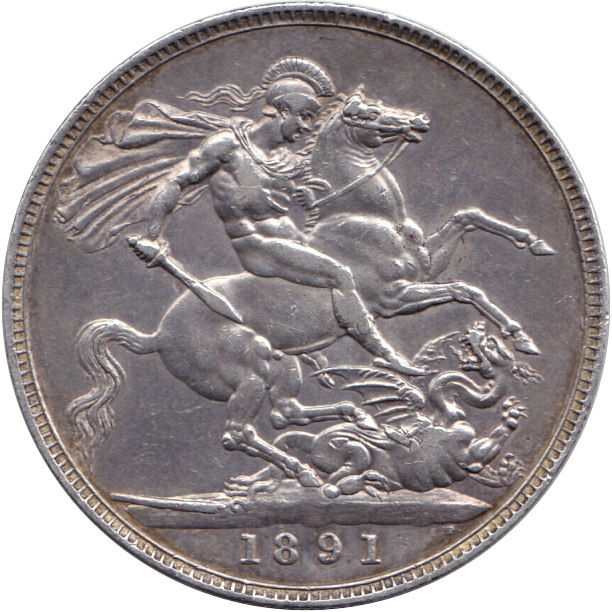
- Design: Various (St George design shown)
- Designer: Benedetto Pistrucci
- Design date: 1817

The crown was a denomination of sterling coinage worth a quarter of one pound (five shillings, or 60 old pence; equivalent to 25 new pence). The crown was first issued during the reign of Edward VI, as part of the coinage of the Kingdom of England.

Always a heavy, silver-coloured coin weighing around one ounce, during the 19th and 20th centuries the crown declined from being a real means of exchange to being a coin rarely spent, and minted for commemorative purposes only. Unlike in some territories of the British Empire (such as Jamaica), in the UK the crown was never replaced as circulating currency by a five-shilling banknote.

"Decimal" crowns (25p pieces), which have the same face value as the crown, were minted a few times after decimalisation of the British currency in 1971. However, five pound coins, issued since 1990, sometimes referred to as a 'crown', have a face value of five pounds.

== History ==
The coin's origins lie in the English silver crown, one of many silver coins that appeared in various countries from the 16th century onwards (most famously the Spanish piece of eight), all of similar size and weight (approx 38mm diameter, 25g fine silver) and thus interchangeable in international trade. The Kingdom of England also minted gold Crowns until early in the reign of Charles II.

The dies for all gold and silver coins of Queen Anne and King George I were engraved by John Croker, a migrant originally from Dresden in the Duchy of Saxony.

The British silver crown was always a large coin, and from the 19th century it did not circulate well. However, crowns were usually struck in a new monarch's coronation year, from George IV to Elizabeth II in 1953, with the exceptions of George V and Edward VIII.

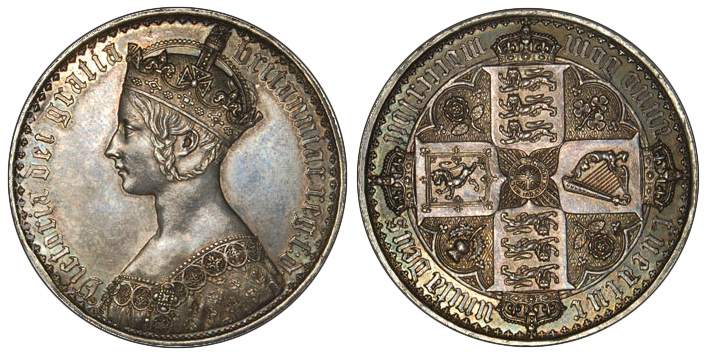
"Gothic" crown of Queen Victoria (1847). The coin had a mintage of just 8,000 and was produced to celebrate the Gothic revival.

The King George V "wreath" crowns struck from 1927 until 1936 (excluding 1935 when the more common "rocking horse" crown was minted to commemorate the King's Silver Jubilee) depict a wreath on the reverse of the coin and were struck in very low numbers. Generally struck late in the year and intended to be purchased as Christmas gifts, they were generally kept rather than circulated. The 1927 "wreath" crowns were struck as proofs only (15,030 minted) and the 1934 coin had a mintage of just 932.

With their large size, many of the later coins were primarily commemoratives. The 1951 issue was for the Festival of Britain, and was only struck in proof condition. The 1953 crown was issued to celebrate the coronation of Queen Elizabeth II, while the 1960 issue (which carried the same reverse design as the previous crown in 1953) commemorated the British Exhibition in New York. The 1965 issue carried the image of Winston Churchill on the reverse. According to the Standard Catalogue of coins, 19,640,000 of this coin were minted, although intended as collectable pieces the large mintage and lack of precious metal content means these coins are effectively worthless today. Production of the Churchill crown began on 11 October 1965, and stopped in the summer of 1966.

The crown coin was nicknamed the dollar. In 1940, an agreement with the US pegged the Pound sterling to the US dollar at a rate of £1 = US$4.03. This meaning of "dollar" is not to be confused with the British trade dollar that circulated in East Asia.

In 2014, a new world record price was achieved for a milled silver crown. The coin was unique, issued as a pattern by engraver Thomas Simon in 1663 and nicknamed the "Reddite Crown". It was presented to Charles II as the new crown piece, but ultimately rejected in favour of the Roettiers Brothers' design. Auctioneers Spink & Son of London sold the coin on 27 March 2014 for £396,000 including commission.

All pre-decimal crowns from 1818 on remain legal tender with a face value of 25p.

=== Decimal crowns ===
After decimalisation on 15 February 1971, the 25-pence coin was introduced as a replacement for the crown as a commemorative coin. These were legal tender and were made with large mintages.

Further issues continued to be minted, initially with a value of twenty-five pence (with no face value shown). From 1990, the face value of new crown coins was raised to five pounds.

Preceded by English crown	Crown; 1707–1965	Succeeded by Twenty–five pence

== Changing values ==
The legal tender value of the crown remained as five shillings from 1544 to 1965. However, for most of this period there was no denominational designation or "face value" mark of value displayed on the coin. From 1927 to 1939, the word "CROWN" appears, and from 1951 to 1960 this was changed to "FIVE SHILLINGS". Coins minted since 1818 remain legal tender with a face value of 25 pence.

Although all "normal" issues since 1951 have been composed of cupro-nickel, special proof versions have been produced for sale to collectors, and as gift items, in silver, gold, and occasionally platinum.

The fact that gold £5 crowns are now produced means that there are two different strains of five pound gold coins, namely crowns and what are now termed "quintuple sovereigns" for want of a more concise term.

Numismatically, the term "crown-sized" is used generically to describe large silver or cupro-nickel coins of about 40 mm in diameter. Most Commonwealth countries still issue crown-sized coins for sale to collectors.

New Zealand's original fifty-cent pieces, and Australia's previously round but now dodecagonal fifty-cent piece, although valued at five shillings in predecimal accounting, are all smaller than the standard silver crown pieces issued by those countries (and the UK). They were in fact similarly sized to the predecimal half crown (worth two shillings and sixpence).

== Composition ==
For silver crowns, the grade of silver adhered to the long-standing standard (established in the 12th century by Henry II) – the Sterling Silver standard of 92.5% silver and 7.5% copper. This was a harder-wearing alloy, yet it was still a rather high grade of silver. It went some way towards discouraging the practice of "clipping", though this practice was further discouraged and largely eliminated with the introduction of the milled edge seen on coins today.

In a debasement process which took effect in 1920, the silver content of all British coins was reduced from 92.5% to 50%, with a portion of the remainder consisting of manganese, which caused the coins to tarnish to a very dark colour after they had been in circulation for a significant period. Silver was eliminated altogether in 1947, with the move to a composition of cupro-nickel – except for proof issues, which returned to the pre-1920 92.5% silver composition.

Since the Great Recoinage of 1816, a crown has, as a general rule, had a diameter of 38.61 millimetres (1.520 in), and weighed 28.276 grams (defined as 10/11 troy ounce).

== Mintages and Varieties ==
Monarch	Year	Number minted	Detail	Composition*
Edward VI	As 5/- (60d; quarter sovereign)			
Edward VI	1551	N/A	First sterling silver crown coin	0.925 silver
Edward VI	1552	N/A	Crown	0.925 silver
Edward VI	1553	N/A	Crown	0.925 silver
Elizabeth I	1601	N/A	'7th issue' Crown (others were struck in gold)	0.925 silver
Elizabeth I	1602	N/A	'7th issue' Crown (others were struck in gold)	0.925 silver
James I	1620-1624 (No dates)	N/A	'3rd coinage' Crown	0.925 silver
Charles I	1625-1649 (No dates)	N/A	Crown	0.925 silver
Charles I	1644	app. 100	'Oxford' Crown	0.925 silver
Charles I	1645	N/A	'Exeter' Crown	0.925 silver
Oliver Cromwell	1658	N/A	'8 over 7' Crown	0.925 silver
Charles II	1662	N/A	'1st Bust' Crown	0.925 silver
Charles II	1663	N/A	'1st Bust' Crown	0.925 silver
Charles II	1664	N/A	'2nd Bust' Crown	0.925 silver
Charles II	1665	N/A	'2nd Bust' Crown	0.925 silver
Charles II	1666	N/A	'2nd Bust' Crown	0.925 silver
Charles II	1671	N/A	'3rd Bust' Crown	0.925 silver
Charles II	1672	N/A	'3rd Bust' Crown	0.925 silver
Charles II	1673	N/A	'3rd Bust' Crown	0.925 silver
Charles II	1674	N/A	'3rd Bust' Crown	0.925 silver
Charles II	1675	N/A	'3rd Bust' Crown	0.925 silver
Charles II	1676	N/A	'3rd Bust' Crown	0.925 silver
Charles II	1677	N/A	'3rd Bust' Crown	0.925 silver
Charles II	1678	N/A	'3rd Bust' Crown	0.925 silver
Charles II	1679	N/A	'3rd Bust' Crown	0.925 silver
Charles II	1679	N/A	'4th Bust' Crown	0.925 silver
Charles II	1680	N/A	'3rd Bust' Crown	0.925 silver
Charles II	1680	N/A	'4th Bust' Crown	0.925 silver
Charles II	1681	N/A	'4th Bust' Crown	0.925 silver
Charles II	1682	N/A	'4th Bust' Crown	0.925 silver
Charles II	1683	N/A	'4th Bust' Crown	0.925 silver
Charles II	1684	N/A	'4th Bust' Crown	0.925 silver
James II	1686	N/A	'1st Bust' Crown	0.925 silver
James II	1687	N/A	'2nd Bust' Crown	0.925 silver
James II	1688	N/A	'2nd Bust' Crown	0.925 silver
William and Mary	1691	N/A	'1st Bust' Crown	0.925 silver
William and Mary	1692	N/A	'1st Bust' Crown	0.925 silver
William III	1695	N/A	'1st Bust' Crown	0.925 silver
William III	1696	N/A	'1st Bust' Crown	0.925 silver
William III	1696	N/A	'2nd Bust' Crown	0.925 silver
William III	1696	N/A	'3rd Bust, 1st Harp' Crown	0.925 silver
William III	1697	N/A	'3rd Bust, 2nd Harp' Crown	0.925 silver
William III	1700	N/A	'3rd Bust, 3rd Harp' Crown	0.925 silver
Anne	1703	N/A	'Pre-Union' Crown	0.925 silver
Anne	1705	N/A	'Pre-Union' Crown	0.925 silver
Anne	1706	N/A	'Pre-Union' Crown	0.925 silver
Anne	1707	N/A	'Pre-Union' Crown	0.925 silver
Anne	1707	N/A	'2nd Bust' Crown	0.925 silver
Anne	1708	N/A	'2nd Bust' Crown	0.925 silver
Anne	1713	N/A	'3rd Bust' Crown	0.925 silver
George I	1716	N/A	Crown	0.925 silver
George I	1718	N/A	Crown	0.925 silver
George I	1720	N/A	Crown	0.925 silver
George I	1723	N/A	Crown	0.925 silver
George I	1726	N/A	Crown	0.925 silver
George II	1743	N/A	'Older Bust' Crown	0.925 silver
George II	1746	100	'Older Bust' Crown	0.925 silver
George II	1746	N/A	'LIMA' Crown, struck using captured Spanish silver in Lima, Peru	0.925 silver
George II	1750	N/A	'Older Bust' Crown	0.925 silver
George II	1751	N/A	'Older Bust' Crown	0.925 silver
George III	1818	155,200	Crown	0.925 silver
George III	1819	683,400	Crown	0.925 silver
George III	1820	448,200	Crown	0.925 silver
George IV	1821	438,000	Crown	0.925 silver
George IV	1822	125,000	Crown	0.925 silver
William IV	1831	100 (proof only)	Crown	0.925 silver
William IV	1832	N/A (pattern tests only)	Crown	lead
William IV	1834	<10 (Not for circulation)	Crown	0.925 silver
Victoria	1839	N/A (Not for circulation)	'Young Head' Crown	0.925 silver
Victoria	1844	94,200	'Young Head' Crown	0.925 silver
Victoria	1845	159,100	'Young Head' Crown	0.925 silver
Victoria	1847	140,900	'Young Head' Crown	0.925 silver
Victoria	1847	8,000	'Gothic' Crown	0.925 silver
Victoria	1853	460 (proof only)	'Gothic' Crown	0.925 silver
Victoria	1887	173,500	'Jubilee Head' Crown	0.925 silver
Victoria	1887	1,000 (proof only)	'Jubilee Head' Crown	0.925 silver
Victoria	1888	131,800	'Jubilee Head' Crown	0.925 silver
Victoria	1889	1,807,200	'Jubilee Head' Crown	0.925 silver
Victoria	1890	997,800	'Jubilee Head' Crown	0.925 silver
Victoria	1891	566,300	'Jubilee Head' Crown	0.925 silver
Victoria	1892	451,300	'Jubilee Head' Crown	0.925 silver
Victoria	1893	497,800	'Old Head' Crown	0.925 silver
Victoria	1893	1,300 (proof only)	'Old Head' Crown	0.925 silver
Victoria	1894	144,900	'Old Head' Crown	0.925 silver
Victoria	1895	252,800	'Old Head' Crown	0.925 silver
Victoria	1896	317,500	'Old Head' Crown	0.925 silver
Victoria	1897	262,100	'Old Head' Crown	0.925 silver
Victoria	1898	161,400	'Old Head' Crown	0.925 silver
Victoria	1899	166,300	'Old Head' Crown	0.925 silver
Victoria	1900	353,300 (LXIII and LXIV)	'Old Head' Crown	0.925 silver
Edward VII	1902	256,020	Coronation	0.925 silver
George V	1927	15,030 (proof only)	'Wreath' Crown	0.500 silver
George V	1928	9,034	'Wreath' Crown	0.500 silver
George V	1929	4,994	'Wreath' Crown	0.500 silver
George V	1930	4,847	'Wreath' Crown	0.500 silver
George V	1931	4,056	'Wreath' Crown	0.500 silver
George V	1932	2,395	'Wreath' Crown	0.500 silver
George V	1933	7,132	'Wreath' Crown	0.500 silver
George V	1934	932	'Wreath' Crown	0.500 silver
George V	1935	714,769	George V and Queen Mary Silver Jubilee	0.500 silver
George V	1936	2,473	'Wreath' Crown	0.500 silver
George VI	1937	418,699	Coronation	0.500 silver
George VI	1951	1,983,540	Festival of Britain	Cu/Ni
Elizabeth II	1953	5,962,621	Coronation	Cu/Ni
Elizabeth II	1960	1,024,038	British Exhibition in New York	Cu/Ni
Elizabeth II	1965	19,640,000	Death of Sir Winston Churchill	Cu/Ni
Elizabeth II	As 25p (quarter sovereign)			
Elizabeth II	1972	7,452,100	Queen Elizabeth II 25th Wedding Anniversary	Cu/Ni
Elizabeth II	1977	37,061,160	Queen Elizabeth II Silver Jubilee	Cu/Ni
Elizabeth II	1980	9,306,000	The Queen Mother's 80th Birthday	Cu/Ni
Elizabeth II	1981	26,773,600	Charles and Diana Wedding	Cu/Ni
Elizabeth II	For crowns minted from 1990, which have a value of £5, see here.			
Charles III	These crowns have a value of £5: see here.			

- The specifications for composition refer to the standard circulation versions. Proof versions continue to be minted in Sterling silver.

== Gallery ==
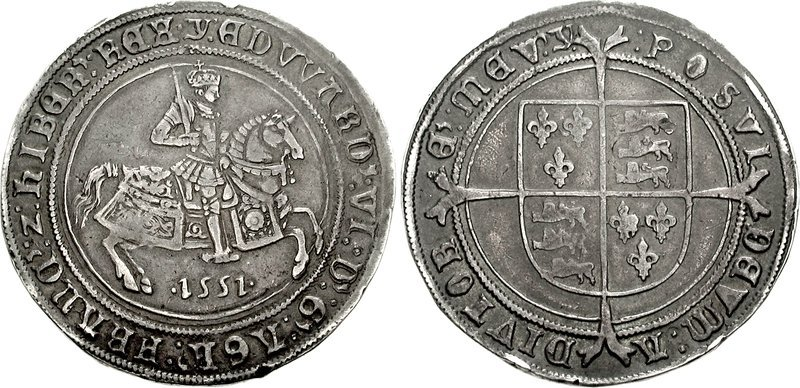
Crown of Edward VI

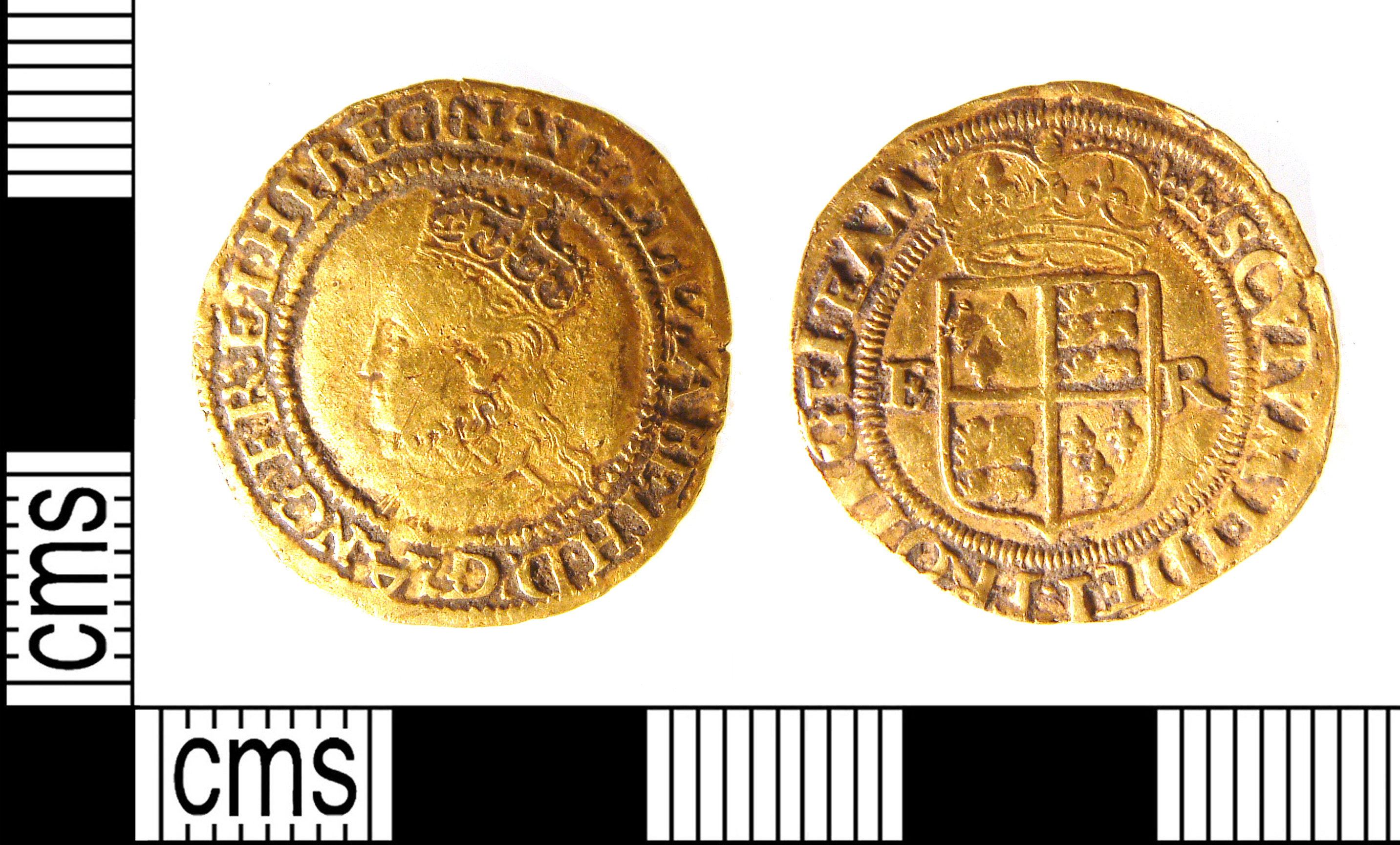
Gold crown of Elizabeth I (c. 1561–1582)

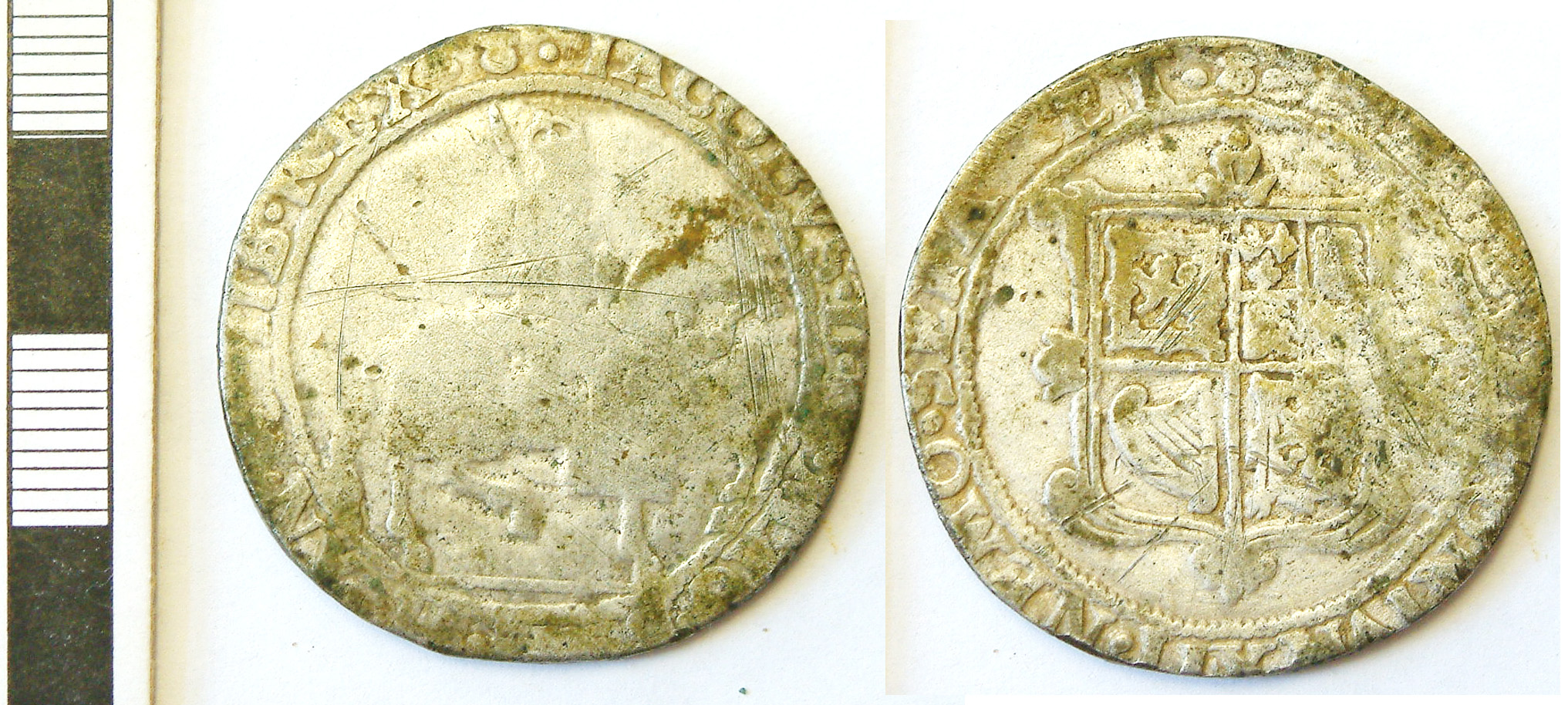
Crown of James I and VI (c. 1619–1625)

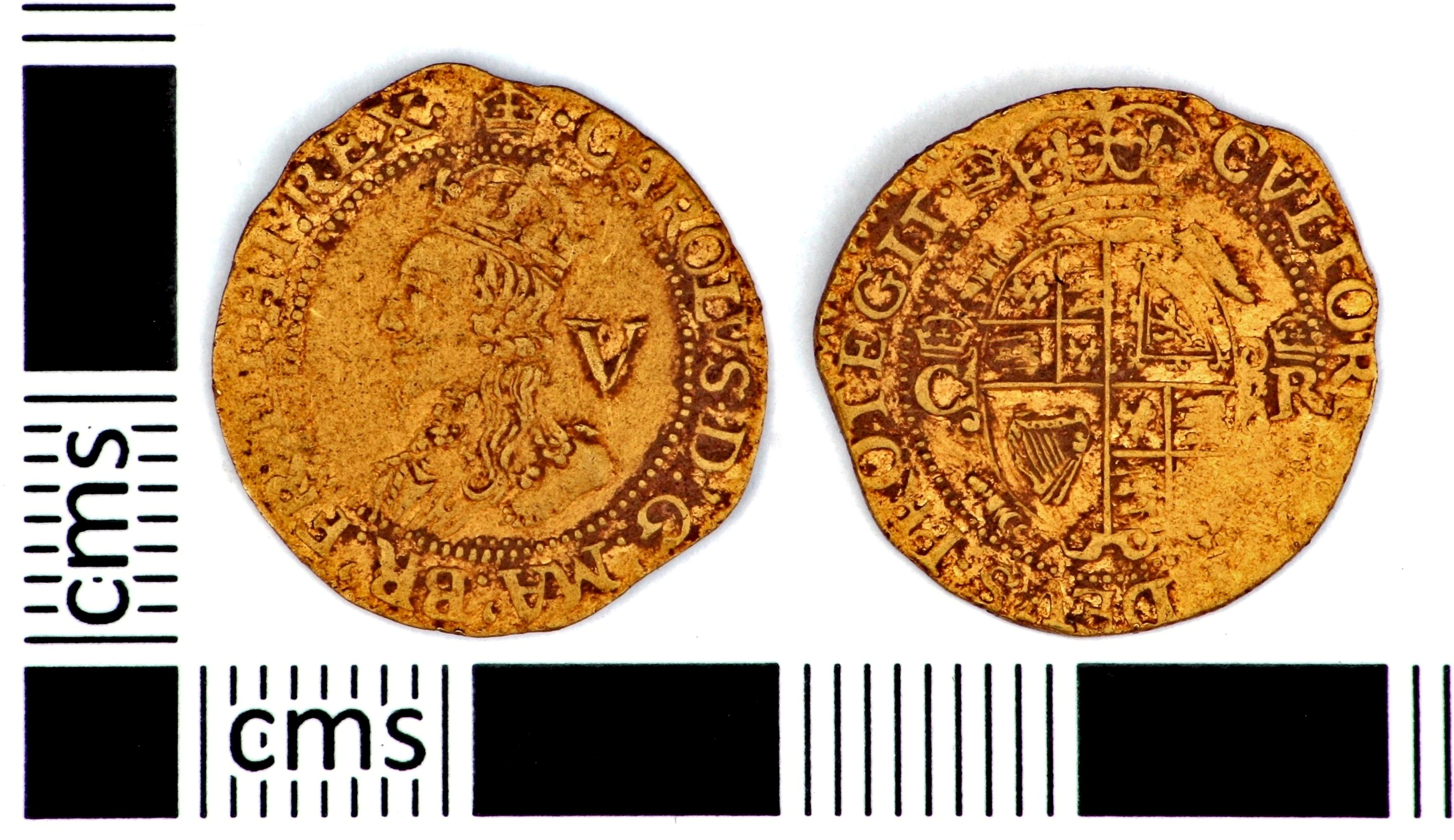
Crown of Charles I

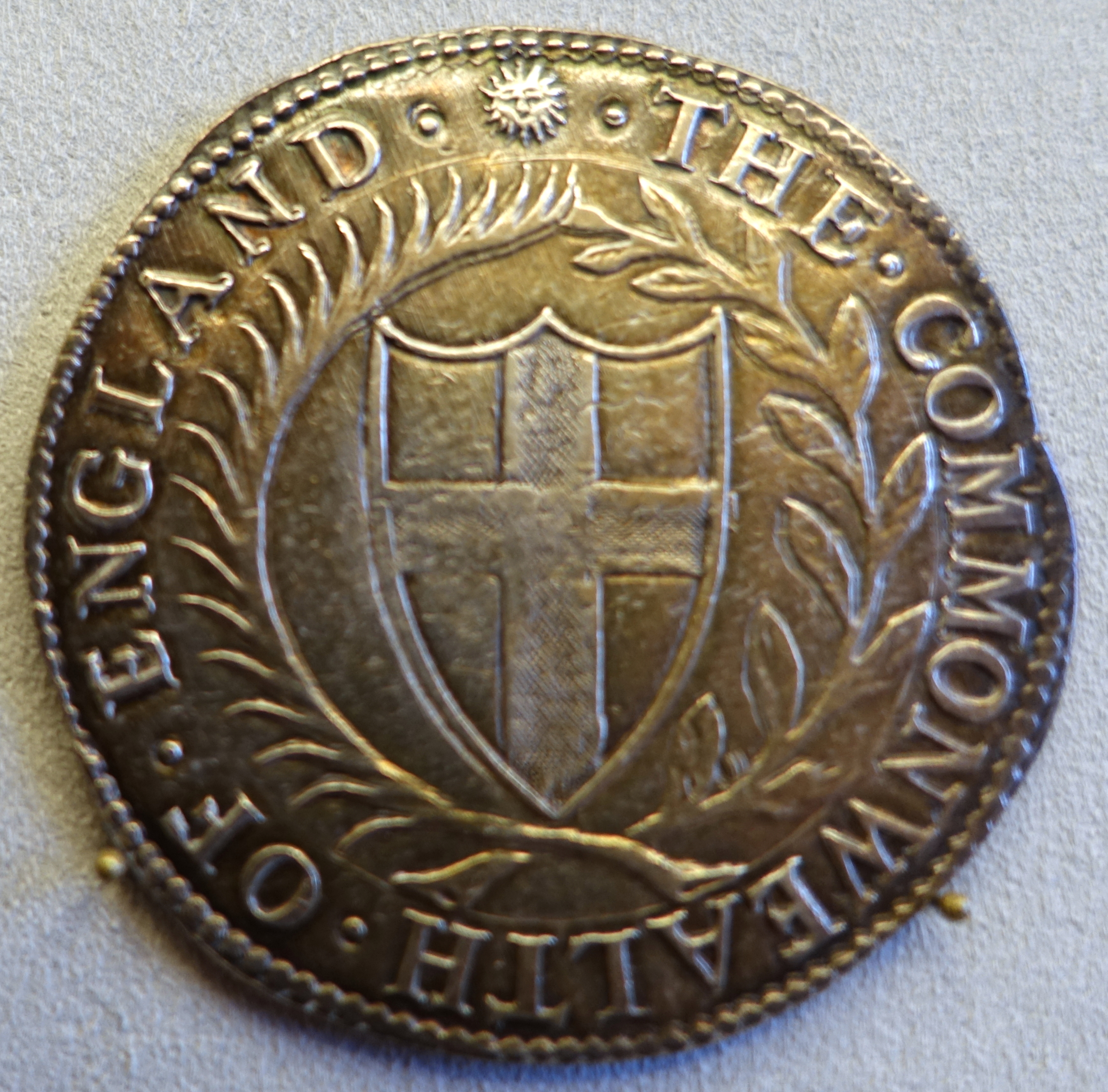
Crown of Oliver Cromwell (1649)

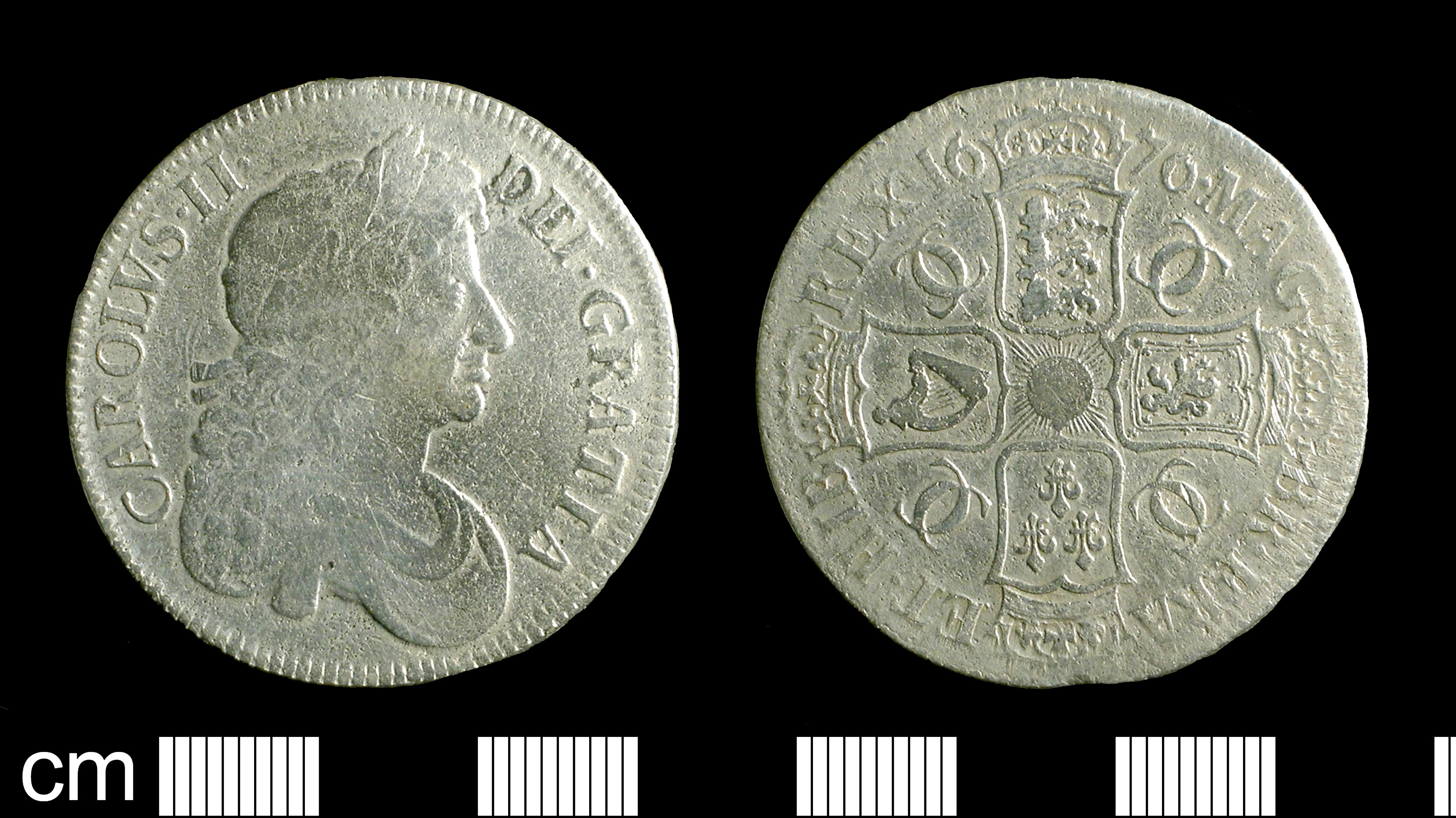
Crown of Charles II (1676)

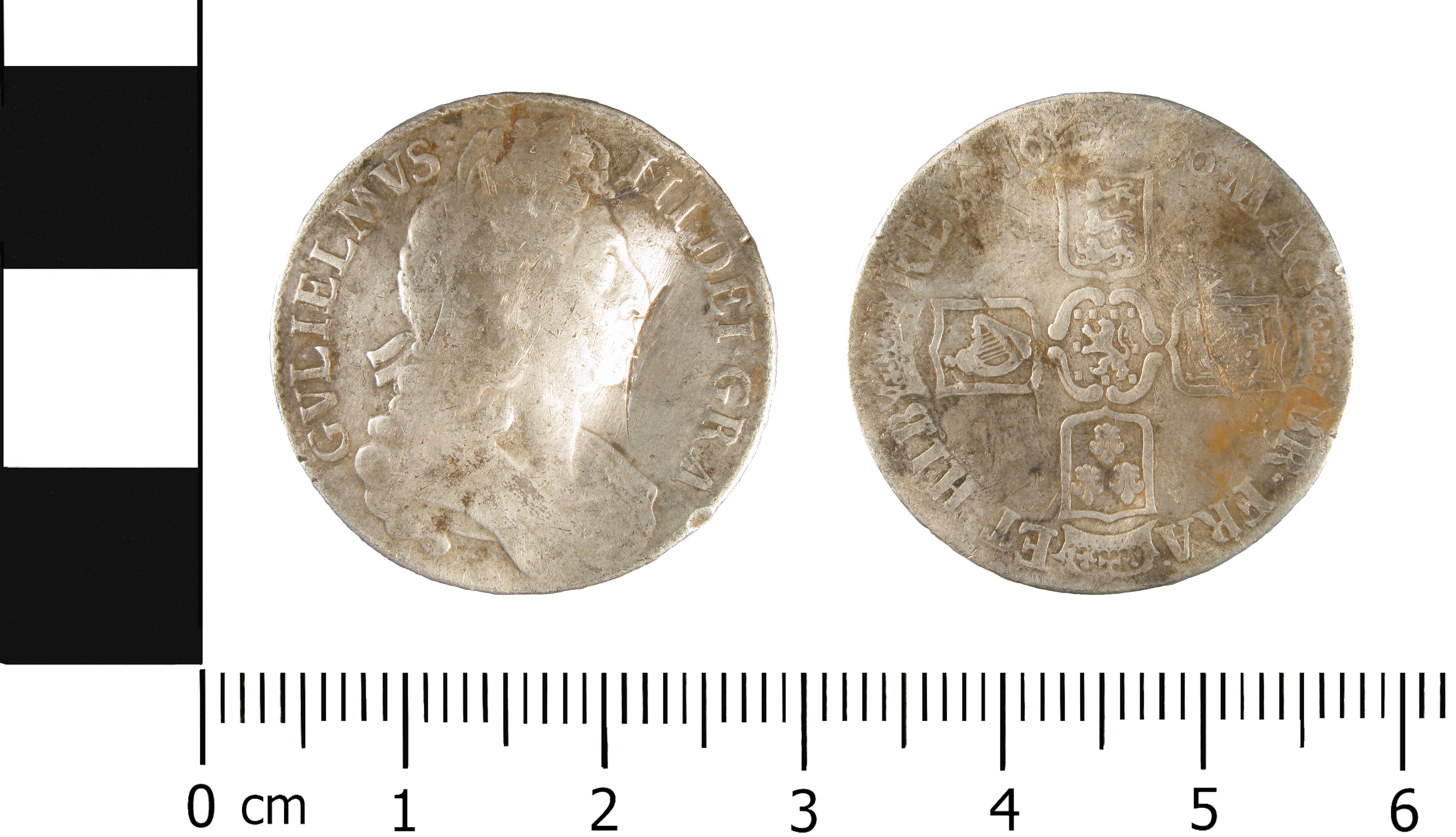
Crown of William III (1696)

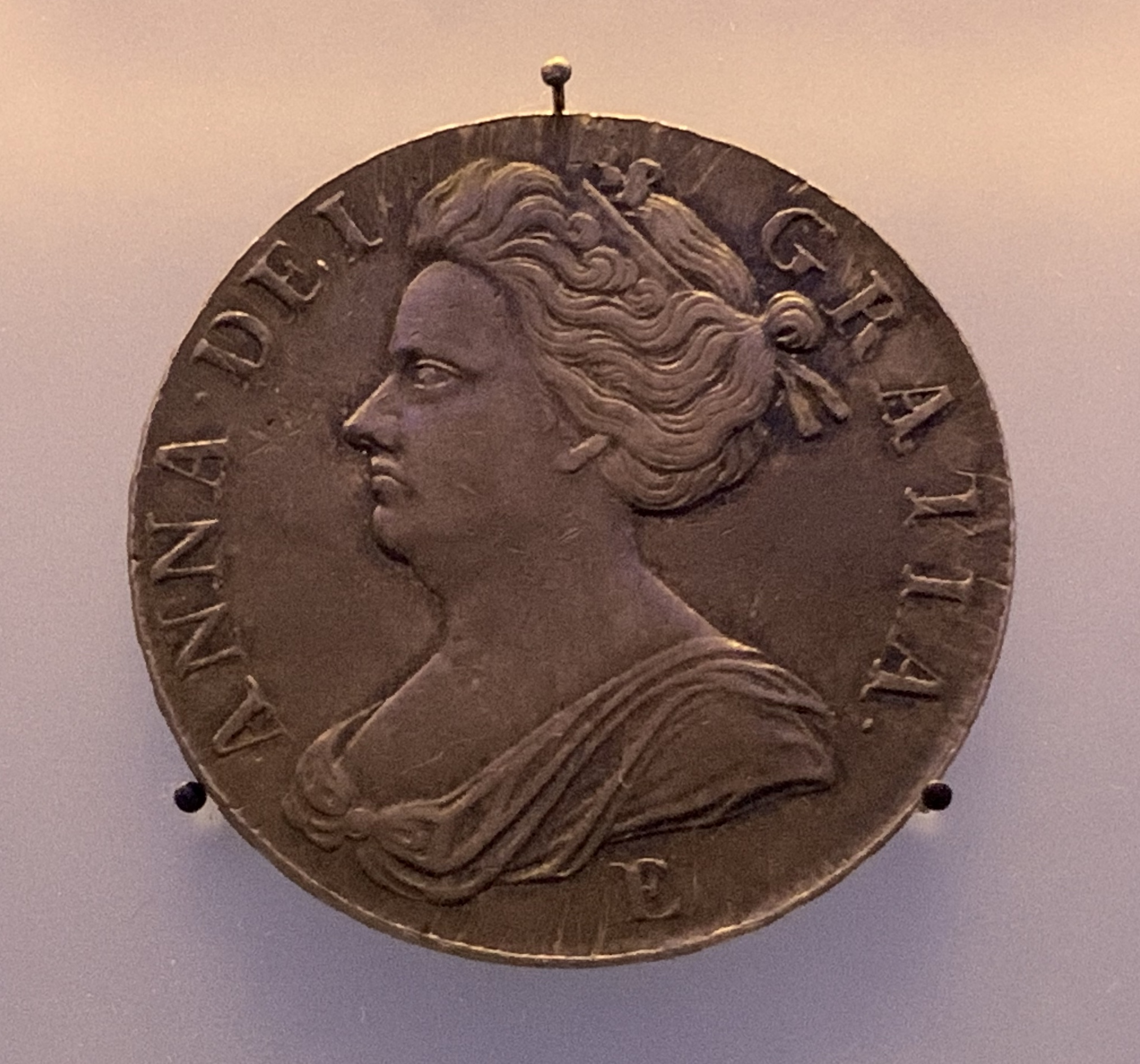
Crown of Queen Anne

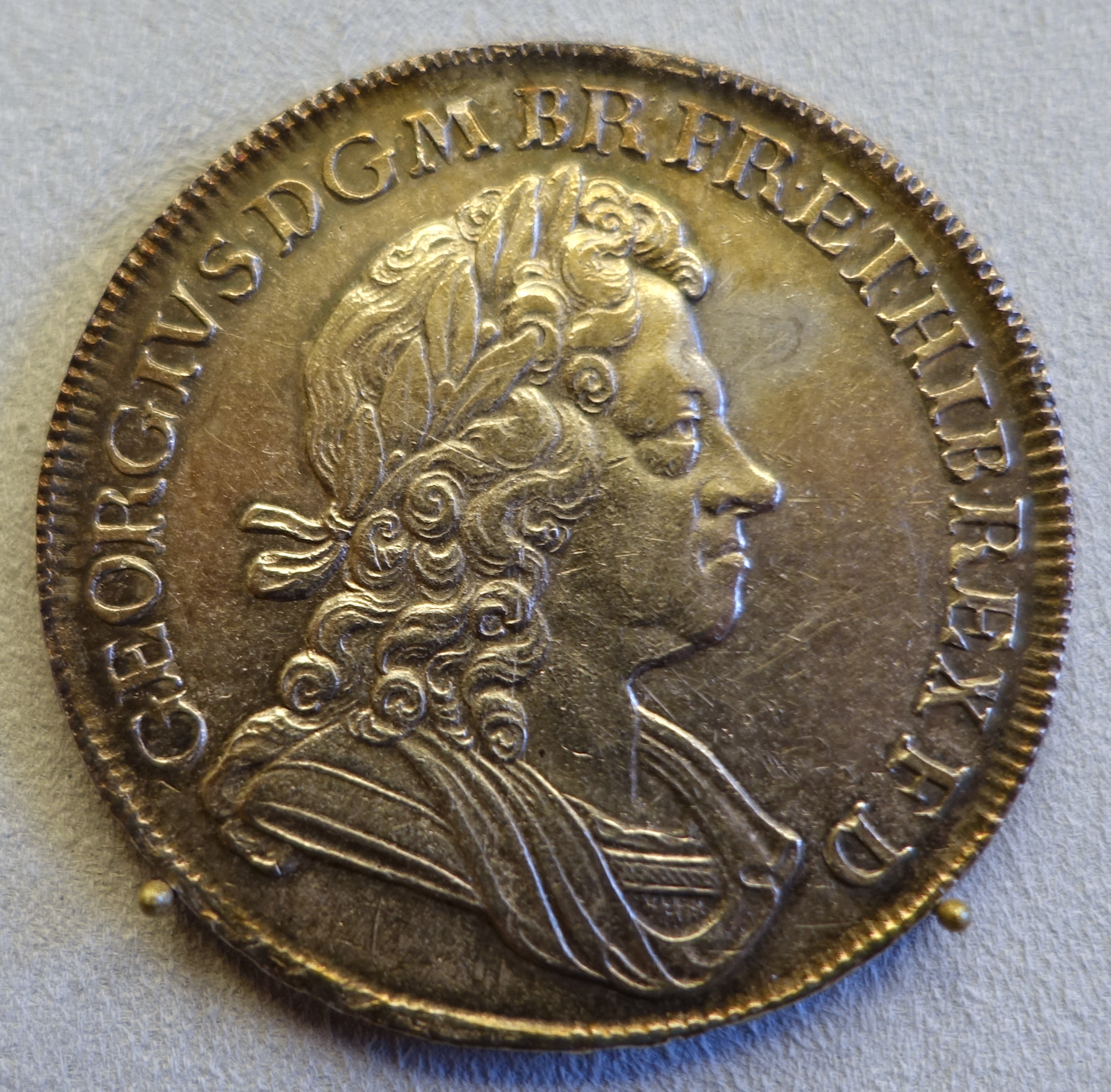
Crown of George I

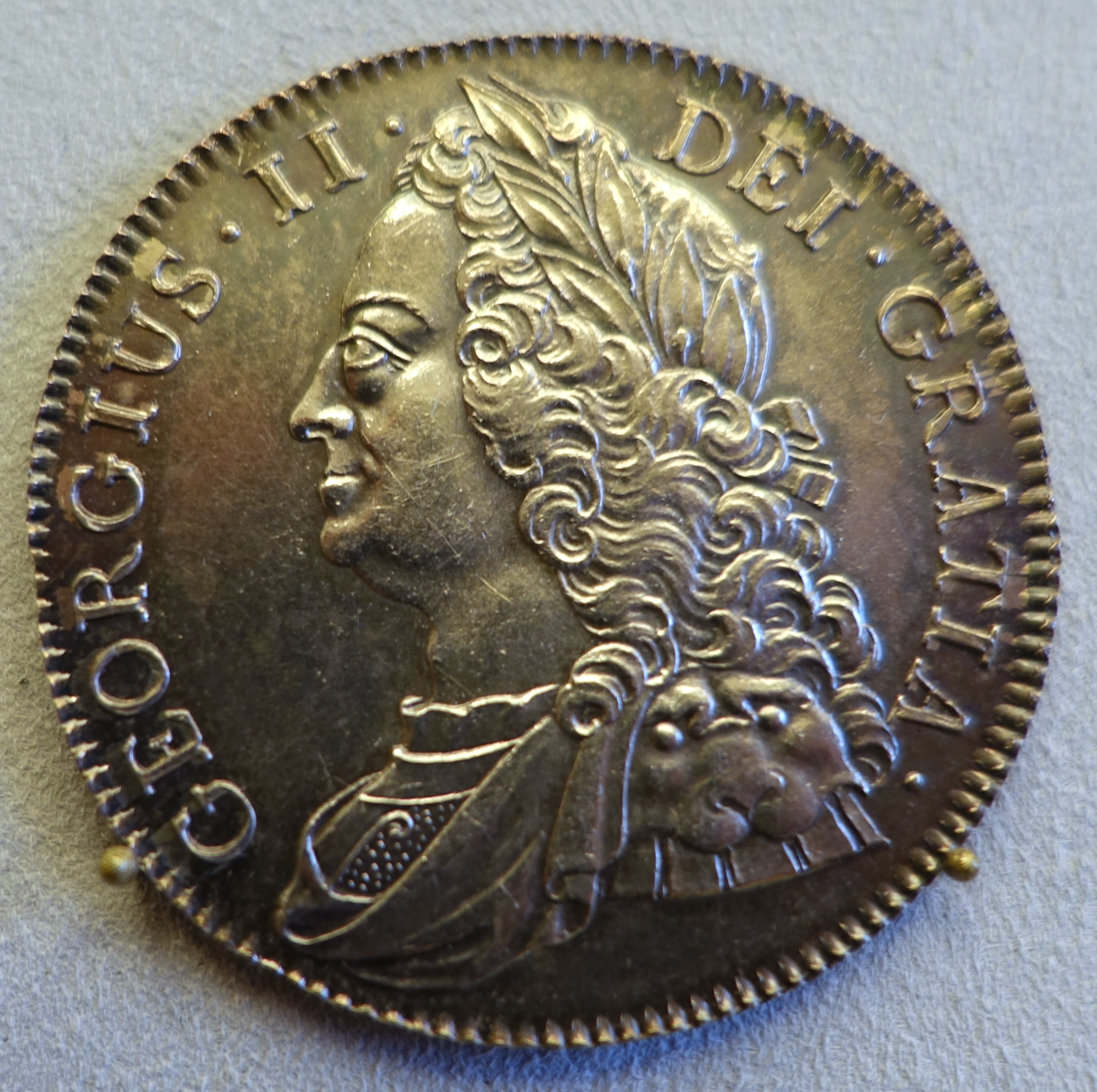
Crown of George II (1743)

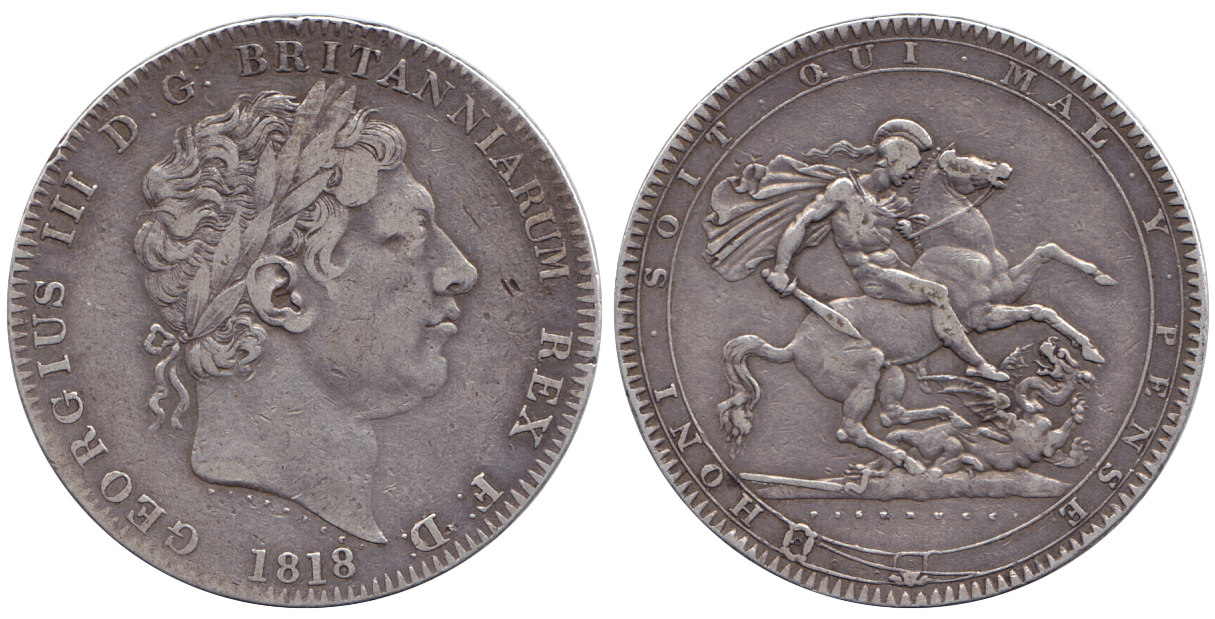
Crown of George III (1818)

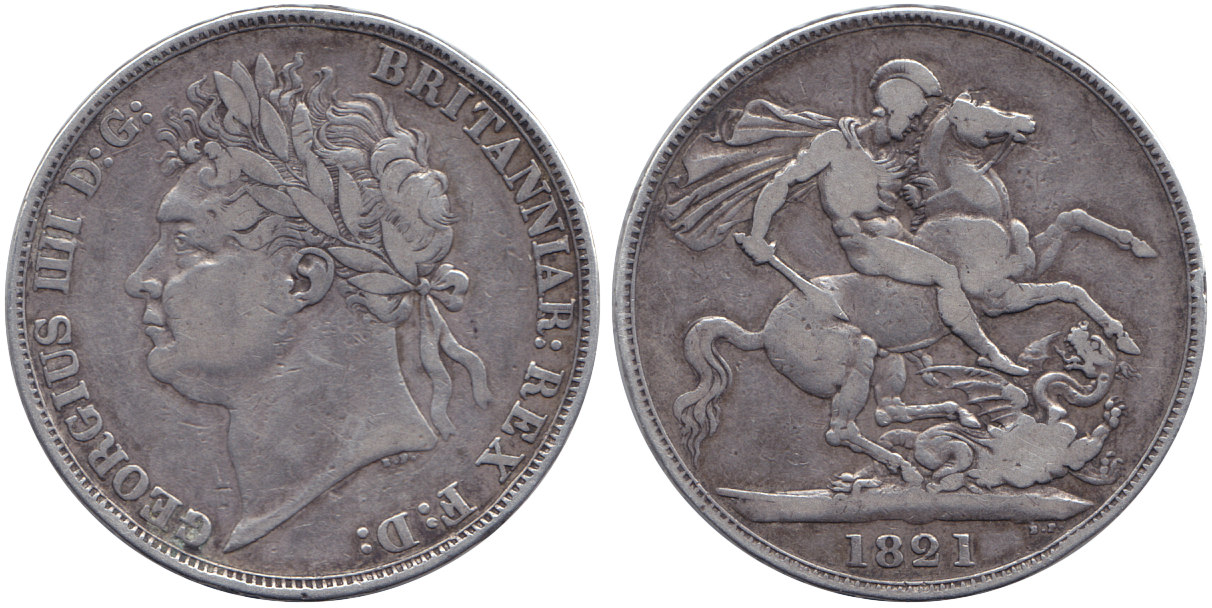
Crown of George IV (1821)

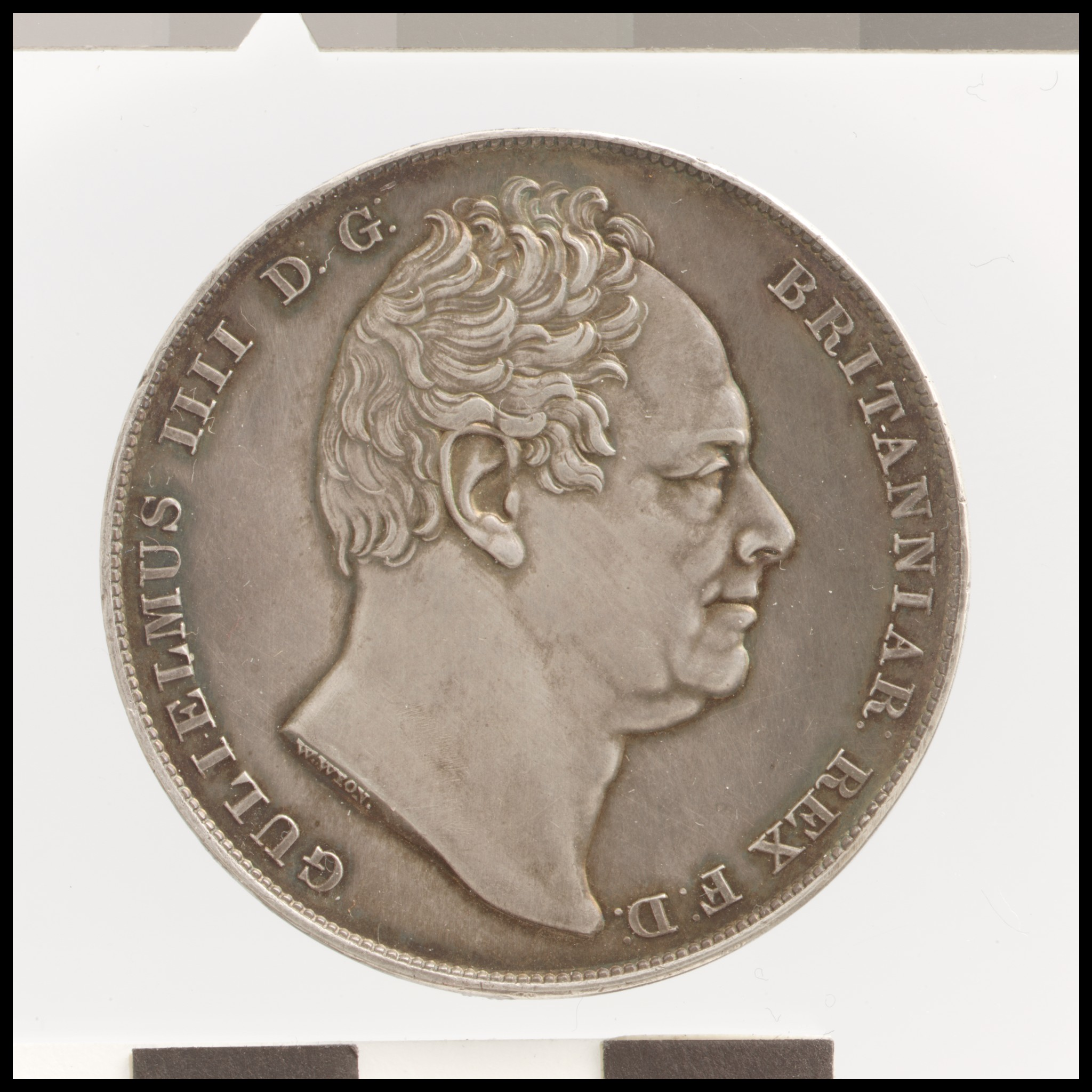
Crown of William IV (1831)

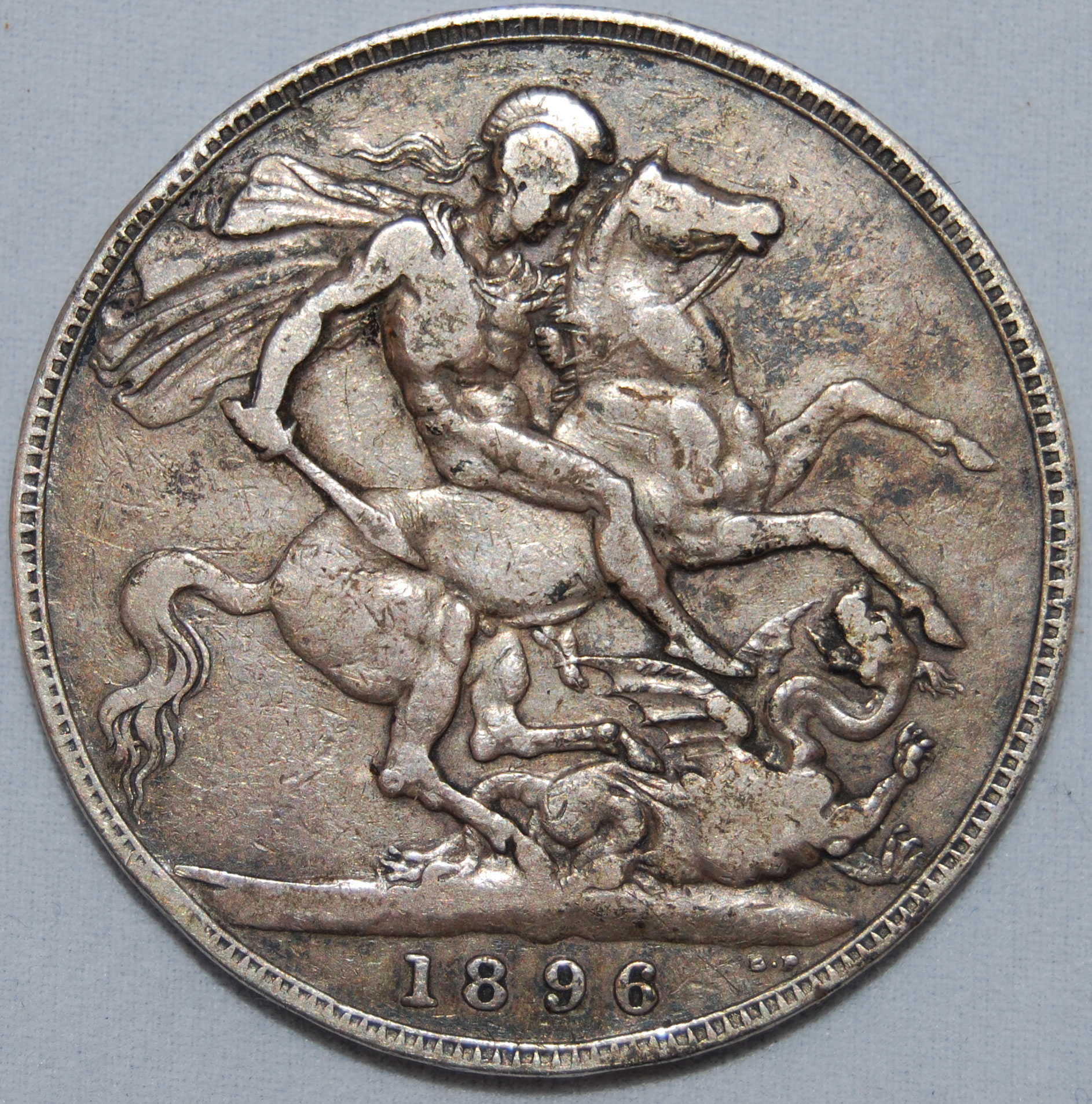
1896 'old head' Queen Victoria Crown

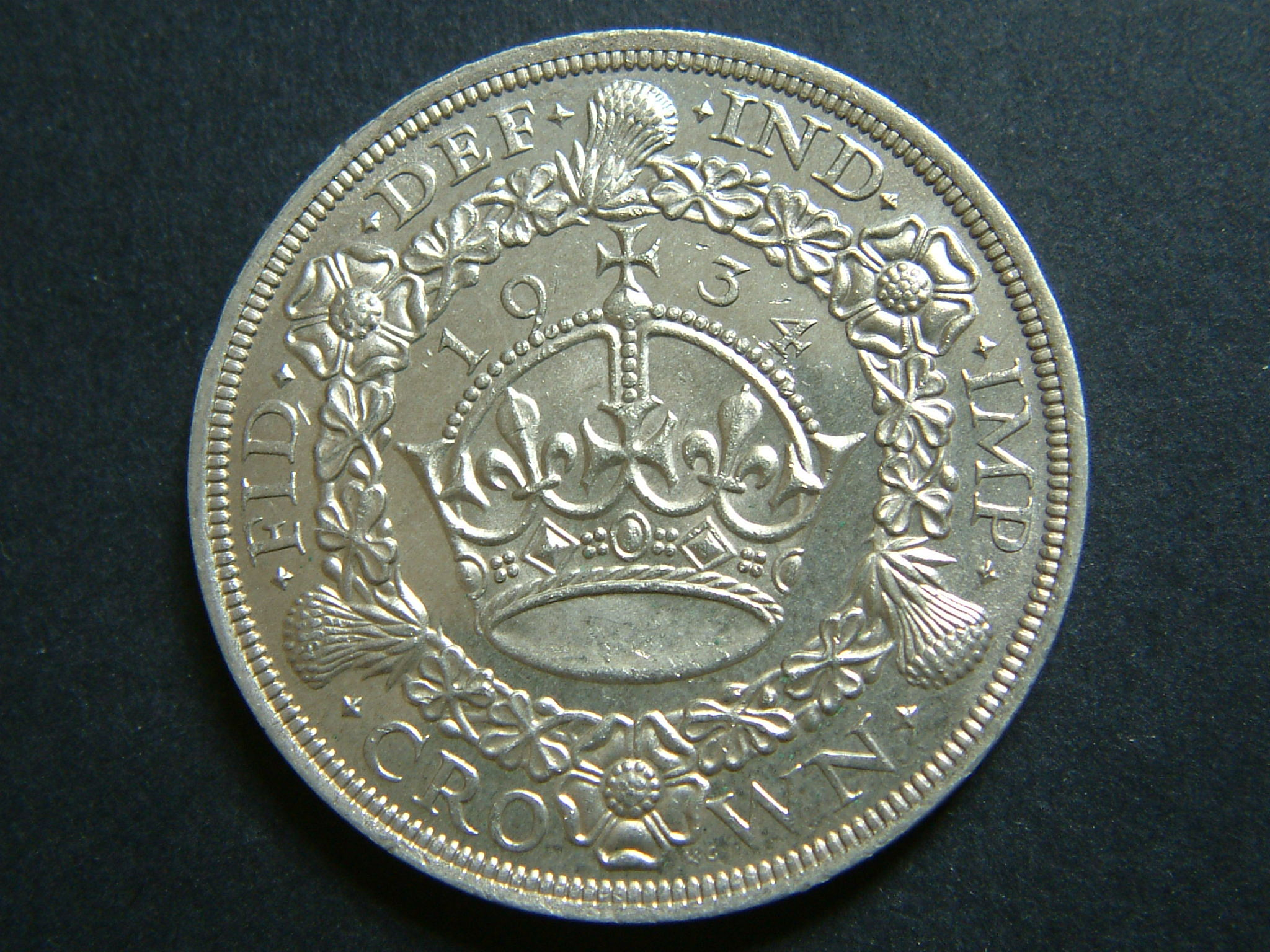
The 1934 George V 'Wreath' Crown

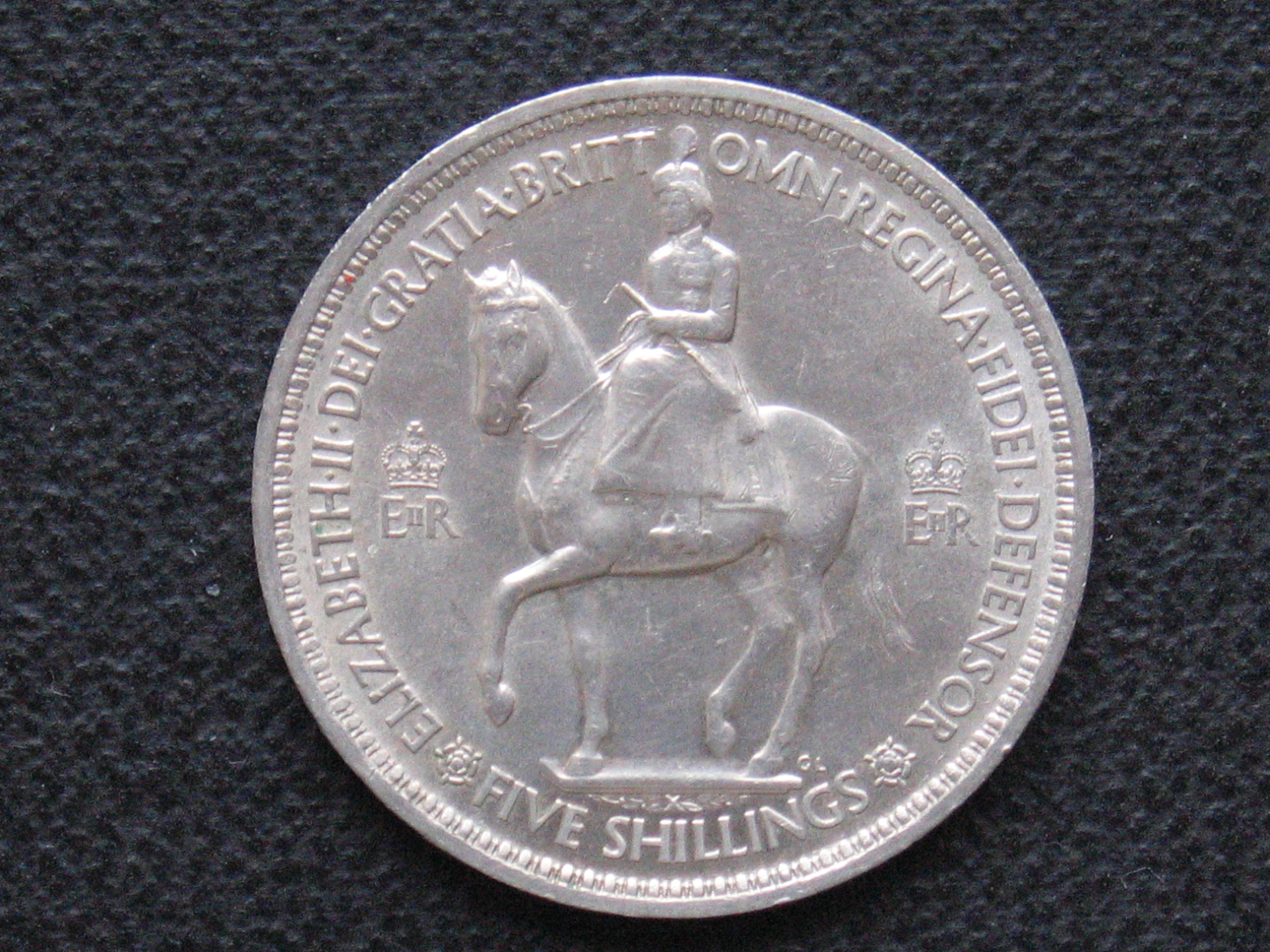
The 1953 Coronation Crown, obverse

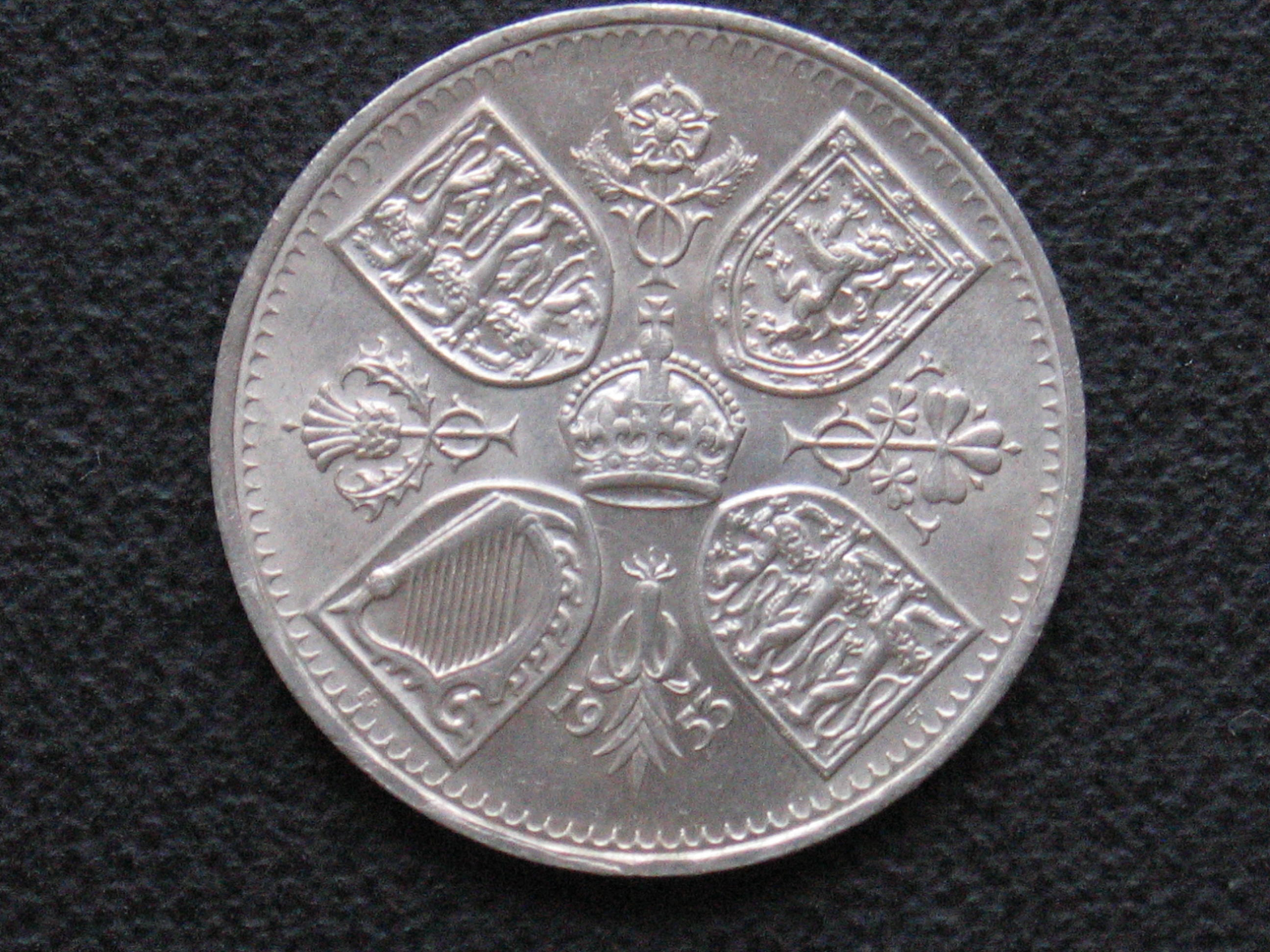
The 1953 Coronation Crown, reverse

== Quarter sovereign ==
In 1853, the Royal Mint had produced two patterns for a gold 5-shilling coin for circulation use, one denominated as five shillings and the other as a quarter sovereign, but this coin never went into production, in part due to concerns about the small size of the coin and likely wear in circulation. The quarter sovereign was introduced in 2009 as a bullion coin.
