= Bethnal Green tube station =

London Underground station

Bethnal Green
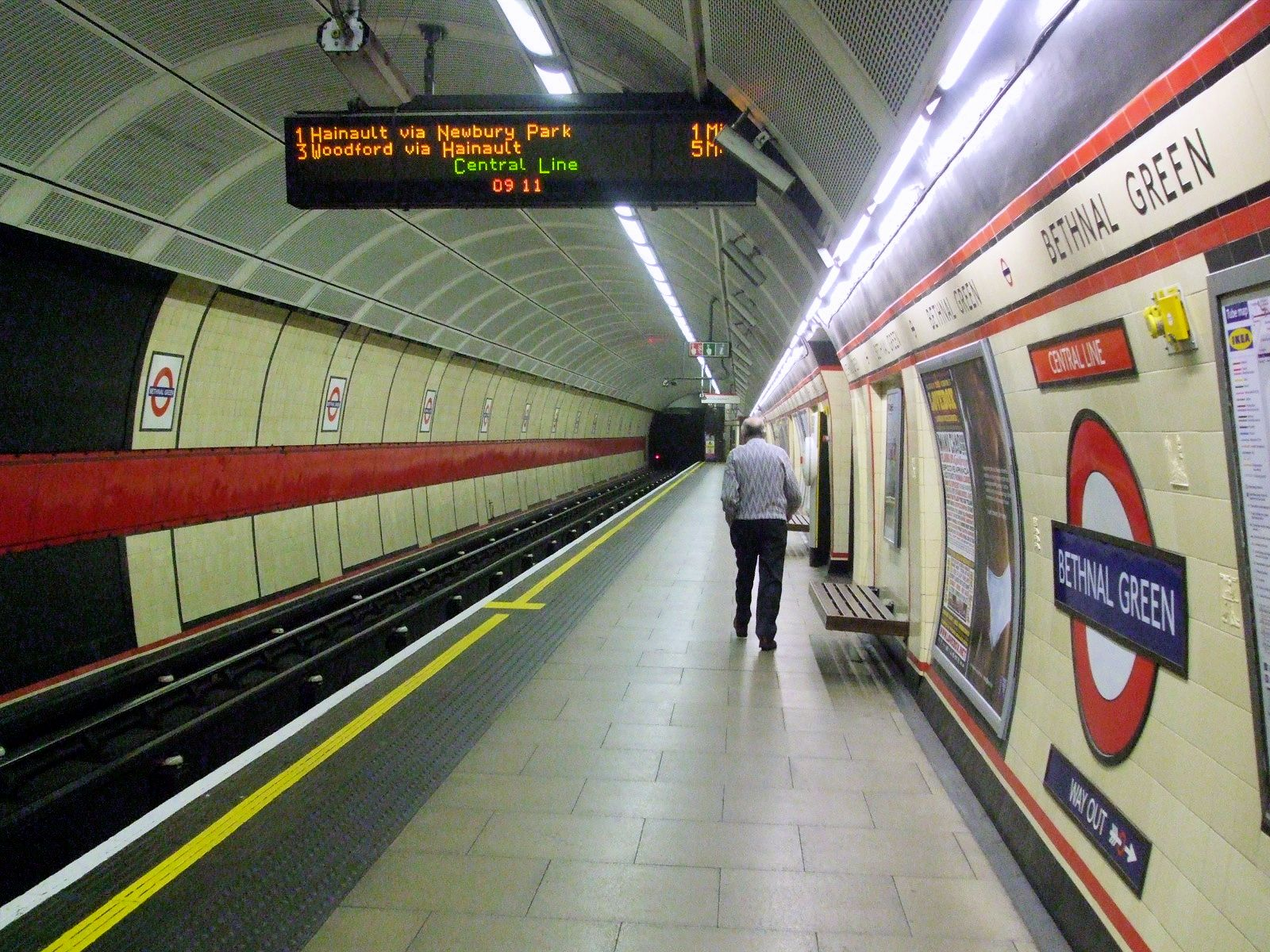
- The Central line eastbound platform
- Interactive map of Bethnal Green

General information
- Location: Bethnal Green
- Local authority: London Borough of Tower Hamlets
- Managed by: London Underground
- Owner: Transport for London
- Number of platforms: 2
- Fare zone: 2

London Underground annual entry and exit
- 2021: ▼6.32 million
- 2022: ▲10.20 million
- 2023: ▼10.18 million
- 2024: ▼9.69 million
- 2025: ▼9.21 million

Railway companies
- Original company: London Passenger Transport Board

Key dates
- 4 December 1946: Station opened

Other information
- External links: TfL station info page
- Coordinates: 51°31′38″N 0°03′20″W

Bethnal Green (/ˈbɛθnəl ˈɡriːn/) is a London Underground station in Bethnal Green, east London, England. It is on the Central line between Liverpool Street and Mile End stations¿ It is open 24 hours on a Friday and Saturday, as part of the Night Tube service. The station was opened as part of the long planned Central line eastern extension on 4 December 1946.

It was used previously as an air-raid shelter. On 3 March 1943, 173 people, including 62 children, were killed in a crush while attempting to enter the shelter; it was believed to be the incident with the largest loss of civilian life in the UK during the Second World War.

== History ==
The 1935–1940 London Passenger Transport Board (LPTB) New Works Programme included a new deep level station in Bethnal Green. This was part of the Central line extension from Liverpool Street to Ongar and Woodford over the London & North Eastern Railway suburban branch to Epping, as well as a new underground line between Leytonstone and Newbury Park. This was to be built under the A12 Eastern Avenue to serve the new suburbs under development in the north Ilford and the Hainault Loop.

Construction of the eastern extension of the Central Line began in the 1930s and the tunnels were almost complete at the outbreak of the Second World War, although rails had not been laid.

The station opened with the extension of the Central line to Stratford station on 4 December 1946. In the early 2000s, the station was refurbished by Metronet.

=== Wartime disaster ===
The unfinished station at Bethnal Green was requisitioned in 1940 at the onset of the first Blitz and administration was assigned to the local authority, the Metropolitan Borough of Bethnal Green, under the supervision of the "Regional Commissioners", the generic name for the London Civil Defence Service. Heavy air raids began in October and thousands of people took shelter there, often remaining overnight. Use of the shelter dwindled in 1941, as the air forces of Nazi Germany and the Kingdom of Italy were redirected to the Soviet Union. A relative lull occurred, although the number of shelterers rose again when retaliatory bombing in response to Royal Air Force raids was expected.

On 3 March 1943, the British media reported a heavy RAF raid on Berlin on the night of 1–2 March. With retaliatory bombing expected, the air raid Civil Defence siren sounded at 8:17 pm, beginning a large and orderly flow of people down the blacked-out staircase from the street. A middle-aged woman and a child fell over, three steps up from the base, and others fell around her, tangled in an immovable mass which grew, as they struggled, to nearly 300 people. Some got free, but 173, most of them women and children, were crushed and asphyxiated; about 60 others were taken to hospital. An Air Raid Warden's report, written at 5:30 am on 4 March, described the event as "Panic [...] apparently caused by a person falling and bringing would-be shelterers to the ground. Death by asphyxiation in the subsequent stampede was the main cause of the fatalities."

News of the disaster was withheld for 36 hours and reporting of what had happened was censored, giving rise to allegations of a cover-up, although it was in line with existing wartime reporting restrictions. Among the reports which never ran was one filed by Eric Linden of the Daily Mail, who witnessed the disaster. Information that was provided was sparse.

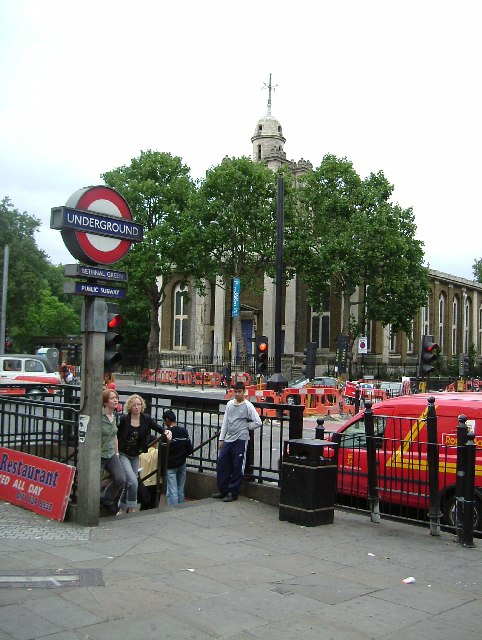
View from the south-western entrance towards St John's

Fuller details were eventually released on 20 January 1945; the cause had been "kept a secret for 22 months because the government felt the information might have resulted in the Germans continuing air raids with the intention of causing similar panics." When the prime minister, Winston Churchill, saw the report on 6 April, saying that the cause was public panic during an air raid, he determined that it should be suppressed until the end of hostilities as it would be an "invitation to repeat" to the enemy and also as it contradicted earlier official comments that there was no panic. The home secretary of the day, Herbert Morrison, disagreed and Clement Attlee, MP for the nearby Limehouse constituency, wanted to prevent rumours that the panic was due to "Jews and/or Fascists".

The results of the official investigation were not released until 1946. At the end of the war, the Minister of Home Security, Herbert Morrison, quoted from a secret report to the effect that there had been a panic, caused by the discharge of Z Battery anti-aircraft rockets fired from nearby Victoria Park. During the war, other authorities had disagreed, the Shoreditch Coroner, Mr W.R.H. Heddy, said that there was "nothing to suggest any stampede or panic or anything of the kind". Mr Justice Singleton, summarising his decision in Baker v Bethnal Green Corporation, an action for damages by a bereaved widow, said "there was nothing in the way of rushing or surging" on the staircase. The Master of the Rolls, Lord Greene, reviewing the lower court's judgement, said "it was perfectly well known [...] that there had been no panic". Lord Greene also rebuked the Ministry for requiring the hearing to be held in secret. The Baker lawsuit was followed by other claims, resulting in damages of nearly £60,000, the last of which was made in the early 1950s. The secret official report, by a Metropolitan magistrate, Laurence Rivers Dunne, acknowledged that Bethnal Green Council had warned London Civil Defence, in 1941, that the staircase needed a crush barrier to slow down the crowds but was told that would be a waste of money.

The crush at Bethnal Green is thought to have been both the largest single loss of civilian life in the United Kingdom during the Second World War and the largest loss of life in an incident on the London Underground network. The largest number killed by a wartime bomb was 107 at Wilkinson's Lemonade Factory in North Shields (1941), though there were many more British civilians killed in single bombing raids.

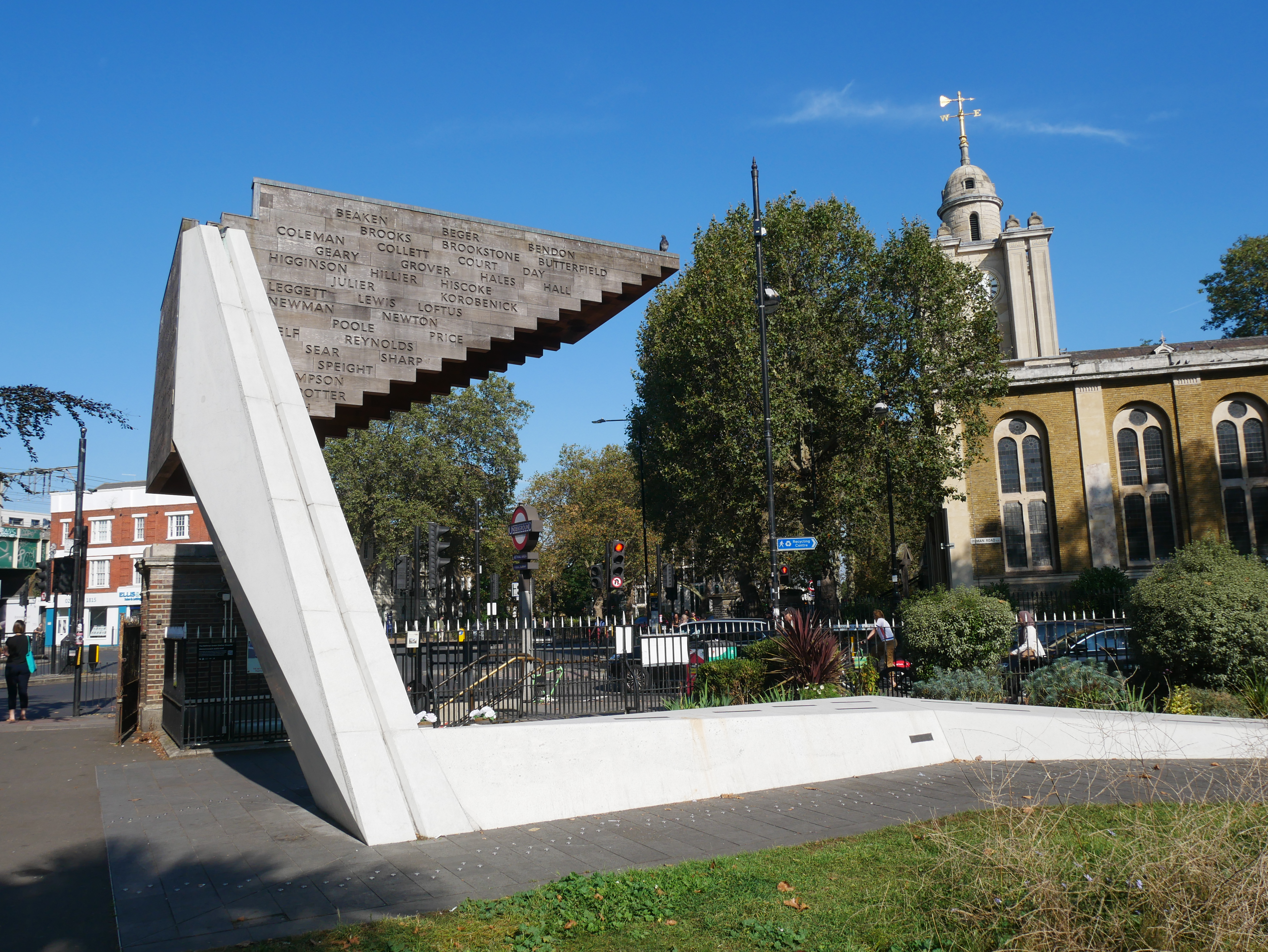
The Stairway to Heaven memorial

Although the deaths were not due to enemy action, 164 of the dead are recorded by name by the Commonwealth War Graves Commission among civilian war dead in the Metropolitan Borough of Bethnal Green, plus seven in the Metropolitan Borough of Stepney. All are recorded as died or injured "in Tube Shelter accident".

==== Legacy ====
In 1975, the ITV network broadcast a dramatised television film about the disaster, It's A Lovely Day Tomorrow, directed and produced by John Goldschmidt, and with a script by Bernard Kops, who as a 16-year-old had witnessed the event. The film was short-listed for an International Emmy in the Fictional Entertainment category, but lost to The Naked Civil Servant.

As part of TUBE Art Installation in November 2013, sound artist Kim Zip created an installation commemorating the disaster. The work was backed by the Whitechapel Gallery and promoted as part of the organisation's "First Thursdays" initiative for popular art. "TUBE" exhibited over a period of four weeks in the belfry of Sir John Soane's St John on Bethnal Green Church. St John's overlooks the site of the tragedy and was commandeered as a temporary mortuary on the night of 3 March 1943.

In April 2016, Dr Joan Martin, who was on duty as a junior casualty officer at the nearby Queen Elizabeth Hospital for Children and led the medical team dealing with the dead and wounded from the incident, told BBC Radio 4's Eddie Mair about her personal experiences on the evening of the disaster, and its long-term effects on her life.

An oral history project involving interviews with the disaster survivors and relatives was completed by the University of East London in 1995 which resulted in a book, audio trail at the memorial site. touring exhibition and educational materials for school children.

Director Steve McQueen's 2024 film Blitz was partly inspired by this event.

The 2023 novel Nineteen Steps by Millie Bobby Brown recounts the events and aftermath of the disaster, based on the experiences of her family.

== Design ==
The station is an example of the style adopted by London Transport for new tube stations under the New Works Programme of 1935–1940. Extensive use is made of pale yellow tiling, originally manufactured by Poole Pottery. This has been replicated during the 2007 modernisation although several panels of original tiling have been retained on the platforms. The finishes include relief tiles, showing symbols of London and the area served by the London Passenger Transport Board, designed by Harold Stabler. The station entrances, all in the form of subway access staircases to the subterranean ticket hall, show the design influences of Charles Holden, the consulting architect for London Transport at this time.

=== Memorials ===
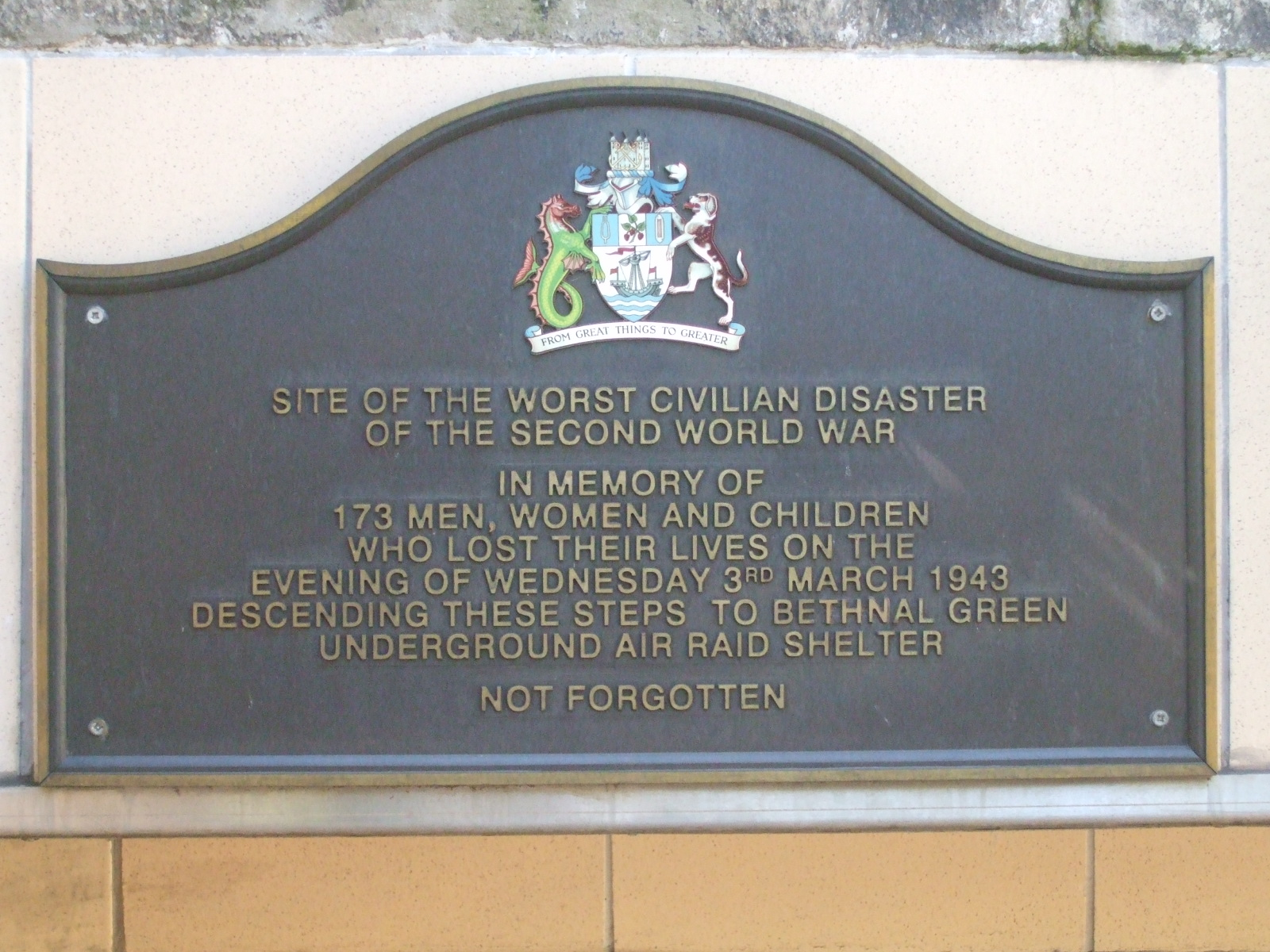
Plaque to the 1943 disaster

A plaque commemorating the 1943 disaster was erected on the station's south-eastern staircase, on which the deaths occurred, for the fiftieth anniversary in 1993. It bears the coat of arms of the London Borough of Tower Hamlets, and records the event as the "worst civilian disaster of the Second World War".

The "Stairway to Heaven Memorial Trust" was established in 2007 to create a more prominent public memorial to those who died in the disaster. The memorial was designed by local architects Harry Patticas and Jens Borstlemann of Arboreal Architecture. It is located in a corner of Bethnal Green Garden, immediately outside the tube station, and was unveiled on 16 December 2017, during the 75th year after the event. It takes the form of an open inverted stairway of 18 steps, made of teak overhanging a concrete plinth and is a full-sized replica of the stairway where the disaster occurred. The names of the dead are carved on the exterior and the top covering has 173 small holes allowing light through representing the dead.

== Location ==
The station is sited on Cambridge Heath Road in the Bethnal Green neighbourhood of the London Borough of Tower Hamlets. London Buses routes 8, 106, 254, 309, 388, D3 and D6 serve the station; night routes are N8 and N253.

Mile End station lies 1.0 mi (1.6 km) to the east of the station and Liverpool Street is 1.4 mi (2.3 km) to the west.

== Services ==
The station lies on the Central line and is managed by London Underground. The typical off-peak service from the station, in trains per hour (tph), is:

- Eastbound: 24 tph to Leytonstone; of which:
  - 9 tph continue to Epping
  - 3 tph to Loughton
  - 3 tph to Hainault via Newbury Park
  - 3 tph to Newbury Park.
- Westbound: 24 tph to White City; of which:
  - 9 tph continue to West Ruislip
  - 3 tph to Northolt
  - 9 tph to Ealing Broadway.

Preceding station	London Underground	Following station
Liverpool Street towards Ealing Broadway or West Ruislip	Central line	Mile End towards Epping, Hainault or Woodford via Newbury Park
