= Barnyard Collection =

Irish coinage series

The Barnyard Collection was a series of coins minted in 1928. Designed by Percy Metcalfe, these coins were used as the first currency of the Irish Free State.

Name Irish name	Numeral	Reverse Design	Image
Farthing; Feoirling	1/4d	Woodcock	
Halfpenny; Leath-phingin	1/2d	Pig and Piglets	
Penny; Pingin	1d	Hen and Chicks	
Threepence; Leath-reul	3d	Hare	
Sixpence; Reul	6d	Wolfhound	
Shilling; Scilling	1s	Bull	
Florin; Flóirín	2s	Salmon	
Half Crown; Leath-choróin	2s 6d	Horse	
