= Phoebe Stabler =

English artist

- Born: Phoebe Gertrude McLeish; 1879; Handsworth, Birmingham
- Died: 1955 (aged 75–76); Hammersmith, London
- Known for: Sculpture, pottery, metalworking, wood carving
- Style: Arts and Crafts

Phoebe Gertrude Stabler (née McLeish, 1879–1955) was an English artist working across many mediums including metalwork, pottery, enamel and wood in the late nineteenth and early-mid twentieth centuries. "Although Stabler is best known for her pottery figures, during the 1920s and 1930s she was also well known for her stone carvings and was an important contributor to the British Empire Exhibition at Wembley, 1924."

== Biography ==
Stabler was born in Birmingham, but grew up in Liverpool, where both her parents originated. Stabler was one of five or more children, with her two sisters also following creative careers as jewellery designers. Stabler first studied at the Liverpool School of Art in the 1890s, where two of her sisters also attended. During this time she was awarded the City Scholarship and Travelling Scholarship. She went on to study at the Royal College of Art in London.

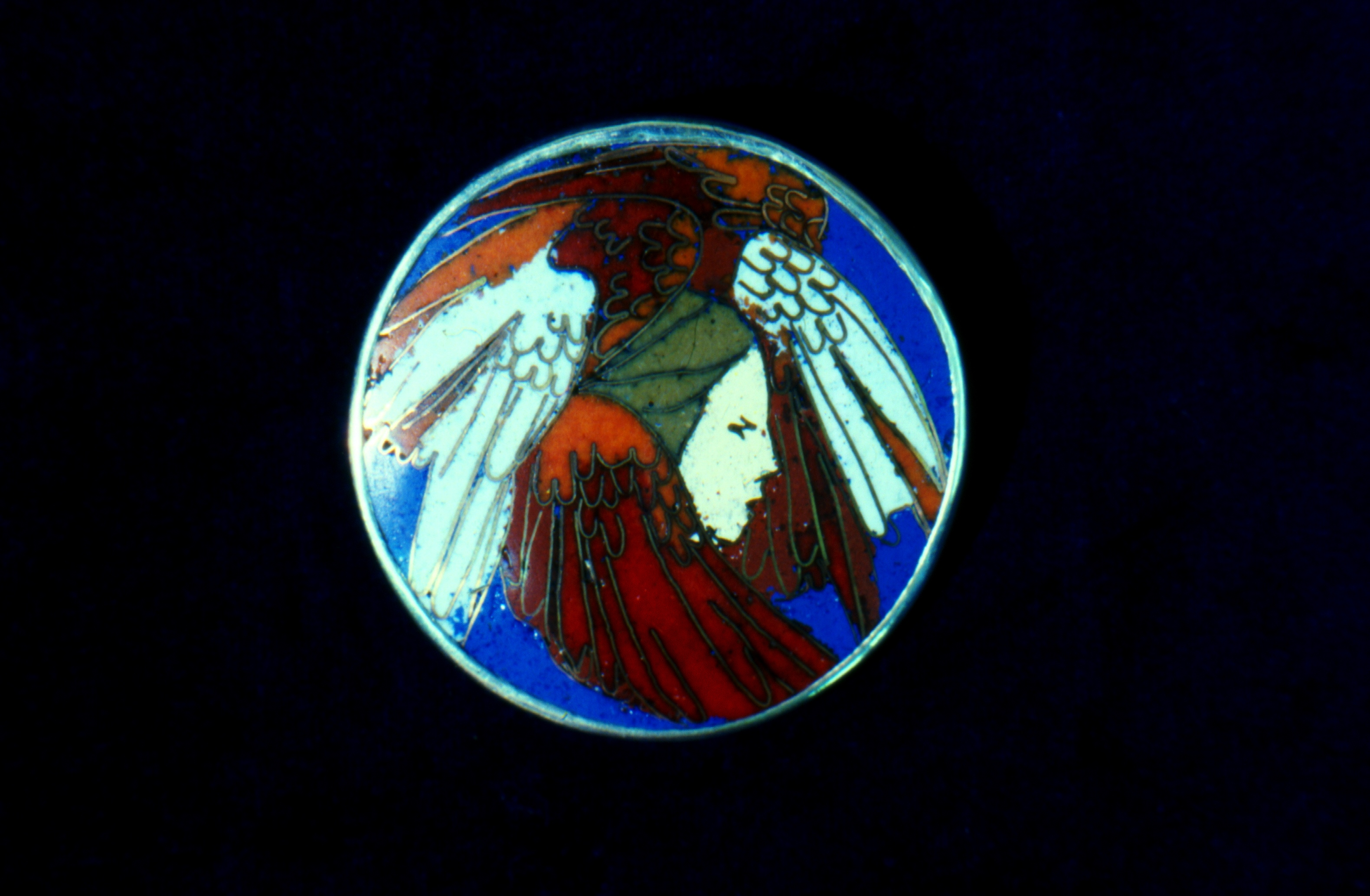
Cloisonne enamel roundel of an angel in the style of Phoebe Stabler

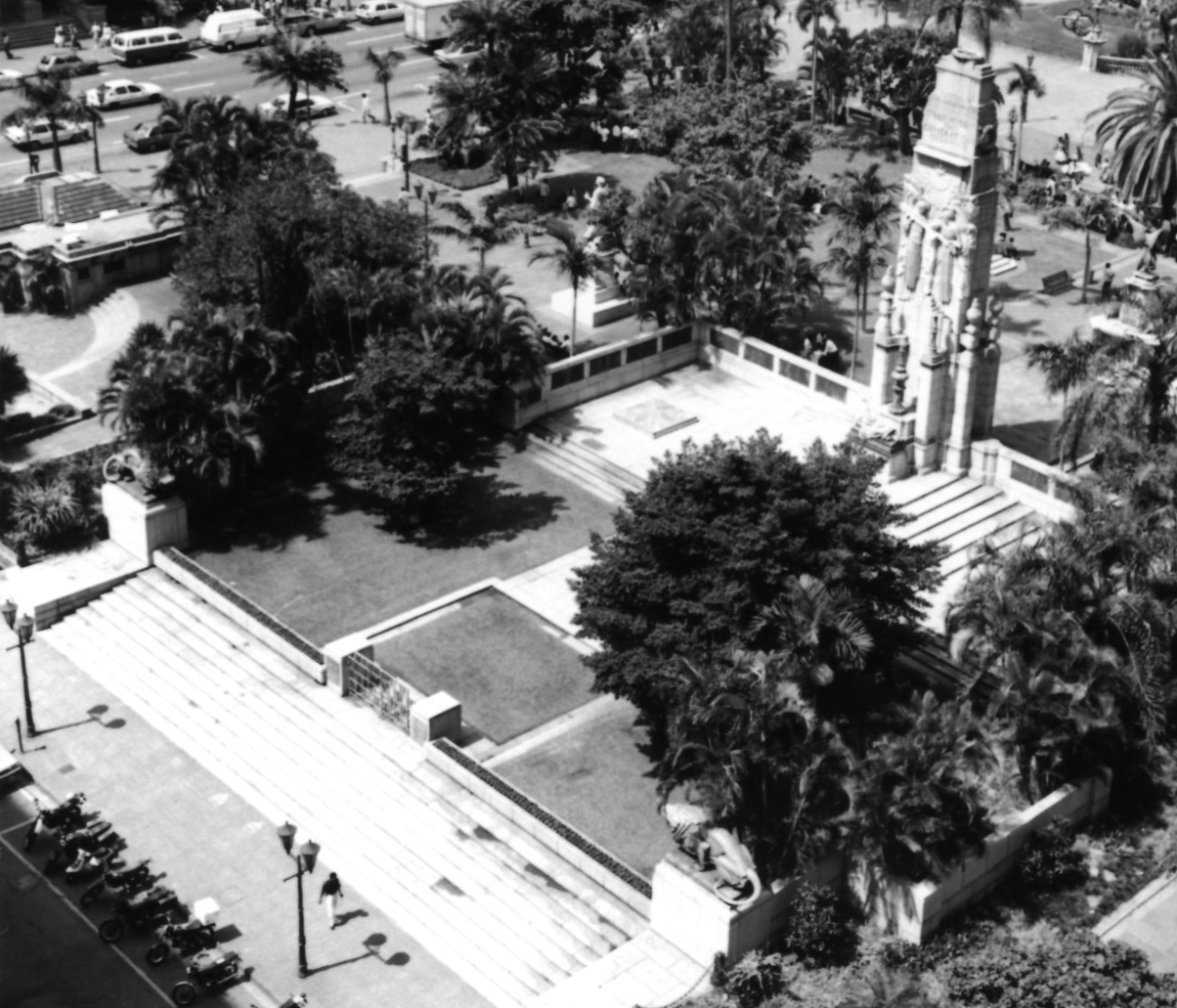
Cenotaph in Farewell Square, Durban, South Africa, circa 1994

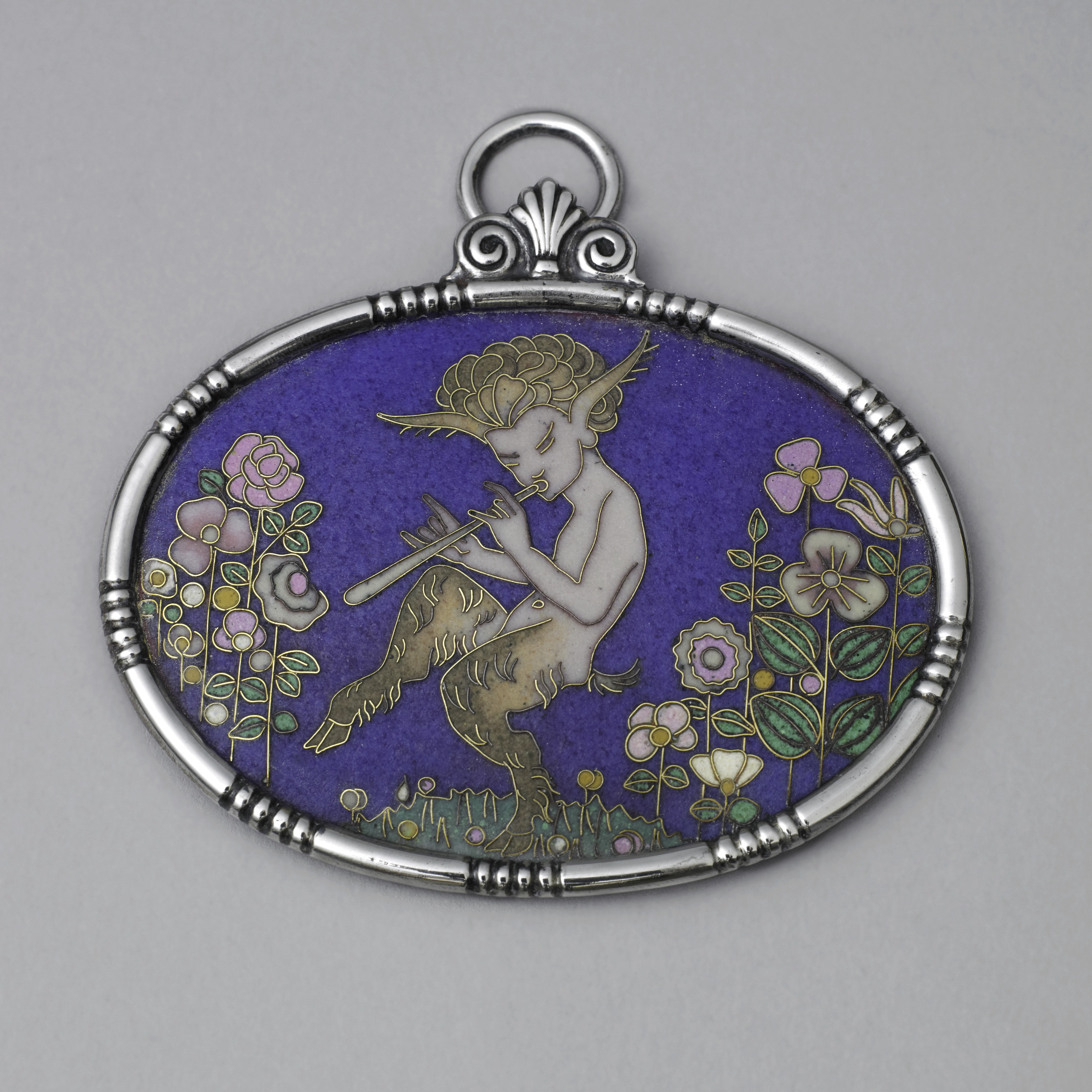
Cloisonne enamel pendant of Pan

== Artwork ==
In 1906, she married Harold Stabler. From 1912, Stabler and her husband, had a kiln in Hammersmith, London, where they worked collaboratively as well as Stabler producing garden ornaments. She created richly glazed pottery figures which were produced by both the Royal Worcester and Royal Doulton and Poole Pottery. For Poole Pottery, she collaborated with her husband to design the ceramics for The Cenotaph in Durban. Stabler also designed works for Ashtead Potters, a pottery that employed ex-servicemen after the First World War.

Stabler created the World's Land-Speed Trophy that was awarded to Sir Henry Segrave.

In 2018, The Light of Knowledge (1927) ceramic tile panel was put on display at the Rugby Art Gallery & Museum following a fundraising effort to have it restored.

== Selected exhibitions ==
Stabler's work was exhibited widely, including at the following institutes,

- Royal Glasgow Institute of the Fine Arts
- Society of Women Artists
- Royal Academy of Arts
- New Society of Artists
- Walker Art Gallery
- Women's International Art Club
- Sir John Cass Arts and Crafts Society
- Arts and Crafts Exhibition Society
- British Institute of Industrial Art

== Works held in Collections ==
Title	Year	Medium	Gallery no.	Gallery	Location
Buster Boy	1916	stoneware	C487	Aberystwyth University Ceramics Collection	Aberystwyth, Wales
Buster Boy	1921–1923	stoneware	C488	Aberystwyth University Ceramics Collection	Aberystwyth, Wales
Buster Girl	1922	stoneware	C487	Aberystwyth University Ceramics Collection	Aberystwyth, Wales
Lavender Woman	ca.1913	stoneware	C.13-1978	Victoria and Albert Museum	London, England
Memory	-	Portland stone	L.F9.1927.0.0	Leicester Arts and Museums Service	Leicester, England
Pickaback (maquette)	1908	plaster	AH02479/83	Abbot Hall Art Gallery	Kendal, England
Sleep	1922	unknown	C484	Aberystwyth University Ceramics Collection	Aberystwyth, Wales
Sleep	1922	stoneware	C485	Aberystwyth University Ceramics Collection	Aberystwyth, Wales
The Bath Towel	1916	stoneware	C482	Aberystwyth University Ceramics Collection	Aberystwyth, Wales
The Bath Towel	1914	stoneware	C483	Aberystwyth University Ceramics Collection	Aberystwyth, Wales
The Bull	1922–1923	stoneware	C507	Aberystwyth University Ceramics Collection	Aberystwyth, Wales
The Lavender Woman	1915	stoneware	C480	Aberystwyth University Ceramics Collection	Aberystwyth, Wales
The Lavender Woman	1925	stoneware	C481	Aberystwyth University Ceramics Collection	Aberystwyth, Wales
The Lavender Woman	1922–1925	stoneware	C486	Aberystwyth University Ceramics Collection	Aberystwyth, Wales
The Light of Knowledge	1927	ceramic	-	Rugby Art Gallery and Museum	Rugby, England
The Young Mother	1927 or before	concrete	L.F10.1927.0.0	New Walk Museum & Art Gallery	Leicester, England
