= The Cenotaph, Durban =

World War I memorial in South Africa

The Cenotaph
- Durban, South Africa
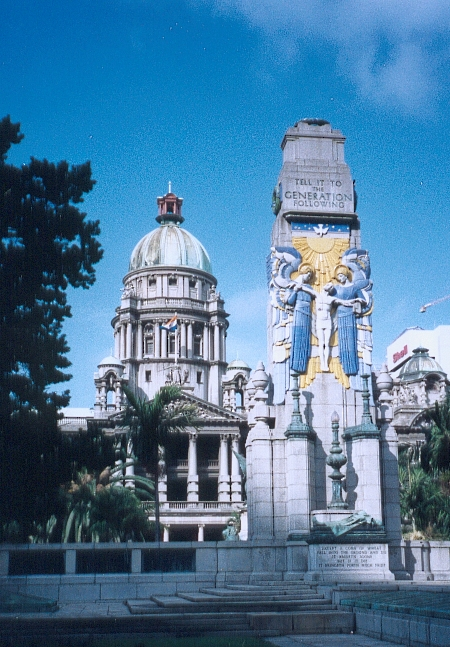
- For soldiers who died in World War I
- Unveiled: 1926
- Location: 29°51′31.33″S 31°01′30.78″E; Durban
- Designed by: Eagle, Pilkington and McQueen
- Tell it to the generation following Except a corn of wheat fall into the ground and die it abideth alone but if it die it bringeth forth much fruit

The Cenotaph in Farewell Square, Durban, South Africa, was erected as a war memorial to soldiers who died in World War I.

Standing about 11 metres (36 feet) high, the Cenotaph is built out of granite decorated with glazed ceramic tiles depicting two angels raising the soul of a dead soldier. The vivid color of the figurative decoration makes the Cenotaph possibly unique among World War I memorials of its kind.

The design was the result of a competition in 1921, won by the Cape Town architectural firm of Eagle, Pilkington, and McQueen. The ceramics were made in England by Harold and Phoebe Stabler of the Poole Pottery, and shipped to Durban for assembly: because this process took some time, the memorial was only unveiled in 1926.

The stone parts of the monument are handsomely designed in neoclassical style: pillars supporting electric torches and granite urns surround the main structure. As with other Commonwealth cenotaphs a wreath crowns the top, although in this case it is made of green ceramic. The legend "Tell it to the generation following" appears just below. A metal statue of a dead soldier lies stretched out on a plinth in front of the monument.

The Cenotaph is set in a small garden walled in stone with memorial plaques and closed off from the street by a fence. The entrance to the garden, and the view of the front of the memorial, is guarded by a remarkable pair of large snarling Art Deco lions on high plinths. The ceramic decoration, with its clear lines, strong colors, and sunburst, is in the same style, of which Durban features many fine examples. The neoclassical and Art Deco elements work harmoniously together to make this one of the most striking and lavishly decorated memorials of its kind.

The Cenotaph was the object of a bombing attack in June 1981, when a large granite basin behind the memorial was slightly damaged.

== Gallery ==
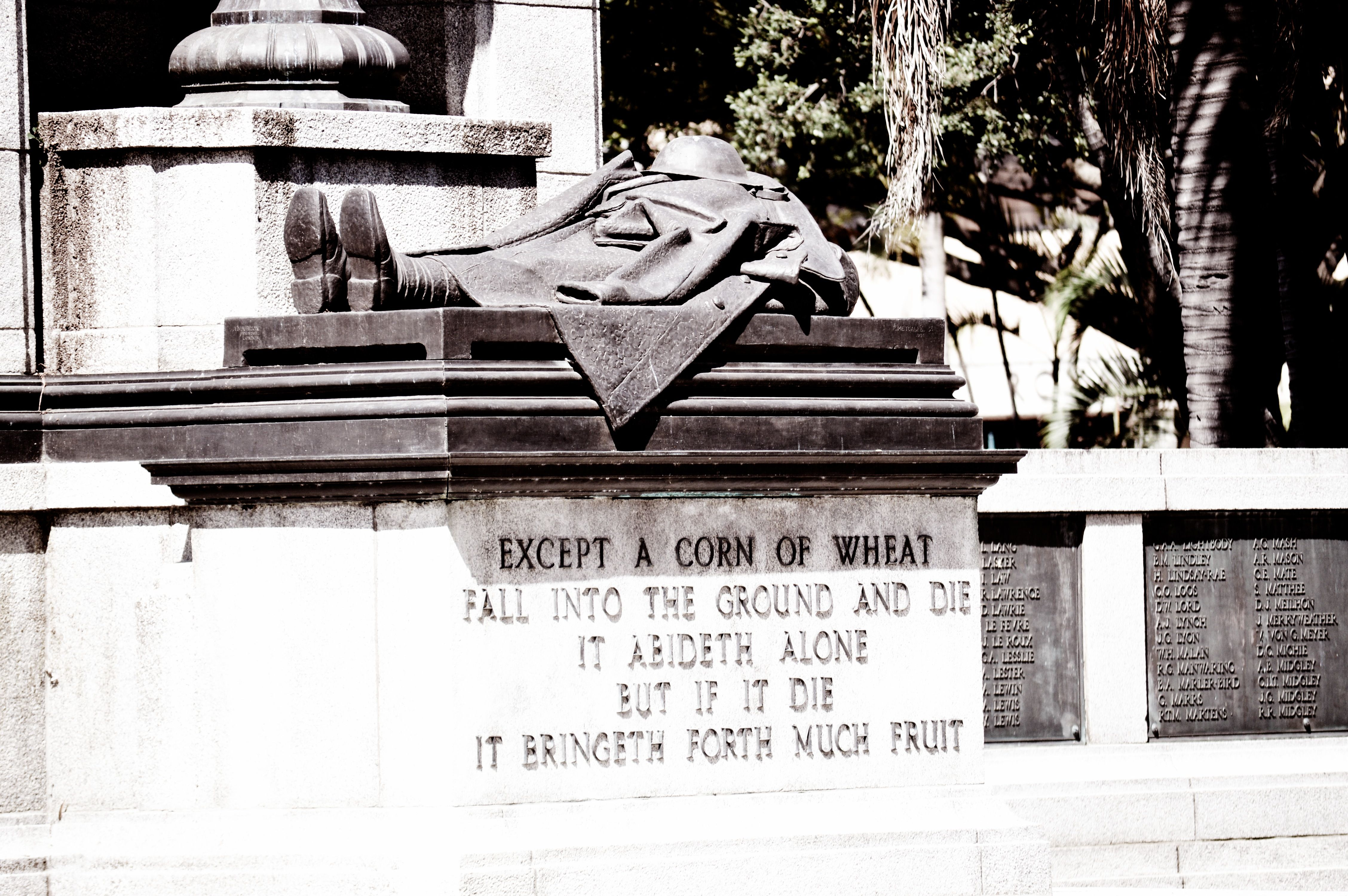
Close-up of plinth

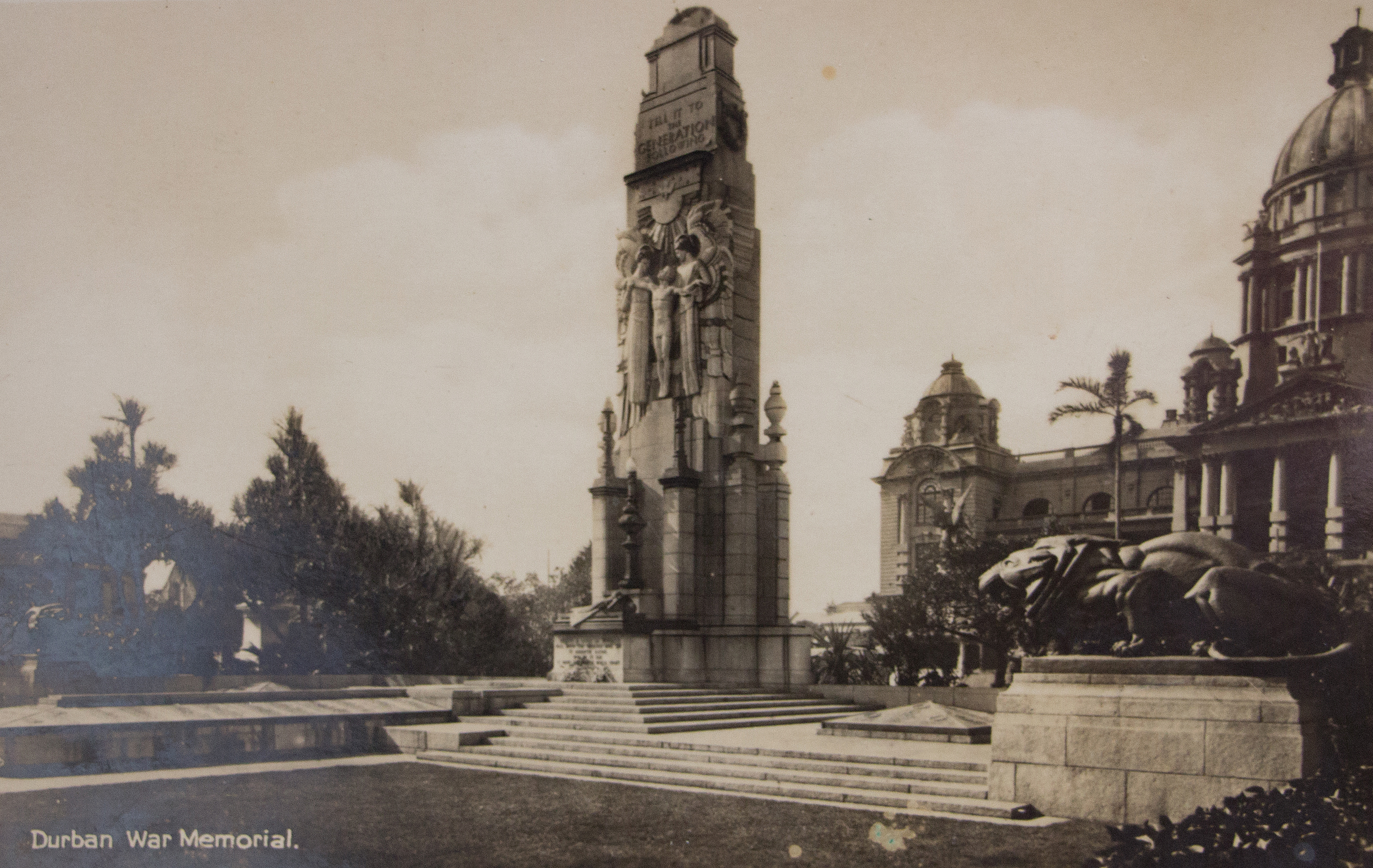
Postcard

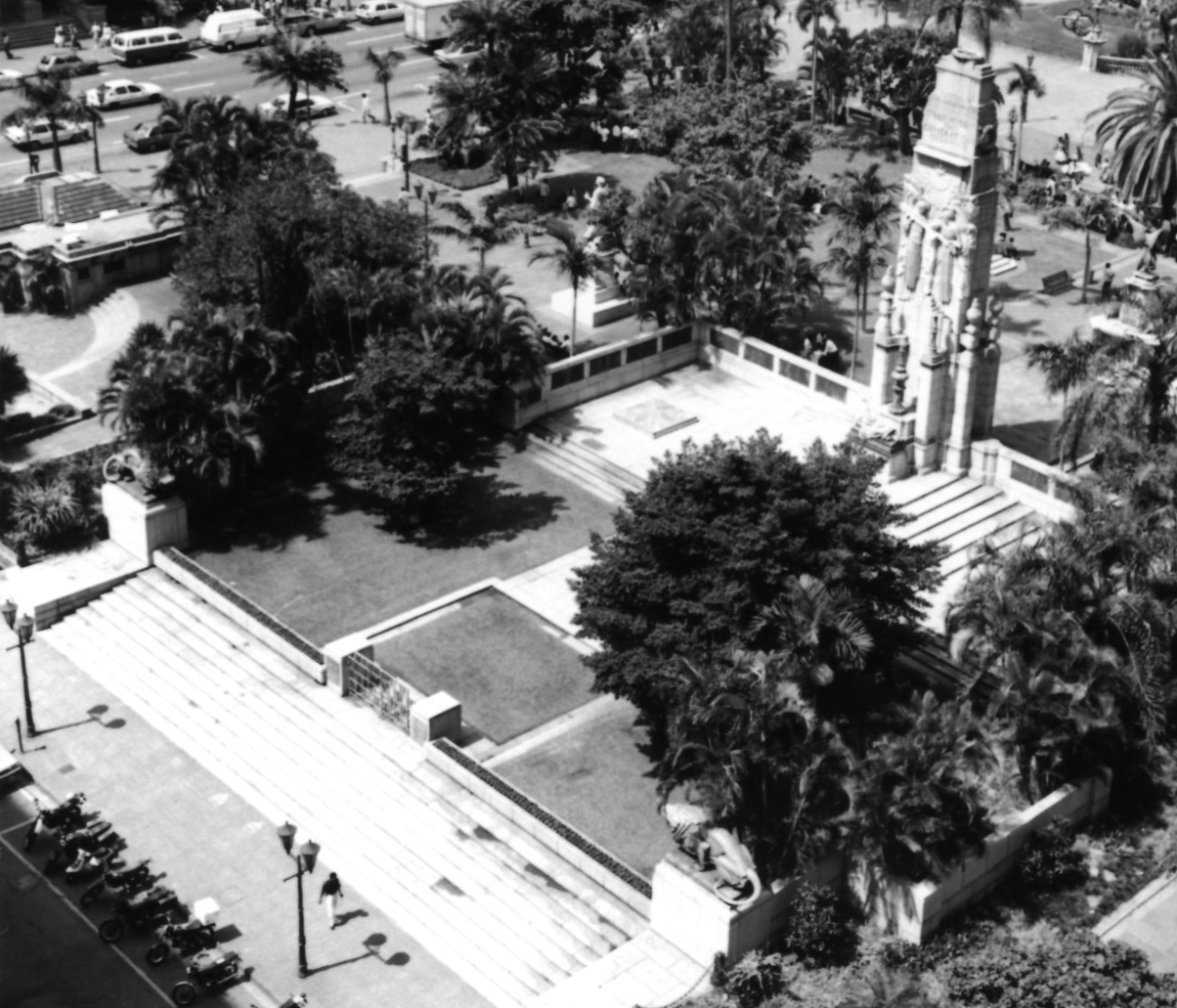
Farewell Square
