= Ashtead (disambiguation) =

Ashtead may refer to:

== Ashtead, Surrey ==
- Ashtead, a village in Surrey, England.
  - Ashtead Common, a wood to the north of Ashtead.
  - Ashtead Park, a park at Ashtead in Surrey.
  - Ashtead railway station, a railway station in Surrey.

== Companies associated with Ashtead, Surrey ==
- Ashtead Group, a British industrial equipment rental company.
- Ashtead potters, a former pottery company that operated from 1923 to 1935.

== See also ==
- Ashted, an area of Birmingham
