= Ashtead potters =

The Ashtead Pottery was opened in 1923 and continued in operation until 1935. It was based in Ashtead, Surrey, England at the Victoria Works. The operating firm, Ashtead Potters Ltd., employed disabled ex-servicemen recruited via labour exchanges across the south of England.

The founder was Sir Lawrence Weaver, who received assistance from Clough Williams-Ellis and politician Stafford Cripps. At its beginning the firm had four employees, expanding later to a workforce of up to forty men. Workers with families were housed in sheltered housing in Purcell Close.

A wide range of wares was produced, including figures and commemoratives and a range of tableware. Designers included Phoebe Stabler (Poole Pottery and Royal Doulton) and Percy Metcalfe. The firm exhibited at the Wembley British Empire Exhibitions of 1924 and 1925, selling souvenirs bearing the Wembley Lion designed by Frederick Charles Herrick (1887–1970). The designs used bold and bright colours, but some glazes were unpredictable, so the orange glaze pieces were more expensive and the 'Hoop' design with horizontal stripes sometimes included an unstable glaze.

The Ashtead Pottery closed in January 1935 due to a downturn in trade in the 1930s, and the death of Sir Lawrence. Victoria Works was demolished in 1985 and the site redeveloped as a sheltered housing project. A plaque commemorates Ashtead Potters Limited.

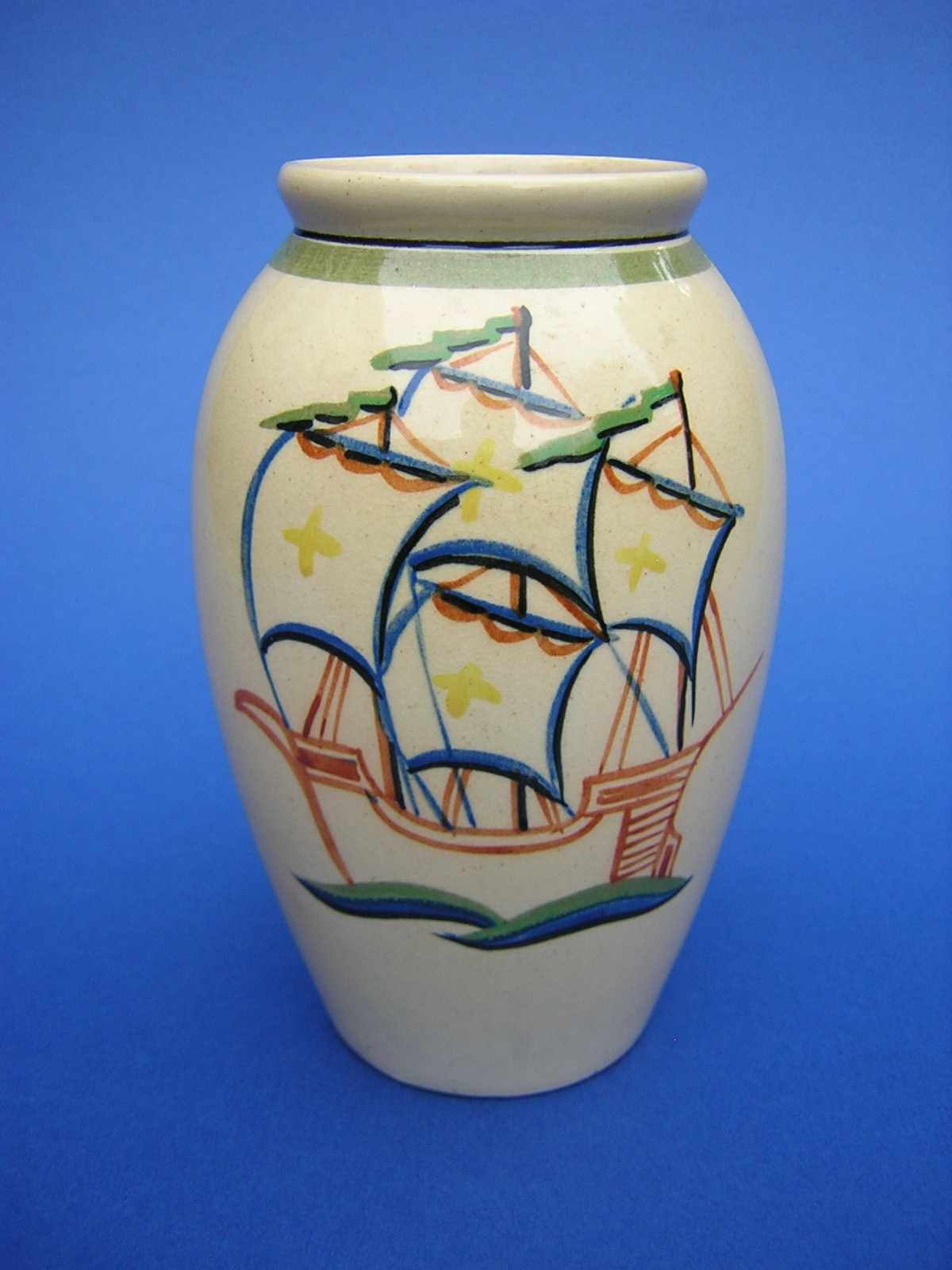
Ashstead potter's vase

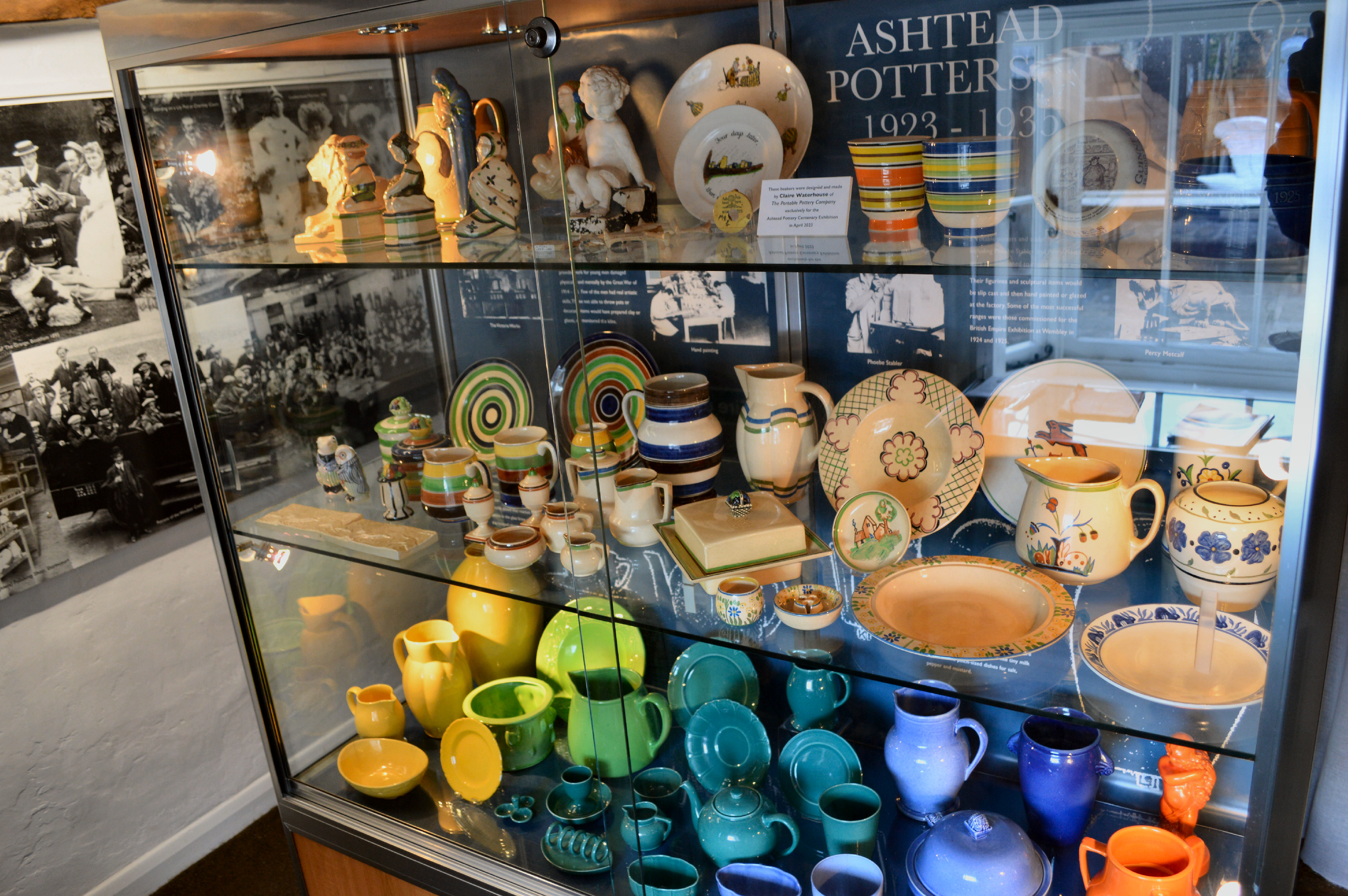
Leatherhead Museum exhibition

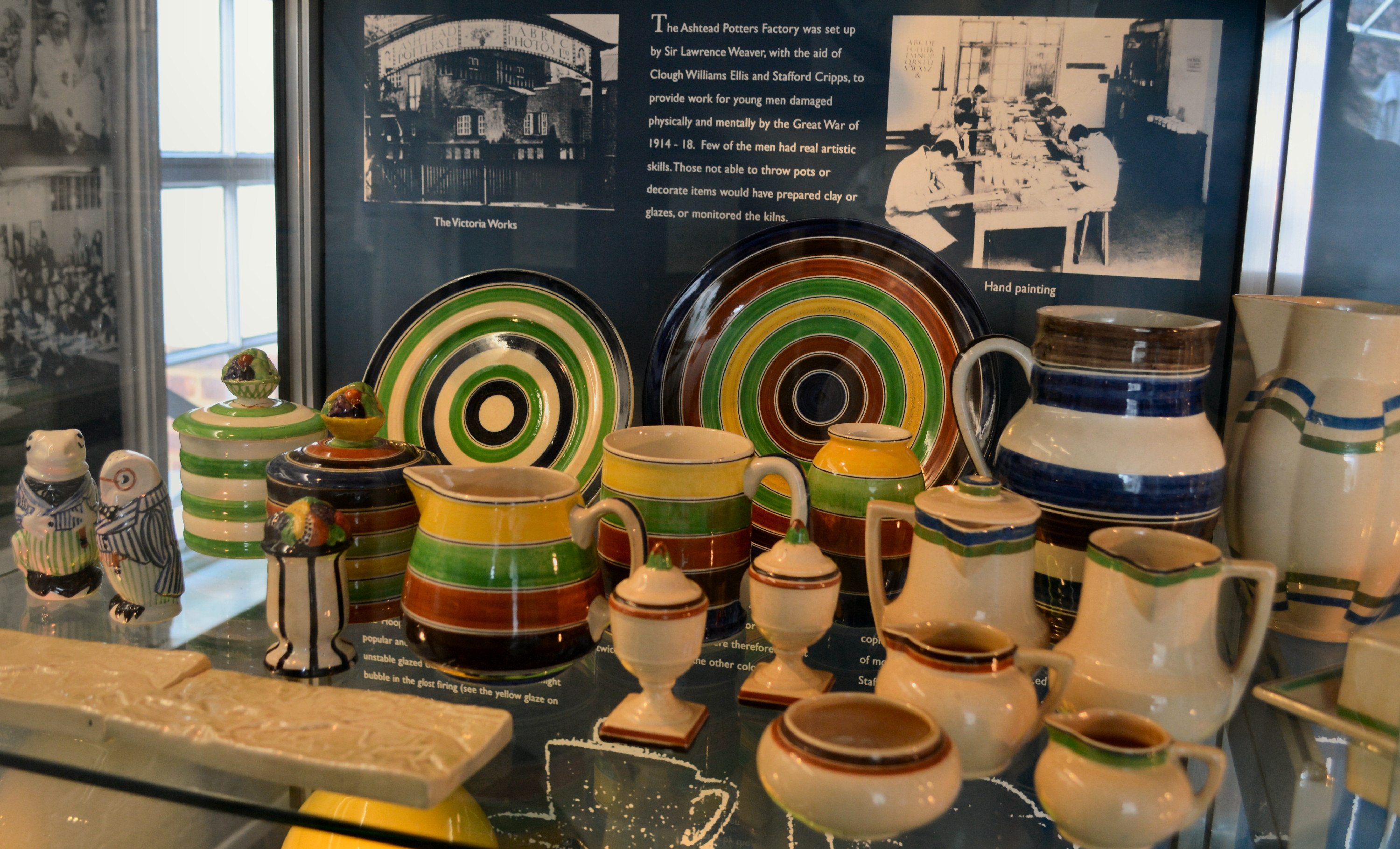
Leatherhead Museum exhibition
