= Flag of Essex =

Flag of English county

Essex
- Proportion: 3:5
- Design: Three Saxon seaxes on a red field
- Designed by: Traditional

The Flag of Essex is the flag of the English county of Essex. The flag is ancient in origin and features three notched Saxon seaxes (cutlasses) on a red field, representing the Saxon origins of Essex.

Saxon occupation of land that was to form the Kingdom of Essex had begun by the early 5th century at Mucking and other locations. A large proportion of the original settlers came from Old Saxony. It became one of the seven kingdoms (The Heptarchy) that united to form England over the course of the 9th, 10th and 11th centuries. The seaxes used on the flag were used as a symbol of this kingdom.

Due to the antiquity of the symbol, it is difficult to pinpoint the exact date the flag was designed, but it is earliest attested in the 17th century. It was made official by the county in 1889.

== History ==
Essex coat of arms, the arms of Essex County Council.

The earliest references to the flag being used to represent the county date back to the 17th century. A Restitution of Decayed Intelligence, written in 1605 by Richard Verstegan, referred to the Anglo-Saxons bearing a standard of "Three seaxes argent, in a field gules [red tincture]". Similarly, cartographer John Speed included the flag in his 1611 atlas The Theatre of the Empire of Great Britaine, on the title page and on the edge of a map about the Anglo-Saxon heptarchy, (the seven kingdoms that would go on to form England). Winston Churchill also included the three seaxes as being representative of Essex in his 1675 work Divi Britannici. As a result of this, the symbol was installed on a stained glass window in Westminster Abbey in 1735.

Though it is frequently attested that the design involved three seaxes arranged thus originates from the coat of arms of Essex during the Kingdom, there is no direct evidence for this, and a number of other theories as to their origin exist. These include the idea propounded by historian James Lloyd who suggested they were lifted from the coat of arms of the Kingdom of Kent, which are shown to contain three cutlasses in a document from the 15th century.

By 1815 the flag had become synonymous with the county, appearing as the masthead on the Chelmsford Chronicle and as the logo of the Essex and Suffolk Equitable Insurance Society. By the late 19th and early 20th centuries, the flag saw widespread usage throughout the county, appearing on buildings and infrastructure in numerous settlements.

=== Local government use ===
In 1889, Essex County Council adopted the flag as its own symbol.

The Flag Institute formally recognised the flag's relationship with the county in the early 21st century.

On 26 October 2014, the flag of Essex flew outside the Department for Communities and Local Government in order to mark Essex Day. The day was chosen in order to mark the feast of Saint Cedd. David Finch, at the time a councillor for Essex County Council, said:

The 3 seaxes are a really important symbol of Essex culture and history so it’s wonderful that our flag is flying over Westminster today. As one of the biggest counties in England with a focus on growth, prosperity and innovation, I’m delighted that Essex is being recognised by government.

The next year, Eric Pickles, Conservative Local Government Secretary made it easier to fly the Essex flag without a permit, as a part of a nationwide initiative to "champion England’s local and national identities".

== Design ==
The flag features three gold-pommeled seaxes, which are Saxon swords used for fighting. The seax is used in heraldry in other situations, most notably in the flag of Middlesex, which has a very similar design to the Essex flag. The swords are a nod to the Germanic origins of Essex, and the ancient Kingdom of Essex featured a similar design on their coat of arms. It is difficult to pinpoint when the flag was designed in its current form, as the three sword design is cited back to the Saxon era, but this particular form is first mentioned in the early 17th century by Richard Verstegan in his Restitution of Decayed Intelligence (1605).

Actual seaxes were of a different shape; the swords depicted on the flag more closely resemble scimitars. The origin of these depictions is difficult to pinpoint, and there are a number of theories as to their origin.

The Pantone colours for the flag are:

Scheme	Red	White	Gold
Pantone (Paper)	186 C	White	116 C
Web colours	#C8102E	#FFFFFF	#FFCD00
RGB	200, 16, 46	255, 255, 255	255, 205, 0
CMYK	0%, 92%, 77%, 22%	0%, 0%, 0%, 0%	0%, 20%, 100%, 0%

== Other flags ==
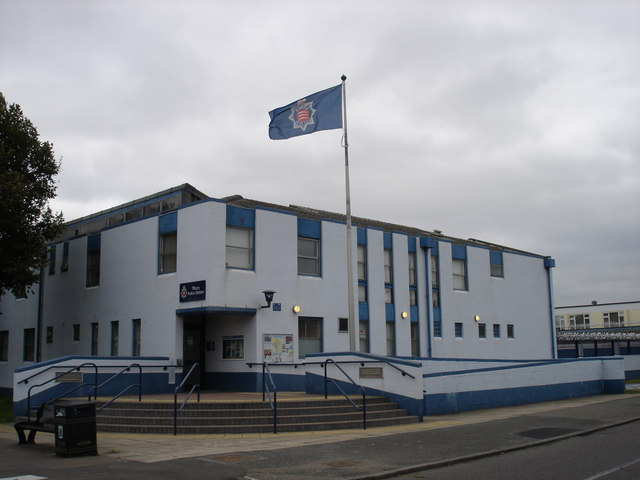
Essex police flag flying outside Tilbury Police Station

The Essex Police have their own flag, their emblem on a blue field.

== See also ==
- Flag of Middlesex
- Flag of Sussex
