= Lawrence Weaver =

English architectural historian

Sir Lawrence Weaver KBE
- Portrait by Walter Stoneman, 1920
- Born: Lawrence Walter William Weaver; 1876; Clifton, Bristol, England
- Died: 10 January 1930 (aged 53–54); St John's Wood, London, England
- Occupations: Architectural writer; civil servant
- Known for: Editing Country Life, organising British halls at the British Empire Exhibition

Sir Lawrence Walter William Weaver KBE (1876–1930) was an English architectural writer and civil servant.

== Early years ==
Lawrence Weaver was the son of Walter and Frances Weaver of Clifton, Bristol. He was educated at Clifton College and was trained as an architect. He began his career as a sales representative at an architectural practice, selling fixtures and fittings. He then moved to London, becoming the representative of Lockerbie and Wilkinson, a firm of ironfounders who made cast-iron ware for the building trade, where he developed an interest in leadwork.

== Journalistic career ==
In 1905 his articles on leadwork topics began to be published in leading journals such as Country Life, Architectural Review, The Burlington Magazine, and The Art Workers' Quarterly. Over time his articles' subject matter widened to cover all aspects of architecture. In 1910 Weaver was appointed Architectural Editor of Country Life, writing on contemporary architecture as an 'advocate of the new' and the Arts and Crafts Movement, and subsequently becoming a director. He wrote a large number of articles on country houses and gardens, especially those by Edwin Lutyens, providing a strong counterpoint to his predecessor, Avray Tipping. In 1913 the magazine was described as "the keeper of the architectural conscience of the nation".

== Career in the civil service ==
During the First World War, from 1916, he became a civil servant. In 1919, when he was the Commercial Secretary of the Board of Agriculture and Fisheries, he founded the National Institute of Agricultural Botany. He was knighted in 1920 (KBE). Weaver's career was subsequently supported by the patronage of Lord Arthur Lee, his Minister of Agriculture and Fisheries (1919–21), owner of the Chequers estate and later co-founder of the Courtauld Institute of Art.

In 1923 he was involved with the creation of the Ashtead Pottery. In 1924 he organised the British pavilions at the British Empire Exhibition.

== Later years ==
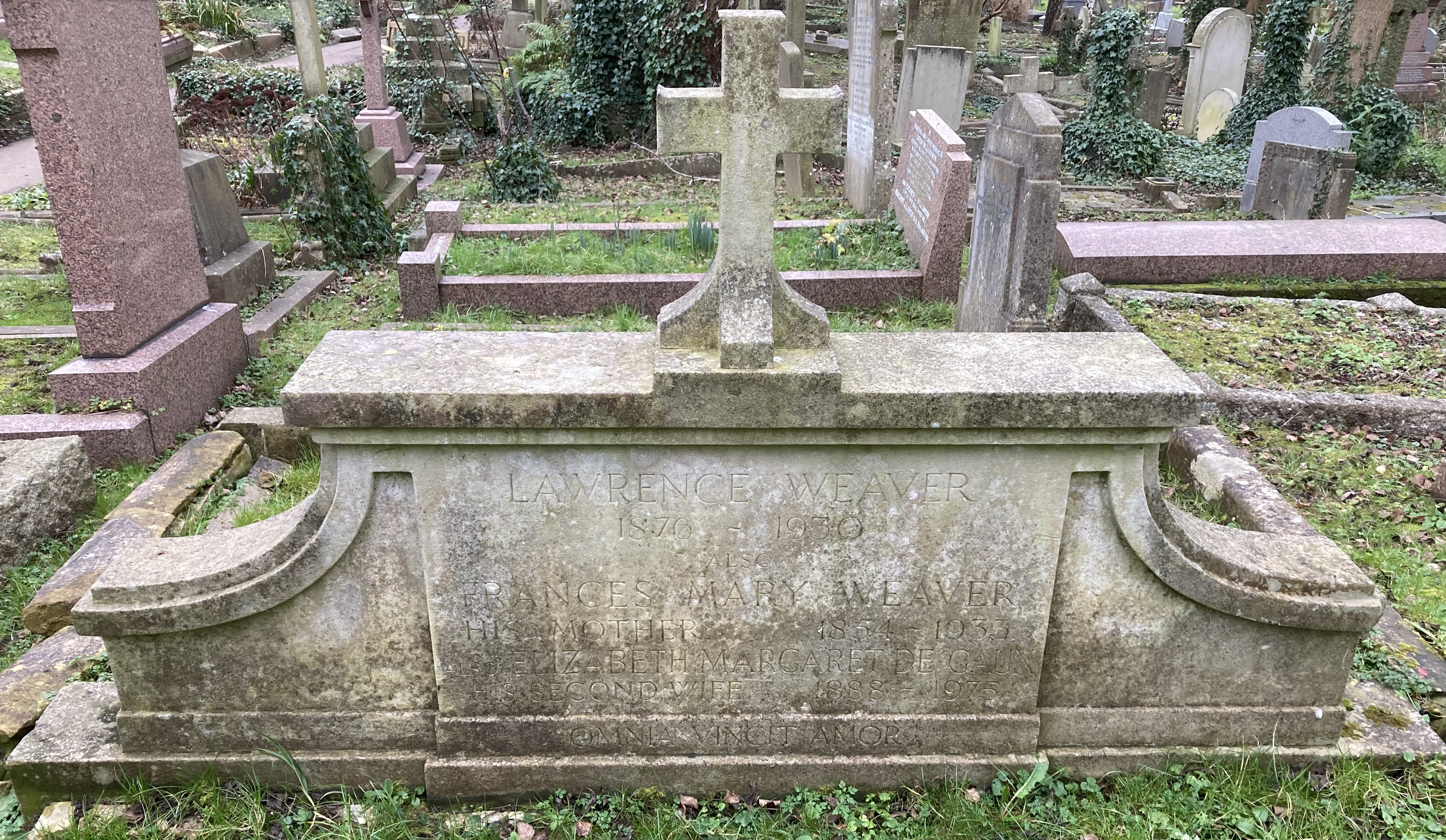
Grave of Lawrence Weaver in Highgate Cemetery

Lawrence's first wife, Kathleen, died in 1927 of pneumonia, and when he died unexpectedly of a heart attack in 1930 at the age of 53, their two sons, Purcell and Tobias were, in effect, adopted by the Sir Stafford Cripps family. Their son, Tobias Rushton Weaver (19 July 1911 – 10 June 2001), Sir Toby from 1973, was a civil servant and educationist, working in the Department of Education and Science for 27 years, culminating in his appointment as Deputy Secretary (1962–73), ending under Margaret Thatcher.

He was buried with his mother Frances Mary Weaver (1854-1933) and his second wife Elizabeth Margaret de Gaux (1888-1975) on the eastern side of Highgate Cemetery. The grave (no.44618) is almost opposite the grave of the celebrated theatre architect, Frank Matcham.

== Books ==
By Weaver:

- English Leadwork: Its Art and History (B. T. Batsford, London, 1909). Illustrated with many b/w photos and drawings.
- The "Country Life" Book of Cottages (Country Life Ltd, 1913). Illustrated with many b/w photographs and plans.
- Small country houses; their repair and enlargement; forty examples chosen from five centuries (Offices of Country life, London, 1914). Illustrated.
- Memorials & monuments old and new: two hundred subjects chosen from seven centuries (Offices of "Country Life", London, 1915). Illustrated with b/w photos and drawings.
- Village clubs and halls (Offices of "Country Life", London, 1920).
- Lutyens houses and gardens (Offices of "Country Life", London, 1921).
- Small country houses of to-day Volume 1, Volume 2 (Offices of Country Life, London, 1922). Illustrated with many b/w photos and plans.
- Sir Christopher Wren, scientist, scholar and architect (Offices of "Country life", London, 1923). Illustrated with b/w photos, and drawings by E. H. New.
- High Wycombe Furniture (The Fanfare Press, London, 1929). Illustrated.

Co-written by Weaver:

- Gardens for Small Country Houses Gertrude Jekyll & Lawrence Weaver (Country Life Ltd, 1914). Illustrated with many b/w photos and plans.
- The Queen's Dolls' House (Everybody's Book of), A. C. Benson & Sir Lawrence Weaver (The Daily Telegraph, Methuen & Co, London, 1924).
