= Percy Metcalfe =

English artist, sculptor and designer (1895–1970)

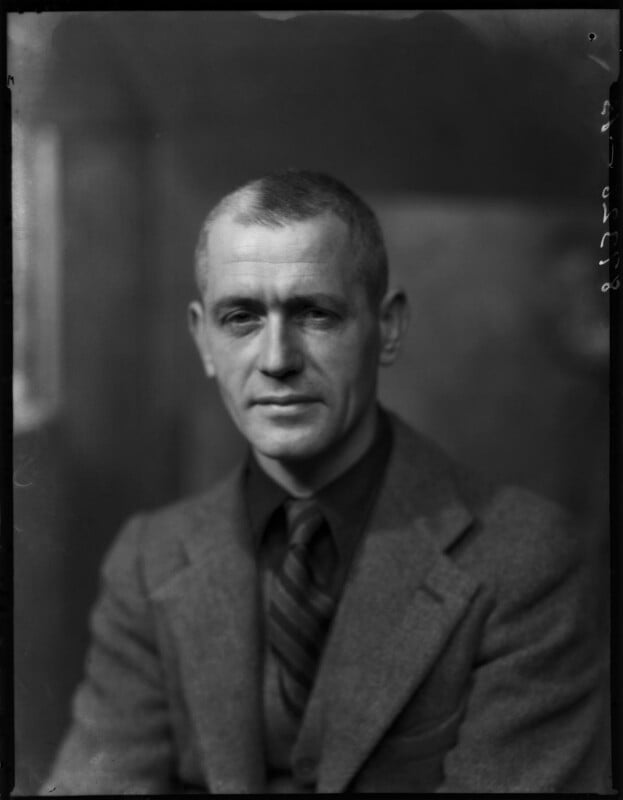
- Metcalfe in 1940
- Born: 14 January 1895; Wakefield, England, United Kingdom
- Died: 9 October 1970 (aged 75)
- Education: Royal College of Art, London
- Notable work: Barnyard Collection, Ashtead Pottery, George Cross, Great Seal of the Realm

Percy Metcalfe, CVO, RDI (14 January 1895 – 9 October 1970) was an English artist, sculptor and designer. He is recognised mostly for his coin designs and his contribution to the Ashtead Pottery Collection.

== Early life ==
He was born on 14 January 1895 and died on 9 October 1970 in Fulham, London. Metcalfe joined the Leeds School of Art in 1910 as a general artist. He moved to sculpting and designing objects as an art form at the Royal College of Art in London. Here he was influenced by Francis Derwent Wood whom he worked with and was mentored by.

== Life as an artist ==
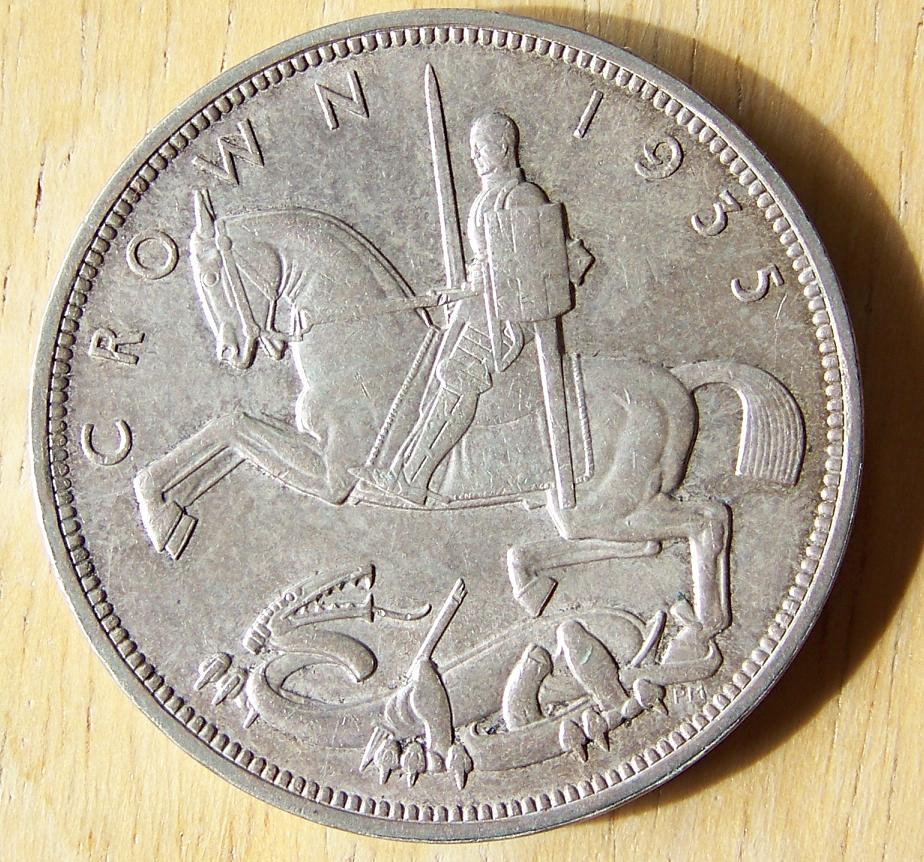
Metcalfe designed the reverse of the 1935 Crown, featuring a modern depiction of Saint George and the Dragon. His initials are under the dragon's tail.

1947 rupee engraved by Metcalfe
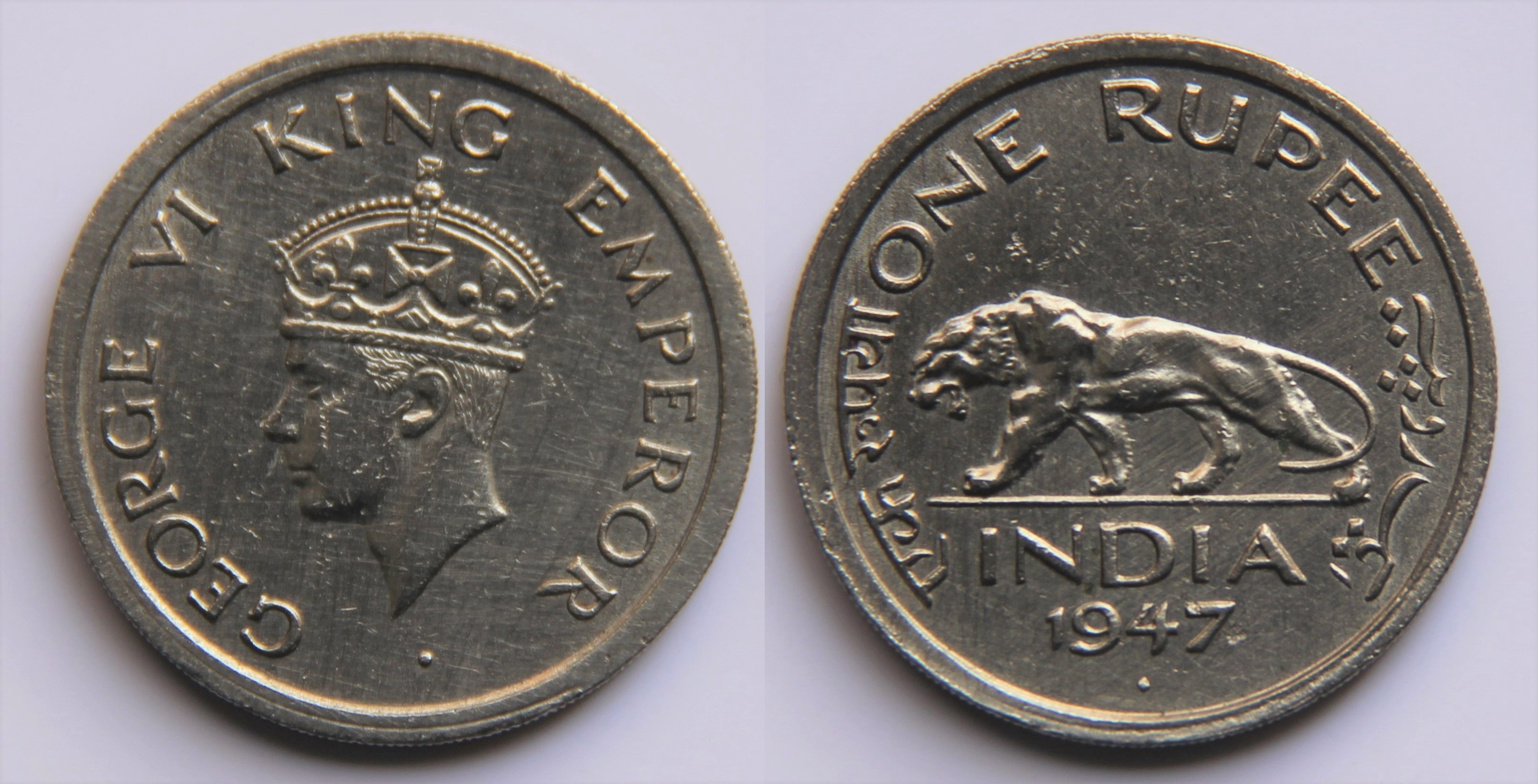
First side of the image: Obverse: Crowned head of George VI with lettering "GEORGE VI KING EMPEROR"
Second side of the image: Reverse: Bengal tiger with face value written in English, Hindi and Urdu, year and country
Metcalfe designed the obverse of this coin. 159,939,000 coins minted in 1947.

Metcalfe designed the first coinage of the Irish Free State in 1928. The first Irish coin series consisted of eight coins. The harp was chosen as the obverse. Metcalfe was chosen out of six designers as the winner of the reverse design of the Irish Free State's currency. The horse, salmon, bull, wolf-hound, hare, hen, pig and woodcock were all on different denominations of coinage that was known as the Barnyard Collection.

Metcalfe's design based on the Trinity College harp was adopted as the basis for the Great Seal of the Irish Free State in 1923 and has remained the model for all official representations of the harp emblem on seals of state, Irish coinage and the coat of arms.

As a result of the war from 1914 to 1918, the price of silver in the United Kingdom grew dramatically, until in 1920 British "silver" coins were worth less than the silver. Therefore, a degraded silver coinage was issued containing only fifty per cent silver. In 1935, it was George V's jubilee, and to celebrate the occasion, a crown piece containing a new design was issued. The reverse side of the coin depicts an image of St George on a horse, rearing over a dragon. Due to its modernistic design by Metcalfe it has earned little credit from collectors.

In 1936, Metcalfe designed the obverse crowned effigy of Edward VIII for overseas coinage which was approved by the King, but none was minted for circulation before Edward's abdication that December.

Metcalfe was immediately assigned to produce a similar crowned portrait of King George VI for overseas use. This image was also used as part of the George Cross design in 1940. The George Cross is second in the order of wear in the United Kingdom honours system and is the highest gallantry award for civilians, as well as for members of the armed forces in actions for which purely military honours would not normally be granted. It also features on the flag of Malta in recognition of the island's bravery during the Siege of Malta in World War II. Metcalfe also designed the Great Seal of the Realm. He produced designs for coinage of several countries including Ireland and Australia. He created a portrait of King George V which was used as the obverse for coins of Australia, Canada, Fiji, Mauritius, New Zealand and Southern Rhodesia.

To commemorate the extraordinary visit that George VI and Queen Elizabeth set out on to North America in 1939, three series of medallions were designed for the Royal Canadian Mint. The reverse side of the coins contained a joint profile of George VI and Queen Elizabeth, which was designed by Metcalfe. This design was also used on the British Coronation Medal of 1937.

Metcalfe created a British Jubilee crown piece, which was exhibited in the Leeds College of Art in November 1946.

=== Other work ===
In the 1930s, Metcalfe designed car mascots.

He produced many designs for Ashtead Pottery between 1923 and 1936.

One of his sculptural works is the bronze war memorial in Durban, South Africa.

=== Posthumous use of designs ===
In 2010, the Central Bank of Ireland issued euro coins featuring Metcalfe's Irish coin designs, specifically the salmon and horse design, with slight modifications to represent the "new generation". This was the first time his work was presented on the euro currency.

This selection of coins is a second series of three limited edition annual mint coin sets issued by the Central Bank in honour of animals that have previously appeared on Irish coinage. The first set featured the horse while the third in the series will pay tribute to the hound. Each set in the series is followed by a silver proof €15 coin. Along with the horse and the hound, the series of coins pays tribute to three animals which have important historical connections with Ireland.

== Works ==
Barnyard Collection. Irish Free State Currency

| Name | Numeral | Reverse design | Image |
|---|---|---|---|
| Farthing | ¼d | Woodcock | |
| Halfpenny | ½d | Pig and piglets | |
| Penny | d | Hen and chicks | |
| Threepence | 3d | Hare | |
| Sixpence | 6d | Wolfhound | |
| Shilling | 1s | Bull | |
| Florin | 2s | Salmon | |
| Half crown | 2s6d | Horse | |

=== Other coin designs ===
| Name | Location | Comments | Image |
|---|---|---|---|
| Barnyard Collection | Irish Free State | Percy Metcalfe is known for designing the first set of Irish Free State coinage released in 1926. He won a competition over a few other artists. This coinage has barnyard animals on each coin and is called the 'Barnyard Set'. | The coin set is above this table. |
| Egypt coinage | Egypt | Metcalfe was assigned by the Royal Mint to design a coin for the King Farouk; his initials 'PM' can be seen in the bottom middle of the coin. | |
| Iraq King coin set | Iraq | Metcalfe created coin effigies of two kings of Iraq. His portrait of King Faisal I first appeared on the coins of Iraq in 1931, whilst his portrait of King Ghazi was first seen on coins in 1936. This is a coin of King Ghazi. | |
