= Harold Stabler =

English ceramicist and metalwork designer (1872–1945)

- Born: June 10, 1872; Levens, Westmorland
- Died: April 11, 1945 (aged 72); Hammermill
- Occupations: Artist, silversmith
- Spouse: Phoebe McLeish (married 1906)

Harold Stabler FRSA (10 June 1872 – 11 April 1945) was a designer and craftsman in silver, enamels, pottery, glass and other materials. The Times described him as "one of the most capable industrial artists of his generation, and a successful teacher".

== Life and career ==
Ventilation Grilles on Piccadilly line

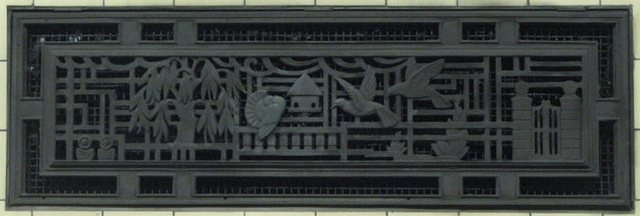
Manor House

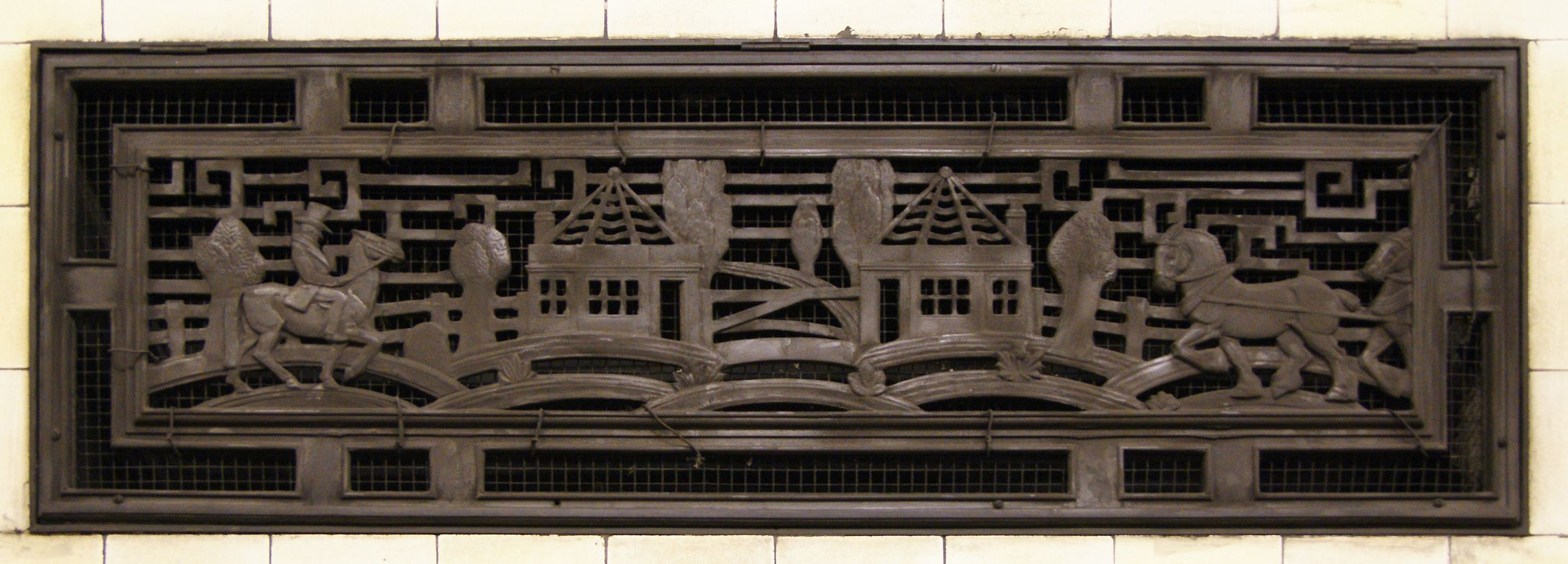
Turnpike Lane

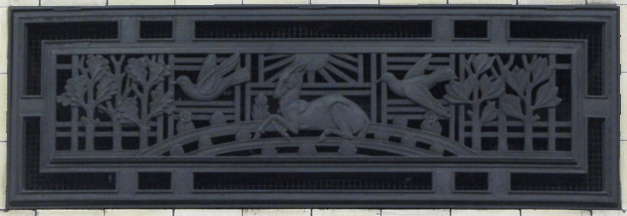
Wood Green

Stabler was born in Levens, Westmorland, the son of George Stabler, a schoolmaster. He was educated at Heversham Grammar School, and was then apprenticed to a wood-carver in Kendal for seven years, after which he went to the art department of Liverpool University. He moved to London in his twenties, settling in the Hammersmith area associated with William Morris and his followers. From 1898 to 1900 he was manager of the Keswick School of Industrial Art. From 1907 to 1937 he was head of the art department of the Sir John Cass Institute, and from 1912 to 1926 he was also on the teaching staff of the Royal College of Art.

As a craftsman, Stabler first made his name as an enameller. He exhibited at the Royal Academy in 1916, 1917 and later. His designs included a silver and enamel mace for Westminster Cathedral, the ceremonial collar of the Royal Victorian Order, and works for the Goldsmiths' Company. He did not confine himself to hand-crafted works. According to an obituarist, "In pottery, glass, and silver he designed for mass production by partly mechanical means with conspicuous success". His work included designs for Pyrex glass. For London Transport he designed posters and decorative work including a London-themed set of tiles used on the wall tiling of some new stations. (Note: Stabler's set of tiles for London Transport comprised 18 designs: Underground roundel, Houses of Parliament, the Crystal Palace, St Paul's Cathedral, 55 Broadway, River Thames (Swans over water), Thomas Lord, and symbols taken from the Heraldic emblems of City of London (Dragon), County of London (Lion inside a cross above water) Surrey (Coronet and oak leaves), Middlesex (Crown over three heraldic seaxes), Bedfordshire (Eagle with castle, from the arms of Bedford), Hertfordshire (Reclining stag next to water), Kent (Rampant horse), Sussex (Five martlets), Berkshire (Five maidens, from the arms of Reading), Buckinghamshire (Swan) and Essex (three heraldic seaxes).) His obituarist in the Journal of the Royal Society of Arts regarded Stabler as a considerable influence on London Transport's chief executive, Frank Pick. Stabler was one of the founders of the Design and Industries Association, and was elected a Fellow of the Royal Society of Arts in 1938.

In 1906 he married Phoebe McLeish, a sculptor who collaborated with him in some of his decorative work.

Stabler died in Hammersmith on 11 April 1945, aged 72.

== Notes, references and sources ==
=== Sources ===
- Badsey-Ellis, Antony (2012). Underground Heritage. unspecified: Capital Transport. ISBN 978-185414-360-0.
- Griffiths, Vivian (2020). "Canon Hardwicke Rawnsley". The Three Founders of the National Trust. London: Pitkin. ISBN 978-1-84165-898-8.
