= Sixpence (Irish coin) =

Denomination of the pre-decimal Irish pound

Sixpence / Reul
- Ireland
- Value: 6 pence
- Mass: 4.53 g
- Diameter: 21.0 mm
- Thickness: 1.9 mm
- Edge: Plain
- Composition: Nickel (1928–1942); Cupronickel (1942–1969)
- Years of minting: 1928–1969
- Catalog number: —

Obverse
- Design: Irish harp
- Design date: 1928

Reverse
- Design: Irish Wolfhound
- Designer: Percy Metcalfe
- Design date: 1928

The sixpence (6d; Irish: réal or reul Irish pronunciation: [ɾˠeːlˠ] RALE) coin was a subdivision of the pre-decimal Irish pound, worth 1/40 of a pound or 1/2 of a shilling. The Irish name réal is derived from the Spanish real; for most of the 19th century, a pound sterling was equal to five U.S. dollars, and a dollar was equal to eight reales, so that a real was equal to 1/40 of a pound. The variant spelling reul was used in the Coinage Act 1926, and appeared on the coins themselves even after a 1947 spelling reform established réal as the standard.

The coin was originally struck in nickel, like the threepence coin, and was very well wearing. The metal was changed to cupronickel in 1942 as nickel increased in value; this coin, which consisted of 75% copper and 25% nickel, was not as well-wearing. The coin measured 0.825 inches (21.0 mm) in diameter and a weighed 4.53593 grams.

Five early coins were minted featuring a design by Publio Morbiducci, which depict the Wolfhound's head looking back; these coins are quite valuable, estimated at several thousand euro – they remain in the hands of collectors and were never released to circulation.

The general design of the coin was by English artist Percy Metcalfe. His designs had been selected by a panel from those submitted by a number of sculptors who had been invited to create designs for the coinage of the new Irish Free State. The brief for the design of the sixpence was that it feature an Irish Wolfhound. The obverse featured the Irish harp. From 1928 to 1937 the date was split either side of the harp with the name Saorstát Éireann circling around. From 1938 to 1969 the inscription changed to Éire on the left of the harp and the date on the right. It has been suggested by some that the dog depicted is Master McGrath, a famous coursing greyhound raised in County Waterford. Although the frieze of Master McGrath on the Master McGrath monument in Waterford, the only public monument in Ireland to a greyhound, does bear some similarity to Metcalfe's design, there is no evidence to suggest that the animal on the coin is anything other than a wolfhound, as greyhounds are not native to Ireland.

It was expected that this coin would circulate alongside the new decimal coins, with a value of 2 1/2 new pence as in the United Kingdom. With this in mind the Central Bank of Ireland continued to have the coin minted, last dated 1969, while minting decimal coins. However, the coin ended up being withdrawn instead, never to become a decimal-based coin; it remains the last pre-decimal coin to come off the production run. In 1990 it was announced that the decimal penny would be redesigned to incorporate the wolfhound design, but this plan was abandoned in the face of the imminent adoption of the Euro.

== See also ==
- £sd
