= Poole Pottery =

British pottery brand

- Current owner: Denby Pottery Company
- Country: Poole, Dorset, England.
- Introduced: 1873
- Previous owners: 1999–2001 Orb Estates Ltd; 2002–2006 Peter Ford; 2006 Zemmel & Symonds; 2007–2011 Lifestyle Group Ltd
- Website: www.poolepottery.co.uk

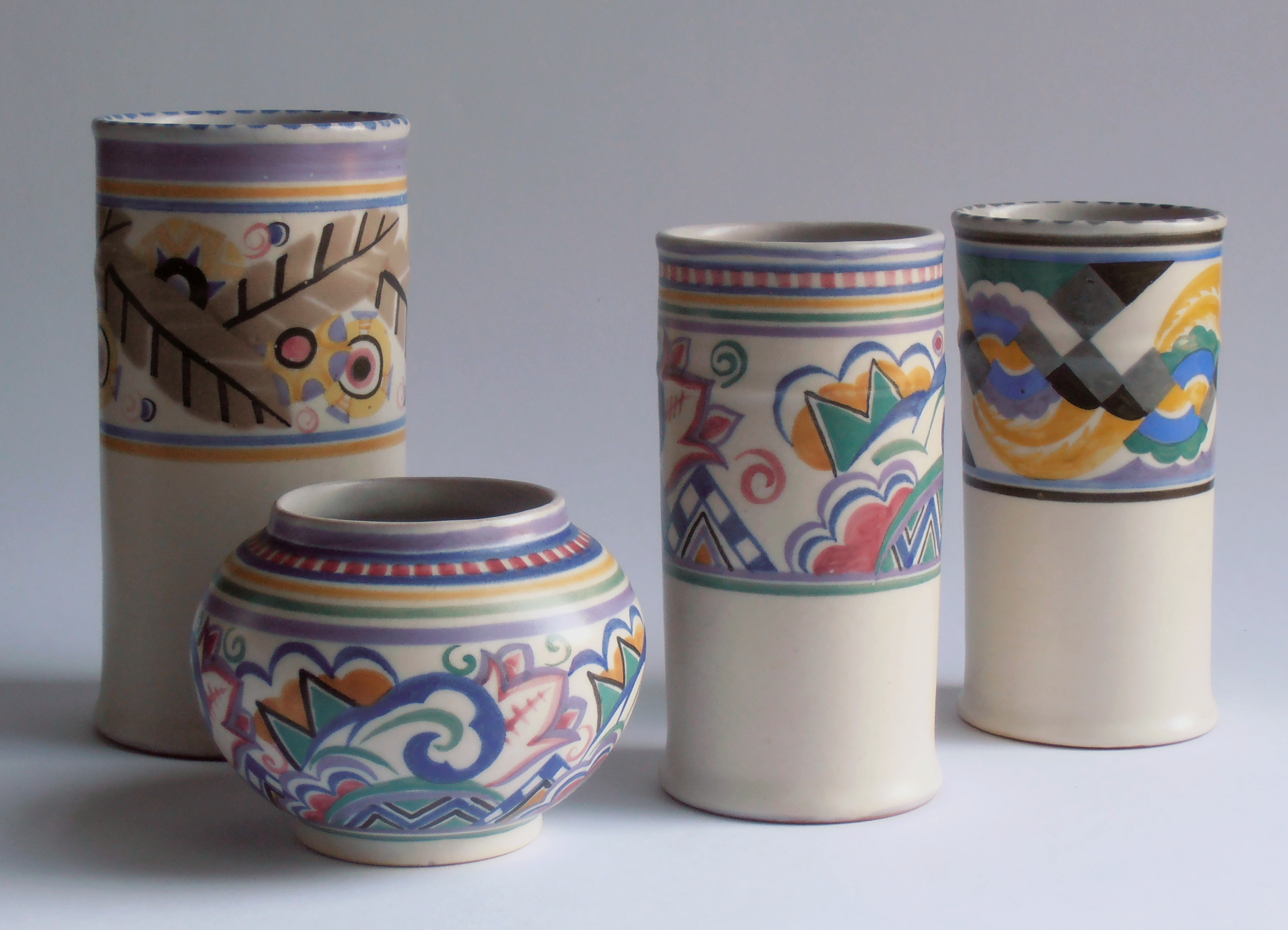
Art Deco Poole Pottery designed by Truda Carter, 1920s or 1930s.

Poole Pottery is a British pottery brand owned by Denby Pottery Company, with the products made in Stoke on Trent, Staffordshire.

It was founded as a manufacturer in 1873 on Poole quayside in Dorset where it produced pottery, before moving its factory operations in 1999 to a new site in Sopers Lane until its closure in 2006. They generally specialised in earthenware, although other bodies such as stoneware were periodically produced.

Historical products from Poole Pottery are displayed in museums including the Victoria and Albert Museum in London.

== History ==
Poole Pottery was originally "Carter's Industrial Tile Manufactory" and it was this company that provided the financial foundation for the later "Poole Pottery". Carter (Jesse) joined forces in the 1920s with designers Harold Stabler and Phoebe Stabler, and potters John Adams and Truda Adams (Truda Carter) to form "Carter Stabler Adams", who produced Art Deco pottery.

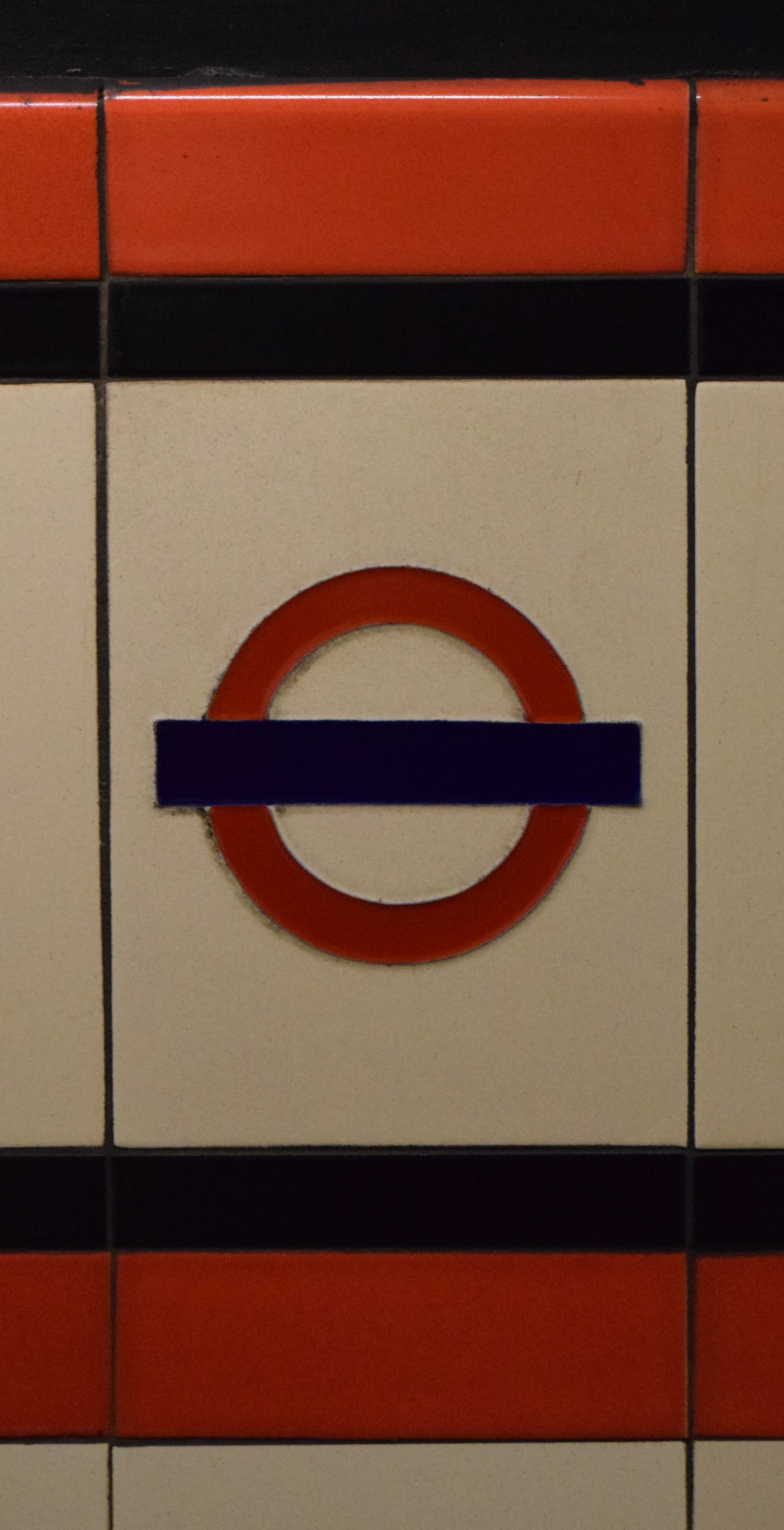
Tiling detail, Bethnal Green tube station, platform frieze.

The Carter company produced much of the ceramic tiling used on London Underground stations built in the 1930s and, of particular note, made the relief tiles, designed by Stabler, showing symbols of London–some of these can still be seen on stations such as Bethnal Green.

"Carter Stabler Adams" eventually became "Poole Pottery", and during and after World War II produced many lines, including Twintone and Traditional. Much of the traditional range was based on the work of the chief designer in the 1920s, Truda Carter; her original designs were interpreted by "paintresses" who added their own individuality to the pieces, all of which were handmade.

Design by Robert Jefferson

Robert Jefferson joined in the 1950s, and alongside such artisans as Leslie Elsden (designer of the "Aegean" Range), Guy Sydenham, thrower and designer of the "Atlantis" range, Tony Morris, developer of the early "Delphis" Studio wares with Jefferson, and paintresses such as Carol Cutler, Diana Davies, Ros Sommerfeld, Ann Godfrey and others, including the three Wills sisters, Laura, Julia and Carolyn, produced two lines which are probably the most famous of all Poole's output: Delphis and Aegean.

Delphis is easily recognised: it is psychedelic, with vibrant colours and designs inspired by artists such as Mondrian, Warhol, Matisse and Pollock. Aegean is more subtle, with the sgraffito technique used to create the "silhouette" patterns that make this range so recognisable.

=== Twintone ===
Poole Pottery (Carter, Stabler and Adams) produced two-coloured tableware from the 1930s, but had to stop production during World War Two. When they re-launched the range in the late 1940s, they named it Twintone. Twintone was used on three shapes of tableware, many table accessories and a whole host of decorative ware right up to 1981.

=== Delphis ===
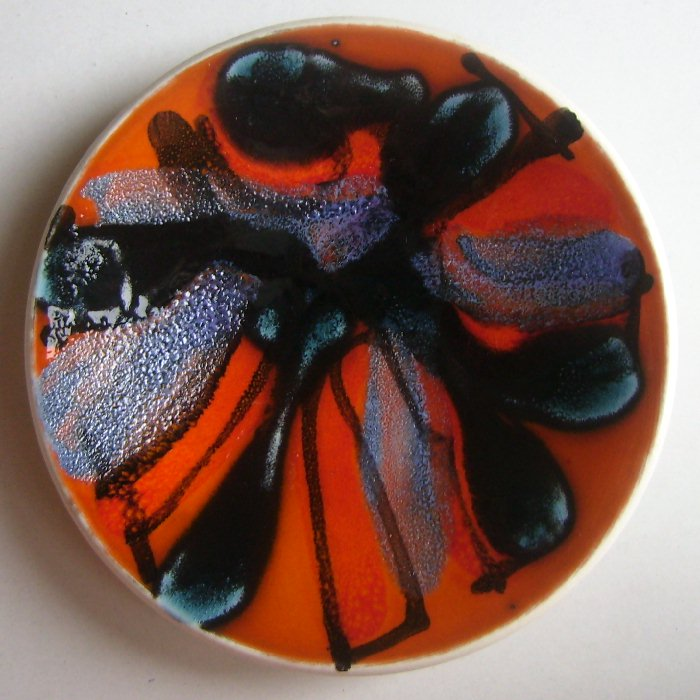
Poole Delphis no.49 pin dish Jean Millership

The Poole Delphis range, launched in 1963, was initially conceived by Guy Sydenham and Robert Jefferson and later developed by Jefferson and Tony Morris. Every piece is pretty much unique, with designs created by the decorators themselves.

=== Aegean ===
Introduced in 1970, Aegean utilises spray-on glazes in a wide range of techniques (sgraffito, silhouette, mosaic, flow line and carved clay) and patterns (from pure 1970's abstraction to more figurative images of fish, leaves, boats and pastoral scenes). Initially thought of as a replacement for Delphis, it was never as successful.

=== Living Glaze ===
Poole Pottery giftware is currently created using "Living Glaze". This involves the application of different glazes which react with one another to achieve unique results on each piece.

== Closure and re-establishment ==
Leonard Curtis were appointed administrators in 2003, and sold the company as a going concern to Dorset businessman Peter Ford. They also raised funds for creditors by selling historic artefacts from the Pottery's museum.

On 15 December 2006, it was announced that the shop would close, due to non-payment of debts mounting up since new owners took over in August. The company, including the factory, went into administration on 20 December 2006, owing £1 million to over 300 creditors.

Poole Pottery came out of administration on 10 February 2007 and was under the control of Lifestyle Group Ltd, which also owns Royal Stafford Tableware.

The pottery shop opened on Poole Quay, selling Poole Pottery giftware (first and seconds), lighting, tableware and studio ranges. The shop closed down in 2017.

The main Poole Pottery factory is now at the Middleport Pottery (sharing with Burleigh Pottery) in Burslem, Stoke on Trent where production is now carried out following the closure of the Poole factory.

In June 2011, the Denby Pottery Company under the ownership of Hilco bought Poole Pottery.

== See also ==
- Poole Museum (Dorset)
