= Aberystwyth University Ceramics Collection =

Ceramics collection in Ceredigion, Wales

Coordinates: 52.4156°N 4.0630°W

Ceramic Collection and Archive
- Casgliad ac Archif Cerameg

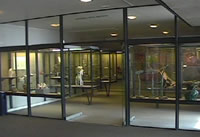
- Front entrance, Ceramic Gallery, Aberystwyth Arts Centre
- Established: 1920s (Collection); 1980s (Archive)
- Location: Aberystwyth, Wales
- Visitors: Free entry
- Curator: Prof. Moira Vincentelli
- Parking: Available nearby
- Website: http://www.ceramics-aberystwyth.com/

The Aberystwyth University Ceramic Collection & Archive is located in Aberystwyth, Wales. It holds one of the major collections of studio ceramics in Britain and is particularly noted for its studio pottery of the period 1920–1940. The permanent and temporary exhibitions from the collection are on display in the Ceramic Gallery in Aberystwyth Arts Centre and the archive office is located in the School of Art, Aberystwyth University. The Ceramic Bulletin is produced every two years by the university and it features news of activities including exhibitions, new acquisitions, research, awards and grants.

== Ceramic Collection ==
The main collection was formed between 1920–1936 and since 1974 there has again been an active acquisitions policy and there is now a major collection of contemporary ceramics. The collection also includes a fine body of nineteenth century slipware and examples of work from many periods, from archaeological specimens to Welsh porcelain of Nantgarw and Swansea. In 1986 the display area was extended and a purpose-built gallery was created on the ground floor of Aberystwyth Arts Centre. The principal parts of the collection are permanently on display in the back gallery while the front gallery is used for changing displays and exhibitions from the permanent collection and touring exhibitions. The collections have been supported in recent years by funding from Arts Council of Wales, the Council of Museums in Wales, by loans of work by the Crafts Council and by purchase grant funding from the Victoria and Albert Purchase Grant Fund and the Art Fund. There is a regular schools and family learning program run in conjunction with Aberystwyth Arts Centre.

== Ceramic Archive ==
The Ceramic Archive was developed in the late 1980s, when a new home was needed for the Craft Potters Association archive, which was initiated in the early 1970s by Robert Fournier, a CPA member. The aim was to collect documents which would maintain a record of the origins, organisation, activities and development of the Craft Potters Association (founded in 1958). By 1988, the CPA archive had grown into a substantial body of material which needed a more permanent and larger location, and its holdings were offered and accepted by Aberystwyth University Ceramic Archive, based at the School of Art, Aberystwyth. The main paper documents in the Ceramic Archive were deposited in the National Library of Wales in 1997. However, any information relating directly to the makers in the Ceramic Collection was retained at Aberystwyth University Ceramic Archive.

=== Archive Content ===
- Files containing published information on all makers in the collection
- Back catalogues of published material on British ceramics
- Auction catalogues
- A worldwide range of reference books
- An extensive range of foreign journals
- British ceramic exhibition catalogues
- A collection of audio-visual material relating to ceramics and studio pottery
- Ceramic Series- almost one hundred articles commissioned by Aberystwyth Arts Centre
- Documents and photographs relating to the International Ceramics Festival
- Documents relating to the Craft Potters Association
- Documents relating to the touring exhibitions of the collection
- Documents relating to educational courses/modules in ceramics (including Aberystwyth University)
- Administrative documents
