= Flag of Middlesex =

Flag of English county

Middlesex
- Banner of arms of Middlesex County Council
- Proportion: 3:5
- Adopted: 1909
- Design: Gold crown and three short notched seaxes on a red background
- Designed by: Traditional

The flag of Middlesex is the flag of the English county of Middlesex. It is the traditional flag of Middlesex, the historic county that forms the central and north-west parts of Greater London. This traditional design is included in the Flag Institute's registry of local flags as the Middlesex Flag.

On Middlesex Day (16 May) in 2022, the Middlesex Flag was flown over 10 Downing Street, the official residence of the prime minister of the United Kingdom, being flown again on the same day in 2023 and 2024.

== Flag design ==
The flag is a banner of the arms of the former Middlesex County Council, abolished in 1965. Whilst such banners of county arms are legally not generally available for public use, a similar design, with Anglo-Saxon Seaxes had been used traditionally as a local badge in Middlesex and neighbouring Essex for centuries.

The pantone colours for the flag are:

- Red 485
- White
- Yellow 116
