= Claire O'Kelly =

Irish archaeologist and writer

Claire O'Kelly FSA
- Claire O'Kelly in the 1940s
- Born: Claire O'Donovan; 21 July 1916; Cork, Ireland
- Died: 23 October 2004 (aged 88); Dublin, Ireland
- Education: University College Cork
- Occupation: Archaeologist
- Notable work: Established the importance of the solstice connection of Newgrange
- Spouse: Michael J. O'Kelly (m. 1945; died 1982)
- Children: 3

Claire O'Kelly FSA (née O'Donovan, 21 July 1916 – 23 October 2004) was an Irish archaeologist, notable as the first person to write up an accessible account of Irish archaeological sites. She was key to the realisation of the importance of the solstice connection of the Newgrange structure, and the first person to create a full collection of drawings of the decorated stones of Newgrange.

== Career ==
Claire O'Donovan was born in Cork to Edward and Johanna O'Donovan, on 21 July 1916. She became a national school teacher until she went to University College Cork in the 1930s, studying archaeology under Professor Seán P. Ó. Ríordáin. She met her future husband, Michael J. O'Kelly, known to family as Brian, while in college, and together they were involved in work on many of Ireland's historical sites, and on the setting up of the Cork Public Museum in 1945.

O'Kelly used her fluency in Irish and her knowledge of archaeology to create the necessary archaeological terms for the definitive English/Irish Dictionary edited by Tomás de Bháldraithe.

She was behind the research which led to the discovery of Newgrange's solar importance, made drawings of the stones of the Boyne Valley sites, most notably Newgrange, and published accessible texts on Newgrange and Dowth.

O'Kelly wrote several books for public understanding on the history and importance of Irish sites, and her content is used for the website of Newgrange, for example, even today. Her significance in archaeology and history was recognised when she was elected a Fellow of the Society of Antiquaries of London in 1984.

O'Kelly was also involved in artistic Irish life. She was friends with Gabriel Hayes, the wife of O'Kelly's university tutor Seán P. Ó. Ríordáin, who used her hands as the models for the stations of the cross in Galway cathedral.

She had three daughters and, having survived her husband, died aged 88 in Dublin, and was buried in Cork.

== Bibliography ==
- Illustrated Guide to Newgrange, 1967
- Passage-grave Art in the Boyne Vall ey, 1975
- Concise Guide to Newgrange,1976
- Three Passage Graves at Newgrange, Co Meath, 1978
- Illustrated Guide to Newgrange and other Boyne Monuments, 1978
- Illustrated Guide to Lough Gur Co. Limerick, 1978
- Newgrange: Archaeology, Art and Legend ,1982
- Early Ireland, An Introduction to Irish Prehistory, 1989
