= Middle High German =

Historical form of High German

- diutsch / tiutsch
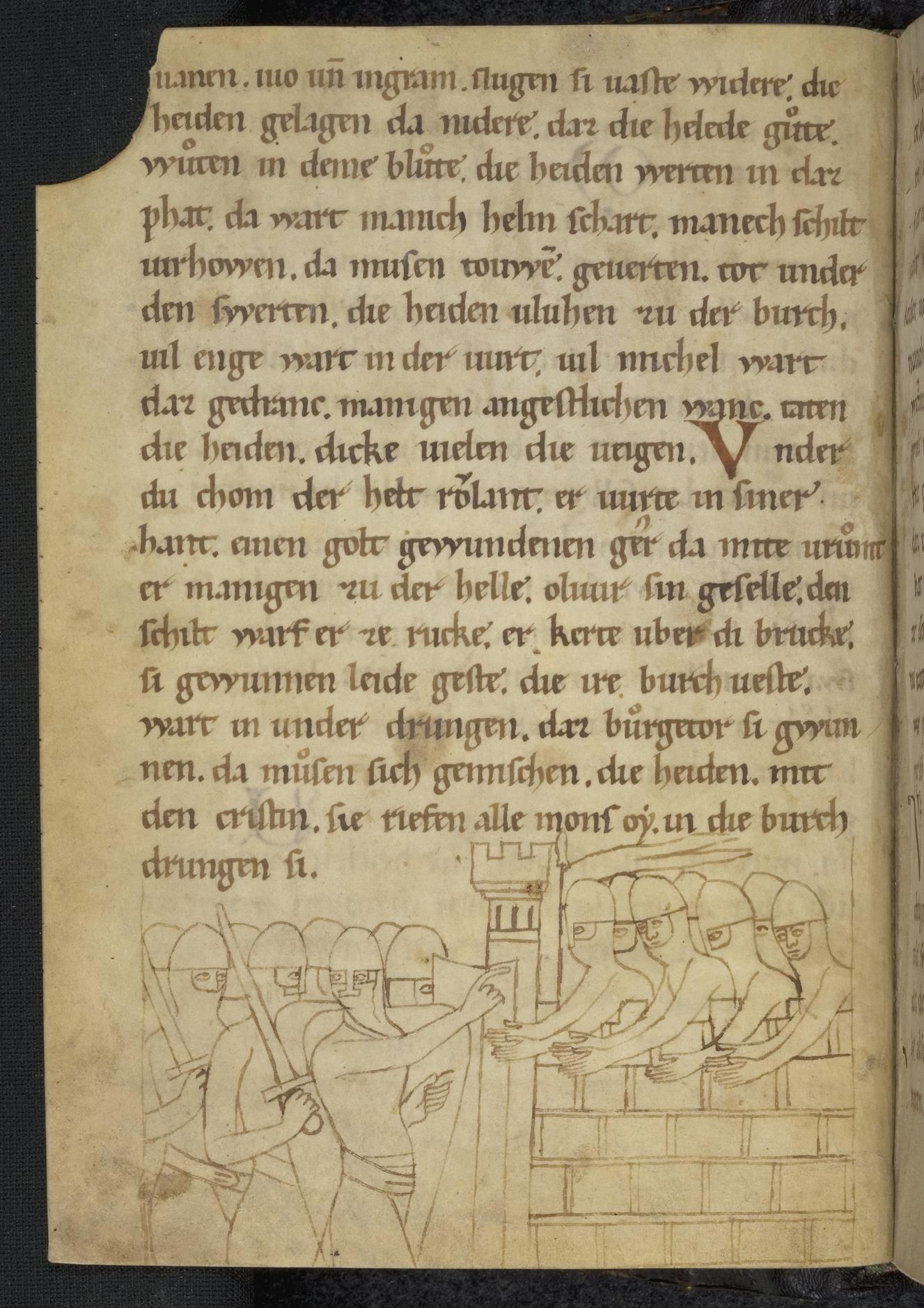
- Manuscript page from Rolandslied, written in Middle High German in the 12th century
- Region: Central and southern Germany, Austria and parts of Switzerland
- Era: High Middle Ages
- Language family: Indo-European: Germanic; West Germanic; High German; Middle High German
- Early form: Old High German
- Writing system: Latin

Language codes
- ISO 639-2: gmh (c. 1050–1500)
- ISO 639-3: gmh (c. 1050–1500)
- ISO 639-6: mdgr
- Glottolog: midd1343

Middle High German (MHG; endonym: diutsch or tiutsch; New High German: Mittelhochdeutsch [ˈmɪtl̩hoːxˌdɔʏtʃ], shortened as Mhdt. or Mhd.) is the term for the form of High German spoken in the High Middle Ages. It is conventionally dated between 1050 and 1350, developing from Old High German (OHG) into Early New High German (ENHG). High German is defined as those varieties of German which were affected by the Second Sound Shift; the Middle Low German (MLG) and Middle Dutch languages spoken to the North and North West, which did not participate in this sound change, are not part of MHG.

While there is no standard MHG, the prestige of the Hohenstaufen court gave rise in the late 12th century to a supra-regional literary language (mittelhochdeutsche Dichtersprache) based on Swabian, an Alemannic dialect. This historical interpretation is complicated by the tendency of modern editions of MHG texts to use normalised spellings based on this variety (usually called "Classical MHG"), which make the written language appear more consistent than it actually is in the manuscripts. Scholars are uncertain as to whether the literary language reflected a supra-regional spoken language of the courts.

An important development in this period was the Ostsiedlung, the eastward expansion of German settlement beyond the Elbe-Saale line which marked the limit of Old High German. This process started in the 11th century, and all the East Central German dialects are a result of this expansion.

"Judeo-German", the precursor of the Yiddish language, is attested in the 12th–13th centuries, as a variety of Middle High German written in Hebrew characters.

== Periodisation ==
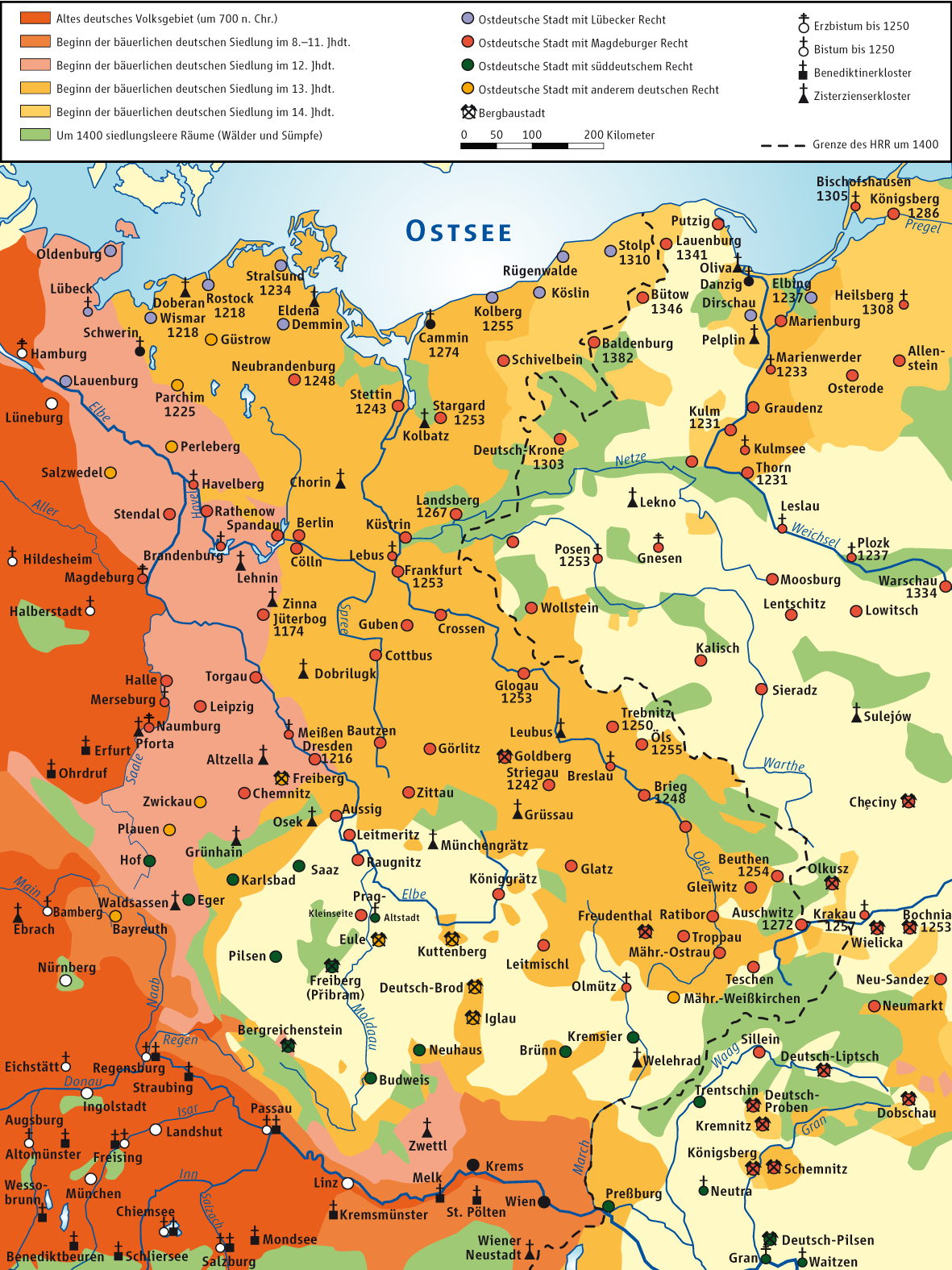
German territorial expansion in the Middle High German period (adapted from Walter Kuhn) Germanic peoples before AD 700 Ostsiedlung, 8th–11th centuries Expansion in the 12th century Expansion in the 13th century Expansion in the 14th century

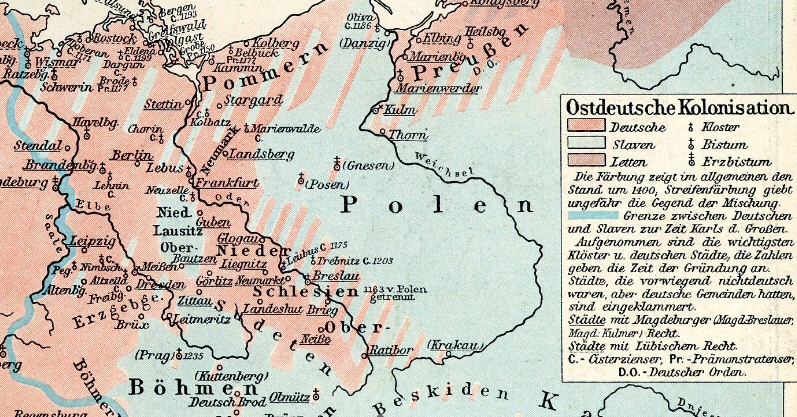
German territorial expansion before 1400 from F. W. Putzger

The Middle High German period is generally dated from 1050 to 1350. An older view puts the boundary with (Early) New High German around 1500.

There are several phonological criteria which separate MHG from the preceding Old High German period:

- the weakening of unstressed vowels to ⟨e⟩: OHG taga, MHG tage ("days")
- the full development of umlaut and its use to mark a number of morphological categories
- the devoicing of final stops: OHG tag > MHG tac ("day")

Culturally, the two periods are distinguished by the transition from a predominantly clerical written culture, in which the dominant language was Latin, to one centred on the courts of the great nobles, with German gradually expanding its range of use. The rise of the Hohenstaufen dynasty in Swabia makes the South West the dominant region in both political and cultural terms.

Demographically, the MHG period is characterised by a massive rise in population, terminated by the demographic catastrophe of the Black Death (1348). Along with the rise in population comes a territorial expansion eastwards (Ostsiedlung), which saw German-speaking settlers colonise land previously under Slavic control.

Linguistically, the transition to Early New High German is marked by four vowel changes which together produce the phonemic system of modern German, though not all dialects participated equally in these changes:

- Diphthongisation of the long high vowels /iː yː uː/ > /aɪ̯ ɔʏ̯ aʊ̯/: MHG hût > NHG Haut ("skin")
- Monophthongisation of the high centering diphthongs /iə yə uə/ > /iː yː uː/: MHG huot > NHG Hut ("hat")
- lengthening of stressed short vowels in open syllables: MHG sagen /zaɡən/ > NHG sagen /zaːɡən/ ("say")
- The loss of unstressed vowels in many circumstances: MHG vrouwe > NHG Frau ("lady")

The centres of culture in the ENHG period are no longer the courts but the towns.

== Dialects ==
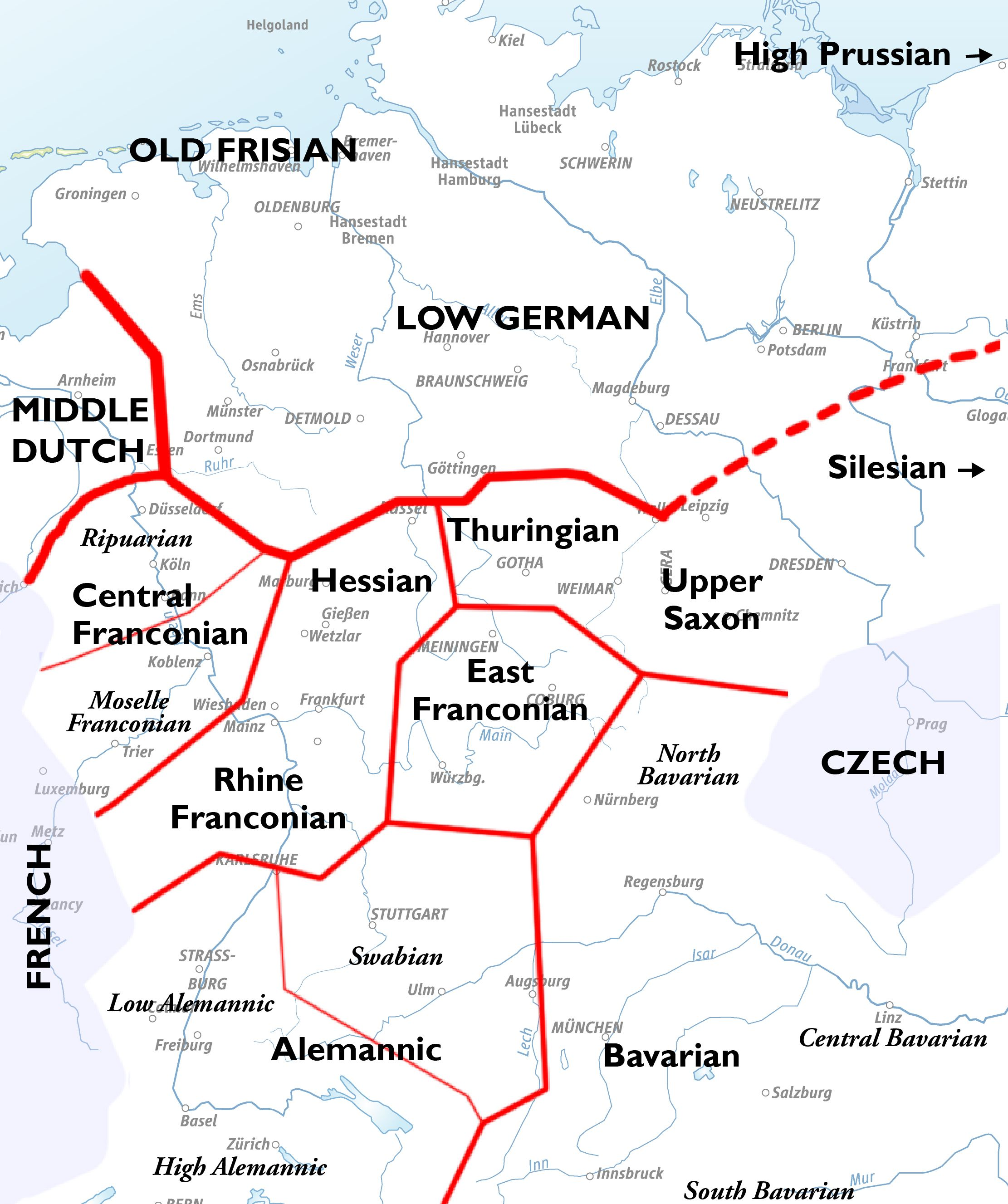
Middle High German dialect boundaries

The dialect map of Germany by the end of the Middle High German period was much the same as that at the start of the 20th century, though the boundary with Low German was further south than it now is:

Central German (Mitteldeutsch)

- West Central German (Westmitteldeutsch)
  - Central Franconian (Mittelfränkisch)
    - Ripuarian (Ripuarisch)
    - Moselle Franconian (Moselfränkisch)
  - Rhine Franconian (Rheinfränkisch)
  - Hessian (Hessisch)
- East Central German (Ostmitteldeutsch)
  - Thuringian (Thüringisch)
  - Upper Saxon (Obersächsisch)
  - Silesian (Schlesisch)
  - High Prussian (Hochpreußisch)

Upper German (Oberdeutsch)

- East Franconian (Ostfränkisch)
- South Rhine Franconian (Süd(rhein)fränkisch)
- Alemannic (Alemannisch)
  - North Alemannic (Nordalemannisch)
    - Swabian (Schwäbisch)
    - Low Alemannic (Niederalemannisch/Oberrheinisch)
  - High Alemannic/South Alemannic (Hochalemannisch/Südalemannisch) )
- Bavarian (Bairisch)
  - Northern Bavarian (Nordbairisch)
  - Central Bavarian (Mittelbairisch)
  - Southern Bavarian (Südbairisch)

With the exception of Thuringian, the East Central German dialects are new dialects resulting from the Ostsiedlung and arise towards the end of the period.

== Writing system ==
Middle High German texts are written in the Latin alphabet. There was no standardised spelling, but modern editions generally standardise according to a set of conventions established by Karl Lachmann in the 19th century. There are several important features in this standardised orthography which are not characteristics of the original manuscripts:

- the marking of vowel length is almost entirely absent from MHG manuscripts.
- the marking of umlauted vowels is often absent or inconsistent in the manuscripts.
- a curly-tailed z (⟨ȥ⟩ or ⟨ʒ⟩) is used in modern handbooks and grammars to indicate the /s/ or /s/-like sound which arose from Germanic /t/ in the High German consonant shift. This character has no counterpart in the original manuscripts, which typically use ⟨s⟩ or ⟨z⟩ to indicate this sound.
- the original texts often use ⟨i⟩ and ⟨uu⟩ for the semi-vowels /j/ and /w/.

A particular problem is that many manuscripts are of much later date than the works they contain; as a result, they bear the signs of later scribes having modified the spellings, with greater or lesser consistency, in accord with conventions of their time. In addition, there is considerable regional variation in the spellings that appear in the original texts, which modern editions largely conceal.

=== Vowels ===
The standardised orthography of MHG editions uses the following vowel spellings:

- Short vowels: ⟨a e i o u⟩ and the umlauted vowels ⟨ä ö ü⟩
- Long vowels: ⟨â ê î ô û⟩ and the umlauted vowels ⟨æ œ iu⟩
- Diphthongs: ⟨ei ou ie uo⟩; and the umlauted diphthongs ⟨öu eu oi üe⟩

Grammars (as opposed to textual editions) often distinguish between ⟨ë⟩ and ⟨e⟩, the former indicating the mid-open /ɛ/ which derived from Germanic /e/, the latter (often with a dot beneath it) indicating the mid-close /e/ which results from primary umlaut of short /a/. No such orthographic distinction is made in MHG manuscripts.

=== Consonants ===
The standardised orthography of MHG editions uses the following consonant spellings:

- Stops: ⟨p t k/c/q b d g⟩
- Affricates: ⟨pf/ph tz/z⟩
- Fricatives: ⟨v f s ȥ sch ch h⟩
- Nasals: ⟨m n⟩
- Liquids: ⟨l r⟩
- Semivowels: ⟨w j⟩

== Phonology ==
The charts show the vowel and consonant systems of classical MHG. The spellings indicated are the standard spellings used in modern editions; there is much more variation in the manuscripts.

=== Vowels ===
==== Short and long vowels ====
	Front				Back	
	Unrounded		Rounded		Back	
	short	long	short	long	short	long
close	i ⟨i⟩	iː ⟨î⟩	y ⟨ü⟩	yː ⟨iu⟩	u ⟨u⟩	uː ⟨û⟩
close-mid	e ⟨e⟩	eː ⟨ê⟩	ø ⟨ö⟩	øː ⟨œ⟩	o ⟨o⟩	oː ⟨ô⟩
mid	ɛ ⟨ë⟩		ø ⟨ö⟩	øː ⟨œ⟩	o ⟨o⟩	oː ⟨ô⟩
open	æ ⟨ä⟩	æː ⟨æ⟩			a ⟨a⟩	aː ⟨â⟩

Notes:

1. Not all dialects distinguish the three unrounded mid front vowels.
2. It is probable that the short high and mid vowels are lower than their long equivalents, as in Modern German, but that is impossible to establish from the written sources.
3. The ⟨e⟩ found in unstressed syllables may indicate [ɛ] or schwa [ə].

==== Diphthongs ====
	Front		Back
	Unrounded	Rounded	Back
Closing	/ei/	/øy/ ⟨öu/eu⟩	/ou/
Centering	/iə/ ⟨ie⟩	/yə/ ⟨üe⟩	/uə/ ⟨uo⟩

=== Consonants ===
	Labial	Coronal	Dorsal	Glottal
Nasal	m	n	ŋ ⟨ng⟩	
Plosive	p b	t d	k ⟨k, c⟩ ɡ	
Affricate	p͡f	t͡s ⟨z⟩		
Fricative	f ⟨f⟩ v ⟨v⟩	s ⟨ȥ⟩ s̠ ⟨s⟩	x ⟨ch, h⟩	h
Approximant	w	l r	j	

1. Precise information about the articulation of consonants is impossible to establish and must have varied between dialects.
2. In the plosive and fricative series, if there are two consonants in a cell, the first is fortis and the second lenis. The voicing of lenis consonants varied between dialects.
3. There are long consonants, and the following double consonant spellings indicate not vowel length, as they do in Modern German orthography, but rather genuine double consonants: pp, bb, tt, dd, ck (for /kk/), gg, ff, ss, zz, mm, nn, ll, rr.
4. It is reasonable to assume that /x/ has an allophone [χ] after back vowels, as in Modern German.
5. The original Germanic fricative s was in writing usually clearly distinguished from the younger fricative z that evolved from the High German consonant shift. The sounds of both letters seem not to have merged before the 13th century. Since s later came to be pronounced /ʃ/ before other consonants (as in Stein /ʃtaɪn/, Speer /ʃpeːɐ/, Schmerz /ʃmɛrts/ (original smerz) or the southwestern pronunciation of words like Ast /aʃt/), it seems safe to assume that the actual pronunciation of Germanic s was somewhere between [s] and [ʃ], most likely about [s̠], in all Old High German until late Middle High German. A word like swaz, "whatever", would thus never have been [swas] but rather [s̠was], later (13th century) [ʃwas], [ʃvas]. Sequences of velar plus this older fricative also coalesced into a single long sound, as can be seen in modern German mischen /ˈmɪʃən/ 'to mix' with a short vowel and a single consonant originating from Old High German misken.

== Grammar ==
=== Pronouns ===
Middle High German pronouns of the first person refer to the speaker; those of the second person refer to an addressed person; and those of the third person refer to a person or thing of which one speaks. The pronouns of the third person may be used to replace nominal phrases. These have the same genders, numbers and cases as the original nominal phrase.

==== Personal pronouns ====
Personal Pronouns
	1st sg	2nd sg	3rd sg			1st pl	2nd pl	3rd pl
Nominative	ich	du	ër	siu	ëȥ	wir	ir	sie / siu
Accusative	mich	dich	in	sie	ëȥ	uns(ich)	iuch	sie / siu
Dative	mir	dir	im	ir	im	uns	iu	in
Genitive	mîn	dîn	sîn	ir	sîn	unser	iuwer	ir

==== Possessive pronouns ====
The possessive pronouns mîn, dîn, sîn, ir, unser, iuwer are used like adjectives and hence take on adjective endings following the normal rules.

=== Articles ===
The inflected forms of the article depend on the number, the case and the gender of the corresponding noun. The definite article has the same plural forms for all three genders.

Definite article (strong)

Case	Masculine	Neuter	Feminine	Plural
Nominative	dër	daȥ	diu	die / diu
Accusative	dën	daȥ	die	die / diu
Dative	dëm		dër	dën
Genitive	dës		dër	dër
Instrumental		diu		

The instrumental case, only existing in the neuter singular, is used only with prepositions: von diu, ze diu, etc. In all the other genders and in the plural it is substituted with the dative: von dëm, von dër, von dën.

=== Nouns ===
Middle High German nouns were declined according to four cases (nominative, genitive, dative, accusative), two numbers (singular and plural) and three genders (masculine, feminine and neuter), much like Modern High German, though there are several important differences.

==== Strong nouns ====
	dër tac day m.		diu gëbe gift f.		daȥ wort word n.	
	Singular	Plural	Singular	Plural	Singular	Plural
Nominative	dër tac	die tage	diu gëbe	die gëbe	daȥ wort	diu wort
Accusative	dën tac	die tage	die gëbe	die gëbe	daȥ wort	diu wort
Genitive	dës tages	dër tage	dër gëbe	dër gëben	dës wortes	dër worte
Dative	dëm tage	dën tagen	dër gëbe	dën gëben	dëm worte	dën worten

	dër gast guest m.		diu kraft strength f.		daȥ lamp lamb n.	
	Singular	Plural	Singular	Plural	Singular	Plural
Nominative	dër gast	die geste	diu kraft	die krefte	daȥ lamp	diu lember
Accusative	dën gast	die geste	die kraft	die krefte	daȥ lamp	diu lember
Genitive	dës gastes	dër geste	dër kraft/krefte	dër krefte	dës lambes	dër lember
Dative	dëm gaste	dën gesten	dër kraft/krefte	dën kreften	dëm lambe	dën lembern

==== Weak nouns ====
	dër veter (male) cousin m.		diu zunge tongue f.		daȥ herze heart n.	
	Singular	Plural	Singular	Plural	Singular	Plural
Nominative	dër veter	die veteren	diu zunge	die zungen	daȥ herze	diu herzen
Accusative	dën veteren	die veteren	die zungen	die zungen	daȥ herze	diu herzen
Genitive	dës veteren	dër veteren	dër zungen	dër zungen	dës herzen	dër herzen
Dative	dëm veteren	dën veteren	dër zungen	dën zungen	dëm herzen	dën herzen

=== Verbs ===
Verbs were conjugated according to three moods (indicative, subjunctive (conjunctive) and imperative), three persons, two numbers (singular and plural) and two tenses (present tense and preterite) There was a present participle, a past participle and a verbal noun that somewhat resembles the Latin gerund, but that only existed in the genitive and dative cases.

An important distinction is made between strong verbs (that exhibited ablaut) and weak verbs (that didn't).

Furthermore, there were also some irregular verbs.

==== Strong verbs ====
The present tense conjugation went as follows:

	nëmen to take	
	Indicative	Subjunctive
1. sg.	ich nime	ich nëme
2. sg.	du nim(e)st	du nëmest
3. sg.	ër nim(e)t	er nëme
1. pl.	wir nëmen	wir nëmen
2. pl.	ir nëm(e)t	ir nëmet
3. pl.	sie nëment	sie nëmen

- Imperative: 2.sg.: nim, 2.pl.: nëmet
- Present participle: nëmende
- Infinitive: nëmen
- Verbal noun: genitive: nëmen(n)es, dative: ze nëmen(n)e

The bold vowels demonstrate umlaut; the vowels in brackets were dropped in rapid speech.

The preterite conjugation went as follows:

	genomen haben to have taken	
	Indicative	Subjunctive
1. sg.	ich nam	ich næme
2. sg.	du næme	du næmest
3. sg.	ër nam	er næme
1. pl.	wir nâmen	wir næmen
2. pl.	ir nâmet	ir næmet
3. pl.	sie nâmen	sie næmen

- Past participle: genomen

==== Weak verbs ====
The present tense conjugation went as follows:

	suochen to seek	
	Indicative	Subjunctive
1. sg.	ich suoche	ich suoche
2. sg.	du suoch(e)st	du suochest
3. sg.	ër suoch(e)t	er suoche
1. pl.	wir suochen	wir suochen
2. pl.	ir suoch(e)t	ir suochet
3. pl.	sie suochent	sie suochen

- Imperative: 2.sg: suoche, 2.pl: suochet
- Present participle: suochende
- Infinitive: suochen
- Verbal noun: genitive: suochennes, dative: ze suochenne

The vowels in brackets were dropped in rapid speech.

The preterite conjugation went as follows:

	gesuocht haben to have sought	
	Indicative	Subjunctive
1. sg.	ich suochete	ich suochete
2. sg.	du suochetest	du suochetest
3. sg.	ër suochete	er suochete
1. pl.	wir suocheten	wir suocheten
2. pl.	ir suochetet	ir suochetet
3. pl.	sie suochetent	sie suocheten

- Past participle: gesuochet

== Vocabulary ==
In the Middle High German period, the rise of a courtly culture and the changing nature of knighthood was reflected in changes to the vocabulary. Since the impetus for this set of social changes came largely from France, many of the new words were either loans from French or influenced by French terms.

The French loans mainly cover the areas of chivalry, warfare and equipment, entertainment, and luxury goods:

- MHG âventiure < OF aventure (NHG Abenteuer, "adventure")
- MHG prîs < OF pris (NHG Preis, "prize, reward")
- MHG lanze < OF lance (NHG Lanze, "lance")
- MHG palas < OF palais (NHG Palast, "palace")
- MHG fest, veste < OF feste (NHG Fest, "festival, feast")
- MHG pinsel < OF pincel (NHG Pinsel, "paint brush")
- MHG samît < OF samit (NHG Samt, "velvet")
- MHG rosîn < OF raisin (NHG Rosine, "raisin")

Two highly productive suffixes were borrowed from French in this period:

- The noun suffix -îe is seen initially in borrowings from French such as massenîe ("retinue, household") and then starts to be combined with German nouns to produce, for example, jegerîe ("hunting") from jeger ("huntsman"), or arzatîe, arzenîe ("medicine ") from arzat ("doctor"). With the Early New High German diphthongization the suffix became /ai/ (spelling <ei>) giving NHG Jägerei, Arznei.
- The verb suffix -îeren resulted from adding the German infinitive suffix -en to the Old French infinitive endings -er/ir/ier. Initially, this was just a way of integrating French verbs into German syntax, but the suffix became productive in its own right and was added to non-French roots: MHG turnîeren is based on OF tourner ("to ride a horse"), but halbieren ("to cut in half") has no French source.

== Sample texts ==
=== Iwein ===
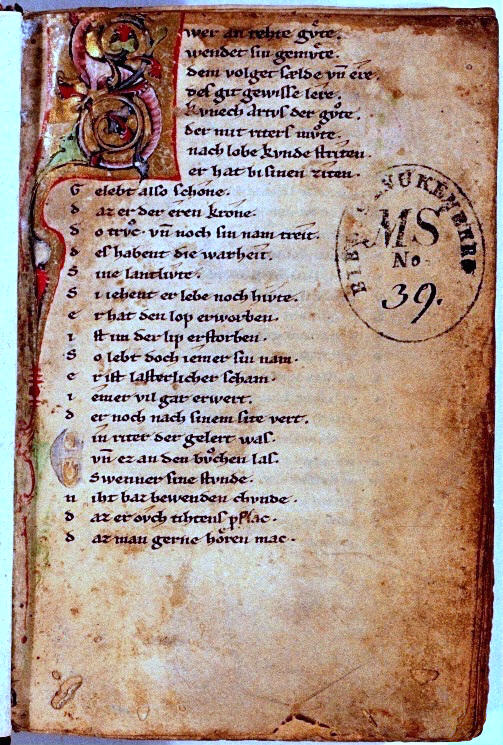
Manuscript B of Hartmann von Aue's Iwein (Gießen, UB, Hs. 97), folio 1r

The text is the opening of Hartmann von Aue's Iwein (c. 1200)

Middle High German

Swer an rehte güete
wendet sîn gemüete,
dem volget sælde und êre.
des gît gewisse lêre
künec Artûs der guote,
der mit rîters muote
nâch lobe kunde strîten.
er hât bî sînen zîten
gelebet alsô schône
daz er der êren krône
dô truoc und noch sîn name treit.
des habent die wârheit
sîne lantliute:
sî jehent er lebe noch hiute:
er hât den lop erworben,
ist im der lîp erstorben,
sô lebet doch iemer sîn name.
er ist lasterlîcher schame
iemer vil gar erwert,
der noch nâch sînem site vert.

[1]

[5]

[10]

[15]

[20]

English translation

Whoever to true goodness
Turns his mind
He will meet with fortune and honour.
We are taught this by the example of
Good King Arthur
who with knightly spirit
knew how to strive for praise.
In his day
He lived so well
That he wore the crown of honour
And his name still does so.
The truth of this is known
To his countrymen:
They affirm that he still lives today:
He won such fame that
Although his body died
His name lives on.
Of sinful shame
He will forever be free
Who follows his example.

Commentary: This text shows many typical features of Middle High German poetic language. Most Middle High German words survive into modern German in some form or other: this passage contains only one word (jehen 'say' 14) which has since disappeared from the language. But many words have changed their meaning substantially. Muot (6) means 'state of mind' (cognates with mood), where modern German Mut means courage. Êre (3) can be translated with 'honour', but is quite a different concept of honour from modern German Ehre; the medieval term focuses on reputation and the respect accorded to status in society.

=== Nibelungenlied ===
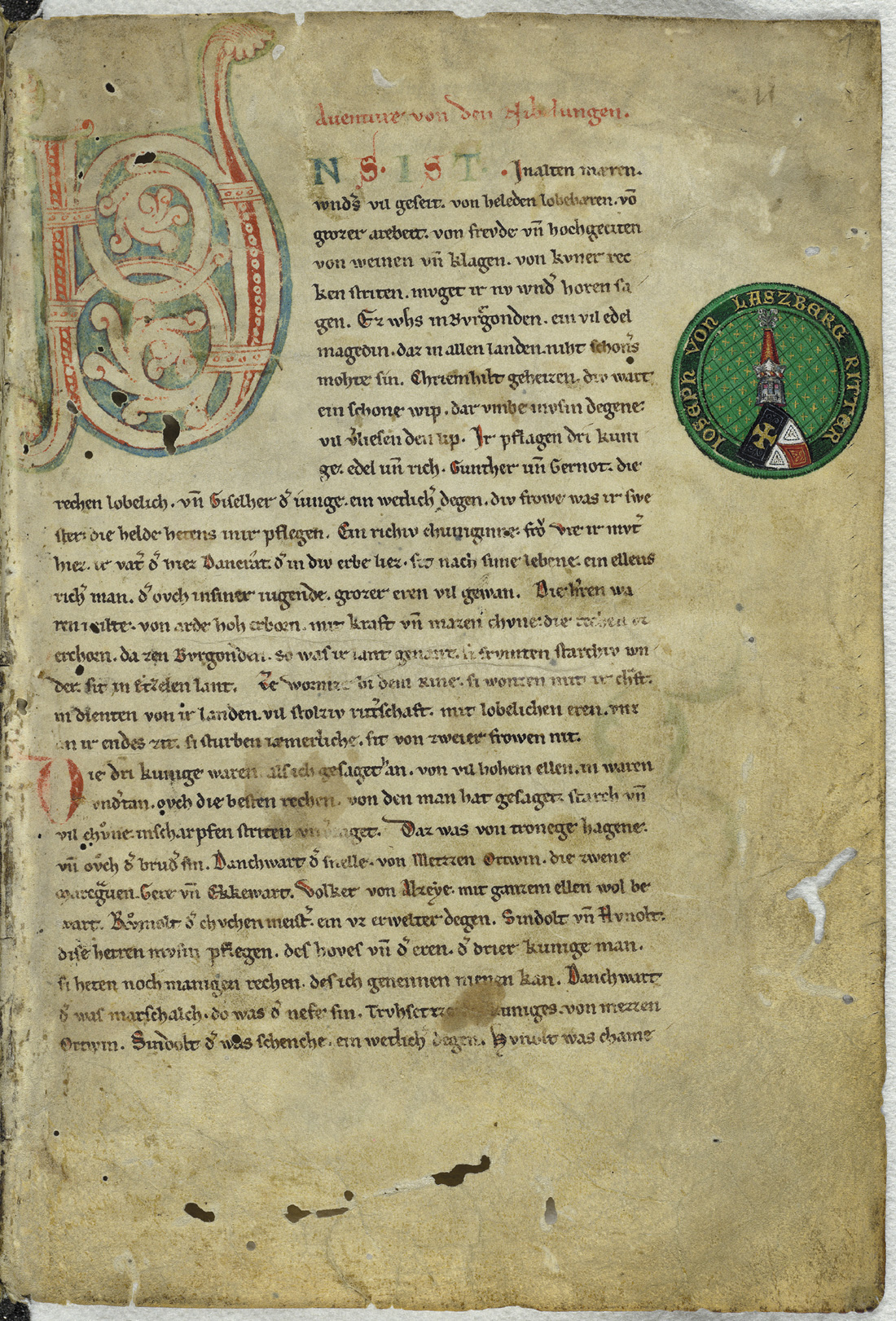
Manuscript C of the Nibelungenlied, fol. 1r

The text is the opening strophe of the Nibelungenlied (c. 1204).

Middle High German

Uns ist in alten mæren wunders vil geseit
von helden lobebæren, von grôzer arebeit,
von freuden, hôchgezîten, von weinen und von klagen,
von küener recken strîten muget ir nu wunder hœren sagen.

Modern German translation

In alten Erzählungen wird uns viel Wunderbares berichtet
von ruhmreichen Helden, von hartem Streit,
von glücklichen Tagen und Festen, von Schmerz und Klage:
vom Kampf tapferer Recken: Davon könnt auch Ihr nun Wunderbares berichten hören.

English translation

In ancient tales many marvels are told us
of renowned heroes, of great hardship
of joys, festivities, of weeping and lamenting
of bold warriors' battles — now you may hear such marvels told!

Commentary: All the MHG words are recognizable from Modern German, though mære ("tale") and recke ("warrior") are archaic and lobebære ("praiseworthy") has given way to lobenswert. Words which have changed in meaning include arebeit, which means "strife" or "hardship" in MHG, but now means "work", and hôchgezît ("festivity") which now, as Hochzeit, has the narrower meaning of "wedding".

=== Erec ===
The text is from the opening of Hartmann von Aue's Erec (c. 1180–1190). The manuscript (the Ambraser Heldenbuch) dates from 1516, over three centuries after the composition of the poem.

5

10

15

20

Original manuscript

nu riten ſÿ vnlange friſt
nebeneinander baide
Ee daz ſy über die haÿde
verre jn allen gahen
zureÿten ſahen
ein Ritter ſelb dritten
Vor ein Gezwerg da einmitten
ein Jŭnckfrawen gemaÿt
ſchon vnd wolgeklait
vnd wundert die kunigin
wer der Ritter mo^{a}chte ſein
Er was ze harnaſch wol
als ein gůt knecht ſol
Eregk der iunge man
ſein frawen fragen began
ob ers erfarn ſolte

Edited text

nû riten si unlange vrist
neben einander beide,
ê daz si über die heide
verre in allen gâhen
zuo rîten sâhen
einen ritter selbedritten,
vor ein getwerc, dâ enmitten
eine juncvorouwen gemeit,
schœne unde wol gekleit.
nû wunderte die künegîn
wer der ritter möhte sîn.
er was ze harnasche wol,
als ein guot kneht sol.
Êrec der junge man
sîn vrouwen vrâgen began
ob erz ervarn solde.

English translation

Now they had not been riding together
with one another very long
when they saw, riding across the heath
from afar, in all haste,
towards them,
a knight and two others with him —
in front of him a dwarf, and between the two there
a comely damsel,
fair and well clad,
and the Queen wondered
who this knight might be.
He was well armed,
as a good knight ought to be.
Young Erec
asked his lady
if he should find out the knight's identity.

== Literature ==
The following are some of the main authors and works of MHG literature:

- Lyric poetry
  - Minnesang
    - Codex Manesse
    - Reinmar von Hagenau
    - Walther von der Vogelweide
    - Heinrich Frauenlob
  - Oswald von Wolkenstein
- Epic
  - Nibelungenlied
  - Kudrun
- Chivalric romance
  - Hartmann von Aue's Erec and Iwein
  - Wolfram von Eschenbach's Parzival
  - Gottfried von Strassburg's Tristan
  - Ulrich von Türheim's Rennewart and Willehalm
  - Rudolf von Ems's works
  - Konrad von Würzburg's works
  - Eilhart von Oberge's Tristrant
- Spielmannsdichtung
  - King Rother
  - Herzog Ernst
- Chronicles
  - Annolied
  - Jans der Enikel's Weltchronik and Fürstenbuch
  - Kaiserchronik
- Law
  - Sachsenspiegel

== See also ==
- High German consonant shift
- Matthias Lexer
- Yiddish

== Bibliography ==
- Bartsch, Karl; De Boor, Helmut, eds. (1988). Das Nibelungenlied (22 ed.). Mannheim: F. A. Brockhaus. ISBN 3-7653-0373-9.
- Brackert, Helmut, ed. (1970). Das Nibelungenlied. Mittelhochdeutscher Text und Übertragung. Frankfurt-am-Main: Fischer. ISBN 3436013137.
- Brockhaus, Wiebke (1995). Final Devoicing in the Phonology of German. Tübingen: De Gruyter. ISBN 9783484303362.
- Edrich, Brigitte, ed. (2014). "Hartmann von Aue: Erec, Handschrift A." (PDF). Hartmann von Aue Portal.
- Edwards, Cyril, ed. (2014). Hartmann von Aue. Erec. Arthurian Archives. German Romance. Vol. V. Cambridge: D.S.Brewer. ISBN 978-1-84384-378-8.
- Edwards, Cyril, ed. (2007). Hartmann von Aue. Iwein or the Knight with the Lion. Arthurian Romances. Vol. III. Cambridge: D. S. Brewer. ISBN 978-0-19-923854-5.
- Edwards, Cyril, ed. (2010). The Nibelungenlied. Oxford World's Classics. Oxford: Oxford University Press. ISBN 978-1-84384-084-8.
- Keller, R. E. (1978). The German Language. London: Faber and Faber. ISBN 0-571-11159-9.
- Leitzmann, Albert, ed. (1985). Erec. Altdeutsche Textbibliothek. Vol. 19 (6th ed.). Tübingen: Niemeyer. ISBN 3-484-20139-8.
- Lexer, Matthias (1999). Mittelhochdeutsches Taschenwörterbuch (38th ed.). Stuttgart: S. Hirzel Verlag. ISBN 978-3777604930.
- Lindgren KB (1980). "Mittelhochdeutsch". In Althaus HP, Henne H, Wiegand HE (eds.). Lexikon der Germanistischen Linguistik. Vol. III (2nd ed.). Tübingen: Niemeyer. pp. 580–584. ISBN 3-484-10391-4.
- Paul, Hermann (2007). Thomas Klein; Hans-Joachim Solms; Klaus-Peter Wegera (eds.). Mittelhochdeutsche Grammatik (25th ed.). Tübingen: Niemeyer. ISBN 978-3484640344.
- Rautenberg U (1985). "Soziokulturelle Voraussetzung und Sprachraum des Mittelhochdeutschen". In Besch W, Reichmann O, Sonderegger S (eds.). Sprachgeschichte. Vol. 2. Berlin, New York: Walter De Gruyter. pp. 1120–29. ISBN 3-11-009590-4.
- Roelcke T (1998). "Die Periodisierung der deutschen Sprachgeschichte". In Besch W, Betten A, Reichmann O, Sonderegger S (eds.). Sprachgeschichte. Vol. 2 (2nd ed.). Berlin, New York: Walter De Gruyter. pp. 798–815. ISBN 3-11-011257-4.
- Schmidt, Wilhelm (2013). Geschichte der deutschen Sprache: Ein Lehrbuch für das Germanistische Studium. Stuttgart: Hirzel. ISBN 9783777622729.
- Tschirch, Fritz (1975). Geschichte der Deutschen Sprache (2nd ed.). Berlin: Erich Schmidt. ISBN 3503007857.
- Waterman, John T. (1976). A History of the German Language (Revised ed.). University of Washington Press. ISBN 0-295-73807-3.
- Wiessner, Edmund (1959). "Höfisches Rittertum 1200–1300". In Maurer, Friedrich; Rupp, Heinz (eds.). Deutsche Wortgeschichte. Vol. 1 (3rd ed.). Berlin, New York: De Gruyter. pp. 187–243. doi:10.1515/9783110841916.189. ISBN 3-11-003627-4.
