= Women in German Studies =

Academic organisation

Women+ in German Studies (W+IGS) is an organisation, which was founded in 1988 in order to connect female Germanists in Great Britain and Ireland and support them in all aspects of their professional life.

== Conferences ==
- 1988 University of Reading (organiser: Helen Watanabe)
- 1989 University of Salford (organiser Juliet Wigmore)
- 1990 University of Swansea (organisers: Brigid Haines and Allyson Fiddler)
- 1991 Queen Mary and Westfield College, London (organiser: Pat Howe)
- 1992 Manchester Metropolitan University (organiser: Sally Johnson)
- 1993 Nottingham: ‘Women and the “Wende”’ (organiser: Elizabeth Boa)
- 1994 University of Warwick (organiser: Georgina Paul)
- 1995 University of Central Lancashire (organisers: Helen Jones & Petra Bagley)
- 1996 University of Exeter (organiser: Chloe Paver)
- 1997 University of East Anglia, Norwich: ‘Theory’ (organisers: Jo Catling & Margot Paterson)
- 1998 Open conference, University of Manchester: "Women’s Autobiography in German: Theory and Practice”, Special guests Anne Duden & Ruth Klüger (organiser: Margaret Littler)
- 1999 University of the West of England, Bristol ‘Women and Society’ (organiser: Gisela Shaw)
- 2000 Universities of Edinburgh and Glasgow ‘Myths and Mythmaking’ (organiser: Sarah Colvin)
- 2001 University of Leeds (organiser: Ingrid Sharp)
- 2002 University of Southampton (organiser: Andrea Reiter)
- 2003 Open conference, University of Bath ‘Local Narratives, Global Narratives’ (organisers: Renate Rechtien & Caroline von Oppen)
- 2004 Selwyn College, Cambridge (organiser: Charlotte Woodford)
- 2006 Newcastle University (organisers: Teresa Ludden & Beate Müller)
- 2007 University of Sussex (Brighton) (organiser: Andrea Hammel)
- 2008 Open conference, University of Liverpool: “Impact: German-language culture and its reception” (organisers: Rebecca Braun and Lyn Marven)
- 2009 University of Birmingham (organiser: Joanne Sayner)
- 2010 Joint WIGS/WISPS conference, University of Swansea: “Friendship and cross-cultural cooperation" (organisers: Brigid Haines and Sarah Bowskill)
- 2011 University of Leeds (organisers: Helen Finch and Ingrid Sharp)
- 2012 Open conference, UCD Dublin: “About Time: Conceptualising and representing temporality in German, Swiss and Austrian Culture”, special guest: Angelika Overath (organiser: Gillian Pye)
- 2013 University of Sheffield, WIGS 25th Anniversary Conference (organiser: Caroline Bland)
- 2014 Selwyn College, Cambridge (organiser: Charlotte Woodford)
- 2015 University of Durham (organisers: Marie Isabel Matthews-Schlinzig & Tracey Reimann-Dawe)
- 2016 University of Aberystwyth (organiser: Rose Simpson)
- 2017 Open conference, University of Oxford: "Reform & Revolt" (organiser: Henrike Lähnemann)
- 2018 Aston University, WIGS 30th Anniversary Conference (organiser: Claudia Gremler)
- 2019 University College Dublin (organisers: Siobhán Donovan and Gillian Pye)
- 2020 University of Warwick (organisers: Katie Stone and Elisabeth Hermann)
- 2021 Open conference, University of Aberdeen: "Crossing Thresholds" (organisers: Katya Krylova, Gundula Sharman, Tara Beaney)
- 2022 University of Leeds (organisers: Corinne Painter and Ingrid Sharp)
- 2023 University of Exeter (organisers: Ulrike Zitzlsperger, Chloe Paver, and Ina Linge)
- 2024 University College Cork (organiser: Rachel MagShamhráin)
- 2025 Aberystwyth University (organiser: Andrea Hammel)

== List of Committee Members ==
- Founding president: Helen Watanabe (Chair 1988 - 1991)

Gabi Rahaman (Treasurer 1988 - 1990) Pat Howe (Freelance register 1988-1989) Margaret Littler (Part-time/freelance rep followed by freelance register 1988 - 1991 and Secretary 1994-1997) Anne Simon (PG rep 1988-1989) Margaret Vallance (polys/colleges/New Universities rep 1988-1995) Juliet Wigmore (Secretary 1989-1991) Susan Beardmore (Part-time/freelance rep 1990-1994) Jean Conacher (PG rep: 1990-1) Brigid Haines (Treasurer 1991-1994) Linda Holt (PG rep 1991-?)

- Elizabeth Boa (Chair 1992-1995)

Sue Lawson (Freelance register 1992-1995) Georgina Paul (Secretary 1991-1994)

- Gisela Shaw (Chair 1995-2001)

Chloë Paver (Treasurer 1995-1997) Brigitte Lechner (Part-time/freelance rep 1995-1997 Laura Ovenden (PG rep 1995? - 1997) Clare Lambert (Freelance register 1996-1997) Mererid Puw Davies (Secretary 1998-2000) Beth Linklater (Treasurer 1998-2000) Ursula Wiedenmann (Part-time/freelance rep 1998-2001) Teresa Ludden (PG rep: 1998-2000 and part-time/freelance rep 2003) Margaret Vince (Freelance register 1998-2003) Betsy Pennebaker (IT rep: 1999-2000) Andrea Reiter (IT rep 1999-2003) Birgit Röder (Treasurer 2001-2003) Charlotte Woodford (Secretary 2001-2006) Joanne Sayner (PG rep 2001-2003) Anna Saunders (IT rep 2001-2007)

- Lesley Sharpe (Chair 2002-2005)

Andrea Hammel (Treasurer 2004-2008) Rebecca Braun (Beard) (PG rep 2004-2006) Marielle Sutherland (Part-time/freelance rep 2004-2007) Margot Paterson (Freelance register 2004-2006)

- Sarah Colvin (Chair 2005-2008)

Michaela Gigerl (PG rep 2006-2007) Katherine Griffiths (PG rep 2006) Christiane Schönfeld (Ireland rep 2006-2009) Lyn Marven (Secretary 2007-2011) Deborah Holmes (IT rep 2006-2007) Áine McMurtry (IT rep 2008-2012) Sarah Jones (PG rep 2008-2009) Corinne Atwood

- Henrike Lähnemann (Chair 2009-2015)

Karina von Lindeiner-Stráský (Treasurer 2009-2013) Alex Lloyd (Vinall) (PG rep 2009-2011) Charlotte Ryland (Part-time/freelance rep 2010-2013) Gillian Pye (Ireland rep 2010-2017) Helen Finch (Secretary 2011-2015) Emily Spiers (PG rep 2012-2014) Caroline Bland (Treasurer 2013-2017) Madeleine Brook (IT rep 2013-2016) Simone Schroth (Part-time/freelance rep 2013-2019) Cyd Sturgess (PG rep 2014-2017) Birgit Mikus (Early Career rep 2014-2017) Katya Krylova (Secretary 2015-2019)

- Brigid Haines (Chair 2015-2019)

Sarah Pogoda (Treasurer 2017-2021) Siobhán Donovan (Ireland rep 2017-2022) Cyd Sturgess (Early Career rep 2017-2021) Mary Frank (PG rep 2017-2019)

- Ingrid Sharp (Chair 2019-2024)

Mary Frank (Part-time/freelance rep 2019-2021) Catherine Smale (Secretary 2019-) Chantal Sullivan-Thomsett (PG rep 2019-2021) Ina Linge (Treasurer 2021 -) Iman Nick (Equality, Diversion & Inclusion rep 2021-) Corinne Painter (Early career rep 2021-) Hilary Potter (Early career rep 2021-) Molly Harrabin (PG rep 2021-)

- Christiane Schönfeld (Chair 2025-)

Joanna Raisbeck (Secretary), Katherine Calvert and Sabrina Link (Treasurers), Louise Earnshaw and Lara Marie Haegerling (PGR reps), Emily Stokes (EDI rep), Liza Weber (ECA rep), Áine McGillicuddy (Irish rep)

== W+IGS Postgraduate Essay Prize ==
The Women in German Studies Postgraduate Essay Prize was established in 2014. Postgraduate members of WIGS are encouraged to submit essays on any topic within German Studies. The winning essay is selected by the WIGS committee and announced at the annual WIGS conference. Winners of the essay prize receive £100 and the opportunity to have their piece published in the journal German Life and Letters.

- 2014 Winner: Ina Linge. Runners-up: Sophie Burt, Jenny Watson and Erica Wickerson
- 2015 Winner: Ellen Pilsworth. Runners-up: Marlene Schrijnders and Nicola Thomas
- 2016 Winner: Melissa Schuh. Runners-up: Mary Frank, Tabea Horst, Judith Lebiez
- 2017 - competition not held on account of Open Conference
- 2018 Winner: Judith Lebiez. Runners-up: Niahm Burns and Jennifer Caisley
- 2020 Winner: Katherine Calvert. Runner-up: Catriona Corke
- 2021 Winner: Lauren Cuthbert. Runner-up: Shivani Chauhan
- 2022 Winner: Annegret Märten. Runner-up: Vivian Jochen
- 2023 Winner: Lorna McCarron
- 2024 Winner: Isabel Parkinson. Runners-up: Camilla Balbi and Hannah Scheithauer
- 2025 not awarded

== W+IGS Book Prize ==
The Women in German Studies Book Prize was established in 2015 and is sponsored by "Peter Lang" Oxford. Members of WIGS who are preparing their first book for publication are encouraged to submit proposals. All topics within German Studies are welcome. The winning book proposal is selected by the WIGS committee and the commissioning editor for German Studies at "Peter Lang" Oxford presents the prize at the annual WIGS conference. The winner of the prize in each year receives £150.

- 2015 Winner: Sally-Ann Spencer. Runner-up: Marissa Munderloh
- 2016 Winner: Ina Linge. Runner-up: Marie Kolkenbrock
- 2017 - competition not held on account of Open Conference
- 2018 Winner: Iga Nowicz. Runner-up: Cornelia Wech
- 2019 Winner: Yejun Zou. Runners-up: Mirta Devidi and Hanna Rompf
- 2020 Winner: Doriane Zerka. Runner-up: Izabela Rakar
- 2021 Winner: Leila Essa. Runner-up: Jenny Price
- 2022 Winner: Sarah Jacobson. Runner-up: Natascha Domeisen
- 2023 Winner: Liza Weber
- 2024 Winner: Carolin Gluchowski. Runner-up: Annegret Märten
- 2025 Winners: Isabel Parkinson & Miriam Schwarz
