= Michael J. O'Kelly =

Irish archaeologist

Michael J. O'Kelly FSA MRIA
- Born: Michael Joseph O'Kelly; 5 November 1915; Abbeyfeale, County Limerick, Ireland
- Died: 14 October 1982 (aged 66); Cork, Ireland
- Occupation: Archaeologist
- Spouse: Claire O'Donovan (m. 1945)
- Children: 3
- Writing career
- Notable works: Led excavation and restoration of Newgrange

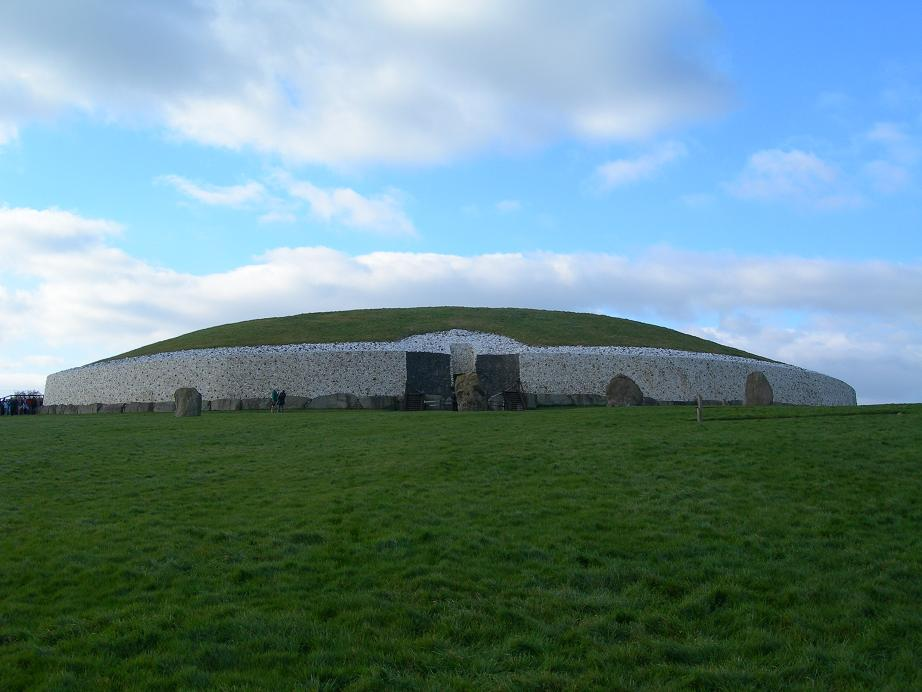
The reconstructed Newgrange

Michael Joseph "Brian" O'Kelly FSA MRIA (5 November 1915 – 14 October 1982) was an Irish archaeologist who led the excavation and restoration of Newgrange, a major Neolithic passage tomb in the Boyne Valley, County Meath, Ireland, now a UNESCO World Heritage Site.

== Early life ==
O'Kelly was born in Abbeyfeale, County Limerick in 1915, the son of Elizabeth (née McAuliffe) and Joseph O'Kelly, a national school teacher. Although he was baptized Michael Joseph, and published as Michael J. or M.J., he was known to family and friends as Brian, the name his mother originally wanted, throughout his life. He was educated at Rockwell College in County Tipperary, before entering University College Cork in 1934. He initially studied engineering, before switching to architecture after his first year, studying surveying and architectural drawing under Henry Houghton Hill.

In the spring of 1937, while an undergraduate, he worked as a surveyor in the excavation of the ring-fort at Garranes, County Cork with Seán P. Ó Ríordáin, then Professor of Archaeology at Cork. He was inspired to take a new career path, and in the autumn of that year, he switched courses at university again, this time to archaeology, becoming one of Ó Ríordáin's students. That term he moved on to the Neolithic site of Lough Gur.

He graduated with a first-class B.A. with honours in 1940, and the following year, he was awarded a first-class M.A. in archaeology for a survey of the antiquities of the barony of Smallcounty, County Limerick, for which he also won the National University of Ireland's coveted travelling studentship in archaeology. After receiving his M.A. he was appointed curator of the new Cork Public Museum in Fitzgerald Park. In 1945 he married Claire O'Donovan, also an archaeologist, whom he had met as a student. The couple had three daughters, including the Germanist scholar Helen Watanabe-O'Kelly, and lived in Blackrock, Cork.

== Career ==
In 1946 O'Kelly succeeded Professor Ó Ríordáin as head of the Archaeology Department at Cork, a position he held for 36 years. He led field work each summer, and from 1944 was published extensively in scholarly journals. In 1947, he was elected a Fellow of the Society of Antiquaries of London, and the following year, he was elected a Member of the Royal Irish Academy. He was also a vice-president of the Royal Society of Antiquaries of Ireland and the Prehistoric Society.

=== Newgrange ===
Newgrange, the site O'Kelly is most associated with, was originally accidentally discovered in 1699. It was in extremely poor condition in 1961, with no public access. That year the archaeologist Patrick Hartnett selected O'Kelly to direct excavations. Work continued every season through to 1975.

On 21 December 1967 O'Kelly confirmed a local legend that the rays of the sun on the midwinter sunrise go straight through the tomb – passing through a small 'roof-box' opening above the doorway to penetrate along the whole length of the passage as far as the center of the chamber. O'Kelly speculated: "I think that the people who built Newgrange built not just a tomb but a house of the dead, a house in which the spirits of special people were going to live for a very long time. To ensure this, the builders took special precautions to make sure the tomb stayed completely dry, as it is to this day. …" O'Kelly and his wife also led work on other sites within the Boyne Valley complex.

== Death ==
O'Kelly died suddenly at the Bon Secours Hospital, Cork on 14 October 1982, aged 66. He was buried in St. Michael's Cemetery, Cork.

== Selected bibliography ==
- Irish Antiquity (1981)
- Newgrange: Archaeology, Art and Legend (1982)
- Early Ireland: An Introduction to Irish Prehistory (1989, posthumous)
