= König Rother =

Middle High German epic poem

A page from a later 13th-century copy, now in Munich

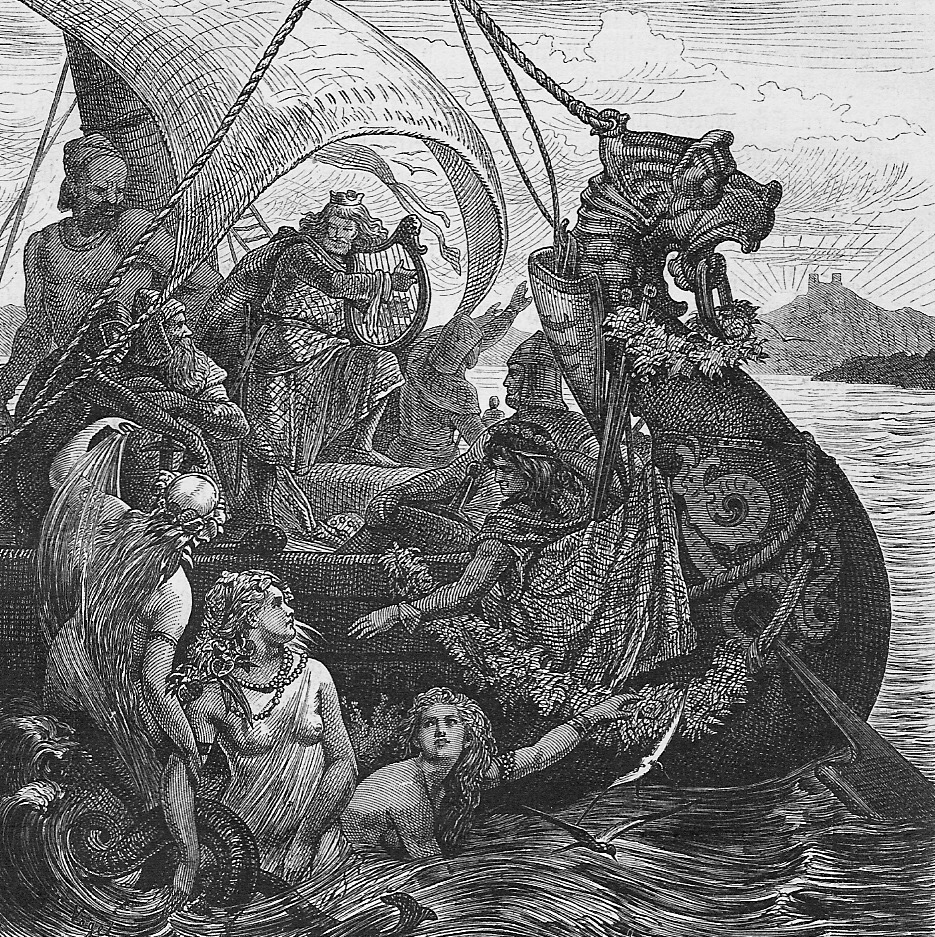
Rother taking his bride back by sea, an illustration from Otto Leixner von Grünberg's Illustrierte Literaturgeschichte (1880)

König Rother ('King Rother') is the earliest Middle High German epic poem. It consists of 5,204 lines of rhymed couplets. The author is unknown, but was probably a clergyman writing in Bavaria. It was written no earlier than 1152, probably before 1180. The earliest manuscript, Heidelberg Cpg 390, is from around 1200 and is also the only complete copy. Three fragmentary manuscripts from the 13th and 14th centuries are known.

The theme of König Rother is the "dangerous bridal quest". Traditionally classified as a Spielmannsdichtung, today it is more often labelled "pre-courtly epic". The story is probably based on orally transmitted accounts of historical events, but its treatment is entirely fictional. King Rother, for example, may be a reflection of King Rothari or King Roger II of Sicily, both of whom ruled in Italy. In the story, Rother, whose capital is Bari, needs a wife to ensure his succession. He pursues the daughter of Emperor Konstantin of Constantinople, who has the habit of executing her suitors. Rother outsmarts the emperor and takes the girl back to his kingdom, but her father's sends a ship to take her back. In a second effort, Rother goes in disguise to Constantinople, but is identified and sentenced to death. He is saved by a pre-planned military intervention and finally receives his bride.

== Bibliography ==
- Bornholdt, Claudia (2010). "König Rother". In Bjork, Robert E. (ed.). The Oxford Dictionary of the Middle Ages. Oxford: Oxford University Press.
- Garland, Henry; Garland, Mary, eds. (2005). "König Rother". The Oxford Companion to German Literature (3rd ed.). Oxford University Press.
- Gibbs, Marion E.; Johnson, Sidney M. (2002) [1997]. Medieval German Literature. Routledge.
- Johnson, Sidney M. (2002). "Pre-Courtly Epics". In Francis G. Gentry (ed.). A Companion to Middle High German Literature to the 14th Century. Brill. pp. 397–429.
- Palmer, Nigel F. (1997). "The High and Later Middle Ages (1100–1450)". In Helen Watanabe-O'Kelly (ed.). The Cambridge History of German Literature. Cambridge University Press. pp. 40–91. doi:10.1017/CHOL9780521434171.003.
