= Herzog Ernst =

German epic from the early high Middle Ages

Herzog Ernst is a German epic from the early high Middle Ages (c. 1180), first written down by an anonymous author from the Rhine region.

== Story ==
The main theme of the story is an argument between a Bavarian duke (Herzog Ernst) and his stepfather Otto the Great. The story is split into two parts:

- Ernst becomes a Herzog and, as a result of the malicious scheming of the Kaiser's uncle, Pfalzgraf Heinrich, is outlawed.
- Herzog Ernst travels through the Orient in search of the Holy Grave. He encounters wonderful things, for example, creatures with human bodies and bird (specifically crane) heads. Eventually, he decides to return home and tricks the Kaiser into forgiving him.

== Historical context ==
The epic blends together two historical events: an argument between Herzog Liudolf and his father Otto I in 953–954; and the rebellion of Herzog Ernst II from Swabia (born 1007) against his stepfather King Konrad II in 1026–1027

This story was very popular in the Middle Ages in Germany, as evidenced by the number of manuscripts that have been found in a wide range of places. It was popular due to its fantastical descriptions of the Orient and far away lands (a popular topic due to the Second Crusade), and also its introduction of the concept of chivalry.

Herzog Ernst is usually grouped under the heading 'Spielmannsdichtung' or 'Spielmannsepos'. This term is used to describe a handful of other manuscripts of the time, due to the assumption that they were written and told by Spielmänner (a kind of jester). However, this term has recently been disputed, as these works are considered too complex to have been written by Spielmänner, who are generally thought to have been uneducated.

== Versions ==
The earliest extant version of Herzog Ernst, known as Herzog Ernst A, is a fragmented vernacular version written in the mid-twelfth century. The text of this version was transmitted in both Latin and German throughout the Middle Ages. Version B is a vernacular text written in rhyming couplets and was likely written and read in a courtly context. Version C focuses more strongly on the religious themes and morals; it was almost certainly written in a monastery. This version also expands the role of Adelheid, Ernst's mother, who was identified as Adelaide of Italy. The author of version E, which was written in hexameters, is identified as Odo von Magdeburg.

== Other works ==
The following were also produced around this period:

- König Rother (c 1160)
- Rolandslied (c 1135)
- Alexanderlied (c 1130)
- Reindhardt Fuchs (c 1170)
