= Spielmannsdichtung =

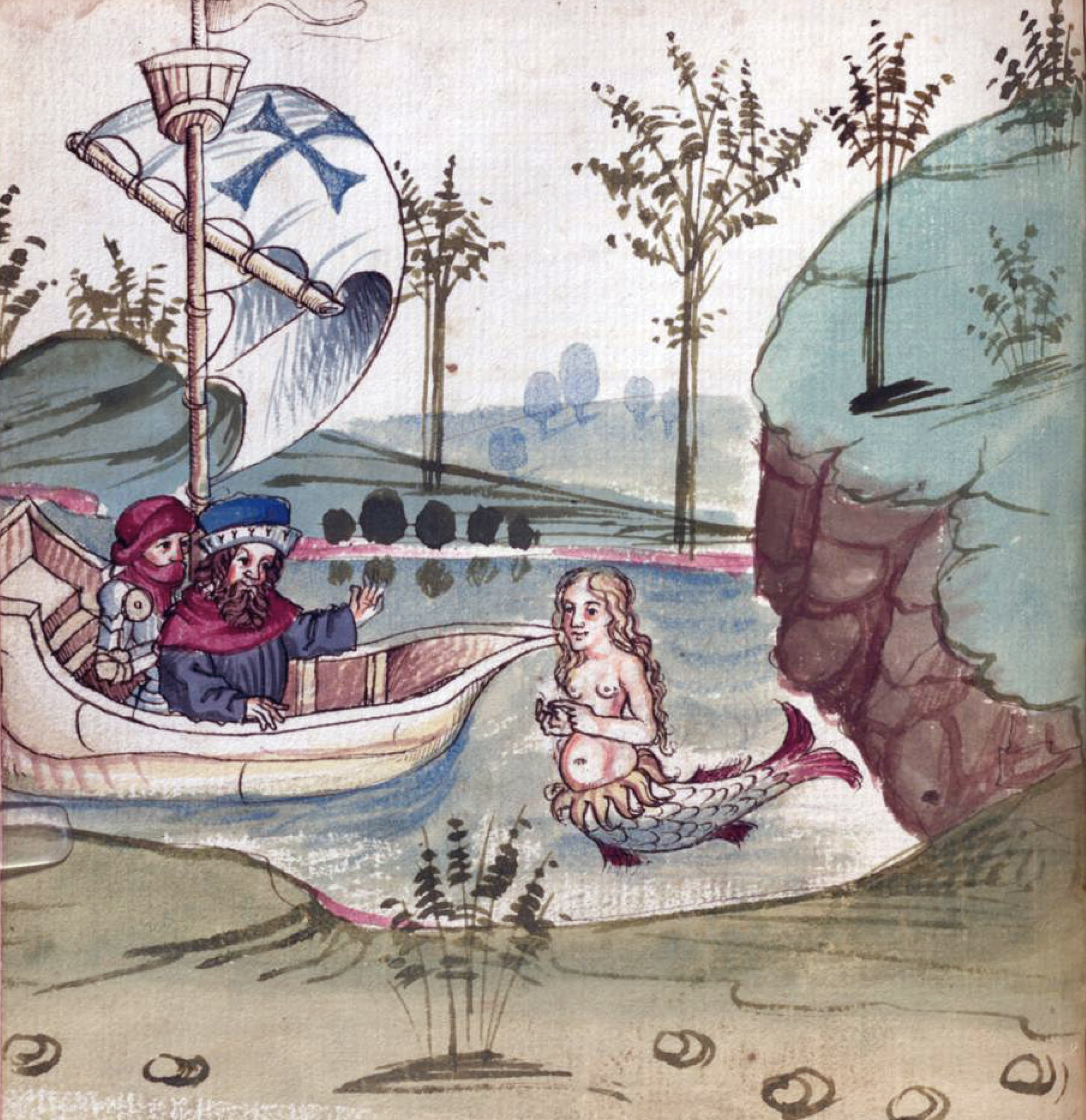
Image from a manuscript of Solomon and Marcolf by Hans Dirmstein, 1479

The Spielmannsdichtung or Spielmannsepik (or -epos) is a proposed genre, now generally deprecated, of Middle High German literature, specifically the lyric poetry (Dichtung) or epic (Epik or Epos) of wandering minstrels (Spielmannen) of the twelfth century. The term was used to classify several early Middle High German works that predated the Minnesang and the Höfische Epik. They are considered heroic and adventurous works destined for a popular audience and were long attributed to wandering minstrels, though this view has been abandoned, since the minstrels were not generally literate. The term remains today only as a convenience for grouping together similarly themed works:

- König Rother
- Herzog Ernst
- Solomon and Marcolf
- Orendel
- König Oswald

Most of these were only written down in the thirteenth century and survive in multiple variations. They blend history, legend, and fairy tale, but internal evidence points to a learned authorship, probably clerical. They are punctuated by instances of crude comedy and were probably intended for a less educated noble audience. They are generally dated based on references in the text which show that they are not earlier than the middle of the twelfth century. Commonalities between all five anonymous Spielmannsdichtungen are often hard to identify and for that the term has ceased to be used to describe a genre.
