= Seán P. Ó Ríordáin =

Irish archaeologist

Seán P. Ó Ríordáin MRIA
- Born: Seán Pádraig Ó Ríordáin; 17 December 1904; Monkstown, County Cork, Ireland, UK
- Died: 11 April 1957 (aged 52); Dublin, Ireland
- Resting place: Donaghcumper Church, Celbridge, County Kildare
- Education: University College Cork (BA, MA, PhD)
- Occupation: Archaeologist
- Employers: National Museum of Ireland – Archaeology; University College Cork; University College Dublin
- Spouse: Gabriel Hayes (m. 1936)
- Children: 2

Seán Pádraig Ó Ríordáin MRIA (17 December 1904 – 11 April 1957) was an Irish archaeologist who specialised primarily in the study of the prehistory and early medieval history of Ireland. He was one of the preeminent Irish archaeologists of the early 20th century, and was noted for his excavations at Lough Gur, County Limerick, and for his innovations in archaeological fieldwork. He served as Professor of Archaeology at University College Cork from 1936 until 1943, then as Professor of Celtic Archaeology at University College Dublin from 1943 until his death in 1957. As a professor, he influenced a generation of Irish archaeologists, notably Michael J. O'Kelly and Rúaidhrí de Valera.

== Biography ==
Ó Ríordáin was born into a working-class family in Monkstown, County Cork, the son of Annie (née Barry, died 1930) and James Ó Ríordáin (1865-1939). Initially apprenticed as a dockworker at the Port of Cork, he took examinations for the Department of Education and qualified as a national school teacher. He then began a night course at University College Cork (UCC), from which he graduated with a Bachelor of Arts degree in 1928.

Ó Ríordáin had a keen interest in the Irish language and culture, and it was as a student of Canon Patrick Power, Professor of Archaeology at UCC, that he was introduced to the subject. In 1930, he obtained a Master of Arts degree with first-class honours, and the following year, he was awarded a coveted National University of Ireland (NUI) travelling studentship, which enabled him to study archaeological field techniques and museum collections in Great Britain and Continental Europe. During this period, at the suggestion of R. A. Stewart Macalister, Professor of Celtic Archaeology at University College Dublin (UCD), and Adolf Mahr, the director of the National Museum of Ireland in Dublin, Ó Ríordáin began studying Bronze Age halberds. For his work in this area, he was awarded a doctorate by the NUI. Afterwards, he began working at the antiquities branch of the National Museum.

1936 was a fulfilling year for Ó Ríordáin. That year, he married the sculptor and painter Gabriel Hayes, with whom he would have one daughter and one son. He then succeeded Power as Professor of Archaeology at UCC, moving back to his native Monkstown with his new wife to take up the position. The same year, he was elected a Member of the Royal Irish Academy. While in Cork, he revitalised the long-established Cork Historical and Archaeological Society, as its honorary secretary and editor of its journal. Its membership almost doubled, and the enlarged and redesigned journal enjoyed a much wider readership outside Ireland. He was given an honorary life membership of the Society.

In 1943, following Macalister's death, Ó Ríordáin succeeded him as Professor of Celtic Archaeology at UCD. He introduced new areas of research to both university departments at which he taught, and introduced his students, including Michael J. O'Kelly at UCC and Rúaidhrí de Valera at UCD, to the modern techniques of field archaeology. In his obituary of Ó Ríordáin in the Journal of the Royal Society of Antiquaries of Ireland, O'Kelly credited him with transforming the archaeology department at UCD in particular.

Ó Ríordáin was noted for his fieldwork, especially for the eighteen years of excavations which he carried out at the multi-period site of Lough Gur, County Limerick, which elucidated much of its complex history, and formed the basis of studies of the site which continue to this day. He also analysed Ireland's Roman history, and contributed significantly to knowledge of Ireland's early medieval history. He and British archaeologist Glyn Daniel began excavations of the passage graves at Newgrange; Daniel published their study of these sites in 1964, after Ó Ríordáin's death. In 1955, Ó Ríordáin began excavating at Tara, County Meath, conducting the first modern investigation of this important site. He made several notable discoveries at Tara, including an undisturbed passage grave, which were reported on in newspapers, although his studies of the site were not published until many years later.

Ó Ríordáin delivered lectures frequently in public and on radio. He was one of the first Irish archaeologists to appear on British television, featuring the reconstruction of ancient dwellings at Lough Gur. In 1958, he appeared on an episode of the BBC panel show Animal, Vegetable, Mineral?, chaired by Daniel, identifying different objects and artefacts alongside fellow archaeologists V. Gordon Childe and Mortimer Wheeler, the latter being the programme's regular expert panellist. Ó Ríordáin wrote numerous papers and excavation reports which were published in archaeological journals, and his 1942 book Antiquities of the Irish countryside has been republished in five editions. He was president of the Royal Society of Antiquaries of Ireland from 1953 to 1956, and was awarded a D.Litt. by the NUI.

Ó Ríordáin fell ill in the autumn of 1956, and died in Dublin on 11 April 1957, at the age of 52. He is buried alongside his wife in the cemetery of Donaghcumper Church in Celbridge, County Kildare.
