= Gabriel Hayes =

Irish artist

- Hayes in 1942 working on a relief for the façade of the new Department of Industry and Commerce building Kildare Street, Dublin.
- Born: Mary Gabriel Hayes; 25 August 1909; Holles Street Hospital, Dublin, Ireland
- Died: 28 October 1978 (aged 69); Dublin
- Education: Dublin Metropolitan School of Art
- Notable work: sculpture
- Spouse: Seán P. Ó Ríordáin

Gabriel Hayes (25 August 1909 – 28 October 1978) was an Irish artist born in Dublin. She was a sculptor and medallist who studied in Dublin, France, and Italy and was also an accomplished painter.

== Early life and family ==
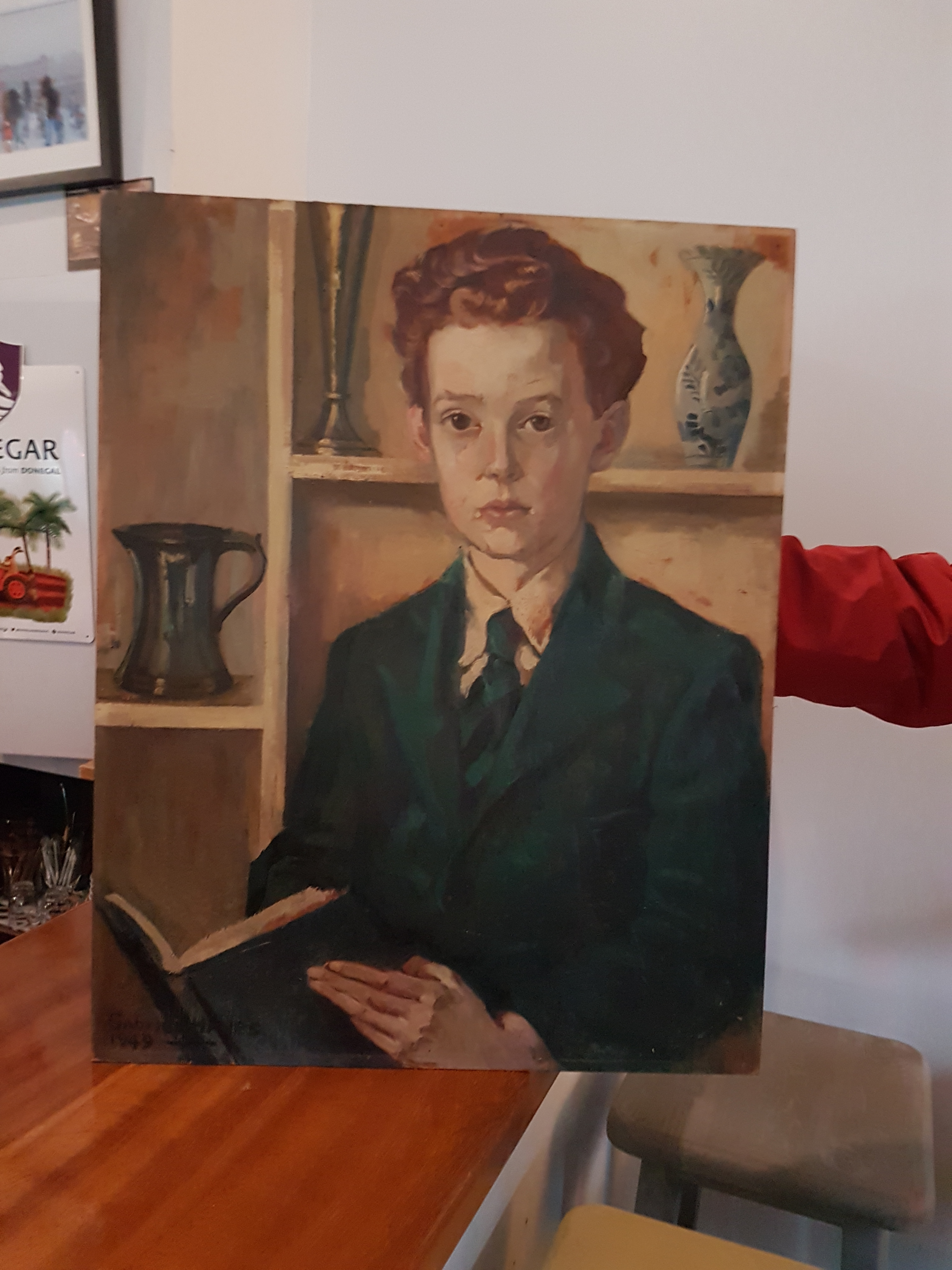
Portrait of a young Boy by Hayes

Mary Gabriel Hayes was born on 25 August 1909 at Holles Street Hospital, Dublin. Her parents were Jeremiah and Gertrude Hayes (née Lawlor). Her father was a member of the Royal Irish Constabulary, and worked in the prison service. Her mother left the family and emigrated to Australia in 1913, where she invented a false past and pursued a nursing career. In 1928 she was sacked as Matron of Canberra Hospital under controversial circumstances. She remarried and, in the 1950s, her mental health deteriorated and she believed that her husband was trying to poison her. She returned to Ireland in 1957 but it is not clear whether she reconciled with her daughter.

Hayes was primarily raised by her aunt. She attended in the Dominican College, Eccles Street, Dublin. She studied for a year at the Dublin Metropolitan School of Art (DMSA) in 1925 to 1926, before living in the United States for a short time. She then moved to France to study French in Montpellier for 3 years. While there, she took art classes and visited art galleries before moving to Paris. Returning to Dublin, she enrolled in the DMSA in 1930, spending her summer holidays in Italy or France. While at the DMSA, she focused on painting while studying under Seán Keating and Oliver Sheppard. In her second year at the DMSA, she won the teachers-in-training scholarship. She finished her studies at the DMSA in 1936.

In 1936, Hayes married Seán P. Ó Ríordáin, an archaeologist who was working at the National Museum of Ireland at the time. They moved to Monkstown, County Cork when he took up a post as chair of archaeology in University College Cork. They had one daughter and one son. After the death of her husband, Hayes moved to near Celbridge, County Kildare.

== Career ==
The penny coin designed by Gabriel Hayes

Whilst a student at the Dublin Metropolitan School of Art, Hayes provided at least two paintings for an exhibition at Egan's Gallery, St Stephen's Green, Dublin in October 1934. The Irish Independent newspaper reported: "In the still life section, 'The Goddess of the Moon', by Gabriel Hayes, is outstanding. The brushwork in the oil painting is exceptionally good". The report elsewhere states that "Amongst the heads, mention must be made of ... Gabriel Hayes's 'Emigrants'". Her large oil painting depicting St Brigid "attracted much attention" when it was exhibited at the Royal Hibernian Academy in Dublin in 1936 When Archdeacon John Begley completed his third and final volume on the history of the diocese of Limerick ("The Diocese of Limerick from 1691 to the Present Time", pub. Browne & Nolan 1938), he was presented with his "much admired" portrait which was painted in oil by Hayes. Hayes' portrait of Professor Aloys Fleischmann (1910-1992), the German-born Professor of Music at University College Cork, titled "At Rehearsal" or "Professor A. Fleischmann - A Rehearsal", "attracted considerable attention" when it was exhibited in 1938 in Dublin at the 109th Exhibition of the Royal Hibernian Academy. The artist described how she had sketched the details of the picture in her home in Cork, and then brought the unfinished canvas to Dublin for completion, depicting the background as that of the Exhibition Hall where the picture was subsequently exhibited. Most of her works are in private hands. Hayes illustrated two books of stories for younger readers: Tales of Tara by Ethel Boyce Parsons (Talbot Press Ltd., Dublin, 1934) and The Long-Tailed Hen and other stories by M.F. MacGeehin (Talbot Press Ltd., Dublin, 1935).

Hayes designed several artworks in public and religious buildings in Ireland. Her best known works were the halfpenny, penny, and two pence coins she designed for the Irish decimal currency introduced in 1971. She submitted ideas at her own initiative when no design competition was held. She is also responsible for the other aspects of the decimal currency such as lettering and decoration.

One year before she died, in June 1977, Hayes was one of just four prize winners from 260 entries in the Oireachtas Art Exhibition for her wooden sculpture titled Grainne Mhaol Looking Out to Sea. The sculpture, carved in walnut, depicted the head of Grace O'Malley (Grainne Mhaol) - the 16th century chief of the O'Malley clan often referred to as "The Pirate Queen".

In February 2005, when An Post issued a set of stamps celebrating female Irish artists, Hayes was commemorated on the 65c stamp with a picture of her work, The Three Graces (1941). Adams Auction House Dublin, Ireland are selling "Portrait of a young boy" by Gabriel Hayes in March 2020

One of her works "The Cork Bowler" was sold at Christies in London in May 2000 for £23,500 stg. "The Cork Bowler" was sold again by auction at Sotheby's in London on 18 November 2019 for £81,250 stg (exceeding the estimate of £30,000-50,000 stg).

Excerpts from a biography of Gabriel Hayes by Professor Paula Murphy, are online at Sculpture Dublin

== Works on display ==
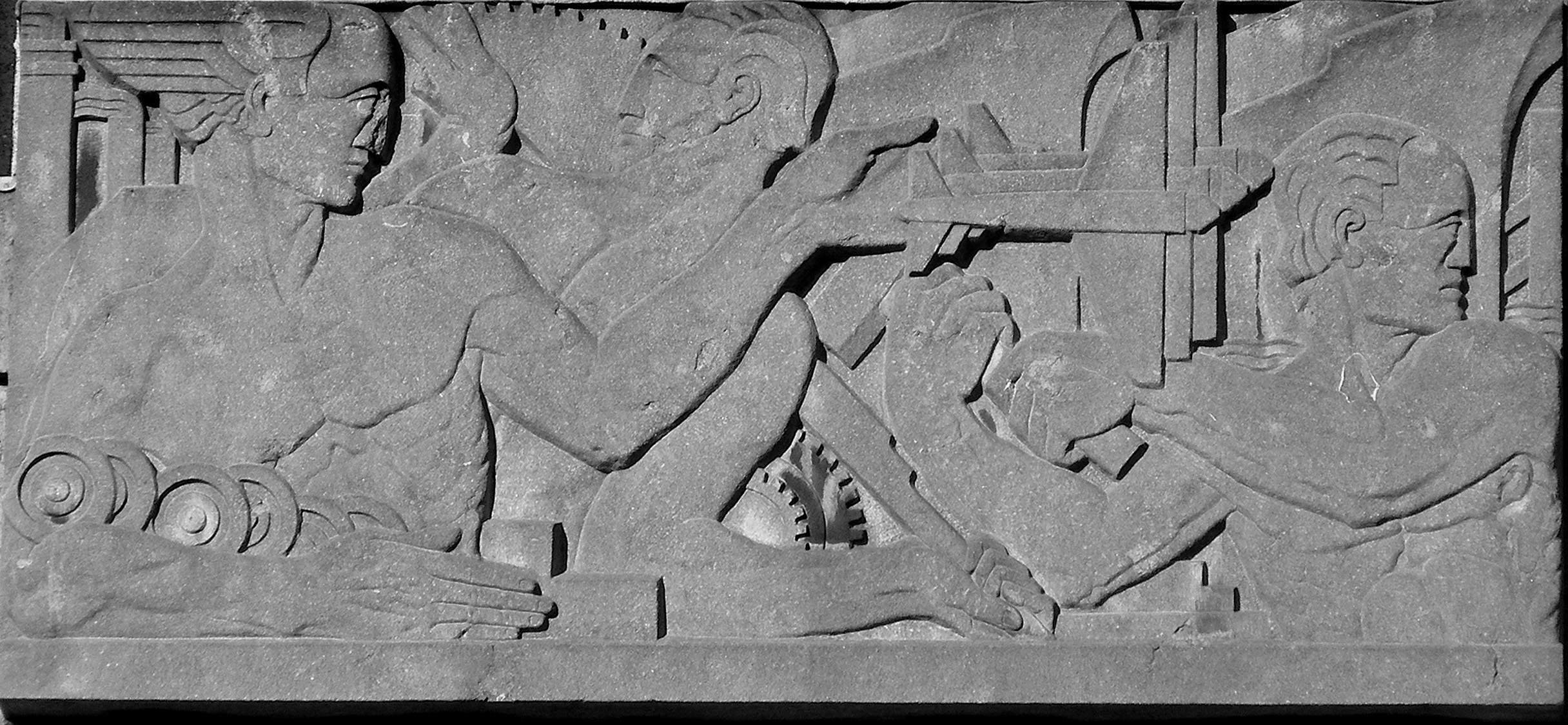
Panel over the door of the Department of Industry and Commerce Building, Kildare Street, carved by Hayes

- "Portrait of a young Boy" - Adams Auction House, St Stephens Green Dublin 2 (March 2020)
- Stations of the Cross (1933) in plaster relief, Willington Parish, Templeogue, Dublin.
- The Three Graces (1941), Dublin Institute of Technology, Cathal Brugha Street, Dublin. (Picture.)
- Bas-reliefs (1942) on the facade of Department of Industry and Commerce, Kildare Street, Dublin. Note that this building now holds the Dept. of Jobs, Enterprise and Innovation and the Dept. of Arts, Heritage and the Gaeltacht.
- Two bronze statues on sides altars of Glanworth church, County Cork (1944)
- Stone statue of Madonna and child in the grounds of the Servite Priory, Benburb, County Tyrone (1950).
- Carving of the Ascension and two mosaics on the face of the parish church in Gurranabraher, Cork. There is also a mosaic behind the altar of the day chapel inside the church (1953/4).
- Stone Madonna on the front facade of the parish church in Leixlip, County Kildare (1954).
- Bronze Madonna on the face of the church in the Black Valley, County Kerry (1955).
- Statue of Our Lady above the Franciscan Friary, Merchants Quay, Dublin (1955).
- Second of fourteen Stations of the cross, a stone carving in Saint John's Church, Tralee, County Kerry (1957). Note the other thirteen stations are paintings by Seán Keating who taught her in the Metropolitan School of Art.
- Stone statue of Saint Brendan in Saint John's Church, Tralee, County Kerry (1957).
- Bronze statue of Luke Wadding (1958), Greyfriars street, Waterford.
- Bronze Madonna on front facade of church in Westport, County Mayo (1960).
- Stations of the Cross in Portland stone (1958–76), Galway Cathedral consisting of 28 life size figures.
- Stone Holy Family on the face of the school of the Holy Family in Newbridge, County Kildare (1970).
- The Irish halfpenny, penny and two penny decimal coins (1971) (withdrawn from circulation in 2002 upon introduction of the euro).
