= Helen Watanabe-O'Kelly =

Helen Watanabe-O'Kelly is an Irish Germanist and founder of WiGS (Women in German Studies).

== Biography ==
Helen Watanabe-O'Kelly is Emeritus Fellow and Tutor in German at Exeter College, Oxford, and Professor of German Literature at Oxford University. She specialises in the early modern period, and is a distinguished scholar in this field, and in the field of German literature as a whole. She works in particular on European court culture in the early modern period and on German literature written by women or representing women; from 2005 to 2008 she co-directed the AHRC major research project at Oxford University entitled 'The Representation of Women and Death in German Literature, Art and Media, 1500–present'. She founded Women in German Studies (WiGS), the network for female Germanists of which she was the first president. She has been the president of the Society for Court Studies since 2017. In 2019, she was elected as a member of the Academia Europaeana.

She took her BA and MA at the National University of Ireland (University College Cork), and her doctorate at the University of Basel. She taught at the University of Reading until 1989, whereupon she was elected to the German fellowship at Exeter College, Oxford, a post from which she retired in 2013. She then took up a post in the Faculty of Modern Languages as project leader on 'Marrying Cultures: Queens Consort and European Identities 1500-1800' (2013-16). This was funded by HERA (Humanities in the European Research Area). In 2007, she was the Mellon Distinguished Visiting Professor at the University of Illinois. She was elected a Fellow of the British Academy in 2012. She was proposed for AcademiaNet by the DFG German Research Foundation. In 2016, she was a visiting professor at LMU Munich, and on 1 December of the same year, she was conferred with an honorary DLitt by the National University of Ireland. In 2018-19 she was a Fellow of the Institut d'Études Avancėes in Paris.

Her father was Professor Michael J. O'Kelly, professor of archaeology at University College, Cork, who discovered the midwinter illumination of Newgrange in 1967.

== Select bibliography ==
- 1992: Triumphall Shews: tournaments at German-speaking courts in their European context, 1560–1730, Gebr.Mann Verlag (English) ISBN 3-7861-1490-0
- 1997: (as editor) The Cambridge History of German Literature, Cambridge University Press ISBN 0-521-43417-3
- 2000 (with Anne Simon): Festivals and Ceremonies. A Bibliography of Works relating to Court, Civic and Religious Festivals in Europe 1500–1800, Continuum ISBN 978-0-7201-2182-7
- 2002: Court Culture in Early Modern Dresden, Palgrave Macmillan ISBN 0-333-98448-X
- 2004 (as editor with J. R. Mulryne and Margaret Shewring): Europa Triumphans. Court and Civic Festivals in Early Modern Europe, Ashgate ISBN 0-7546-3873-1. Now available from Ashgate as an e-book.
- 2009 (as editor with Sarah Colvin): Women and Death: Warlike Women in the German Literary and Cultural Imagination since 1500, Camden House. ISBN 978-1-57113-400-4
- 2010: Beauty or Beast? The Woman Warrior in the German Imagination from the Renaissance to the Present, Oxford University Press ISBN 978-0-19-955823-0
- 2016 (as editor with Adam Morton): Queens Consort, Cultural Transfer and European Politics, c.1500–1800, Abingdon: Routledge (ISBN 978-1472458384)
- 2021 Projecting Imperial Power. New Nineteenth-Century Emperors and the Public Sphere, Oxford University Press ISBN 978-0-19-880247-1
