= 1958 Birthday Honours =

British government recognitions

The Queen's Birthday Honours 1958 were appointments in many of the Commonwealth realms of Queen Elizabeth II to various orders and honours to reward and highlight good works by citizens of those countries. The appointments were made to celebrate the official birthday of The Queen. They were published on 3 June 1958 for the United Kingdom and Colonies, Australia, New Zealand, Ghana, and the Federation of Rhodesia and Nyasaland.

The recipients of honours are displayed here as they were styled before their new honour, and arranged by honour, with classes (Knight, Knight Grand Cross, etc.) and then divisions (Military, Civil, etc.) as appropriate.

== United Kingdom and Colonies ==
=== Baron ===
- Oliver Brian Sanderson Poole, CBE, TD. Member of Parliament for Oswestry, 1945-1950. Joint Treasurer, Conservative Party Organisation, 1952-1955; Chairman, 1955-1957; Deputy Chairman since 1957. For political and public services.
- Sir (Thomas) Ellis Robins, KBE, DSO, ED. For public services in Rhodesia.

=== Privy Councillor ===
- William Grant, TD, QC, MP. Member of Parliament for the Woodside Division of Glasgow since 1955. Solicitor General for Scotland since January 1955.
- Sir Godfrey John Vignoles Thomas, Bt, GCVO, KCB, CSI. Lately Private Secretary, to HRH The Duke of Gloucester.

=== Baronet ===
- Henry Arthur Benyon. For public services in Berkshire.
- David Martyn Evans Bevan, JP, DL. For public services, particularly to Commonwealth students from overseas.
- Lieutenant-Colonel Sir John Alexander Dunnington-Jefferson, DSO, DL. For public services in Yorkshire.

=== Knight Bachelor ===
- Thomas Henry Wait Armstrong, Principal, Royal Academy of Music.
- Jack Croft Baker, CBE. Lately President, British Trawlers Federation Ltd.
- Archer Ernest Baldwin, MC, MP. Member of Parliament for Leominster since 1945. For political and public services.
- Lieutenant-Colonel Reginald Lindsay Benson, DSO, MVO, MC, Honorary Treasurer, English-Speaking Union of the Commonwealth.
- William Rushton Black. For public services. Chairman, National Research & Development Corporation.
- Brigadier John Smith Knox Boyd, OBE, MD, FRCP. For services to bacteriology. President, Royal Society of Tropical Medicine and Hygiene.
- William Speight Carrington, Member of Council, Institute of Chartered Accountants in England and Wales.
- William Cash, Chairman, Girls' Public Day School Trust.
- Walter Alexander Edmenson, CBE, DL. For public services in Northern Ireland.
- Alderman John Wesley Emberton, JP, DL. For political and public services in Cheshire.
- David Lewis Evans, OBE, Deputy Keeper of the Records, Public Record Office.
- Professor Keith Grahame Feiling, OBE, Historian and Author.
- William Herbert Garrett, MBE. For services to industrial relations.
- Alderman Richard Stephenson Harper, JP. For political and public services in Manchester.
- James William Francis Hill, CBE. For services to the Association of Municipal Corporations.
- Friston Charles How, CB, Secretary, Atomic Energy Office.
- Willis Jackson, Director of Research and Education, Metropolitan-Vickers Electrical Co. Ltd.
- Kenneth Ivor Julian, CBE, Chairman, South East Metropolitan Regional Hospital Board.
- Alderman Ronald Barry Keefe. For political and public services in Norfolk.
- Colonel John Digby Mills, TD, DL. For political and public services in Hampshire.
- Colonel Frederick Austin Neill, CBE, DSO, TD, JP, DL. For public services in the West Riding of Yorkshire.
- Armand Hunter Kennedy Wilbraham Northey, JP. For political and public services in Wiltshire.
- John Sydney Pickles, Chairman, South of Scotland Electricity Board.
- Robert Rae, CB, Director, National Agricultural Advisory Service.
- Eric William Riches, MC, MS, FRCS, Surgeon and Urologist to Middlesex Hospital.
- John Edgar Robinson. For political and public services in Cheshire.
- William Clayton Russon, OBE, President, Festival of Wales.
- John Watt Senter, QC. For political services.
- Charles Archibald Philip Southwell, CBE, MC, Managing Director, Kuwait Oil Co. Ltd.
- John Newenham Summerson, CBE, Curator, Sir John Soane's Museum. For services to the history of Architecture.
- Professor Thomas Herbert Parry-Williams. For services to learning and literature in Wales.
- Gerald Wills, MBE, MP. Member of Parliament for Bridgwater since 1950. An Assistant Government Whip, 1952-1954; a Lord Commissioner of the Treasury, 1954-1957; Comptroller of Her Majesty's Household since 1957.
- Ian David Yeaman, President, The Law Society, 1957-58.

State of Queensland

- Brigadier Kenneth Barron Fraser, CBE, ED, MS, FRACS, late Australian Military Forces, of Brisbane. For public services.

State of South Australia

- The Honourable Collier Robert Cudmore, a Member of the Legislative Council, State of South Australia, since 1933.

State of Victoria

- The Honourable William John Farquhar McDonald, Speaker of the Legislative Assembly, State of Victoria.
- The Honourable Norman O'Bryan, a Judge of the Supreme Court, State of Victoria.
- Norman De Winton Robinson, Chairman of the Amateur Turf Club in the State of Victoria.

Commonwealth Relations

- Walter Harold Strachan Michelmore, MBE, a member of the United Kingdom business community in India.
- The Honourable John Murray Murray, Chief Justice of Southern Rhodesia.

Overseas Territories

- Roger Sewell Bacon, MBE. Lately Justice of Appeal, East African Court of Appeal.
- Cyril Handley Bird, CBE, Minister of Commerce & Works, Uganda.
- Colonel Aldington George Curphey, CBE, MC, ED, MD, CM. For public services in Jamaica.
- Edward John Davies, QC, Chief Justice, Tanganyika.
- Olumuyiwa Jibowu, Chief Justice of the High Courts of Lagos and Southern Cameroons, Federation of Nigeria.
- Arthur George Rixson Mooring, CMG, Deputy Governor, Western Region, Nigeria.
- George Edward Noel Oehlers, OBE. For public services in Singapore.
- Richard Ogilvy Ramage, CMG, Chairman, Public Service Commission, Uganda.
- Reginald William Taylor, CMG, Engineer-in-Chief, Office of the Crown Agents for Oversea Governments and Administrations, and Engineering Adviser to the Secretary of State for the Colonies.

=== Order of the Bath ===
==== Knight Grand Cross of the Order of the Bath (GCB) ====
Civil Division

- Sir David Milne, KCB, Permanent Under-Secretary of State, Scottish Office.

==== Knight Commander of the Order of the Bath (KCB) ====
Military Division

Royal Navy

- Vice-Admiral Walter Thomas Couchman, CB, CVO, DSO, OBE.
- Vice-Admiral Manley Lawrence Power, CB, CBE, DSO.

Army

- Lieutenant-General Roderick William McLeod, CB, CBE (31581), late Royal Regiment of Artillery.

==== Companion of the Order of the Bath (CB) ====
Military Division

Royal Navy

- Rear-Admiral Arthur Seymour Bolt, DSO, DSC.
- Rear-Admiral Thomas Vallack Briggs, OBE.
- The Venerable Archdeacon Frederick Darrell Bunt, OBE, Chaplain of the Fleet.
- Rear-Admiral William Godfrey Crawford, DSC.
- Rear-Admiral Charles Leo Glandore Evans, CBE, DSO, DSC.
- Rear-Admiral John Strike Lancaster.
- Rear-Admiral Anthony Cecil Capel Miers, VC, DSO.
- Rear-Admiral Peter Douglas Herbert Raymond Pelly, DSO.
- Surgeon Rear-Admiral Richard Louis Gibbon Proctor, MD, ChB.
- Rear-Admiral Royston Hollis Wright, DSC.

Army

- Major-General Frank Hastings Brooke, CBE, DSO (41079), late Infantry.
- Brigadier Michael Preston Douglas Dewar, CBE (34749), late Infantry.
- Brevet and Acting Colonel Martin St. John Valentine Gibbs, DSO, TD (73516), The Royal Wiltshire Yeomanry (Prince of Wales's Own), Royal Armoured Corps, Territorial Army.
- Major-General Frederick William Scriven Gordon-Hall, CBE (23877), late Royal Armoured Corps.
- Major-General St. John Cutler Hooley, CBE (26977), Royal Army Ordnance Corps.
- Major-General John Huston, QHS, MB, FRCS(Edin.) (27886), late Royal Army Medical Corps.
- Major-General Reginald Forster Johnstone, CBE (34843), late Infantry.
- Colonel Alastair Stevenson Pearson, DSO, OBE, MC, TD, ADC, DL (62792), Territorial Army.
- Colonel Walter John Macdonald Ross, OBE, MC, TD (66551), Territorial Army.
- Major-General Edward Dacre Howard-Vyse, CBE, MC (33342), late Royal Regiment of Artillery.

Royal Air Force

- Air Vice-Marshal Henry Rudolph Graham, CBE, DSO, DFC.
- Acting Air Vice-Marshal Lancelot Miller Corbet. CBE, MB, BS, (Ret'd).
- Air Commodore Hubert Huntlea Chapman, CBE.
- Air Commodore Kenneth John McIntyre, CBE, (Ret'd).
- Air Commodore Walter Allan Stagg, CBE.
- Air Commodore Walter Philip Sutcliffe, DFC.
- Acting Air Commodore William Steven Gardner, OBE, DFC, AFC.
- Acting Air Commodore John Andrews Tester, CBE, (Ret'd).

Civil Division

- George Sidney Bishop, OBE, Under-Secretary, Ministry of Agriculture, Fisheries & Food.
- Colonel Sir John Archibald Ruggles-Brise, Bt, OBE, TD, JP, DL, Chairman, Territorial and Auxiliary Forces Association of the County of Essex.
- Francis Blaise Gillie, Under-Secretary, Welsh Office, Ministry of Housing and Local Government.
- James Lawrence Girling, lately Comptroller-General, Patent Office & Industrial Property Department, Board of Trade.
- George Edward Godber, DM, FRCP, Deputy Chief Medical Officer, Ministry of Health.
- Ronald Frank Green, Second Secretary, Ministry of Finance, Northern Ireland.
- Thomas Edward Highton Hodgson, Under-Secretary, Munitions Supplies, Ministry of Supply.
- Colonel John Douglas Kewish, TD, DL, Chairman, Territorial and Auxiliary Forces Association of the County of Chester.
- William Lewis, Assistant Under-Secretary of State, Scottish Office.
- Morien Bedford Morgan, Deputy Director, Royal Aircraft Establishment, Farnborough.
- Frederick Ivor Ray, CBE, Director of Inland Telecommunications, General Post Office.
- James Gill Stewart, CBE, Under-Secretary, Ministry of Labour & National Service.

Additional Companion

- Lieutenant-Colonel The Honourable Martin Michael Charles Charteris, MVO, OBE, Assistant Private Secretary to The Queen.

=== Order of Merit (OM) ===
- Sir (Frank) Macfarlane Burnet, MD, FRCP.

=== Order of Saint Michael and Saint George ===
==== Knight Grand Cross of the Order of St Michael and St George (GCMG) ====
- Sir Robert Heatlie Scott, KCMG, CBE, Commissioner-General for Her Majesty's Government in the United Kingdom in South East Asia.

==== Knight Commander of the Order of St Michael and St George (KCMG) ====
- John Beresford Clark, CBE, Director of External Broadcasting, British Broadcasting Corporation.
- The Right Honourable Peter Alexander Rupert, Baron Carrington, MC, High Commissioner for the United Kingdom in the Commonwealth of Australia.
- Air Vice-Marshal Sir Robert Allingham George, KCVO, KBE, CB, MC, Royal Air Force (Ret'd), Governor of the State of South Australia.
- Kenneth Phipson Maddocks, CMG, Governor and Commander-in-Chief (Designate), Fiji.
- Edward Henry Windley, CMG, Governor and Commander-in-Chief (Designate), Gambia (dated 11 June 1958).
- Sir Peter William Shelley Yorke Scarlett, KCVO, CMG, Her Majesty's Ambassador Extraordinary and Plenipotentiary in Oslo.
- Richard Whittington, CBE, Her Majesty's Ambassador Extraordinary and Plenipotentiary in Bangkok.

==== Companion of the Order of St Michael and St George (CMG) ====
- George William Brazendale, Trade Commissioner, Grade I, Calcutta.
- Air Marshal Douglas Colyer, CB, DFC, (Ret'd), Civil Aviation Representative in Western Europe, Ministry of Transport & Civil Aviation.
- Peter Frank Dalrymple Tennant, OBE, Overseas Director, Federation of British Industries.
- The Honourable William Addison, OBE, MC, MM, Speaker of the Legislative Assembly, Southern Rhodesia.
- Edwin Cyril Geddes Barrett, formerly British Adviser, Kedah, Federation of Malaya.
- Ronald Harry Belcher, Deputy High Commissioner for the United Kingdom in the Union of South Africa.
- The Right Reverend James William Gleeson, Auxiliary Bishop to the Roman Catholic Archbishop of Adelaide, and Director of Catholic Education in the State of South Australia.
- Stanley Radcliffe Lewis. For public services in the State of Victoria.
- Brian Allan Marwick, CBE, Resident Commissioner of Swaziland.
- Arthur Edward Moore. For public and charitable services in the State of Queensland.
- John Philip Attenborough, CBE, Minister for Social Services, Tanganyika.
- Howard Reed Binns, OBE, Director, East African Veterinary Research Organisation.
- Trevor Charles Colchester, Permanent Secretary for Works, Kenya.
- Harold Owen Ellis, OBE, Director, Posts & Telegraphs, Federation of Nigeria.
- Walter Wyatt Grave, Principal of the University College of the West Indies.
- Cecil Augustus Hart, TD, Principal, Nigerian College of Arts, Science and Technology.
- Francis Dennis Hibbert, Chairman, Public Service Commission, Northern Region, Nigeria.
- Jack Haydon Lewis, OBE, Commissioner of Prisons, Kenya.
- James Malcolm Liston, MB, ChB, Director of Medical Services, Tanganyika.
- Lieutenant-Colonel Alec Lovelace, MBE, MC, Administrator, Antigua, Leeward Islands.
- Sultan Saleh bin Husein Al Audhali, CBE, Sultan of the Audhali State, Western Aden Protectorate.
- Amir Salih bin Hussein, Amir of Beihan, Western Aden Protectorate.
- Thomas Monier Skinner, MBE, Director of Establishments, Kenya.
- Stanley Toft Stewart, Deputy Chief Secretary, Singapore.
- Richard Leslie Vaughan Wilkes, Chairman, Public Service Commission, Sierra Leone.
- Geoffrey William Aldington, OBE, Her Majesty's Consul-General, Philadelphia.
- William Barker, OBE, Counsellor, Her Majesty's Embassy, Washington.
- James Currie, OBE, Her Majesty's Consul-General, São Paulo.
- Peter Gerald Fox Dalton, Foreign Office.
- Anthony Handley Lincoln, CVO, lately Counsellor, Her Majesty's Embassy, Copenhagen.
- Wilfred Wolters McVittie, Her Majesty's Ambassador Extraordinary and Plenipotentiary in Ciudad Trujillo.
- William James Macdonald Paterson, Counsellor (Commercial), Her Majesty's Embassy, Baghdad.
- Noel Marcus Prowse Reilly, Counsellor (Economic) to Her Majesty's Political Resident, Persian Gulf.
- John Wriothesley Russell, Counsellor, Her Majesty's Embassy, Tehran.
- John Laddie Simpson, TD, Foreign Office.
- Colonel John Teague, CBE, MC, lately Foreign Office.
- Alan Meredith Williams, Foreign Office.

=== Royal Victorian Order ===
==== Knight Grand Cross of the Royal Victorian Order (GCVO) ====
- Sir Owen Frederick Morshead, KCB, KCVO, DSO, MC.

==== Knight Commander of the Royal Victorian Order (KCVO) ====
- Captain Sir Arthur William Jarratt, Royal Naval Volunteer Reserve.
- John Douglas McLaggan, CVO, MB, ChB.

==== Commander of the Royal Victorian Order (CVO) ====
- James Crooks, FRCS.
- Sydney George Hearn, OBE.
- Denis Seward Laskey, CMG.
- The Honourable Olivia Vernon Mulholland.
- Cecil Bernard Oldman, CB.

==== Member of the Royal Victorian Order, 4th class (MVO) ====
- Humphrey Brooke.
- Zebedee Thomas Claro, OBE.
- Aydua Helen Scott-Elliot.
- William Charles Hall, MVO.
- Robert Lindsay, MVO, BEM.
- Commander Peter George Roots Mitchell, Royal Navy.
- Kenneth Newis.
- Commander Sydney Terence Turton Parsons, VRD, Royal Naval Volunteer Reserve.
- Commander Philip John Row, OBE, Royal Navy.

==== Member of the Royal Victorian Order, 5th class (MVO) ====
- Jack Ronald Finnimore.
- Phyllis Horsfield.

=== Order of the British Empire ===
==== Knight Grand Cross of the Order of the British Empire (GBE) ====
Civil Division

- The Right Honourable Walter McLennan, Baron Citrine, KBE. For public services.

==== Knight Commander of the Order of the British Empire (KBE) ====
Military Division

Royal Navy

- Vice-Admiral Hilary Worthington Biggs, CB, DSO.
- Rear-Admiral Kenyon Harry Terrell Peard, CBE.

Army

- Lieutenant-General John Guise Cowley, CB, CBE, AM (33330), late Corps of Royal Engineers.
- Major-General Lancelot Eric Cutforth, CB, CBE (641), Colonel Commandant, Royal Army Ordnance Corps. (Now retired.)

Royal Air Force

Civil Division

- Reginald John Ayres, CB, CBE, Deputy Secretary, Ministry of Power.
- Colonel Patrick James Blair, CBE, DSO, TD, DL. For political services in Scotland.
- Colonel Reginald John Cash, CB, CBE, MC, TD, JP, DL. Lately Chairman, Territorial and Auxiliary Forces Association, County of Warwick.
- John Harold Evans, CB, Deputy Chairman, Board of Inland Revenue.
- Walter Fergusson Crawford, CMG, OBE, Head of Middle East Development Division, Lebanon.
- Edward Thomas Lambert, CVO, CBE, Her Majesty's Consul-General, Paris.

==== Dame Commander of the Order of the British Empire (DBE) ====
Military Division

- Air Commandant Alice Mary Williamson, RRC, QHNS, Princess Mary's Royal Air Force Nursing Service.
- Air Commandant Mary Henrietta Barnett, CBE, ADC, Women's Royal Air Force.

Civil Division

- Katharine Elliot, CBE. For political and public services.
- The Most Noble Ivy, Duchess of Portland. For public services. Chairman of Council, National Association for the Prevention of Tuberculosis.
- Maggie Teyte. For services to music.

==== Commander of the Order of the British Empire (CBE) ====
Military Division

Royal Navy

- Captain Guy Wishaw Hawkins.
- Instructor Captain Albert Harvey Miles, OBE.
- Barbara Nockolds, RRC, Matron-in Chief, Queen Alexandra's Royal Naval Nursing Service.
- Captain John Denis Mansfield Robinson.

Army

- Colonel (temporary) Eric Henry Steele-Baume (53719), The Cameronians (Scottish Rifles).
- Brigadier Gerald Dominick Browne, OBE (34575), late Infantry.
- Colonel Hamish Magnus Campbell (38852), Royal Army Pay Corps.
- Brigadier Harold Percy Drayson (31544), late Corps of Royal Engineers (now RARO).
- Brigadier Kenneth David Ian Duncan (34422), late Royal Regiment of Artillery.
- Brigadier (temporary) (now Colonel) Joseph Russell Fishbourne, MBE (44094), late Royal Armoured Corps; Colonel, 3rd Carabiniers (Prince of Wales's Dragoon Guards).
- Brigadier (temporary) Richard George Fellowes Frisby, DSO, MC (52626), late Infantry.
- Colonel (temporary) Godfrey John Hamilton, DSO, OBE (380636), The Royal Irish Fusiliers (Princess Victoria's).
- Brigadier Charles Storrs Howard, DSO, OBE (36683), late Infantry.
- Brigadier (temporary) Hugh Marlborough Hale Ley, OBE (52635), late Royal Armoured Corps.
- Brigadier Ralph Henry Lefroy Oulton, OBE (30694), late Infantry (now RARO).
- Colonel Paul Eaton Pettit, OBE, MC, TD (66259), Territorial Army.
- Colonel (temporary) Robin Arthur Smart, MB (70117), Royal Army Medical Corps.
- Major-General (temporary) Charles Herbert Tarver, DSO (380334), late Infantry.
- Brigadier John Williams Wainwright (40414), late Royal Regiment of Artillery.
- Brigadier (temporary) Edward Alexander Wilmot Williams, OBE, MC (47677), late Infantry.

Royal Air Force

- Air Commodore Denis Aymard Wilson, AFC, MRCS, LRCP, QHS.
- Group Captain Russell Faulkner Aitken, OBE, AFC.
- Group Captain Robert John Barrow Burns, OBE.
- Group Captain Eric Cranston Harding.
- Group Captain Lewis MacDonald Hodges, DSO, OBE, DFC.
- Group Captain Stanley Wason Lane, MBE.
- Group Captain Thomas William Piper, OBE, AFC.
- Group Captain Denis Dart Rogers, OBE.
- Group Captain Frank William Stannard, (Ret'd).
- Group Captain Martin Charles Richard White.
- Acting Group Captain William Allan Hammerton.

Civil Division

- Thomas Alker, Town Clerk of Liverpool.
- Norman Allin, Opera Singer. Professor of Singing, Royal Academy of Music.
- James Amos, OBE, Chairman, Scottish Omnibuses Group, British Transport Commission.
- Olive Katherine Lloyd Lloyd-Baker, JP. For political and public services in Gloucestershire.
- George Edward David Ball, OBE. Regional Controller, London & South Eastern Region, Ministry of Labour & National Service.
- Frederick William Seek, Assistant Secretary, Ministry of Health.
- Dennis Bellamy, OBE, DL, Chairman, Yorkshire Electricity Board.
- Percy Archibald Thomas Bevan, Chief Engineer, Independent Television Authority.
- William Bathgate Tierney Blue, Commodore Chief Engineer, Peninsular and Oriental Steam Navigation Company Ltd.
- William Whytehead Boulton, TD, Secretary to the General Council of the Bar.
- Eric Fisher Bowman, Headmaster, Penistone Grammar School, Yorkshire.
- Norman Richard Rowley Brooke, JP. For political and public services in Wales.
- Thomas Walter Falconer Brown, Director, Parsons & Marine Engineering Turbine Research and Development Association.
- Matthew Busby. For services to association football.
- Daniel Fowler Cappell, FRSE MB ChB, Professor of Pathology, University of Glasgow.
- Einar Athelstan Gordon Caröe, Deputy Chairman, Trustee Savings Banks Association.
- Lieutenant-Colonel Frank Colleton Cave, TD, Chairman, North Middlesex Valuation Panel.
- Alderman George Frederick Chaplin, JP. For political and public services in Essex.
- Captain William Robert Chaplin, Elder Brother, Corporation of Trinity House.
- Eric Kirkham Cole, Chairman and Managing Director, E. K. Cole Ltd., Southend-on-Sea, Essex.
- Alderman Thomas Loftus Cole, JP. For political and public services in Belfast.
- John Corner, Senior Superintendent, Physics Division, Atomic Weapons Research Establishment, Aldermaston, United Kingdom Atomic Energy Authority.
- Thomas Coughtrie, Chairman, Belmos Co. Ltd., Lanarkshire.
- James Cowan, Principal Electrical Inspector, Mines Inspectorate, Ministry of Power.
- Samuel Sidney Dowds, JP. For public services in Londonderry.
- Alexander Edward Thomas Farquharson, OBE, Principal Executive Officer, Ministry of Agriculture, Fisheries & Food.
- Sidney Alec Findlay, OBE, General Manager, Scottish Special Housing Association.
- Stanley George Gains, Assistant Solicitor, Office of HM Procurator General & Treasury Solicitor.
- Roy Hatton Gill Garside, Regional Controller, London (Inner) Region, Ministry of Pensions & National Insurance.
- Lieutenant-Colonel James Archibald Garton, MC, JP, DL. For public and antiquarian services in Somerset.
- Geoffrey Gee, Sir Samuel Hall Professor of Chemistry, University of Manchester.
- Val Henry Gielgud, OBE, Head of Drama (Sound), British Broadcasting Corporation.
- Humphry Gifford, JP, Chairman, Dorset Agricultural Executive Committee.
- Brigadier John Wesley Harper Gow, OBE, JP, DL. For political and public services in the West of Scotland.
- Lieutenant-Colonel George Ambrose Grounds, DSO, TD, DL. For political and public services in the County of Lincolnshire (Parts of Holland).
- John Fiddes Hall, Chairman of Governors, Robert Gordon's Colleges, Aberdeen.
- Charles Skinner Hallpike, MB, FRCP, Director, Otological Research Unit, Medical Research Council.
- William Beverley Harrow, Managing Director, North Star Steam Fishing Co. Ltd.; Chairman, Aberdeen Steam Fishing Vessels Owners' Association Ltd.
- Henry Harvey, OBE, Assistant Secretary, Air Ministry.
- Jack (John Edward) Hawkins, Actor.
- William James Heasman, HM Inspector of Schools (Staff Inspector), Ministry of Education.
- Edward Ernest Wren-Hilton. For political and public services in Lancashire.
- Sydney Ivon Kitchens, Artist.
- Henry Smith Holden, Forensic Science Adviser, Home Office.
- Alderman Thomas Hollins, OBE, Member (lately Chairman), Staffordshire Agricultural Executive Committee.
- Frank Robert Horne, Director, National Institute of Agricultural Botany, Cambridge.
- The Right Honourable Henry Frederick, Baron Hotham, DL. For public services in the East Riding of Yorkshire.
- John Elliot Jackson, Director of Royal Ordnance Factories, Ministry of Supply.
- Richard Leofric Jackson, Assistant Commissioner, Metropolitan Police.
- Celia Johnson, Actress.
- Harold Stewart Kirkaldy, Chairman of Wages Boards and Councils; Professor of Industrial Relations, University of Cambridge.
- Rudolf Lessing, President, National Society for Clean Air.
- Sydney Henry Levine, Assistant Secretary, Board of Trade.
- Randal John Lewis, Controller of Supplies, General Post Office.
- Seton Howard Frederick Lloyd, OBE, Director, British Institute of Archaeology, Ankara.
- Captain Kenneth Campbell McCallum, MC, Managing Director, Trust Houses Ltd.
- William Angus Macfarlane, Chief Executive, National Industrial, Fuel Efficiency Service.
- Stevenson Moir Mackenzie, DSC, Principal Executive Officer, Foreign Office.
- Jean MacIver Mackintosh, MD, Administrative Medical Officer of Health for Maternity and Child Welfare, Birmingham.
- John Marshall, Farmer, Perthshire. For services to farming in Scotland.
- Alderman John Barker Maudsley. For political and public services in Berkshire.
- Lieutenant-General George Noble Molesworth, CSI, OBE, Member of the National Savings Committee representing-the Southern Region.
- Walter Nugent Bligh Monck, OBE. Lately Director of Maddermarket Theatre, Norwich.
- Eric Stanley Moult, Director and Chief Engineer, de Havilland Engine Company Ltd., Edgware, Middlesex.
- Frank Gordon Murray, Director of Catering, Ministry of Supply.
- George McIntosh Murray, Journalist.
- Evan Augustus Norton, Chairman, United Birmingham Hospitals.
- Edwin Hart Nurse, Deputy Government Chemist.
- Major John Martin Oakey, MC, DL. For political and public services in London.
- Winifred Palmour, JP. For political and public services in Preston.
- Alderman David Plinston, Chairman, Warrington Local Employment Committee.
- Terence Mervyn Rattigan, Playwright.
- Francis Bertram Reece, lately Chairman, Poisons Board, Home Office.
- Bernard Charles Reilly, Inspector General of Waterguard, Board of Customs & Excise.
- David Arthur Richards, Chairman, Flint Agricultural Executive Committee.
- Mildred Riddelsdell, Under-Secretary, Ministry of Pensions & National Insurance.
- Leonard Alfred Sayce, Superintendent, Light Division, National Physical Laboratory, Department of Scientific & Industrial Research.
- Herbert Alexander Smith, Deputy Chief Inspector of Taxes, Board of Inland Revenue.
- Frederick Sidney Snow, OBE, Consulting Engineer.
- Alderman Charles Sidney Bowen Wentworth-Stanley, Member, North East Metropolitan Regional Hospital Board; Member, Board of Governors, London Hospital.
- John Francis Thistleton, Lately Organising Secretary, Musicians' Benevolent Fund.
- Edgar Thomas, Professor of Agricultural Economics; Provincial Agricultural Economist and Dean of the Faculty of Agriculture and Horticulture, University of Reading.
- John Crighton Thompson, Deputy Director of Electrical Engineering, Admiralty.
- Alderman Alan Livesey Stuart Todd, JP. For political and public services in Staffordshire and Worcestershire.
- Henry Woodall Townley, OBE, Member, National Insurance Advisory Committee. Secretary, National Conference of Friendly Societies.
- William Warren Triggs, Fellow of the Chartered Institute of Patent Agents. Senior partner, Marks & Clerk.
- Alexander Copper Trotter, JP, Editor, Scottish Daily Express. For public services.
- Henry Bernard Turle, OBE, Member, Capital Issues Committee.
- Florence Nellie Udell OBE, Chief Nursing Officer, Colonial Office.
- Conrad Hal Waddington, Honorary Director, Agricultural Research Council Unit of Animal Genetics; Buchanan Professor of Animal Genetics, University of Edinburgh.
- Colonel George Gustavus Walker, MC, TD, DL, Chairman, Territorial and Auxiliary Forces Association, County of Dumfries.
- William Lumsden Walker, Assistant Secretary, Scottish Home Department.
- Professor Ross Douglas Waller, MBE, Director of Extra-Mural Studies, University of Manchester.
- William Warnock Watt. For services to the Admiralty and other Departments.
- Lieutenant-Colonel Herbert James Wells, MC, JP. For political and public services in Surrey.
- Andrew John Williamson, Registrar of Death Duties, Edinburgh, Board of Inland Revenue.
- Fred Williamson, OBE, Chairman of the Traffic Commissioners for Public Service Vehicles, North Western Traffic Area.
- Gerald Howard Wilson, Chairman and Managing Director, Laurence, Scott & Electromotors Ltd., Norwich.
- Colonel Robert Pearson Winter, MC, TD, DL, Vice-Chairman, Territorial and Auxiliary Forces Association, County of Northumberland.
- Harold Woolley, Farmer. Formerly Deputy President, National Farmers' Union for England & Wales.

- Charles Frederick Tilney-Bassett, Manager of Barclays Bank in Tripoli.
- Major Charles Rowland Chadwick, OBE, British subject resident in Iraq.
- John Nicholas Rede Elliott, OBE, First Secretary, Her Majesty's Embassy, Vienna.
- John Meurig Evans, General Manager of the Shell Oil Company, Thailand.
- Kathleen Mary Graham, MBE, Her Majesty's Deputy Consul-General, New York.
- Professor Michael Grant, OBE, Vice Chancellor of Khartoum University.
- Herbert Leslie Greenleaves, Her Majesty's Consul-General, Lyons.
- The Reverend Canon Ralph Boyes Jackson, Headmaster of St. George's College, Buenos Aires.
- William Alfred Brand. For public services in the State of Queensland, especially to the sugar industry.
- William John Brens, a Councillor for the City of Melbourne, State of Victoria, for many years.
- Leonard St. Craig Clarkson, a prominent businessman of Adelaide, State of South Australia.
- Edward Robert Cowper Gallop, Chairman of the Housing Commission, State of New South Wales.
- George Mervyn Gray, Under-Secretary and Permanent Head of the Premier's Department, State of New South Wales.
- William John Kilpatrick. For services to philanthropic and social welfare movements in the State of Victoria.
- Anthony James Douglas Carysfort Loch, Secretary for Commerce and Industry, Federation of Malaya.
- Cobden Parkes, Government Architect, State of New South Wales.
- Bernard Flewell-Smith, MM. For services to the fruit and vegetable industry in the State of Queensland.
- James Robert Webb, of Bulawayo, Southern Rhodesia. For public services.
- Charles Hugh Fairfax Apthorp, MVO, Commissioner, Nyasaland Police Force.
- Cedric Blaker, MC, ED, JP. For public services in Hong Kong.
- Commander Charles Skinner Bushe, Royal Navy (Retd.) For public services in Trinidad.
- Frank Holmes Christie. For public services in the Bahamas.
- Lieutenant-Colonel William Howat Leslie Gordon, MBE, MC. For public services in Uganda.
- John Hayward, OBE, Financial Secretary, Gibraltar.
- Adamu Jimba, Emir of Bauchi, Northern Region, Nigeria.
- Douglas Joseph Judah. For public services in Jamaica.
- James Lionel King, OBE, Resident Engineer in London, of the Electricity Corporation of Nigeria.
- Percy William King, OBE, Chairman, Public Service Commission, British Guiana.
- Chief Akinpelu Obisesan, OBE. For services to the Co-operative movement in the Western Region, Nigeria.
- George Douglas Laurie Pile, OBE. For public services in Barbados.
- Henry Arthur Stamers Smith, Director of Surveys, Federation of Nigeria.
- John Robert Philpott Soper, Director of Agriculture, Tanganyika.
- Alexander William Grant Trantor. For public services in Aden.
- William Borthwick Tudhope, Director of Education, Cyprus.
- Harold Maxwell Watson, OBE, Overseas Audit Service, Auditor General of the Federation of Malaya, and Director of Audit, Singapore.
- Paul Octave Wiehe, Director, Mauritius Sugar Industry Research Institute.
- The Right Reverend Francis Oliver Green-Wilkinson, MC, The Lord Bishop of Northern Rhodesia.
- Godfrey Pountney Willoughby, OBE. Lately Chairman, Governing Council, Royal Technical College, Nairobi, Kenya.
- John Maurice Wilson, Director of Education, North Borneo.

==== Officer of the Order of the British Empire (OBE) ====
Military Division

Royal Navy

- The Reverend William Henry Stanley Chapman, Chaplain.
- Superintendent Jean Davies, MBE, Women's Royal Naval Service.
- Commander William Sidney Graham Edward, (Ret'd).
- Commander Michael Roger Eaton Faning, DSC, Royal Malayan Navy.
- Captain Howard Douglas Gausden, DSO, Royal Fleet Auxiliary Service.
- Captain Ian Graeme Gibson, (Ret'd) (on loan to the Government of India).
- Instructor Commander Denis William Lacey.
- Commander Denys Acland Lawford.
- Commander John Cecil Gilbert Martin.
- Lieutenant-Colonel John Richards, MBE, Royal Marines.
- Commander Charles William Haimes Shepherd.
- Commander William Vyvyd Stitt, (Ret'd).
- Commander Archibald Edward Sutcliffe, DSC, (Ret'd).
- Acting Commander Horace Benjamin Webb.

Army

- Lieutenant-Colonel the Honourable Christopher John Beckett (64074), 9th Queen's Royal Lancers, Royal Armoured Corps.
- Lieutenant-Colonel John Brian Birkett (69080), Royal Corps of Signals.
- Lieutenant-Colonel (Technical Officer, Telecommunications) Eric Gordon Brice (163447), Royal Corps of Signals.
- Lieutenant-Colonel John Brown (184850), Royal Army Ordnance Corps.
- Major Lady Martha Veronica Bruce, TD (282096), Women's Royal Army Corps, Territorial Army.
- Lieutenant-Colonel (temporary) Denis Henry Dryburgh Burbridge, MRCS, LRCP, DPH (135393), Royal Army Medical Corps.
- Lieutenant-Colonel (temporary) Eric John Burnet (191727), Royal Army Pay Corps.
- Lieutenant-Colonel Bruce Martin Birkmyre Coats, TD (277862), Royal Armoured Corps, Territorial Army.
- Lieutenant-Colonel Alexander James Henry Cramsie, DL (50880), Royal Armoured Corps, Territorial Army.
- Lieutenant-Colonel Richard Stewart Palliser Dawson (53629), Royal Regiment of Artillery.
- Lieutenant-Colonel John Leonard Grey Dudley (375885), Royal Regiment of Artillery.
- Major George Eastburn (259166), Corps of Royal Engineers.
- Lieutenant-Colonel (now Colonel (temporary)) Lindsay Valentine Francis Fawkes, DSO, MC (58033), Royal Regiment of Artillery.
- Lieutenant-Colonel (acting) Arthur Field, MC, ERD, TD (66997), Combined Cadet Force.
- Lieutenant-Colonel Richard Henry Arundell Peat Finney (32721), Royal Army Ordnance Corps.
- Lieutenant-Colonel Ernest Clement Gould (72811), Royal Army Educational Corps.
- Lieutenant-Colonel Basil Leslie Gunnell, MC (66280), The Royal Warwickshire Regiment.
- Lieutenant-Colonel (now Colonel) John Harington (58011), late Royal Regiment of Artillery.
- Lieutenant-Colonel Peter Michael Jermyn Harrison, MC (73141), The Royal Sussex Regiment, Territorial Army.
- Lieutenant-Colonel Peter Hadwen Henson (68521), Royal Army Service Corps.
- Lieutenant-Colonel (temporary) George Huntly Hodgson (66101), The Royal Fusiliers (City of London Regiment).
- Lieutenant-Colonel Edward Arthur Hutchings, TD (76221), The South Lancashire Regiment (Prince of Wales's Volunteers), Territorial Army.
- Lieutenant-Colonel Myrddin Jones, MBE, TD (64064), Royal Regiment of Artillery, Territorial Army.
- Lieutenant-Colonel Claude Henry Lincoln (66094), The King's Own Royal Regiment (Lancaster).
- Lieutenant-Colonel James Doiran Lunt (73138), 16th/5th The Queen's Royal Lancers, Royal Armoured Corps.
- Lieutenant-Colonel Christopher Mark Morrice Man, MC (63924), The Middlesex Regiment (Duke of Cambridge's Own).
- Lieutenant-Colonel Peter Harry Mitchell May, DSO, MC (56729), The Durham Light Infantry.
- Lieutenant-Colonel (temporary) David McBain, ARCM (384888).
- Lieutenant-Colonel Alec Frank Monk, TD (65145), Mobile Defence Corps, Army Emergency Reserve.
- Lieutenant-Colonel Arthur James Jardine Paterson, TD (88758), The King's Own Scottish Borderers, Territorial Army (now TARO).
- Lieutenant-Colonel Sidney Renton (188457), Corps of Royal Electrical & Mechanical Engineers, Territorial Army.
- Lieutenant-Colonel Raoul Charles Lempriere-Robin (62987), Coldstream Guards.
- Lieutenant-Colonel Philip John Roper, TD (71683), The Dorset Regiment Territorial Army (now TARO).
- Lieutenant-Colonel Reginald Cecil Rose (63517), Royal Regiment of Artillery.
- Lieutenant-Colonel Richard Vernon Russell, MBE (53730), The East Lancashire Regiment.
- Brevet (now Honorary) Lieutenant-Colonel Thomas Christopher Sinclair, MC (67795), The Rifle Brigade (Prince Consort's Own) (now RARO).
- Lieutenant-Colonel John Sidney Herbert Smitherman, ERD (63257), The Suffolk Regiment, Territorial Army.
- Lieutenant-Colonel (acting) Robert George Hendley Joseph Sutton (340154), Army Cadet Force.
- Brevet and Temporary Lieutenant-Colonel Thomas Norman Samuel Wheeler (66180), The Royal Ulster Rifles.
- Colonel (temporary) (now Brevet and Temporary Lieutenant-Colonel) Alan Herring Parnaby, MBE, (140148), Royal Army Ordnance Corps; formerly on loan to the Government of Pakistan.

Royal Air Force

- Wing Commander Robert Arthur Colville (59075).
- Wing Commander Peter Codner Dainty, MBE (44921).
- Wing Commander Henry Hamilton Clifford Hester (44842).
- Wing Commander John Cowan Hunter (39282).
- Wing Commander Stanley Robert Hyland, DFC, AFC (44978).
- Wing Commander Frederick Latham, MD, ChB (202834).
- Wing Commander John Lawley Lendrem (45870).
- Wing Commander Thomas Andrew Melville Pritchard (46278).
- Wing Commander Alan Charles Rawlinson, DFC, AFC (59236).
- Wing Commander Robert Dickson Romanis (43888).
- Wing Commander Roddick Lee Smith (37129).
- Wing Commander John Henry Stevens (73412).
- Wing Commander Richard Gordon Wakeford, AFC (133508).
- Wing Commander Roger Henry Whipp (46361).
- Acting Wing Commander Cyril Edward Cahill (46726).
- Acting Wing Commander George Edward Winn (63556), Royal Air Force Volunteer Reserve (Training Branch).
- Squadron Leader Andrew Bruce (39268).
- Squadron Leader Arthur Graham Douglass, AFC (150340).
- Squadron Leader John Gale (183020).
- Squadron Leader David Ralph Locke (152643).
- Squadron Leader Denis Thomas Stanley (47622).

Civil Division

- Matthew Abbott, Assistant Regional Controller, Northern Region, Ministry of Labour & National Service.
- Alderman John Valentine Allen, JP, Deputy Chairman, Westmorland Agricultural Executive Committee.
- William Thomas Ash, Secretary, Radio & Electronic Component Manufacturers' Federation.
- Reginald Charles Ashman, MBE, Vice Chairman, Bristol Savings Committee.
- Captain Alan Magnay Atkinson, Marine Superintendent, Common Brothers Ltd., Newcastle upon Tyne.
- Harold Carew Baker, Divisional Manager, Far East, Cable & Wireless Ltd., Hong Kong.
- Edward Baldry. Lately Vice-President, Society of Incorporated Accountants.
- Annie Longson Barker, JP. For public services in Stoke-on-Trent, Staffordshire.
- Alexander Ernest Barnes, Staff Controller, Post Office Savings Department, General Post Office.
- Sweyn Emerson Barnes, Training Secretary, Boys' Brigade.
- Reginald Charles Bentley, Chief Officer, Bolton Fire Brigade.
- Stanley Joseph Docking Berger, MC, Director, Institute of Cost & Works Accountants.
- Robert Black, Chairman, South Ayrshire National Insurance Appeal Tribunal.
- Alfred George Blows, Registrar General of Shipping and Seamen, Ministry of Transport & Civil Aviation.
- Thomas George William Boxall, Head of Research Department, London Brick Co. Ltd.
- Bernard Joseph Brady, Senior Chief Executive Officer, War Office.
- The Reverend Canon Evelyn Foley Braley, Chairman, Worcester Local Employment Committee.
- Captain Cecil Walter Brockman, Royal Navy (Ret'd), Comptroller and Secretary, Trafalgar Services Club, Portsmouth.
- Basil George Brooke, MD, BCh, Chairman, Medical Board, Manchester, under the National Service Acts.
- Alderman Eleanor Graham Cain, JP. For services in Workington, Cumberland.
- Alexander Mackay Calder, MB, FRCS(Ed), Surgeon, Newtownards Hospital, County Down.
- John Campbell, JP. For political services in County Antrim.
- Allen Boyd Carpenter, Assistant Comptroller, London County Council.
- Annie Clara Bindon Carter, MBE, Director and Honorary Secretary, Painted Fabrics Ltd. For services to disabled ex-servicemen.
- Daniel Chapman, MBE, Chief Executive Officer, HM Treasury.
- Charles Henry Clark, Deputy Chairman, Lancashire Agricultural Executive Committee.
- Harold John Clarke, Principal, Ministry of Health.
- Harry Stanley Clarke, JP. For public services in West Ham.
- Michael Thomas Emilius Clayton, attached War Office.
- William Edward Coles, Deputy Director of Audit, Exchequer and Audit Department.
- William Edgar Cone, Technical Adviser, British Road Tar Association.
- Philip Herbert Constable, Secretary and House Governor, St George's Hospital, London.
- John Bridgeford Maxwell Coppock, Director of Research, Spillers Ltd. Lately Director, British Baking Industries Research Association.
- Samuel Smith Corbett. For public services in County Armagh.
- Thomas Currah Crawhall, Assistant Director, Mechanical Engineering Research Laboratory, Department of Scientific & Industrial Research.
- Kenneth Edward Crickmore, Secretary and General Manager, The Halle Concerts Society.
- Captain Denys Robert Patrick Cunningham. Lately Commodore Master, SS Kenya, British-India Steam Navigation Company Ltd.
- Lieutenant-Colonel Kenelm Antony Philip Dalby, DSO. For political and public services in Bristol.
- Reginald Jack Daniel, Constructor, Naval Construction Department, Admiralty.
- Raymond Bailey Darby, MBE, Chairman, Croydon Savings Committee.
- John Llewelyn Davies. For services as Councillor, Merioneth County Council.
- Richard William Reynolds-Davies, Secretary, Institute of Fuel.
- William Wallace Davies, General Manager, C. H. Bailey Ltd., Tyne Engine & Ship Repairing Works, Barry Docks.
- Frederick James Dent, Director of Research, Gas Council Midlands Research Station, Solihull, Warwickshire.
- James Gilbert Eadie, Alderman, Breconshire County Council.
- Donald Isaac Edwards, Head of External Services News Department, British Broadcasting Corporation.
- Richard Underhill Langworthy Edwards, Senior Chief Executive Officer, Ministry of Pensions & National Insurance.
- Edward James Augustus Engleback, Principal Inspector, Board of Customs & Excise.
- Geoffrey Herbert Evans, MBE, Grade A III Officer, Government Communications Headquarters.
- John Thomas Fallon, JP. For political and public services in Smethwick.
- Thomas Shaw Fazackerley, Principal, Rainey Endowed School, Magherafelt, County Londonderry.
- Robert Forman, JP, Managing Director, Caledonian Fish Selling & Marine Stores Co. Ltd., Peterhead.
- Alderman Ralph Henry Shoolbred Fox, MC, Chairman, Civil Defence Committee, Essex, and Civil Defence Controller, Essex.
- Major Albert Victor Franklin, TD, Divisional Veterinary Officer, Ministry of Agriculture, Fisheries & Food.
- Lindley Macnaghten Fraser, Head of German Service, British Broadcasting Corporation.
- Herman Robert Frederick, MB, ChB, General Medical Practitioner, Port Talbot.
- John Allen Freeman, Principal Scientific Officer, Ministry of Agriculture, Fisheries & Food.
- Ernest David Fryer, MBE, Chief Executive Officer, Ministry of Transport & Civil Aviation.
- Major Austin Gardner, MC, Chairman of Directors, Seasalter & Ham Oyster Fishery Co. Ltd., Whitstable, Kent.
- John Keble Garland, Senior Chief Executive Officer, Air Ministry.
- Harold Vernon Garner, Principal Scientific Officer, Rothamsted Experimental Station, Harpenden.
- John Boyd Getty. Lately Chairman, Agricultural Wages Board for Northern Ireland.
- William Henry Good. For political and public services in Kingston-on-Hull.
- Bertha Mary Grainger, MBE, Principal, Ministry of Labour & National Service.
- Alderman Morris Philip Greengross, Chairman, Holborn Savings Committee.
- William Graham Greig, JP. For political and public services in Glasgow.
- Joseph Gordon Grimshaw, Regional Controller, North Western Region, National Assistance Board.
- Charles Barnard Groves, Conductor, Bournemouth Symphony Orchestra.
- Leonard Arthur Hackett, JP, General Secretary, National Association of Almshouses.
- John Robertson Campbell Hamilton, Inspector of Ancient Monuments, Ministry of Works.
- Alfred Edmund Hancock, Chief Executive Officer, Ministry of Pensions & National Insurance.
- Philip Llewellyn Handley. Lately Chairman, Warwickshire Rural Community Council.
- Reginald Hargreaves Harris. For services to sport as a racing cyclist.
- Douglas Neill Harrison, Principal Scientific Officer, Meteorological Office, Air Ministry.
- Herbert Wesley Hart, MBE, Chief Executive Officer, Commonwealth Relations Office.
- Gertrude Hasell. For political and public services in Cumberland.
- John Hatton, Chairman, Bath Disablement Advisory Committee.
- Harold Charles Hawkins, Principal, Air Ministry.
- Lionel Haworth, Chief Designer, Civil Engines, Rolls-Royce Ltd., Derby.
- Alderman Sidney Charles Hayne. For political and public services in Luton.
- Wilfred Horsfall, Principal, George Horsfall & Son, Liversedge.
- William Llewellyn Howell, Secretary, Welsh Tourist Board.
- William Edward Hudson, Chief Regional Engineer, Home Counties Region, General Post Office.
- David Salmon Schuster Hutton, Statistician, Ministry of Education.
- Charles Arthur Le Mesurier Irving, Principal, Ministry of Agriculture, Fisheries & Food.
- Wing Commander Fred Fisher James. For political services in Southampton.
- Gertrude Hope James, Headmistress, St. Frideswide's Modern School, Didcot.
- Francis Joseph Jenkinson, Chairman, Kesteven, Lincolnshire County Council.
- Margaret Florence Jobson, JP, Member, Scottish Advisory Council on Child Care.
- David John Columbus-Jones, Grassland Husbandry Advisory Officer, Grade I, Ministry of Agriculture, Fisheries & Food.
- Philip Alexander Dickinson Jones, Principal Information Officer, Export Credits Guarantee Department.
- Thomas Rees Jones, Secretary, Staff Side, Civil Service National Whitley Council.
- Sidney Kaye. For services to the Home Office.
- Archibald Henry William Kimberlin, Chairman, Leicester District Advisory Committee, North Midland Regional Board for Industry.
- Arthur Henry King, Representative, British Council, Pakistan.
- Ronald Collingburn Knight, Senior Principal Scientific Officer, Ministry of Defence.
- Harry Kroll, Chief Executive Officer, Civil Service Commission.
- Cyril Charles Ings Lambert, MBE, Chief Executive Officer, Board of Trade.
- Wing Commander Reginald Charles Lawes, Senior Overseas Liaison Officer, International Aeradio Ltd.
- Gertrude Leeson, MBE, Chairman, Birkenhead, Wallasey, Wirral & District War Pensions Committee.
- Helen Lessore, Director, Beaux Arts Gallery, London.
- Unity Viola Lister. For political and public services in London.
- Alderman Walter David Little, Chairman, Brook Green and Walham Green Local Employment Committee.
- Thomas Alwyn Lloyd JP, Architect and Planning Consultant. Chairman, Council for the Preservation of Rural Wales.
- Kenneth La Trobe Lockstone. For political and public services.
- Frederick Cyril Jeffrey Lofting, Senior Inspector of Taxes, Board of Inland Revenue.
- Joseph Neville Macfarlane, Chief Accountant, Ministry of Power.
- Donald Mackechnie, Headmaster, Inveraray Grammar Junior Secondary School.
- Angus Macleod, County Surveyor, Perth & Kinross Joint County Council.
- Alfred Neill Macmahon, Principal Officer, Ministry of Agriculture, Northern Ireland.
- Brian Lonsdale McMillan, Water Engineer and Manager, Wolverhampton Corporation.
- Thomas Mahood, MBE, Chairman, County Down Savings Committee.
- Reginald William Mann, Chairman, Tyneside Productivity Committee.
- William Gregory Marley, Chief Radiological Safety Officer, Atomic Energy Research Establishment, Harwell, United Kingdom Atomic Energy Authority.
- John George Marsden, Assistant Director of Victualling, Admiralty.
- Robert Menzies, Assistant Chief Quantity Surveyor, Ministry of Works.
- Eleanor Jeanette Merry, General Superintendent, Queen's Institute of District Nursing.
- Arthur Harold Midgley, Principal Information Officer, Central Office of Information.
- Edward Vincent Perronet Miller, Senior Air Traffic Control Officer, Northern Division, Ministry of Transport & Civil Aviation.
- Francis Alexander Mexican, Divisional Industrial Relations Director, Northern Division, National Coal Board.
- Francis Sydney Milligan, MC, MM, Secretary, National Federation of Community Associations.
- Ernest Ferguson Milne, Partner, Thomson, McLintock & Co.
- The Reverend William Henry Goodenough Milnes, MC. Lately Principal, Elizabeth College, Guernsey.
- Percy William Mobbs. For political and public services in Suffolk.
- John Henry Morley, Engineer I, Royal Radar Establishment, Ministry of Supply.
- George Murray, Production Controller, Engineering Group, Remploy Ltd.
- Clifford Walter Musgrave, Director of the Public Libraries, Museums and Art Gallery, Brighton.
- Daphne Chaworth-Musters. For political and public services in the East Midlands.
- Thomas Oswald Nicholls. For political and public services in Brecknockshire and Radnorshire.
- Edward Ivan Oliver, DSO, TD, United Kingdom Trade Commissioner, Grade II, Lagos, Nigeria.
- Elsie Maude Strom-Olsen. For political and public services in Essex.
- Douglas Osmond, Chief Constable, Shropshire Constabulary.
- Lieutenant-Colonel Dennis Spencer Over, MBE, TD, Secretary, Territorial & Auxiliary Forces Association, County of Surrey.
- William Paterson, Chief Constable, Inverness Burgh Police Force.
- Joseph Anthony Peacocke, County Inspector, Royal Ulster Constabulary (Commissioner of Police for Belfast).
- Bertie Reginald Pearn, Assistant (Grade I), Research Department, Foreign Office.
- Kathleen Pettigrew, MBE, Senior Chief Executive Officer, Foreign Office.
- George Austin Phillips, Chairman, Trafford Park Savings Committee, Lancashire.
- The Reverend Canon John Stanley Purvis. For services to historical research in York.
- Alan Ramsay, Editor, The Farmer & Stockbreeder.
- Frank Cecil Ransley, DFC, Governor, HM Prison Wandsworth.
- Margaret Colquhoun-Reade, Member of the East Suffolk County Council.
- Ida Barbara Helen Renton, Matron, Edinburgh Royal Infirmary.
- Arthur Richardson, Waterguard Superintendent, Board of Customs & Excise.
- Brigadier Alan MacDougall Ritchie, DSO, Assistant Commissioner-in-Chief, St. John Ambulance Brigade.
- Christopher Julian Ritchie, Director, Fellowships Department, British Council.
- Tom Roberts, Principal, Technical College and Secondary Technical School, Ammanford, Carmarthenshire.
- William Leonard Robinson, Principal Officer, Ministry of Commerce, Northern Ireland.
- Alderman Fred Rogers, JP, Horticulturist, Cornwall.
- Percy Rowbotham, Principal Inspector, Inspectorate of Armaments, Ministry of Supply.
- Reginald William Rule, JP, Chairman, Kent & Canterbury Executive Council, National Health Service.
- Harry Samuels, Standing Counsel, Industrial Welfare Society.
- Arthur Stanley Hope Saville, Principal, Board of Customs & Excise.
- Stanley Stockbridge Scott, Chief Personnel Officer, Central Electricity Generating Board.
- Sydney Herbert Shaw, Senior Principal Scientific Officer, Colonial Office.
- Lieutenant-Colonel John Graham Shillington, DSO, Secretary, Territorial & Auxiliary Forces Association, Counties of Antrim and the City of Belfast.
- Stephen Patrick Simcocks, Deputy Chief Quantity Surveyor, Air Ministry.
- Lancelot Martin Simpson, Chief Engineer and Manager, Telegraph Division, Automatic Telephone & Electric Co. Ltd., Liverpool.
- Bertram Talbot Slinn. For political services.
- Flora Gwendoline Smith. For political and public services in Westmorland.
- Arundel Keith Stanley, Senior Surveyor of Lands, Admiralty.
- Charles Arthur Stansbury, Chief Public Health Inspector, Walsall, Staffordshire.
- Arthur Erskine Storie, Finance Officer, Scotland, Ministry of Labour & National Service.
- Charles Granville Stott, Superintending Valuer, Board of Inland Revenue.
- James Sumner, Public Cleansing and Salvage Inspector, Ministry of Housing & Local Government.
- John Sutherland. For political services in the West of Scotland.
- Edwin Swale, DFC, Alderman, Chesterfield Borough Council.
- Lieutenant-Colonel James Wingate Taylor, TD, Assistant to the Director of Studies, Royal Military Academy Sandhurst.
- Thomas William Terry, Commercial Manager, British Egg Marketing Board.
- George Thompson, Assistant Director (Programmes) Air, Ministry of Supply.
- Eric Gardner Thorp, Borough Engineer and Surveyor, Slough.
- James Robert Tilley. For public services in Northumberland.
- Harold Arthur Tunstall, Assistant Research Manager, W. T. Henley's Telegraph Works Co. Ltd.
- Moses Idwal Valentine, MM, Assistant Chief Constable, Manchester City Police.
- Frederick William Waddell, Chief Engineer, Department of Agriculture for Scotland.
- The Reverend John Walters Waterhouse, Principal, National Children's Home, Highbury Park, London.
- Annie Denholm Watson, Chief Executive Officer, Department of Health for Scotland.
- Daniel Stewart Watson, Senior Principal Scientific Officer, Admiralty Signal and Radar Establishment.
- Clarence Hammond Webster, Chief Engineer, Royal Ordnance Factory, Pembrey, Ministry of Supply.
- Captain John Armstrong White, Master, MS City of Durban, Ellerman & Bucknall Steamship Co. Ltd.
- Wilfrid Harry White. For services to show jumping.
- Herbert Alexander Whitson, Grade 2 Officer, Ministry of Labour & National Service.
- Edward Christie Wellatts, Senior Research Officer, Ministry of Housing & Local Government.
- Alwyn Willoughby Williams, Chief Technical Officer, Rural Industries Bureau.
- Arthur William Woodbridge, Signal Engineer, Western Region, British Railways.
- Humphrey Brooke Worthington, Chief Administrative Officer, Public Trustee Office.
- Richard Ponsonby Maxwell Wright, Engineering Manager, Harland & Wolff Ltd., Belfast.
- Frederick George Young, Head Postmaster, Sheffield.
- George Cholerton Bowker, MBE, British Vice-Consul, Bône.
- Raymond Thomas Butlin, British Council Representative in Finland.
- James Semple Caldwell, British subject resident in Belgium.
- Major (Honorary Lieutenant-Colonel) Alexander Tancred Curle, DSO, MBE, lately Her Majesty's Consul, Addis Ababa and Jibuti.
- Elizabeth Mary Dumbbell, Second Secretary, Her Majesty's Embassy, Tel Aviv.
- Ernest Wightman Ginner, Physician to the Sunny Bank Hospital, Cannes.
- William Frank Gosling, British subject resident in the Lebanon.
- William Ewart Hamley, lately Her Majesty's Consul, Trondheim.
- Harry Taylor Lawrence, MBE, British Council Representative in Burma.
- Laurence Percy Farrer L'Estrange, First Secretary (Commercial), Her Majesty's Embassy, Manila.
- Lily Margaret O'Hanlon, MRCS, LRCP, Head of Pokhara Mission Hospital, Nepal.
- Arthur Crofton Sleigh, Vice-Director, British Institute, Florence.
- Harold Victor Walter, British Vice Consul, Belo Horizonte.
- Eric Blake Wild, MB, FRCS(Ed), Doctor-in-charge of Church Missionary Hospital, Isfahan.
- George Cecil Wood, lately Academic Secretary, University of Khartoum.
- William Murray Wylie, First Secretary (Labour), Her Majesty's Embassy, Buenos Aires.
- Stuart Angus, Deputy Secretary to the Treasury, Federation of Malaya.
- Edward Caradoc Ashton, a Constructing Architect, of Adelaide, in the State of South Australia.
- Frederick Sidney Caley, Director of Social Welfare, Southern Rhodesia.
- John Naylor Parne, a member of the United Kingdom community in the Rawalpindi area, Pakistan.
- Samuel George Carter, lately Official Secretary, Agent-General's Office for the State of Victoria in London.
- Claude Stanislaus Coogan, of Unley, State of South Australia. For social welfare and municipal services.
- Fred Cooksey, President of the Lomagundi Show Society, Southern Rhodesia.
- Percy Gordon Deedes, Chairman of the Natural Resources Board, Southern Rhodesia.
- James Durham Dundas, Chairman of the Victoria League in Scotland.
- Dorothy Edna Annie Edwards, JP, formerly Mayoress of the City of Launceston, State of Tasmania.
- Archibald Clyde Wanliss Fisken, MC, a Councilor of the Shire of Buninyong in the State of Victoria for many years.
- Elizabeth Grace Fogarty, Senior Vice President of the Royal Children's Hospital, Melbourne, State of Victoria.
- Kenneth Rowe Gard. For services to the sugar industry in the State of Queensland.
- George Samuel Gordon, a cerealist employed at the Research Farm, Werribee, State of Victoria.
- Jessie Mary Grace Groom, Mayoress of the City of Brisbane, State of Queensland.
- Carel Jacobus van Heerden, Director of Land Utilization, Swaziland.
- Mark Howarth. For services to cultural movements in the City of Newcastle, State of New South Wales.
- Jack Kenneth Hulme, lately Customs Adviser to the Government of Pakistan.
- Glyn Gardner-Lewis, a member of the United Kingdom community in Bombay, India.
- Vivienne Mackay. For services to the Red Cross in the State of Victoria.
- Stanley Augustine McDonnell, MS (Sydney). For services to the community in the Balonne area, State of Queensland.
- James McKay, General Manager of the Berri Co-operative Packing Union, State of South Australia.
- Richard Owen Deane Noone, Acting Director of Museums and Adviser on Aborigines, Federation of Malaya.
- Patrick Henry O'Flynn, a Senior Assistant Commissioner of Police in the Federation of Malaya, at present Chief Police Officer, Penang.
- William Edmund Colborne Pitcher, Director of Education, Swaziland.
- Norman Bruce Rutherford, District Officer, Bechuanaland Protectorate.
- Edward Charles Henry Schinckel, an agriculturalist and sheep breeder of Kybybolite in the South East, State of South Australia.
- Errol Bayliss Serisier, Chairman of the Macquarie County Council, State of New South Wales.
- Vernon Sitanley Shephard, Town Clerk of the City of West Torrens, State of South Australia.
- Stanley Morton Siddall, Architect-in-Chief to the Government of the State of South Australia.
- Quentin Shaddock Spedding. For services to Journalism in the State of New South Wales.
- Richard Macdonald Vipan, a member of the United Kingdom community in Assam, India.
- Robert Wheaton. For services to the community on Kangaroo Island, State of South Australia.
- Sultan Ahmed bin Abdullah, Fadhli Naib, Western Aden Protectorate.
- Lieutenant-Commander Philip Lionel Salisbury Baxendale, Royal Navy Reserve (Retd.), Port Officer, Aden Port Trust.
- Charles William Baxter, MBE, Town Clerk, Dar-es-Salaam, Tanganyika.
- Chief William Hamilton Biney. For public services in the Federation of Nigeria.
- Major Walter Lewis Bonello, MVO, Aide-de-Camp to the Governor and Commander-in-chief, Malta.
- Edgar Brain, Government Printer, Eastern Region, Nigeria.
- Charles Harold Bushell, Assistant Director, Central Office, Overseas Audit Service.
- George William Eric Cooper. For public services in British Guiana.
- Ernest de Coulhac-Mazerieux. For public services in Seychelles.
- Donald Nicolson Fergusson, Government Printer, Federation of Nigeria.
- James Andrew Charles Florence. For public services in Nyasaland.
- Fung Ping Fan, JP For public services in Hong Kong.
- Emerson Strathmore Gittens, Assistant Administrator, St. Lucia, Windward Islands.
- Henry Martin Godet. Lately Senior Magistrate, Bermuda.
- William James Gorman, BEM, Chief Officer, Hong Kong Fire Brigade.
- Eric George Grell. For public services in Trinidad.
- John Ralph Gordon Hadland, Assistant Director of Agriculture (Cocoa), Western Region, Nigeria.
- Neil Patrick Hadow, Commissioner, Uganda Police Force.
- Stanley Frank Hann, Director of Education, Zanzibar.
- Peter John Harley, Deputy Commissioner, Nigeria Police Force.
- David Heppell Hughes, Administrator General and Official Receiver, Uganda.
- Amir Ja'bil bin Hussein, MBE, Audhal in aib, Western Aden Protectorate.
- Theo Simpson Jones, Deputy Director of Agriculture, Sierra Leone.
- Harry Ernest King, Scientific Officer, Empire Cotton Growing Corporation, Northern Region, Nigeria.
- Walter James Lardner, Stores Superintendent, East African Railways and Harbours Administration.
- Geoffrey Charles Lawrence, Financial Secretary, Somaliland.
- Norman Colombo Angelo Levy, Chairman, Marketing Board, Northern Region, Nigeria.
- The Reverend John Michael Lewars. For services to education in the Eastern Region, Nigeria.
- Ernest Gordon Lewis, MBE, Commissioner, Turks & Caicos Islands, Jamaica.
- Arthur Dignan Leys, JP For public services in Fiji.
- Frank Bradshaw Loney. For public services in Nyasaland.
- John Alexander Malin, MBE, Town Clerk, Gibraltar City Council.
- Chief Thomas Lenana Mlange Marealle. For public services in Tanganyika.
- Horace Reginald Monday, Accountant General, Gambia.
- Orang Kaya Kaya Datu Mustapha bin Datu Harun, Native Chief Grade I, Kudat District, North Borneo.
- Thomas Gates, MBE, Financial Secretary, British Honduras.
- Udo Udo Okure, Member, Public Service Commission, Eastern Region, Nigeria.
- Peter Ratcliffe, Director of Broadcasting, Sarawak.
- Charles Granston Richards, Director, East African Literature Bureau.
- John Edmund Richardson, Superintendent of Crown Lands & Surveys, Hong Kong.
- Charles Garrett Rickett, JP. For public services in Northern Rhodesia.
- Emilienne Rochecouste. For public services in Mauritius.
- Thomas Newland Rosser, DFC, Administrative Officer, Western Region, Nigeria.
- Henry George Savage, Head ofEngineering Stores Department, Office of the Crown Agents for Oversea Governments and Administrations.
- George Sawa Savvides, MBE, Commissioner, Larnaca, Cyprus.
- Wilfred Tom Smith. For services to education in the Eastern Region, Nigeria.
- Noel Richard Solly. For public services in Kenya.
- Robert Merrick Lloyd-Still, MRCS, LRCP, Medical Superintendent, Mental Hospital, Barbados.
- Albert Lewis Bradstow Swaine, ED. For public services in Singapore.
- The Venerable Herbert Reginald Sydenham. For public services in Tanganyika.
- Jack Francis Symons, Deputy Administrative Secretary, Cyprus.
- Aubrey Gordon Denton-Thompson, MC, Colonial Secretary, Falkland Islands.
- Harrison Russell Thompson, Government Architect, Ministry of Works, Kenya.
- Lieutenant-Colonel Harold Frederick Tunaley. For public services in Northern Rhodesia.
- Douglas James Verity. For public services in Jamaica.
- Ronald Alan Wright, Chief Veterinary Officer, Singapore.
- Leonard William Whymark, Assistant Chief Constable, Cyprus Police Force.

==== Member of the Order of the British Empire (MBE) ====
Military Division

Royal Navy

- Acting Commander Stanley Branson Brown, Fiji Royal Naval Volunteer Reserve.
- Lieutenant-Commander Hugh Donald Butler Chambers, Royal Naval Volunteer Reserve.
- Lieutenant-Commander (SD) John Gumming.
- Lieutenant-Commander Anthony Edward Fanning, DSC.
- Lieutenant Brian Hall.
- Lieutenant-Commander Ernest Redver Head.
- Wardmaster Lieutenant-Commander David Charles Jenkins.
- Captain Kenneth Alexander McLean, Royal Marines.
- Acting Second Officer Dorothy Margaret Noakes, Women's Royal Naval Service.
- Lieutenant-Commander Lawrence Andrew Rogers.
- Lieutenant-Commander Andrew Malcolm Seymour, DSC.
- Supply Lieutenant-Commander George Slaney.
- Electrical Lieutenant Charles Cecil Wager.

Army

- Major Robert Tudor Andrew (153467), Royal Army Service Corps.
- Major Gerald Patrick Robert Anslow (132415), Royal Corps of Signals.
- Bimbashi Al Awal (acting) Nasir Buraik Aulaqi (2449), Aden Protectorate Levies.
- Major Arthur Axford (258705), The Manchester Regiment, Territorial Army.
- Major Morton Francis James Barnes (210255), Corps of Royal Engineers.
- 2610848 Warrant Officer Class I John Samuel Bird, Grenadier Guards.
- Major Norman Booker (133705), Royal Army Medical Corps.
- Major (Electrical Mechanical Assistant Engineer) Arthur Carl Brown (218911), Corps of Royal Electrical & Mechanical Engineers.
- 7595171 Warrant Officer Class I John Reginald Brown, Corps of Royal Electrical & Mechanical Engineers
- Major James Stuart Campbell (124873), The Argyll and Sutherland Highlanders (Princess Louise's).
- 21184246 Warrant Officer Class II Reginald John Card, The King's Shropshire Light Infantry, Territorial Army.
- 3774756 Warrant Officer Class II James Carr, Corps of Royal Engineers.
- Major Bernard Bolitho Coaxes, TD (62053), Corps of Royal Military Police, Territorial Army.
- Major Charles Frederick Cole (164379), The Queen's Royal Regiment (West Surrey).
- 5250028 Warrant Officer Class I Edward Charles William Compton, The Worcestershire Regiment.
- 834376 Warrant Officer Class II John Eric Cox, Royal Regiment of Artillery, Territorial Army.
- S/61761 Warrant Officer Class I Ernest Claude Crane, Royal Army Service Corps.
- Major George Crane (167657), Royal Regiment of Artillery, Territorial Army.
- 22221812 Warrant Officer Class I (Bandmaster) William Alexander Crighton, Honourable Artillery Company (Infantry Battalion), Territorial Army.
- Captain (Quartermaster) Richard Albert Crotty (422388), Royal Regiment of Artillery.
- 22259136 Warrant Officer Class I (Bandmaster) Harold Victor Cryer, The Royal Norfolk Regiment, Territorial Army.
- 7262951 Warrant Officer Class I David John Davies, Royal Army Medical Corps.
- Major Clifford Roland Dewdney (138107), The Worcestershire Regiment.
- 19086014 Warrant Officer Class II Robert Alan Dickenson, Royal Army Ordnance Corps.
- Captain (Quartermaster) William James Emerton (415033), 4th/7th Royal Dragoon Guards, Royal Armoured Corps.
- 1871057 Warrant Officer Class I William Anthony Evans, Royal Army Pay Corps.
- 1872181 Warrant Officer Class I Albert Everitt, Corps of Royal Engineers.
- Major Robert Cyril Ford (284433), 4th/7th Royal Dragoon Guards, Royal Armoured Corps.
- 878345 Warrant Officer Class I John Daniel Frederick Gannon, Royal Regiment of Artillery.
- Major (acting) James Geddes, TD (37614), Army Cadet Force.
- Major (Quartermaster) Ernest Andrew Victor Goldsmith (230471), Royal Regiment of Artillery.
- Major William Shanks Grieve, ERD (89286), Royal Corps of Signals, Territorial Army.
- 22282621 Warrant Officer Class II William Hanson, Corps of Royal Engineers, Territorial Army.
- Major (acting) Godfrey Claude William Harland, MC, TD (126972), Combined Cadet Force.
- 4447852 Warrant Officer Class II William Herbert Harper, The Durham Light Infantry, Territorial Army.
- Major (Quartermaster) Patrick Henderson (231497), Corps of Royal Engineers.
- Major Anthony Heritage Farrar-Hockley, DSO, MC (251309), The Gloucestershire Regiment.
- 847106 Warrant Officer Class II (Trumpet Major) Arthur James Hunt, Royal Regiment of Artillery.
- 407710 Warrant Officer Class I Edward John James, 4th Queen's Own Hussars, Royal Armoured Corps.
- Major (Ordnance Executive Officer) Leonard Charles Jiggens (143387), Royal Army Ordnance Corps (now retired).
- Major Charles Maurice Henry Karslake, TD (140842), Royal Regiment of Artillery, Territorial Army.
- Captain (Quartermaster) Joseph Keenan (433466), The Royal Irish Fusiliers (Princess Victoria's).
- Major (acting) William Alfred Kitson (272508), Combined Cadet Force.
- 318319 3 Warrant Officer Class II Archibald Ballingall Lawson, The King's Own Scottish Borderers, Territorial Army.
- Major Michael Roland Leahy, MC (117522), Royal Regiment of Artillery.
- 882591 Warrant Officer Class I Thomas Edward Lockyer, Royal Regiment of Artillery.
- Major Thomas Macguire (409857), Royal Army Ordnance Corps, Territorial Army.
- Major (acting) John Collingwood Manisty, TD (63381), Combined Cadet Force.
- 21015204 Warrant Officer Class II Albert Maynard, The Parachute Regiment, Territorial Army.
- 3243721 Warrant Officer Class II Hugh McIntosh, The Cameronians (Scottish Rifles).
- Major Alma May Metcher (266178), Women's Royal Army Corps.
- S/14512102 Warrant Officer Class I (acting) Frederick Edwin Walter Minchington, Royal Army Service Corps.
- Major Thomas Ellis Morgan (85565), Corps of Royal Engineers.
- Major Clifford Charles Foster Naylor (168690), Royal Army Ordnance Corps.
- 22086588 Warrant Officer Class II Peter Alan Padwick, Royal Army Educational Corps.
- Major John Richard Cecil Pitcairn (88268), Royal Regiment of Artillery.
- Major William Frederick Pollard (230189), The Royal Hampshire Regiment.
- Captain (acting) Henry Preston (183926), Army Cadet Force.
- Major (Quartermaster) Harry Ernest Quibell (234804), Corps of Royal Electrical & Mechanical Engineers.
- Captain Mairi Katherine Reid (305480), Women's Royal Army Corps, Territorial Army.
- Major (now Lieutenant-Colonel (temporary)) Frederick Pett-Ridge (212198), Royal Regiment of Artillery.
- 6137140 Warrant Officer Class I Frederick William Roy, 15th/19th The King's Royal Hussars, Royal Armoured Corps.
- Major (Quantity Surveyor) William George Beverley Shaw (47410), Corps of Royal Engineers.
- 4975275 Warrant Officer Class I William Silcock, Small Arms School Corps.
- Captain Gertrude Elizabeth Simmonds (386459), Women's Royal Army Corps.
- Major Norman Clive Smith (187800), The Essex Regiment (now RARO).
- 2656975 Warrant Officer Class I Charles Lacey Smy, DCM, Coldstream Guards.
- 2612315 Warrant Officer Class II Robert Alfred Spick, Corps of Royal Military Police.
- Major John Douglas Beauchamp Thornton (268261), Royal Corps of Signals.
- Major Alan Rex Waller, MC (89986), The Middlesex Regiment (Duke of Cambridge's Own).
- Captain Leslie Harold Warth (417488), Royal Regiment of Artillery, Territorial Army.
- 2718480 Warrant Officer Class I William Rankin Watton, The Royal Hampshire Regiment.
- Captain William Tucker White, TD (97124), The Devonshire Regiment, Territorial Army.
- Major Francis Cyril Withers (171289), Royal Pioneer Corps.
- Major William Joseph Wood (159963), Royal Army Ordnance Corps.
- 6139959 Warrant Officer Class I (Bandmaster) Hilary Vernon Woollaston, The East Surrey Regiment; seconded to The King's African Rifles.
- Major (Temporary) Desmond Alfred Barker-Wyatt (290897), Corps of Royal Engineers.
- Major George William Kelly, Johore Home Guard, Federation of Malaya.
- 5567323 Warrant Officer Class I (acting) Charles Levis, Army Physical Training Corps; formerly on loan to the Government of Pakistan.
- Major James Alexander Sangster, Officer Commanding, Main Ordnance Depot, Fiji Military Forces.
- Captain Joffre Harold Charles Serrette, Garrison Quartermaster, Trinidad Military Forces.

Royal Air Force

- Squadron Leader Keith Gerald Bradbury (199879), RAF Regiment.
- Squadron Leader Alexander Denovan, DFM (51835).
- Squadron Leader Ronald Frank Hitchcock, AFC (52019).
- Squadron Leader Eric George Holmes (138623).
- Squadron Leader Abraham Sacks (59363).
- Squadron Leader Charles John Williamson Soutar, MB, BS (202612).
- Squadron Leader James William Whitelegg (57455).
- Acting Squadron Leader Luther Hopkins (550462).
- Acting Squadron Leader Cyril Benjamin Kenworthy, DFC (160607), (Ret'd).
- Acting Squadron Leader Ronald George Proctor (180636).
- Acting Squadron Leader Frederick Charles Henry Simmonds (65733), Royal Air Force Volunteer Reserve (Training Branch).
- Acting Squadron Leader Arthur Frederick Smith (102854), Royal Air Force Volunteer Reserve (Training Branch).
- Flight Lieutenant Kenneth Blashill (134779), Royal Auxiliary Air Force.
- Flight Lieutenant Colin Foote Campbell (152312), Royal Auxiliary Air Force.
- Flight Lieutenant Stanley George Coulson (366248).
- Flight Lieutenant Ralph Harry Gould (122077).
- Flight Lieutenant Harold Trevor Greenwood, DFC (158409).
- Flight Lieutenant Albert Edward Grover (46853).
- Flight Lieutenant William Hector Allenby Jones (51792).
- Flight Lieutenant James Mayhew (514513).
- Flight Lieutenant Frank Pendlebury (575071).
- Flight Lieutenant Thomas Anthony Phillipson (200627).
- Flight Lieutenant Frank Priestley (517226).
- Flight Lieutenant Vincent Josiah Rees (500821).
- Flight Lieutenant James Eric Walton (579020).
- Acting Flight Lieutenant Wilfred Atkinson (68481), Royal Air Force Volunteer Reserve (Training Branch).
- Flying Officer Francis Sykes (525399).
- Warrant Officer Arthur Atkin (610443).
- Warrant Officer Leonard Robert Blake (516019).
- Warrant Officer William Alfred Blewett (620107).
- Warrant Officer Frederic Gordon Booth (349854).
- Warrant Officer William Lambert Bullock (518161).
- Warrant Officer Charles Frederick Burr (521380).
- Warrant Officer Thomas Gwynne Evans (536905), RAF Regiment.
- Warrant Officer Stuart Hutton Ferguson (563869).
- Warrant Officer John Oswald Gowland (545323).
- Warrant Officer William Andrew Kemp (545419).
- Warrant-Officer Geoffrey Stewart Laing (561777).
- Warrant Officer Stanley Arthur Lucas (563855).
- Warrant Officer Gordon Henderson Murray (518682).
- Warrant Officer George Henry Lot Parker (526647).
- Warrant Officer Leslie Riddell (515595).
- Warrant Officer Hugh Riley (518005).
- Warrant Officer John Tristram Rogers (530778).
- Warrant Officer Robert William. Taylor (517398).

Civil Division

- Edith Doris Abraham. For services to the Brentwood Recuperative Centre, Marple, Cheshire.
- William Mackie Adams, Higher Executive Officer, Government Communications Headquarters.
- Cyril Arthur Allen, Senior Collector, Board of Inland Revenue.
- Hector Augustus Allen, Senior Executive Officer, Ministry of Pensions & National Insurance.
- Alfred Baynham Archer, Higher Executive Officer, Royal Observer Corps, Air Ministry.
- Ethel Archer, Higher Executive Officer, Board of Customs & Excise.
- John Robert Arnold, Chairman, Grantham, Boston & District War Pensions Committee.
- Alexander Auchterlonie. For services to Forestry.
- Edward Cecil Avery, lately Power Station Superintendent, Littlebrook Power Station, Central Electricity Generating Board, South Eastern Division.
- Charles Baines. For services as Chairman, Gainsborough Urban District Council.
- Arthur Collin Baker, District Engineer, Ministry of Works.
- Herbert Robert Barber. For political services in Paddington.
- Henry George Barker, Secretary and Cashier, Royal Greenwich Observatory.
- Charles Henry Barron, Superintendent, Bedfordshire Constabulary.
- William James Barrow, Foreman of Electrical Branch, HM Dockyard, Portsmouth.
- George Frederick Batchelor. For political services in East Hertfordshire.
- William Stewart Baxter, Executive Engineer, Post Office Telephones, Inverness.
- Marjorie Bell, Matron, Lewisham Hospital, London.
- Arthur Bennett, Contracts Manager, Wm. Eaves & Co. Ltd., Blackpool, Lancashire.
- Edward Walsham Berry, Lately Chief Warden, Civil Defence Corps, Doncaster.
- Hubert Henry Birch, Headmaster, Westgate County Primary School, Otley, Yorkshire.
- Edith Marie Bird, Higher Executive Officer, Ministry of Pensions & National Insurance.
- Richard Blacker, Senior Executive Officer, Ministry of Pensions & National Insurance.
- Charles Russell Blackwood, Senior Executive Officer, Ministry of Pensions & National Insurance.
- Kathleen Mary Boote, Clerical Officer, Home Office.
- Agnes Isabella Borland, Head Teacher, Gavieside Primary School, Midlothian.
- Bertie Bourton. For political services in Wales and Monmouthshire.
- James Patrick Bradley, MM, Higher Executive Officer, Ministry of Pensions & National Insurance.
- Hugh Allan Brooke, Engineer I, Atomic Weapons Research Establishment, Aldermaston, United Kingdom Atomic Energy Authority.
- Frank Thorp Brookes, General Manager, Tottenham Division, Eastern Gas Board.
- William George Brown, Executive Officer, Foreign Office.
- John David Browning, Chairman of Committee, Nos. 66, 97 & 1924 (Croydon) Squadrons, Air Training Corps.
- Gilbert Elliot Ernest Buchner, Chief Engineer, Witham Fourth District Internal Drainage Board.
- Robert Burnett, Clerk of Works (Grade I), Department of Agriculture for Scotland.
- Cecil Edward Butler, Higher Executive Officer, Ministry of Transport & Civil Aviation.
- Vera Kathleen Gale. For political and public services in Southampton.
- Percy Richard Cartwright, Head Clerk, Town Clerk's Office, Birmingham.
- William Edward Cavill, JP, Chairman, West Cornwall (Truro) Youth Employment Committee.
- Irene Bertha Chad, Higher Executive Officer, Commonwealth Relations Office.
- George William Chapman, Division Manager, Hudswell, Clarke & Co. Ltd.
- Alice Cockcroft. For political and public services in Halifax.
- Cyril Josiah Cooper, Headmaster, Risley Hall Approved School, near Derby.
- Henry Alfred Cordery, Higher Executive Officer, Cabinet Office.
- Percy Ernest Cornish, Scene Master, Television Service, British Broadcasting Corporation.
- Leslie Harry Corry, Youth Organiser for London County Council in St. Marylebone, Paddington and Hampstead.
- Thomas Cotgrave, Deputy Manager, Manchester Employment Exchange, Ministry of Labour & National Service.
- George Montague Cox, MC, AFC, lately Assistant Airport Manager, Prestwick Airport, Ministry of Transport & Civil Aviation.
- John Craig. For services to youth in Bangor, County Down.
- Matthew Joseph Crehan, Inspector of Taxes, Board of Inland Revenue.
- Thomas Crozier, District Inspector, Royal Ulster Constabulary.
- Thomas Jackson Curry, Assistant Grade Ii, Agricultural Land Service, Ministry of Agriculture, Fisheries & Food.
- James Darragh, Head of Electrical Stores Department, Harland & Wolff Ltd., Belfast.
- Denis Davey, lately Executive Officer, War Office.
- Constance Elizabeth David. For political and public services in Carmarthenshire.
- Alderman Henry Charles Day, Chief Warden, Civil Defence Corps, Chesterfield.
- William George De Boo, Chief Mechanical Engineer, Cathodeon Electronic Ltd., Southend-on-Sea.
- Catherine Denholm. For political and public services in Glasgow.
- Edith May Dickenson, Deputy Headmistress, Robin Hood Infants' School, Mansfield, Nottinghamshire.
- Nora Grace Dillon. For political and public services in County Durham.
- Harold Dix, Superintendent, Staffordshire Constabulary.
- Joan Kathleen Dobbs, President, Young Farmers' Clubs of Ulster.
- Cyril Fulford Dobson, Senior Executive Officer (now Chief Executive Officer), War Office.
- Arthur Edward Dodd, Chief Information Officer, British Ceramic Research Association.
- Isobel Donnelly, Hospital Nursing Officer, Yorkshire, Nottingham & East Anglian Regions, Ministry of Health.
- Annie Evelyn Dorrian, Registrar of Births & Deaths, Tynemouth.
- Mary Louisa Dougan. For political and public services in County Armagh.
- Mary Caroline Douglass, Executive Officer, Office of the Lord President of the Council.
- Archibald Stanley Downes, Manager, Government Training Centre, Birmingham, Ministry of Labour & National Service.
- Joseph Kirby Drake, Honorary Secretary, Cheshunt Savings Committee, Hertfordshire.
- Constance Margaret Drewett, Executive Officer, Ministry of Housing & Local Government.
- William Bruce Duncan, Higher Executive Officer, General Post Office.
- Isobel Violet Skelton Dunlop. For services to Music in Scotland.
- Robert Dwen, Staff Officer, Ministry of Health & Local Government, Northern Ireland.
- Walter Joseph Dymott. For political services in Spelthorne.
- Arthur Easton, Chief Officer, Huntingdonshire Fire Brigade.
- Wilfred Harold Eastwell, Senior Executive Officer, Ministry of Agriculture, Fisheries & Food.
- Alfred John Edney, Higher Executive Officer, Ministry of Agriculture, Fisheries & Food.
- Arthur James Edwards. Lately Executive Officer, Board of Trade.
- Alfred Lewis Ellsworth. For charitable services in Glasgow and District.
- Gwen Evans, Higher Executive Officer, Ministry of Pensions & National Insurance.
- Frank Fancutt, Assistant Director, Chemical Services, Research Department, British Railways Central Staff.
- William Edward Faragher, Town Clerk, Ramsey, Isle of Man.
- Reginald-Peter Fenwick, Intelligence Officer, Grade I, War Office.
- Charles Donald Ferguson, MB, ChB, JP. For political and public services in Ross and Cromarty.
- Elizabeth Margaret Ferguson, Administrative Assistant, Secretariat, British Broadcasting Corporation.
- Edwin Charles Ferris, Estate and Works Engineer, General Electric Co. Ltd., Birmingham.
- Xenia Noelle Field, JP. For services to the Prison Commission.
- Harry Finch, Signals Officer, Ministry of Transport & Civil Aviation.
- Archibald Pollock Black Findlay, Leading Ship Draughtsman, Yarrow & Co. Ltd., Glasgow.
- Mary Fisher, JP, Alderman, Harrogate Borough Council.
- George Arthur Fleet, Personal Assistant to the President of the British Legion.
- William Fleming, General Manager, James Martin & Son, Edinburgh.
- Harold Alfred Foot, Inspector of Taxes, Board of Inland Revenue.
- Charles James Frethey, lately Principal Assistant, Stores and Accommodation, London Fire Brigade.
- Harry Evelyn Gibbs, Senior Executive Officer, Ministry of Housing & Local Government.
- Albert Ralph Gilson, Building Consultant. For services to the University of Cambridge.
- Eleanor Godson, Health Visitor, Shrewsbury, Shropshire County Council.
- Richard Herbert Lindsay Goffin, Director, Book Exhibitions Department, British Council.
- Frederick William Gowar, Honorary Secretary, Potters Bar Local Savings Committee, Middlesex.
- Robin Gray, Chief Designer, Chloride Batteries Ltd., Exide Works, near Manchester.
- Edith May Green, Executive Officer, Ministry of Education.
- John Green, Traffic Manager, North Western Road Car Co. Ltd.
- William Green, Chief Chemist, Manvers Rectification Plant, North Eastern Division, National Coal Board.
- William Matthew Grier, Burgh Chamberlain, Alloa, Clackmannanshire.
- Herbert Victor Griffiths, Engineer-in Charge, Tatsfield Receiving Station, British Broadcasting Corporation.
- Emily Elizabeth Grinsted. Lately Executive Officer, Royal Aircraft Establishment, Farnborough, Ministry of Supply.
- Daniel Grudgings, Clerk, Benfleet Urban District Council.
- George John Rushton Guidon, Senior Executive Officer, Board of Trade.
- Marie Louise Middlebrook-Haigh. For public services in Huddersfield.
- Laura Hampson, Ward Sister, Stanley Royd (Mental) Hospital, Wakefield.
- Alfred Hanson, Divisional Secretary, Amalgamated Union of Building Trade Workers.
- Robert William Hanwell, Senior Executive Officer, No.35 Maintenance Unit, Royal Air Force, Heywood, Lancashire.
- Shiela Harbottle, Administrative Assistant, Admiralty.
- Cecil Jamieson Harvey, JP. For political and public services in Bexley.
- Joseph Meskell Harvey. For political services in the Wirral.
- Philip Samuel Haskell. For political services in Wessex.
- Edgar Michael Haskins, Records Officer, North-West European Region, Imperial War Graves Commission.
- Isabel Eugenie Hasluck, Centre Organiser, Women's Voluntary Services, British Army of the Rhine.
- Beatrice Scott Wilkie Hay. For political services in Perthshire.
- Albert Edward Head, JP, General Secretary, Chain Makers' and Strikers' Association.
- George Leslie Head, Civil Defence Officer, Birmingham.
- Arthur Hearn, Senior Executive Officer, Ministry of Agriculture, Fisheries & Food.
- Kathleen Bell Henderson, Higher Executive Officer, Ministry of Pensions & National Insurance.
- William George Henderson, Staff Officer, Ministry of Labour & National Insurance, Northern Ireland.
- Granville Dronfield Hewitt, JP. For political and public services in Stockton-on Tees.
- Harold Heynes, Senior Executive Officer, Air Ministry.
- Alice Elizabeth Hicks. For services to the Royal Salop Infirmary, Shrewsbury.
- Edward Arthur William Hill, DSM, Grade 3 Officer, Ministry of Labour & National Service.
- Thomas Frederick Hill, Assistant Works Manager, Fluidrive Engineering Co. Ltd., Isleworth, Middlesex.
- Thomas William Edwin Hills, Chief Steward and Purser, MS Port Auckland, Port Line Ltd.
- Henry Frederick John Hiscock, lately Sales Representative, Telephone Manager's Office, Cambridge.
- William Henry Hodgetts, Production Manager, Copper Products Group, Imperial Chemical Industries Ltd. (Metals Division).
- Monica Winifred Hodgkinson. For political services in West Derbyshire.
- Captain Charles Stanley Swinnerton Holbrook, Commodore, Bank Line Fleet, Andrew Weir & Co. Ltd.
- Thomas James Holland, Assistant Librarian, Royal United Service Institution.
- Samuel Brown Hooks. For political services in Glasgow.
- Donald Charles Horne, Parliamentary Clerk, Ministry of Labour & National Service.
- Aylmer Victor Dyson Hort, TD, Allowances Officer, British Broadcasting Corporation.
- Robert John Howard, Inspector of Taxes, Board of Inland Revenue.
- Joseph Squire Hoyle, Executive Officer, Mental Health Services Department, Leeds.
- Sarah Jane Huddie, Regional Staff Training and Staff Welfare Officer, Southern Region, Ministry of Labour & National Service.
- Edward Arthur Humphry, Deputy Superintendent, Directorate-General of Works, Air Ministry.
- Charles Norman Hutton, Contractor's Agent, W. E. Chivers & Sons Ltd., Devizes, Wiltshire.
- William Ewart Gladstone Ireland, Higher Executive Officer, Ministry of Pensions & National Insurance.
- Brigadier Manley Angell James, VC, DSO, MC, DL, Civil Defence Officer, Bristol Aeroplane Co. Ltd.
- John Graham Jardine, JP, Chairman, Airdrie Local Employment Committee.
- Elsie May Jefferies, JP For political and public services in Essex.
- Alderman John Henry Johnson. For public services in Kent.
- Robert Hall Johnson, Senior Superintendent, Mercantile Marine Office, Ministry of Transport & Civil Aviation.
- William Knox-Johnston. For political and public services in Berkhamsted.
- Agnes Elizabeth Jones. For public and charitable services in Pentre, Rhondda.
- Captain Bernard Darwin Jones, Chief Clerk, Hereford, Brecknock & Radnor Territorial and Auxiliary Forces Association.
- Cyril Frank Jones, Higher Executive Officer, War Damage Commission & Central Land Board.
- John Jones, Assistant Melting, Shop Manager, Steel Company of Wales Ltd., Port Talbot.
- John Morley Jones, Senior Executive Officer, Ministry of Supply.
- Clifford Joslin, Assistant Manager, Royal Ordnance Factory, Nottingham.
- Charles Edward Jowitt, Senior Experimental Officer, Meteorological Office, Aberporth, Air Ministry.
- William James Kembey, Clerical Officer, Commonwealth Relations Office.
- The Reverend Thomas Phoebus Kerfoot, Superintendent, Headquarters, Missions to Seamen.
- Major James Fairlee Kimm, Supervisory Clerk, Administration, Territorial & Auxiliary Forces Association, Counties of Dumfries, Kirkcudbright and Wigtown.
- Edgar George Kirby, Senior Signals Officer, Ministry of Transport & Civil Aviation.
- Alexander Lauriston, Chairman, National Assistance Appeal Tribunal, Middlesbrough, Stockton-on-Tees and Hartlepool area.
- David Joseph Leahy, Executive Officer, Command Ordnance Depot, Stirling, War Office.
- Captain Archibald John Leckie, Master, MV England, Currie Line Ltd.
- Elsie Leetham Lees, County Borough Organiser, Wolverhampton, Women's Voluntary Services.
- Gladys Mary Lewis, Assistant, Staff Administration, British Broadcasting Corporation.
- Robert Lewis, Superintendent, Machine Shop, Westool Ltd., St. Helens Auckland, County Durham.
- Thomas Lewis, lately Secretary and Executive Officer, Welsh Agricultural Organisation Society Ltd.
- Stanley John Little, Enforcement Officer, HM Treasury.
- Michael Charles Lloyd, Chairman, Wolverhampton & District Advisory Committee, Midland Regional Board for Industry.
- William Ellis Lloyd, lately Assistant County Advisory Officer, Caernarvonshire Agricultural Executive Committee.
- Theresa Ellen Long. For political and public services in Sussex.
- Florence Lord. For political services in Bury and Radcliffe.
- Thomas Caleb Loveday, Area Engineer, East Telephone Area, General Post Office.
- William Low, Executive Officer, Ministry of Transport & Civil Aviation.
- George Edward Lund, Clerical Officer, Royal Naval Barracks, Chatham, Kent.
- Mary Moore Macauley, Secretary to the Speakers of the Senate and House of Commons, Northern Ireland.
- Mary Macbeth, Grade 5 Officer, Branch B of the Foreign Service, Foreign Office.
- Richard Charles McCarthy, Chief Designer, Thames Refinery, Tate & Lyle Ltd.
- James McCauley, Honorary Secretary and Organiser, Imperial Chemical Industries Ltd., Ardeer Works Savings Group, Ayrshire.
- William Brown MacDonald, Chief Engineer, MS Athelknight, Athel Line Ltd.
- Eileen McGuire, Higher Executive Officer, Board of Trade.
- May Jane McKinlay, General Secretary, Girls' Guildry.
- Margaret McLuckie, Executive Officer, Ministry of Works.
- Sidney James McNally, Senior Executive Officer, Commonwealth Relations Office.
- James Middleton McNulty, Secretary, British Felt Hat Manufacturers' Federation.
- Ruth Eileen Maddox, Group Secretary, Mid-Wiltshire Hospital Management Committee.
- George Charles Malcher, Intelligence Officer, Grade II, Ministry of Defence.
- Ida Greville Marsden. For political and public services in Hampstead and Southwark.
- Frederick Marshall, Charge Nurse, Parkside (Mental) Hospital, Macclesfield.
- Ada Masters, Ward Sister, Wingfield Morris Hospital, Nuffield Orthopaedic Centre.
- Leonard Samuel Matthews, Grade 3 Officer, Branch B of the Foreign Service, Foreign Office.
- William Mawhinney, Chairman, Castlereagh Rural District Council, County Down.
- Blanche Elizabeth Meakin, Chairman, Welfare Services Committee and Mental Health Sub-Committee of Health Committee, Stoke-on-Trent City Council.
- Arthur Ernest Miles, Higher Executive Officer, Department of Scientific and Industrial Research.
- Florence Sophia Millard. For political and public services in Cambridgeshire.
- James John Miller, Chief Superintendent, Metropolitan Police.
- Robert William Mills, Higher Executive Officer, Ministry of Transport & Civil Aviation.
- Bernard Loweth Morgan, JP. For political and public services in Epping and Hackney.
- Edith Morison, Clerical Officer, Scottish Education Department.
- Bertie Morrish, Executive Officer, Ministry of Transport & Civil Aviation.
- John Morrison, Chief Male Nurse, State Mental Hospital and State Institution, Carstairs.
- Trevellick Moyle, Honorary Secretary, St. Mary's Station, Scilly Isles, Royal National Lifeboat Institution.
- Gavin Muir, MB, ChB, Member, Medical Board, Newcastle, under the National Service Acts.
- Margaret McKenzie Kerr-Muir, County Borough Organiser, West Hartlepool, Women's Voluntary Services.
- Diana Mumford, Attached War Office.
- Albert Newby, lately Section Leader in charge of Special Assignments, Baker Perkins Ltd., Peterborough.
- Frederick Charles Newman, Principal Surveyor, Tithe Redemption Commission.
- William Nicol, Partner, Craig-Nicol, Glasgow.
- Herbert Brown Noble, Honorary Secretary, Carlisle Rural District Savings Committee.
- Ernest Percival Nottage, Chief Clerk, Territorial & Auxiliary Forces Association, County of Chester.
- Albert George Nunn, Senior Planning Engineer, British Overseas Airways Corporation.
- James Anthony O'Brien, District Inspector, Royal Ulster Constabulary.
- Kenneth Turner O'Brien, Honorary Secretary, Bridlington & District Savings Committee, East Riding of Yorkshire.
- William Michael O'Leary, Chairman, South Middlesex & District War Pensions Committee.
- John Orton, Chairman, Solihull Savings Committee, Warwickshire.
- Stanley Henry Horace Page, Head Postmaster, Leatherhead, Surrey.
- Cicely Louisa Marion Passmore, Treasurer, St. David's Home for Disabled Ex-Servicemen, London.
- Robert Hunter Patterson, Chief Officer, Darlington Fire Brigade.
- William Ernest Peacock, Senior Executive Officer, Ministry of Health.
- James Pearson, Deputy Commissioner, North Riding of Yorkshire, St. John Ambulance Brigade.
- Waldemar Julius Pedersen, Assistant Principal Clerk, Board of Inland Revenue.
- Margaret Penny, lately Vice-Principal, Royal Normal College for the Blind, Rowton Castle, near Shrewsbury.
- George Alexander Perry. Lately Senior Executive Officer, Board of Trade.
- Leslie Cecil Pethers, Senior Museum Assistant, Science Museum.
- Reginald Hayter Clive Phillpott. Lately Higher Executive Officer, Air Ministry.
- Alfred Thomas Philp, Group Scoutmaster, 1st Rhiwibina Group, Glamorgan-shire.
- Lucy Ursula Pickett. For political and public services in Elstree.
- Geoffrey William Pitt, Director, Eagle Aviation Ltd. & Eagle Airways Ltd.
- Hazell George Polley, JP. Lately Member, Brightlingsea Urban District Council, Essex.
- Agnes Sybil Price, County Milk Production Officer, Carmarthen, Ministry of Agriculture, Fisheries & Food.
- William Henry Price, Station Master, Birmingham, London Midland Region, British Railways.
- Hugh Pritchard, Member, Llangefni Urban District Council, Anglesey.
- Muriel Henrietta Reay, Senior English Mistress, Bexley Technical School for Girls, Kent.
- William Henry Redman, First Class Clerk, Central Office, Supreme Court of Judicature.
- Charles Henry Reed, DCM, Chairman, Ilford & Romford War Pensions Committee.
- Reginald Garvie Reekie, Chairman, Guildford Savings Committee.
- Elizabeth Sabina Duggan-Rees, Domestic Bursar, Chelsea College of Physical Education, Eastbourne.
- Bernard Anderson Reid, Honorary Secretary, South Ayrshire Local Savings Committee and South-West Area Savings Committee, Scotland.
- Barbara Joan Rendell, Honorary Secretary, Launceston & Broadwoodwidger Savings Committee, Cornwall.
- Douglas Arthur Rice, Section Officer, Royal Naval Minewatching Service, Portsmouth.
- James Riley, Works Manager, Burnley Aircraft Products Ltd., Burnley, Lancashire.
- Thomas Mortimer Riordan, Assistant Secretary, Territorial & Auxiliary Forces Association, North Riding, County of York.
- Herbert Griffiths Roberts, Senior Technical Superintendent, No.33 Maintenance Unit, Royal Air Force, Lyneham, Wiltshire.
- Lavinia Robertson, Chief Clerk, Territorial & Auxiliary Forces Association, Berkshire.
- Alfred Frank Robinson, Clerical Officer, Commonwealth Relations Office.
- Benjamin Robinson, Chief Officer, Newport Fire Brigade.
- Charles Paul Victor Roche. Lately Airport Commandant, States of Jersey Airport.
- Ailsa Leily Rogers, Organising Secretary, Northern Ireland Central Council, British Red Cross Society.
- Edward Rolph, JP, Chairman, High Wycombe & District Disablement Advisory Committee.
- Norman Albert Victor Romer, Higher Clerical Officer, Board of Customs & Excise.
- Harry Rose, Member, East District Committee, Huntingdonshire & Soke of Peterborough Agricultural Executive Committee.
- Harry Shaw Rowe, formerly Director of Technical Services of the Near East Arab Association Ltd.
- Richard Rowland. Lately Member, Buckinghamshire Agricultural Executive Committee.
- John Cameron Russell, Member, Management Committee, Mayfield House Children's Home, Edinburgh.
- David Martin Sangster, MM, Senior Executive Officer, National Assistance Board.
- Harold Bertram Saunders, Grade 3 Officer, Ministry of Labour & National Service.
- Eric Saxon, Secretary, Holman Michell & Co. Ltd., St. Helens, Lancashire.
- John Irvin Thomas Scallon, Secretary, Vosper Ltd., Portsmouth.
- James Kiltie. Scott, Superintendent and Deputy Chief Constable, Kilmarnock Burgh Police.
- Leslie Francis Selby, Experimental Officer, Chemical Inspectorate, Woolwich, Ministry of Supply.
- Clifford Sellick, Member of the Council of the Rural District Councils Association.
- Alexander Shand, Chief Superintendent (T/Assistant Chief Constable), Nottinghamshire Constabulary.
- Alfred Samuel Shawyer, Divisional Officer, London Fire Brigade.
- Lieutenant-Colonel David Edward Shepherd, Supervisor, Navy, Army & Air Force Institutes, Malta.
- Fred Shooter, District Inspector of Mines and Quarries, East Midlands Division, Ministry of Power.
- Edgar Silvanus Shrimpton, Draughtsman Grade I, Ordnance Survey Department, Southampton, Ministry of Agriculture, Fisheries & Food.
- Sam Shutt, Civil Defence Officer, Bermondsey.
- Rose Eveleen Swaine Simes, Section Secretary, Food Manufacturers' Federation Incorporated.
- Albert Smith, Executive Officer, War Office.
- Christopher Henson Smith, Controller, Welsh Ambulance Committee, Order of St. John and British Red Cross Society.
- Ernest Albert Smith, Senior Executive Officer, Cable & Wireless Ltd., London.
- Ida Phyllis Barclay-Smith. For services to the preservation of bird life.
- Philip Bertrand Smith, Senior Experimental Officer, Safety in Mines Research Establishment, Ministry of Power.
- Mary McGregor Sommervill, Private Secretary to the Manager, Ayrshire, Area, South of Scotland Electricity Board.
- Herbert Austin Spencer. For political services in Cannock.
- Alan Clapham Stanley, Principal, Ashfield Boys' Intermediate School, Belfast.
- Herbert Stanley, Member, Derbyshire Agricultural Executive Committee.
- Mary Ballantyne Stark, Matron, Adamson Hospital, Cupar, Fife.
- Henry Leslie Harvey Stevens, Senior Executive Officer, Export Credits Guarantee Department.
- Eva Margaretta Stevenson, lately Executive Officer, Post Office Headquarters, Northern Ireland.
- Sara Stevenson, Honorary Secretary, Street Savings Group, Ligoniel, Belfast.
- Harold Brown Stewart, Chief Photographer, British European Airways Corporation.
- Major James Stokes, Technical Director, Louis Newmark Ltd.
- William Eric Sutton, Public Relations Officer, Mersey Docks & Harbour Board.
- David Scott Swanston, MM. For services to Agriculture in the North of Scotland.
- Ernest Wallace Sweeting, Senior Accountant, Admiralty.
- Brenda Moncrieff Tandy, Member of the Executive Committee, Officers' Families Fund.
- George Albert William Tarring, Assistant Official Receiver, Board of Trade.
- James Hunter Tate, Honorary Secretary, Helen's Bay and Craigavad Branches, British Legion, County Down.
- David Daniel Thomas, Member, Llandeilo Rural District Council.
- Frank Thompson, Surveyor, Board of Customs & Excise.
- Ruby Patience Thompson, Home Nurse, Middlesex County Council.
- Ruth Nora Kathleen Thompson. Lately Head of the "Homes" Department, Royal National Institute for the Blind.
- Donald Thomson, Inspector of Air Raid Warnings, Scotland.
- Ralph Thurley, Station Superintendent, Belfast, British European Airways Corporation.
- Effie Dawn Tidswell. For services as Nurse, National Dock Labour Board.
- Albert Tipton, JP, Assistant Postmaster, Ludlow, Shropshire.
- Margaret Tolson, Executive Officer, Government Communications Headquarters.
- Hubert Tom Tooby, Chairman, Upton District Committee, Worcestershire Agricultural Executive Committee.
- Cyril Birley Townsend, Clerk, Bedford Rural District Council and Kempston Urban District Council.
- Thomas Henry Turner, Higher Executive Officer, Board of Trade.
- David Valentine, Member of Council and Finance Committee, St Andrew's Ambulance Association.
- Emily Verity, Senior Science Mistress, Withington Girls' High School, Manchester.
- Russell Charles Vernon, Civil Defence Officer, Wandsworth.
- Aileen Mary Vestey, Head of the Empire and Foreign Department, Women's Voluntary Services.
- William Bowes Vickers, lately Superintendent, Durham County Constabulary.
- Edith Lillian Vincent, Deputy Head Teacher, Dorchester County Modern School.
- Annesley Voysey, Publications Officer, National Federation of Young Farmers' Clubs.
- Andrew John Walker, Senior Executive Officer, Charity Commission.
- Gladys Emma Walker, West Country Area Secretary, King George's Fund for Sailors.
- Samuel Alexander Walker, Chairman, Scottish Branch, Institute of Weights & Measures Administration.
- Alfred Wall, Higher Executive Officer, Public Works Loan Board.
- Robert William Ward, Fishery Officer, Yorkshire Ouse River Board.
- Samuel Thomas Warne, Higher Executive Officer, Air Ministry.
- Ernest Willis Waterfield, Assistant Inspector of Naval Ordnance, Admiralty.
- Alison Jean Watt, Private Secretary to the Chairman and Director General, Independent Television Authority.
- Flora Elsie Weddell, Assistant Civil Defence Organiser, Scotland and Food Flying Squads Liaison Officer, Women's Voluntary Services.
- William Ashmore Weller, Senior Executive Officer, Ministry of Supply.
- Ralph Neville Walter Wellings, Civil Defence Controller, Vauxhall Motors Ltd., Luton.
- Royce William Westcombe, JP. For political and public services in Peterborough.
- Roland Westhorp, Chief Engineer, Stevinson, Hardy & Co. Ltd.
- Norma Ada Amelia Weston, Chief Superintendent of Typists, Scrivenery Department, Supreme Court of Judicature.
- Robert Alexander Collis Whinnerah, JP, Vice-Chairman, Thames Estuary District Committee, Eastern Regional Board for Industry.
- Colonel Henry Maurice Whitcombe, Retired Officer Grade II, War Office.
- Gilbert Thomas White, Works Manager, Guided Weapons Division, Sir W. G. Armstrong Whitworth Aircraft Ltd.
- Edwin Whiteley, Clutch Section Controller, Crofts (Engineers) Ltd., Bradford.
- Clarence Lewis Williams, Assistant Secretary, Merchant Navy Establishment Administration, Shipping Federation.
- Edward Atkinson Williams, Secretary of Committee, No.936 (Hertford) Squadron, Air Training Corps.
- William Cope Williams, Senior Labour Manager, Royal Ordnance Factory, Nottingham.
- John Wilson, Senior Information Officer, Central Office of Information.
- Mary Elizabeth Wilson, Headmistress, North and South Killingholme County School, Lincolnshire.
- Roland Winn, Secretary, Summersons Holdings Ltd.
- Reginald Howe Winter. For political and public services in St. Helens.
- Denis Witney. Lately Head of the Agricultural Economics Department, Edinburgh and East of Scotland College of Agriculture.
- William Thompson Yates, Senior Executive Officer, Home Office.
- Felicity Ann Yonge. For political services.
- James Henry Anderson, British Pro-Consul, Lille.
- Katherine Rose Ashton, lately British Pro-Consul, Lima.
- Lieutenant-Colonel James Ernest Capon Banham, Senior Communications Officer, Office of the Commissioner-General for Her Majesty's Government in the United Kingdom in South-East Asia.
- Arthur Leonard Bannister, Training Manager, Kuwait Oil Co. Ltd.
- Dorothy Gladys Baux, British subject resident in Brazil.
- Francis Martin Beatty, Assistant Representative, British Council, Brazil.
- Frederick Richard Lewis Bowron, lately Communications Officer, Her Majesty's Embassy, Vientiane.
- Isabella Donald Smith Camp, Chief Nursing Officer to the Iraqi Ministry of Health.
- William Robertson Chisholm, Deputy Governor, Spandau Prison, Berlin.
- Nessim Corriat, British Pro-Consul, Casablanca.
- Ernest Reginald Croft, Manager, Patons & Baldwins Ltd., Shanghai.
- Arthur Sydney Dyer, British Vice Consul, Bilbao.
- Flora Krystyria Jedynak, Clerical Officer, Her Majesty's Embassy, Berne.
- Joseph McElroy, lately Headmaster of the British School, Punta Arenas.
- Harry Patrick Missen, Travel Officer, United Kingdom Mission to the United Nations, New York.
- Vivian Yseulte Doreen Molesworth, Secretary, Visa Department of Her Majesty's Embassy, Istanbul.
- Walter Sydney Morrish, lately Accountant and Administrative Officer, British Council, Iran.
- John Laughton Partington, MC, British subject resident in the Argentine Republic.
- Mary Jet Lane-Poole, Shorthand-typist, Her Majesty's Consulate-General, Istanbul.
- Eva Doris Price, Her Majesty's Vice Consul and Administration Officer, Bucharest
- Victor Oswald Riley, Chief Clerk, HM Ministry of Works Office, Singapore.
- Marguerite Annie Sanceau, Archivist, Her Majesty's Consulate-General, Oporto.
- Mary Emma Skeaping, Mistress of Ballet, Royal Opera House, Stockholm.
- The Reverend Father Henry James Smith, British subject resident in Hayti.
- Charles Harold Tarrant, lately Archivist, Her Majesty's Embassy, Tokyo.
- Giovanna Thompson, Representative of the Save the Children Fund in Italy.
- Agnes Richmond Paterson Willis, Consular Clerk, Her Majesty's Embassy, Washington.
- Raymond Langford Akers, Acting Director, Drainage & Irrigation Department, Federation of Malaya.
- Edith Augusta Mary Bazeley. For social welfare services in Umtali, Southern Rhodesia.
- Mary Hugh Berrell, Mother Superior of the Sisters of Mercy Hospital at Albury, State of New South Wales.
- William Dickie Birrell, Town Clerk and Treasurer of the City of Kew, State of Victoria.
- Colin Boocock, Director of Geological Survey, Bechuanaland Protectorate.
- Maurice Stanley Bradbury, lately Senior Draughtsman, Directorate of Naval Armament Inspection, Naval Headquarters, India.
- Mary Bradshaw. For services to patriotic and social welfare movements in the Terang District, State of Victoria.
- John Astell Burt, a member of the United Kingdom community in Karachi, Pakistan.
- Bernice Leila Campbell, Matron of the Devon General Hospital, Latrobe, State of Tasmania.
- Albert Ernest Carlyle. For municipal services in Heidelberg and Melbourne, State of Victoria.
- Joan Merry Carlyle, Missionary-in-Charge at the South African General Mission Station, Mbuluzi, Swaziland.
- Ethel Georgina Clancey. For services to charitable movements in Sydney, State of New South Wales.
- Beatrice Crommelin, Matron, Glen Innes Hospital, State of New South Wales.
- Louise Elizabeth Selma Davies. For social welfare services in Port Victoria, State of South Australia.
- Nola Laird Dekyvere. For services to charitable and cultural institutions in the State of New South Wales.
- Robert William Fox. For services to disabled ex-servicemen in the State of Queensland.
- Aella Giblin. For services to the Kindergarten movement in the State of Tasmania.
- George Hoyden Howard Gill. For services to charitable and sporting organisations in the State of Queensland.
- Katherine Mary Godfrey. For services to the African community in Umtali and Marandellas, Southern Rhodesia.
- William Charles Griffin. For charitable and philanthropic services in the Mulgrave Shire, State of Queensland.
- Francis Leslie Hallett, formerly Town Clerk, Richmond City Council, State of Victoria.
- Lucy Louise Handley. For services to the Red Cross in the State of Queensland.
- Knud Hansen. For services to the community in the Umboe and Doma district, Southern Rhodesia.
- Irene Joyce Hill, Honorary Treasurer of the Child Welfare Society, Bulawayo, Southern Rhodesia.
- Harold William Langham-Hobart, Assistant Architect, Public Works Department, Basutoland.
- Dorothy Violet Hunt. For services to the Country Women's Association, State of South Australia.
- Maud Elena Hutchinson. For social welfare services in the State of Victoria.
- Edgar Ord Laird, a former member of the Malayan Civil Service.
- Thomas McCormack. For services to sport and philanthropy in the State of Queensland.
- Malcolm Angus McPhee. For charitable services in the Mackay district, State of Queensland.
- Eliza Ellen Moffatt. For social welfare services in Maseru, Basutoland.
- John Leo Molan, Budget Officer, Treasury Department, State of Victoria.
- Nina Morrison, Headmistress, Walford Church of England Girls' Grammar School, State of South Australia.
- Erica Mary Muir. For social welfare services in Mbabane, Swaziland.
- Gertrude Mary Opie, Convenor of the Serving Division of the Royal Adelaide Hospital Auxiliary, State of South Australia.
- Olive Packham. For social welfare services in Bulawayo, Southern Rhodesia.
- Florence Margaret Elizabeth Pepper, Matron, Queen Elizabeth II Hospital, Maseru, Basutoland.
- Sheila Mary Stirling Sample, a member of the United Kingdom community in Calcutta, India.
- Elizabeth Skillen, a member of the staff of the Sydney Teachers College, State of New South Wales.
- Edith Preston-Stanley. For social welfare services, especially to handicapped children, in the State of New South Wales.
- Mary. Stewart Tully. For social welfare services in the Berea District, Basutoland.
- Alexander Watson, Acting Senior Executive Engineer, Public Works Department, Federation of Malaya.
- John Maurice Cahill Wheeler, lately Superintendent of Police, Federation of Malaya.
- Joseph Fairfax Agard. For public services in Trinidad.
- County Chief Stefano Akabwai, Teso District Administration, Uganda.
- Marian Fehintola Akinyemi. For public services in the Western Region, Nigeria.
- Paul Louis Anthony, Chief Superintendent, Department of Telecommunications, Singapore.
- Abdulla Awadh, Deputy Valuer, Aden Municipality.
- Benjamin Olatunji Oyewade Awonusi. For public services in the Western Region, Nigeria.
- Eric Evans Bailey, Administrative Officer, Nyasaland.
- The Reverend Canon Ezekieri Balaba. For public services in Uganda.
- Philip Bannister, Veterinary Officer, Northern Rhodesia.
- Myra Eugenie Batchelor, Joint Chief Supervisor, Singapore Telephone Board.
- Reginald Norman Kershaw Beresford, Administrative Officer, Cyprus.
- Betty Pinkerton Boyd. For public services in Uganda.
- Arthur Brown. For services to the Boy Scout movement in the Federation of Nigeria.
- Nanak Chand. For public services in Tanganyika.
- Chandrasinh Jesangbhai Chohan, Assistant Establishment Officer, Tankanyika.
- Lois Doris Green Cooper, Mistress, Berbice High School, British Guiana.
- Major Karl Thomson Craig, Steward, University College of the West Indies.
- Daniel Babatunde Davies, Accountant, Treasury Department, Western Region, Nigeria.
- Jacob Benoni Davies, Chief Surgical Assistant, Sierra Leone.
- Alfred Owen Dawodu, Station Superintendent, West African Airways Corporation, Federation of Nigeria.
- Francis William de St. Croix, Rural Education Officer, Northern Region Nigeria.
- Joseph Nicholas de Souza, Technical Assistant (Special Grade), Public Works Department, Singapore.
- John Lewis D'Espagnac, Engineer, Railways Department, Mauritius.
- Queenie Ibironke Doherty. For public services in the Western Region, Nigeria.
- James Stewart Dunbar, Chief Draughtsman, Geological Survey, Tanganyika.
- John Cecil Lincoln Durant, District Officer, Northern Rhodesia.
- Chief Efiong Udo Ekong. For public services in the Eastern Region, Nigeria.
- Henry Osita Emembolu, Administrative Officer, Eastern Region, Nigeria.
- Lieutenant-Commander John Fleming, Staff Officer, Malayan Royal Naval Volunteer Reserve, Singapore.
- Mary Olive Fletcher, Queen Elizabeth Overseas Nursing Service, Matron, Eastern Region, Nigeria.
- George Forsythe, Assistant Superintendent, Cyprus Police Force.
- Paramount Chief Kenewa Gamanga, JP. For public services in Sierra Leone.
- George Dudley Gamblin. For public services in the Bahamas.
- Captain George Gardner, Community Development Officer, Kenya.
- Sylvanus Opaiyi Pabs-Garnon. For public services in Northern Region, Nigeria.
- Arthur Stephen Garrett, MB, BS, Medical Officer, Leprosy Service, Eastern Region, Nigeria.
- Terence John Frederick Gavaghan, District Officer i/c Rehabilitation, Mwea Works Camps, Kenya.
- Garrett Forbes Godden, Senior Soil Conservation Officer, Nyasaland.
- Goh Kim Toon, Auditor, Audit Department, Hong Kong.
- Mary Abbott Goode. For public services in North Borneo.
- Chief William Balafiama Dublin-Green. For public services in the Eastern Region, Nigeria.
- Henry Powell Greensmith, Parks Superintendent, Nairobi City Council, Kenya.
- Peggy Alma Gunn. For public services in Aden.
- Mark Gordon Hall, Senior Superintendent of Prisons, Tanganyika.
- Hugh William Handford. For services to the Trade Union movement in Northern Rhodesia.
- Audrey Dorothy Harcourt, Private Secretary, Government House, Fiji.
- Peter Coombe Harris, Assistant Secretary, Administrator's Office, East Africa High Commission.
- Abdulsalaam Hassan, Assistant Education Officer, Somaliland.
- Syed Ali Hasson Ali, Cashier, Treasury, Aden.
- Ahmet Hilmi, Chief Revenue Officer, Cyprus.
- Alice Elizabeth Hirst, Senior Lecturer in Education, Fourah Bay College, Sierra Leone.
- Evripides Iacovou, Headmaster, Reform School, Lapithos, Cyprus.
- Edith Dalton James, Head Teacher, Chetolah Park Government School, Jamaica.
- William Alexander James, Secretary/Supervisor, 4-H Clubs, Jamaica.
- The Reverend Thomas John Knox Jamieson. For public services in the New Hebrides.
- Ben Jannif. For public services in Fiji.
- Romer Frank Sylvester Johnstone, JP. For public services in Trinidad.
- Samuel Oyebola Jolaoso, Higher Executive Officer, Nigerian Broadcasting Corporation.
- Winnifred Carlotta Jones, Matron, King George V Jubilee Memorial Sanatorium, Jamaica.
- Edmund Joseph, Prisons Superintendent, Trinidad.
- Chief Kawinga. For public services in Nyasaland.
- Frank Kennedy, Administrative Officer, Eastern Region, Nigeria.
- Patrick Christian Keun. Lately Assistant Registrar of Co-operative Societies, and Cooperative Officer, Masaka, Uganda.
- The Reverend Canon Randolph Olenthius Constantino King. For public services in Jamaica.
- Adelowo Olanipekun Latubosun, Senior Education Officer, Northern Region, Nigeria.
- Mallam Mohamet Lawan, Senior Agricultural Officer, Northern Region, Nigeria.
- Leung Tak Wa, Clerk (Special Class), Inland Revenue, Hong Kong.
- Samuel Ernest Littlehales Luke. For public services in Sierra Leone.
- James Broughton McCarthy, Senior Administrative Officer, Sierra Leone Selection Trust.
- Amelia Annie Macdonald. For public services in the Federation of Nigeria.
- Janet Thomson McLundie, Higher Executive Officer, Office of the Crown Agents for Oversea Governments and Administrations.
- Joseph Victor Martins, Chief Civil Engineer, Transport & Harbours Department, British Guiana.
- Benedictus Joseph Labre Mato, BEM, Secretary & Treasurer, South Mara Native Council, Tanganyika.
- Captain John Henry Hilton Mills, DFM, Chief Pilot & Operations Superintendent, Aden Airways Ltd.
- Harry Augustus Moonsawmy, County Sanitary Inspector, British Guiana.
- Athol John Curtis James Moulder, Officer-in-Charge, Fort George Signal Station, Bermuda.
- Ada Gertrude Naylor, Principal, Girls' Grammar School, Suva, Fiji.
- Pedro Custodio Sebastiao Cristalino Nazareth, Accountant, Treasury, Uganda.
- Julius Bismark Nyirenda, Assistant Master, Education Department, Northern Rhodesia.
- Arthur Thorpe Orton, Dredger Officer, Public Works Department, British Honduras.
- Michael Ajetunbi Oyewoga Osho, Agricultural Superintendent, Western Region, Nigeria.
- Daniel Arthur Perryman, Cocoa Agronomist, Windward Islands.
- William Lewis Polley. For public services in Northern Rhodesia.
- Vaithilingam Ponniah, Office Assistant, Ministry of Commerce & Industry, Singapore.
- Costas John Psintros, Assistant Electrical & Mechanical Engineer, Cyprus.
- Seiyid Hasson as Saffi. For public services in Aden.
- Ahmet Sami, Administrative Assistant, Cyprus.
- Sylvanus Akinrokun Samuel, Senior Registrar, Supreme Court, Federation of Nigeria.
- Samuel Jonathan Okeke Sarr, Station Manager, West African Airways Corporation, Bathurst, Gambia.
- Mohamed Hussein Shah, Chief Goods Clerk, East African Railways and Harbours Administration.
- Gulamrasul Sherdel, Liwali of Bagamoyo Township and Coast, Tanganyika.
- Sara Helen Simpson. For public services in Kenya.
- Alhaji Abd-ur-Rahim Alabi Smith. For public services in the Federation of Nigeria.
- John Smith, Chief Clerk to House of Assembly, Bahamas.
- Francis Olatunde Ridley Sogunro, Higher Executive Officer, Administrator General's Department, Federation of Nigeria.
- Annie Lavinia Stafford, Hotel Manageress, East African Railways and Harbours Administration.
- Dennis Percival Stanfield. For public services in the Western Region, Nigeria.
- Inche Mohamed Taib bin Awang Besar, Secretary to the British Resident, Brunei.
- Albert Edward Leonard Thorpe, Agricultural Superintendent, Northern Region, Nigeria.
- Nicholas Diala Ukah. For public services in the Eastern Region, Nigeria.
- Agnes Mary Vanthall, Private Secretary to Colonial Secretary, Hong Kong.
- Vun Hong Kyong, Office Superintendent, Secretariat, North Borneo.
- Reginald Charles Wells, Press Superintendent, Uganda.
- Fyn David-West, Administrative Assistant, Western Region, Nigeria.
- Wong Ngiong Hua. For public services in Sarawak.
- Francis Ernest Wood, Head Postmaster, East African Posts and Telecommunications Administration.
- Aileen Woods, Programme Assistant, Class I, Radio Hong Kong.
- Christine Marjorie Woods, Matron, Medical Department, British Solomon Islands Protectorate.
- The Reverend Norman Harvey Wright, Chief Probation Officer, Fiji.
- Robertson Ramsay Wright, Photographer, Public Relations Office, Fiji.

Honorary Member

- Yahya Alawi el-Yafii, Information Officer, Zanzibar.

=== Companion of the Imperial Service Order (ISO) ===
Home Civil Service

- Eric Bruce Anderson, Head of Division, Ministry of Agriculture, Fisheries & Food (Edgware.)
- Douglas Macdonald Bridges, Chief Executive Officer, Ministry of Pensions & National Insurance (Juniper Green.)
- Frederick William Sudd, Deputy Director of Audit, Exchequer and Audit Department (London, SE.3.)
- Leslie Johns Edgcombe, Chief Experimental Officer, Department of Scientific and Industrial Research (London, SE.9.)
- Ernest Frederick Selby Fisher, Deputy Director of Stores, Naval Store Department, Admiralty (Hong Kong.)
- Herbert George Granville, Chief Executive Officer, General Post Office (Uxbridge.)
- Gilbert Leslie Hall, Chief Executive Officer, Ministry of Health (Beckenham.)
- Francis John Heritage, OBE. Lately Private Secretary to First Parliamentary Counsel (Hounslow.)
- John Henry Keys, Chief Executive Officer, Air Ministry (Sonning-on-Thames.)
- Alexander Kinnear, Director of Housing and Hostels, Principal Executive Officer, Ministry of Supply (Bromley.)
- James Macfarlane, DCM, General Inspector, Department of Health for Scotland (Aberdeen.)
- John Riddell McMillan, Chief Executive Officer, Board of Customs & Excise (Northwood.)
- Arthur Thomas May, Chief Executive Officer, Ministry of Power (Kemsing.)
- Reginald Pearce, Controller, Assessments Division, Board of Inland Revenue (East Preston.)
- Eric John Pedlar, Chief Executive Officer, Crown Estate Office (Keston.)
- Frederick Herbert Pugh, Regional Finance Officer, Midlands Region, Ministry of Labour & National Service (Sutton Coldfield.)
- Rupert John Reay, Chief Executive Officer, War Office (Hong Kong.)
- Frank Sedgley, Chief Executive Officer, Home Office (London, SW.12.)
- Cuthbert Edward Shelley, Senior Engineer, Ministry of Works (Sidcup.)
- Harry George Stride, OBE, Chief Clerk, Royal Mint (Surbiton.)
- Arnold Clifford Sturman, Chief Executive Officer, Ministry of Housing & Local Government (Hove.)
- Albert Richard Swinnerton, OBE. Lately Principal, Commonwealth Relations Office (Barnet.)
- Henry Ian Herick Titchener, MBE, Chief Executive Officer, Colonial Office (Isleworth.)
- George Johnson White, OBE. Lately Grade 1A Officer, Branch B, Foreign Office (London, SW.16.)

State of Victoria and Southern Rhodesia

- John Armstrong, Secretary for Labour and Social Welfare, Southern Rhodesia.
- Arnaldo Joseph Lewis James, Under-Secretary, Department of the Chief Secretary, State of Victoria.

Overseas Civil Service

- Herbert Edward Durant Bernez, Superintendent of Lands & Surveys and Commissioner of Crown Lands, St. Lucia, Windward Islands.
- Caesar Peter de Freitas, Commissioner of Lands, Jamaica.
- Harold William Easton Ginner, Deputy Director of Education, Tanganyika.
- Lulworth Darrell Punch, Warden, County Caroni, Trinidad.
- Eric Thomas Ward, Provincial Agricultural Officer, Southern Highlands Province, Tanganyika.
- Ronald Mackay Wood. Lately Director of Public Works, North Borneo.

=== British Empire Medal (BEM) ===
Military Division

Royal Navy

- Chief Master Jimmy Torubiri Akraka, Nigerian Naval Force.
- Chief Engine Room Artificer Laurence Frederick Bailey, C/MX.59008.
- Acting Chief Wren Steward (O) Sheila Bainbridge, 64614, Women's Royal Naval Service.
- Chief Petty Officer Thomas Barrett, P/JX.144058.
- Chief Engineering Mechanic Charles Samuel Beard, C/KX.89031.
- Chief Engine Room Artificer John Charles Bennett, D/MX.52917.
- Chief Petty Officer Jonathan Frederick Budd, P/J.97779.
- Petty Officer Patrick Christmas, C/JX.820157.
- Chief Electrical Artificer Kingsley Edwin John Corbin, P/MX.66049.
- Chief Petty Officer Cook (S) Alfred James Frederick Jellicoe Cripps, D/MX.54193.
- Stares Chief Petty Officer (S) William Henry Douglas Cumbers, D/MX.54137.
- Chief Aircraft Artificer William Arthur Davies, L/FX.78248.
- Colour Sergeant Anthony Merideth Diprose, Ply.X.3313, Royal Marines.
- Chief Petty Officer Writer Donald William Edwards, P/MX.58749.
- Sick Berth Chief Petty Officer Donald Walter Garrod, C/MX.49372.
- Chief Petty Officer Writer Eric Godden, C/MX.57208.
- Chief Electrician Leonard Albert Cecil Hanson, P/MX.857969.
- Chief Petty Officer Gordon Hopewell, P/JX.155839.
- Aircraft Mechanician 1st Class Evan Charles Morgan, L/FX.76927.
- Chief Petty Officer Charles Thomas Naish, P/JX.138546.
- Sick Berth Chief Petty Officer James Poulton, C/MX.48843.
- Petty Officer Telegraphist Reuben Rodgers, P/J.74748.
- Chief Petty Officer Cook (O) Cecil Roy Smith, DSM, P/MX.51629.
- Chief Yeoman of Signals Derrick Dickerson Spindler, C/JX.147242.
- Chief Petty Officer Stanley Adolphus Stephens, D/JX.142425.
- Colour Sergeant Albert Reginald Sully, Ply.X.1555, Royal Marines.
- Chief Engineering Mechanic Michael Sultana, E/KX.86875.
- Chief Petty Officer Telegraphist Walter Taylor. C/JX.163615.
- Petty Officer Wilfred Vissenga, P/JX.154748.
- Colour Sergeant Cecil Harry Weight, Ch.X.2065, Royal Marines.
- Leading Seaman Arnold James Burden Whitton, D/JX.878990.

Army

- 2813810 Sergeant Alexander Archibald, The Seaforth Highlanders (Ross-shire Buffs, The Duke of Albany's), Territorial Army.
- 22538074 Sergeant (acting) Harry Bamforth, Corps of Royal Engineers.
- 22298906 Sergeant (acting) Albert William Hamilton Barham, Corps of Royal Electrical & Mechanical Engineers.
- 2562241 Corporal Alexander Baxter, Royal Corps of Signals, Territorial Army.
- 21023477 Staff-Sergeant William Manning Berridge, Royal Army Veterinary Corps.
- T/27451 Sergeant Edwin James Boyd, Royal Army Service Corps, Territorial Army.
- 21192212 Squadron Quartermaster Sergeant George Davidson Compton, Corps of Royal Engineers, Territorial Army.
- 6978063 Sergeant William Connor, Army Catering Corps.
- T/22293039 Warrant Officer Class II (acting) Harry Lionel Dalwood, Royal Army Service Corps.
- NA/29162 Sergeant Abderiman Danboa, The Queen's Own Nigeria Regiment, Royal West African Frontier Force.
- 14054716 Sergeant Thomas Howell Davies, Corps of Royal Engineers.
- S/21062397 Staff-Sergeant Richard William Doney, Royal Army Service Corps.
- 22260684 Sergeant (acting) Arthur Charles Elms, Royal Regiment of Artillery.
- 4337255 Colour-Sergeant George William Exelby, The East Yorkshire Regiment (The Duke of York's Own), Territorial Army.
- 2717458 Warrant Officer Class II (acting) David Ferguson, Irish Guards.
- 14411561 Staff-Sergeant (acting) (now Sergeant) Francis John Freeman, Corps of Royal Electrical & Mechanical Engineers (now 8th King's Royal Irish Hussars, Royal Armoured Corps).
- 14459365 Sergeant Albert Edward Fulcher, Royal Army Veterinary Corps.
- 22239075 Warrant Officer Class II (local) (Artillery Clerk) Sydney Charles Haselton, Royal Regiment of Artillery, Territorial Army.
- 22818754 Warrant Officer Class II (acting) Magnus Herbert Hedge, Corps of Royal Engineers, Territorial Army.
- 21016556 Staff-Sergeant Harold Hewitt, Corps of Royal Engineers, Territorial Army.
- NS/5567024 Warrant Officer Class II (acting) Philip Hobbs, The Wiltshire Regiment (Duke of Edinburgh's).
- 22515473 Staff-Sergeant (local) William Danby Holden, Royal Corps of Signals.
- 22566127 Staff-Sergeant (Artillery Clerk) Fred Hudson, Royal Regiment of Artillery, Territorial Army.
- 194644 8 Warrant Officer Class II (acting) Arthur William Hutt, Corps of Royal Electrical & Mechanical Engineers.
- 22544660 Sergeant (Drum-Major) William John Jenkins, The East Surrey Regiment, Territorial Army.
- 3645797 Staff-Sergeant John Milne Keppie, The Royal Scots (The Royal Regiment), Territorial Army.
- 22261522 Battery-Quartermaster-Sergeant Herbert Lambley, Royal Regiment of Artillery, Territorial Army.
- 22542341 Warrant Officer Class II (acting) Alexander McGowan, Corps of Royal Electrical & Mechanical Engineers.
- 2547961 Sergeant John Arthur Metcalfe, Corps of Royal Electrical & Mechanical Engineers.
- 3185533 Sergeant (acting) Thomas Davidson Moffat, The King's Own Scottish Borderers.
- 22221469 Sergeant John Richard North, The Northamptonshire Regiment, Territorial Army.
- 22219580 Sergeant Alfred Charles Oswald, The Royal Welch Fusiliers, Territorial Army.
- T/270924 Sergeant John James Parsons, Royal Army Service Corps, Territorial Army.
- 62538 Staff-Sergeant Victor Leith Reginald Phillips, Army Catering Corps.
- 2646457 Colour-Sergeant Arthur Henry Risebrook, Coldstream Guards.
- 557077 Warrant Officer Class II (acting) George Sheldon, 8th King's Royal Irish Hussars, Royal Armoured Corps.
- 14467792 Staff-Sergeant (Armament Artificer) Reginald Frank Sheppard, Corps of Royal Electrical & Mechanical Engineers.
- W/105336 Staff-Sergeant Angeline Catherine Spears, Women's Royal Army Corps.
- S/807501 Staff-Sergeant Arthur Percival Taylor, Royal Army Service Corps.
- 14961595 Staff-Sergeant David Meirion Thomas, Royal Army Pay Corps.
- S/23214053 Sergeant Leslie Francis Tucker, Royal Army Service Corps.
- 22224444 Warrant Officer Class II (acting) Andrew Watson, Royal Army Medical Corps, Territorial Army.
- 14444485 Warrant Officer Class II (acting) Ian Reddick Whiteford, Corps of Royal Engineers.
- T/21016848 Warrant Officer Class II (acting) Walter Edmund Whyte, Royal Army Service Corps.
- S/6849451 Staff-Sergeant Edwin John Williams, Royal Army Service Corps.

Royal Air Force

- 570690 Flight Sergeant Thomas Laurie Brown.
- 520003 Flight Sergeant Donald Sidney Cooke.
- 573378 Flight Sergeant Sidney George Cucksey.
- 1853803 Flight Sergeant Frederick Thomas Edwards.
- 645499 Flight Sergeant Douglas Endersby Foster.
- 614834 Flight Sergeant Derek Colwyn George.
- 566698 Flight Sergeant Ralph Frederick Glover.
- 523142 Flight Sergeant Felix Mervyn Holmes.
- 535073 Flight Sergeant Wallace Holmes.
- 561783 Flight Sergeant Albert Kirman.
- 567783 Flight Sergeant Ronald Pryse.
- 591262 Flight Sergeant Bruce Howard Roberts.
- 771815 Flight Sergeant Oswald St. John Roberts.
- 566095 Flight Sergeant John Alexander Rossiter.
- 570485 Flight Sergeant William George Newcourt Sanders.
- 619610 Flight Sergeant Frederick James Wakeham.
- 2407615 Flight Sergeant Frederick Wappat.
- 525562 Chief Technician Norman Barnes.
- 579016 Chief Technician John Mills.
- 537691 Chief Technician Leith Vincent St. Ruth.
- 577578 Chief Technician Robert Samuel.
- 576207 Chief Technician Cyril James David Schofield.
- 561667 Chief Technician Henry Robert Weeks.
- 621522 Acting Flight Sergeant William Burt Badley.
- 613693 Acting Flight Sergeant John Rouen O'Brien.
- 1177510 Acting Flight Sergeant James George Petrie.
- 573040 Acting Flight Sergeant Kenneth William Shonk.
- 513343 Acting Flight Sergeant Richard Soley Thomas.
- 2148976 Sergeant Joy Marion Brame, Women's Royal Air Force.
- 971801 Sergeant Robert Buston.
- 4023515 Sergeant John Ramsay Eddershaw.
- 905944 Sergeant Stanley Edward James Gorringe.
- 1178947 Sergeant Alfred Victor Hamer.
- 575481 Sergeant John Leslie Hayward.
- 947658 Sergeant James Higginbotham, RAF Regiment.
- 3020089 Sergeant John Francis McLean.
- 2231738 Sergeant Francis Ballaine Norman.
- 1079790 Sergeant John George Shenton.
- 532552 Sergeant Bernard Frank Stinson.
- 1920017 Acting Sergeant James Robert Dennis.
- 585666 Acting Sergeant Michael James Johnson.
- 584441 Corporal Edward Charles Walter.
- 4003276 Corporal Frank Stanhope Williams.
- 4164380 Acting Corporal Aaron John Davies.
- 5033024 Senior Aircraftman John McGuire.

Civil Division

United Kingdom

- Edith Daisy Baker, Deputy County Organiser, Isle of Wight, Women's Voluntary Services. (Ventnor).
- David Grant Balfour, Foreman Electrician, North-Eastern Electricity Board. (Newcastle upon Tyne).
- Violet Georgina Clara Barton, Warden, St. Barbara's Approved Probation Home, Purbrook, Hampshire.
- Edmund Graham Bell, Chief Plumber, SS Andes, Royal Mail Lines Ltd (Southampton).
- Herbert Beresford, Foreman, Ryhope Colliery, Durham Division, National Coal Board. (Ryhope).
- Susan Mrs. Birnie, Honorary Collector, Street Savings Group, Belfast.
- Ernest William Bodger, Foreman Fitter, Thornycroft (Hampton) Boatyard Ltd., Hampton-on-Thames. (Hampton Hill).
- William Edward Bradshaw, Inspector (Postal), Post Office, Preston.
- Gwendoline Brely, Deputy County Organiser, Wiltshire, Women's Voluntary Services. (Warminster).
- Philip Francis Brooks, Yard Foreman, Exmouth Junction, Southern Region, British Railways. (Exeter).
- Frederick Sharpe Bullen, Chief Observer, Post.7/B.l. No.7 Group, Royal Observer Corps. (Lakenheath, Suffolk).
- Norman Burney, Foreman, F. Perkins Ltd., Peterborough.
- Florence Annie Burton, Assistant Nurse, St Margaret's Hospital, Epping.
- William Henry Butler, Apprentice Instructor, Supermarine Works, Vickers-Armstrongs (Aircraft) Ltd. (Southampton).
- William Cambridge, Chargehand Moulder, Ardeer Foundry Co. Ltd., Stevenston, Ayrshire.
- Henry Robert Caplen, Station Officer, Hampshire Fire Brigade, Petersfield.
- Philip Carre, Auxiliary Postman, Sark, Channel Islands.
- Ebenezer John Caudwell, Exhauster and Electric Generating Plant Attendant, Bow Common Gas Works, North Thames Gas Board. (London, E.3).
- Thomas Arthur Charlesworth, Works Manager, Abrafract Ltd., Sheffield.
- Robert Wilson Chaytor, Engine-room Storekeeper Pumpman, MV British Faith, BP Tanker Co. Ltd. (Sunderland).
- James Smith Chew. For social & charitable services in Skipton, West Riding of Yorkshire.
- Caroline Maria Chollet, Honorary Collector, Street Savings Group, Norwich.
- Votsis Christodoulides, Grade "A" Clerk, War Office, Cyprus.
- Sidney Henry Collect, MM, Foreman Stonemason, Benfield & Loxley Ltd., Oxford.
- Thomas Conlin, Head Constable, Royal Ulster Constabulary. (Bessbrook, Co. Armagh).
- David Conway, Technical Graden, No.47 Maintenance Unit, Air Ministry, Hawarden (Mold, Flintshire).
- Eric Scott Cooper, Inspector, Gloucestershire Special Constabulary. (Cheltenham).
- Thomas Corker, lately Foreman, Mid-Cheshire Group, North Western Gas Board (Frodsham, Cheshire).
- John Thomas Crackett, Supervisory Workman, Broomhill Colliery, Northern (N & Q) Division, National Coal Board (Morpeth).
- Edward Thomas Curtis, Chief Paper Keeper, Commonwealth Relations Office. (South Benfleet, Essex).
- William Henry Davis, Telephonist, RAOC Training Centre, War Office, Aldershot.
- Arthur Wilfred Percival Davy, Laboratory Worker A, Atomic Weapons Research Establishment, Aldermaston. (Basingstoke).
- Thomas Dean, Dishmaker, W. H. Grindley & Son Ltd., Stoke-on-Trent.
- Elizabeth Deathridge, Senior Overlooker, Office of Inspector of Naval Ordnance, Birmingham.
- Andrew Augustine Deignan, Head Constable, Royal Ulster Constabulary. (Newry, Co. Down).
- Thomas William Dobson, Checkweighman, Emma Colliery, Durham Division, National Coal Board. (Ryton).
- Thomas Doody, Constable, Manchester City Police.
- Charles Leo East, Honorary Collector, Marsh & Baxter Savings Group, Brierley Hill.
- William Greatorex Elliott, Foreman-in-Charge, Cranes, Workington Iron & Steel Co. (The United Steel Companies Ltd.) (Workington).
- William Oldaker Ellis, Senior Assistant (Scientific), RAF Institute of Aviation Medicine, Farnborough.
- Robert Esson, Attendant to the Lord Mayor of Manchester.
- John Bowdler Evans, Chargehand Fitter, Ironbridge Power Station, Central Electricity Generating Board. (Much Wenlock).
- Herbert Pike Firth, Postman, Higher Grade, Horncastle.
- Ernest Frederick Foreman, Foreman, Research Laboratories, General Electric Co. Ltd. (Chipperfield, Hertfordshire).
- Wong Yick Fun, Local Clerk, Grade A, HM Dockyard, Hong Kong.
- Alexander Gardner, Chief Colliery Electrical Engineer, Kingshill No.1 Colliery, Scottish Division, National Coal Board. (Shotts).
- George Giles, Civilian Warrant Officer, No.1034 (Surbiton) Squadron, Air Training Corps. (Surbiton, Surrey).
- John Gilhooley, Driver, London Midland Region, British Transport Commission (Widnes).
- Bertram Thomas Johnson Glover, MD, ChB, Chief Officer, Headquarters Section, Civil Defence Corps, Eastbourne.
- Frederick Goddard, lately Collier, Manyers Main Colliery, North-Eastern Division, National Coal Board. (Mexborough).
- Alfred Gordon Goodman, Clerk of Works, RAF Hospital, Nocton Hall. (Newark).
- Thomas James Griffiths, Inspector of Mechanics, West Baling, Western Region, British Railways. (London, W.13).
- George Richard Guttery, Chief Volunteer Officer, Ambulance Section, Civil Defence Corps, Dudley.
- George Ernest Haigh, Marine Survey Assistant, Marine Survey Office, Southampton, Ministry of Transport & Civil Aviation.
- Clifford Harland, Foreman, Weber Footwear Ltd., Tottenham. (London, N.9).
- Nina Osler Hastie, Honorary Collector, Cambuslang Street Savings Groups, Glasgow.
- John Hewitt, Overman, Sneyd Colliery, West Midlands Division, National Coal Board (Stoke-on-Trent).
- Thomas Herbert Holbrook, Technician I, Post Office Engineering Department, Newport, Monmouthshire.
- William Horsefield, Hostel Manager, Eastern Region, British Railways. (Ilford, Essex).
- George Wilfred Hutchinson, Superintendent, Liverpool City Special Constabulary.
- Frederick George James, Foreman, Nottingham District, East Midlands Gas Board (Nottingham).
- Elizabeth Jarvis, Canteen Manageress, Penzance Flight No.24 (West Cornwall) Squadron, Air Training Corps (Penzance).
- Doris Adelaide Johnson, Chief Supervisor (F), Mayfair Telephone Exchange, London. (Hounslow, Middlesex).
- Albert Jones, Caretaker, TA Centre, Chester.
- Thomas Edward Jones, Colliery First Aid Attendant, McLaren Colliery, South Western Division, National Coal Board. (Abertysswg).
- Robert Francis Judd, Technical Class, Grade II, Royal Ordnance Factory, Fazakerley, near Liverpool (Kirkby).
- George Kay, Coal Producer, Morrison North Colliery, Durham Division, National Coal Board. (Stanley).
- Albert Edward Kerr, Fitter (Electrical), Eastern Electricity Board. (London, N.9).
- Walter Usher Kerrison, Fitting Shop Foreman, North-Eastern Marine Engineering Co. Ltd., Wallsend.
- Tak Sun Lau, Chief Clerk, EME Branch, War Office, Hong Kong.
- John Sidney Diamond Jubilee Lawrence, Technician Class I, Telephone Manager's Office, Coventry. (Northampton).
- Kathleen Lee, Manageress, NAAFI Canteen, Royal Air Force Station, Wilmslow (Swinton).
- Edwin Thomas Lewer, Chargehand, Electrical Fitter, Royal Aircraft Establishment, Ministry of Supply.
- James Brunshell Lodge, Research & Development Craftsman (Special), Armament Research & Development Establishment, Ministry of Supply. (Belvedere, Kent).
- Samuel Lomas, Traffic Inspector, British Transport Waterways. (Wolverhampton).
- Alfred James Lord, Air Traffic Control Assistant, Grade II, Blackpool (Squires Gate) Airport, Ministry of Transport & Civil Aviation.
- Jack Loughlin, Foreman Electrician, Yorkshire Electricity Board. (Bessie).
- Richard Charles Lowe, Technician, Class I, Post Office, Southampton.
- Mabel Thomazine Mary Lyde, Member, Regional Staff (Transport), Birmingham, Women's Voluntary Services. (Four Oaks, Warwickshire).
- Kenneth MacAskill, Quartermaster, MS Cilicia, Anchor Line Ltd. (Bernera, Isle of Harris).
- John McCannah, Chargehand Mechanical Fitter, Ferranti Ltd. (Manchester).
- Dominic McCreadie, Assistant Divisional Officer, Western Area Fire Brigade, Argyll (Largs).
- James MacMillan, Auxiliary Postman, Nunton Sub-Office, Lochboisdale, Isle of South Uist.
- Cornelius Manley, Production Foreman, Edward Curran Engineering Ltd., Cardiff.
- Frederick William Marks, Senior Foreman, Hadfields Ltd., Sheffield.
- Charles Henry Martin, Trade Instructor, HMS Sultan, Admiralty. (Portsmouth).
- William Tulloch Arnott Millar, Assistant Laboratory-man, RN Armament Depot, Crombie. (Dunfermline).
- Robert Montgomery, Sergeant Instructor, Ulster Special Constabulary. (Casdedierg, Co. Tyrone).
- William Moore, School Instructor, King Edward's School, Birmingham.
- Leonard Alfred Morris, Technical Officer, General Post Office. (London, N.22).
- Harold Thomas Moss, Inspector of Mains, HM Dockyard, Chatham.
- Charles Ingram Murray, Apprentice Instructor, Imperial Chemical Industries Ltd (Redcar).
- Herbert Noble, Foreman, J. Blakeborough & Sons Ltd., Brighouse.
- George Matthew Nott, Supervisor, H. W. Carter & Co. Ltd., Coleford, Gloucester.
- James Henry Gates, Honorary Collector, Pulsometer Engineering Co. Savings Group, Reading.
- Winifred Oliver, Honorary Collector, Springvale Road No.2 Savings Group, Sheffield.
- Alice Nellie Orme, Honorary Organiser, Stanstead Lodge, Lewisham, Women's Voluntary Services. (Beckenham, Kent).
- Margaret Orr, Policewoman Sergeant, Lanarkshire Constabulary. (Hamilton).
- Philip Overall, Chef, MS Rangitiki, New Zealand Shipping Co. Ltd. (Epsom).
- Hubert Page, Head Porter, Coventry and Warwickshire Hospital.
- John Norman Pain, Assistant Station Radio Officer, Government Communications Headquarters, Foreign Office. (Taunton).
- Cecil Boley Palk, Foreman, HM Dockyard, Devonport. (Plymouth).
- Gilbert Edward Palmer, Station Officer, Ambulance Section, Civil Defence Corps, Bristol.
- Arthur Parkin, Section Leader (Draughtsman), Worthington-Simpson Ltd., Newark.
- Daisy Ella Doveton Parratt, Commandant, Gloucester Detachment, and Divisional Youth Officer, Stroud, British Red Cross Society.
- James William Pattison, Deputy, Cambois Colliery, Northern (N & C) Division, National Coal Board. (Cambois).
- Joshua Payton, Principal Male Nurse, St. Luke's (VD) Clinic, Manchester. (Blackpool).
- Robert Pemberton, Baths Superintendent, Parsonage Colliery, North Western Division, National Coal Board. (Leigh).
- Harold Phillips, JP, Miner, Harworth Colliery, East Midlands Division, National Coal Board. (Doncaster).
- Hayward John Hawke Phillips, Chief Inspector (Postal), Head Post Office, Exeter.
- Henry Charles Phillips, Inspector (Engineering), Telephone Manager's Office, Canterbury. (Chatham).
- Nigel Vincent Piper, Civilian Instructor, Grade III, RAF Technical College, Henlow (Tring).
- James Polson, Warden, Beinn Eighe Nature Reserve, Nature Conservancy, Ross-shire.
- Ernest William Porter, Engine Driver, Eastern Region, British Railways. (March).
- Charles Prendergast, lately Shift Foreman Stoker, Bow Power Station, Central Electricity Generating Board. (Dagenham).
- Frederick George Presland, Modeller, Royal Army Medical College, War Office. (Ash Vale, Surrey).
- Lewis Priest, lately Chief Officer, Class I, HM Prison Manchester.
- Isherwood Priestley, Twiner Doubler, W. & R. K. Lee Ltd., Sowerby Bridge.
- Robert William Pumphrey, Chargehand Mason, North Eastern Region, British Railways. (Morley).
- Thomas Quinn, Safety Officer, Thurcroft Colliery, North Eastern Division, National Coal Board. (Thurcroft).
- Marguerite Alice Rawlins, Signals Supervisor, British Overseas Airways Corporation. (East Croydon, Surrey).
- Charles William Read, Batman, Staff College, War Office, Camberley.
- Alexander Richardson, Honorary Collector, Blackhill Colliery Savings Group, Berwick-on-Tweed.
- George William Ridgwell, Inspector, Metropolitan Police. (London, S.W.3).
- Harold Wilfred Walter Roach, MM, Chief Inspector, War Department Constabulary (Bramley, Hampshire).
- Ronald William Rudling, Technician III, Atomic Energy Research Establishment, Harwell.
- Percy John Sage, Farm Bailiff, Foot & Mouth Disease Research Institute, Pirbright.
- Regonald Arthur Salway, Foreman, Grade 1, Bristol Sub-Area, South Western Electricity Board. (Bristol).
- Herbert Frederick Sands, Chief Observer, Post 6/H.3. No.6 Group, Royal Observer Corps (South Creake, Norfolk).
- Henry Herbert Sherbourne, Head Gardener, French Region, Imperial War Graves Commission.
- Frank Bearn Sibborn, Instructor, Grade III, No.6 Flying Training School, Termhill (Hodnet, Salop).
- Ann Silversydes Sim, Chief Supervisor (F), Stonebow Telephone Exchange, York.
- Henry Robertson Sime, Senior Foreman of Works, Scottish Home Department (Glasgow).
- Harry Southon, Instructor, Warden Section, Civil Defence Corps, Dorking, Surrey.
- William John Stalley, Non-Technical Class, Grade II, Royal Ordnance Factory, Bishopton, Renfrewshire. (Paisley).
- Sydney Stevens, Storekeeper, Food Investigation Organisation, Department of Scientific and Industrial Research. (Aylesford, Kent).
- William Henry Stevens, Foreman, Colham Green Nurseries, Hillingdon, Middlesex.
- William Stewart, Manager of Salmon Fishings, Fochabers Estate, Morayshire.
- Cyril Stone, Blacksmith, Pleasley Colliery, East Midlands Division, National Coal Board. (Pleasley).
- Arthur Albert Strevett, Station Officer, West Sussex Fire Brigade, Crawley.
- Joseph Edward Stripe, Watcher, London Port, Board of Customs & Excise. (London, E.17).
- Frank Swepson, Assistant Manager, Grade III, Land Drainage Machinery Workshop, Peterborough.
- William Albert Taylor, Boatswain, SS Pretoria Castle, Union Castle Mail Steamship Co. Ltd. (Chandler's Ford, Hampshire).
- Herbert Thomas, Overman, Gresford Colliery, North Western Division, National Coal Board. (Wrexham).
- Ida Florence Tomkins, Superintendent Storewoman, Post Office Supplies Department, Wolverton.
- Willoughby Henry Travers, Station Officer, HM Coastguard, Bembridge, Isle of Wight.
- Louis Wall, Senior Storeman, Central Store, East Lancashire Territorial & Auxiliary Forces Association. (Manchester).
- James Albert Walmsley, Technical Class, Grade II, Royal Ordnance Factory, Burghfield (Reading).
- Ernest Ward, Conveyor Attendant, Skelton Grange Power Station, Central Electricity Generating Board. (Leeds).
- Frederick William Waters, Electrician, Ministry of Works. (London, S.E.3).
- Andrew Watt, Civil Defence Officer, Bruce Peebles & Co. Ltd., Edinburgh.
- Reginald Albert Weeks, Shift Foreman, Bath Gas Works, South Western Gas Board (Bath).
- Thomas West, JP, Postman, Higher Grade, Westhoughton, Bolton.
- Rose Alice White, Sub-Postmistress, Mount Pleasant Road Sub-Office, Hastings.
- Gabriel Parks Williams, Honorary Collector, Standard Telephones & Cables Ltd. (Treforest Estate) Savings Group, Rhondda.
- William Stanley Napier Williams, Leading Draughtsman (Engineering), Air Ministry (Harrogate).
- Walter Ernest Wilson, Technical Officer, Post Office, Belfast.
- Frederick William Witton, Assistant (Scientific), Royal Mint (London, S.E.13).
- Frederick Robert Woodward, Research & Development (Special) Inspector, Royal Aircraft Establishment, Ministry of Supply (Blackwater, Surrey).
- Annie Jane Wright, Honorary Collector, Street Savings Groups, Folkestone.
- William Acton Wright, Manager (No.7 Works), Punched Card Factory, Powers-Samas Accounting Machines Ltd. (Croydon).
- Alfred Thomas Wyatt, General Assistant, Personal Services Branch, Pullman Car Co. Ltd., British Transport Commission (West Wickham, Kent).

Tasmania

- Joyce Cane, Transport Driver, Tasmanian Division, Australian Red Cross Society, Hobart.

Basutoland

- Maria Ntseki, Laundry Supervisor, Maseru Hospital, Basutoland.

Overseas Territories

- Hussein Mansur, Junior Assistant Adviser, Western Aden Protectorate.
- May Irma Ogle, lately Head Teacher, St. Matthias' School, Cabacaburi, British Guiana.
- Cleopatra Eugenia White, Rural Health Nurse, British Honduras.
- Amar Singh, Electrical Inspector, East African Railways and Harbours Administration.
- Naginder Singh, Senior Technical Officer, East African Posts and Telecommunications Administration.
- Chak Kuen Ho, Senior Male Nurse, Medical Department, Hong Kong.
- Ting Ho, Assistant Electrical Inspector, Hong Kong.
- Irene Banton, Parish Officer, Jamaica Social Welfare Commission, Jamaica.
- Wilson Karere Chege, lately Sergeant Major, Tribal Police, Kenya.
- Gervase Mbale Endeley, District Head and Chairman, Bakwerri Native Authority, Federation of Nigeria.
- Garba Katsina, Assistant Agricultural Superintendent, Ministry of Agriculture, Northern Region of Nigeria.
- Yiak Chiang Puah, Mandor of the Hock Teo Hing Coolies, Jesselton, North Borneo.
- Henry Mishek Chintu, African Administrative Assistant, Northern Rhodesia.
- Rebecca Mtshede, Matron, Mpili Girls Boarding School, Northern Rhodesia.
- Harvey Maxwell Makwati, Head Clerk, Provincial and District Administration, Blantyre, Nyasaland.
- Seyyid Ali Khalid Barghash, Senior Public Relations Assistant, Tanganyika.
- Samson Kimonga Musyanij, Geological Assistant, Geological Survey Department, Tanganyika.
- Sirjit Singh Virdi, Lithographic Draughtsman, Department of Lands & Surveys, Tanganyika.
- Beyeza Suluta, Head Attendant, Mulago Mental Hospital, Uganda.
- Rupert Elliot Gittens, Steward-Dispenser, Richmond Hill Institutions, Grenada, Windward Islands.
- Ada Williams, Home Sister, Nurses' Hostel, St. Vincent, Windward Islands.

=== Royal Victorian Medal (RVM) ===
In Silver

- Chief Petty Officer Steward William Clifford Allen, P/L.11727.
- Alfred Basham.
- George Philip Elliott.
- Henry George Gray.
- Harold William Halcoop.
- Arthur Halse.
- Chief Shipwright Artificer Sydney Walter Harris, P/MX.55901.
- Alice Maud Mary Kelly.
- James McGarthland.
- Edward John Frederick Morgan.
- Yeoman Sidney James Pearsall, OBE, Her Majesty's Bodyguard of the Yeoman of the Guard.
- Reginald George Henry Thatcher.
- Police Constable Robert Watson, Metropolitan Police.
- Albert George Wiles.

=== Royal Red Cross (RRC) ===
- Norah Maude Willoughby, ARRC, Principal Matron, Queen Alexandra's Royal Naval Nursing Service.
- Lieutenant-Colonel Margaret Betty Kneebone (206260), Queen Alexandra's Royal Army Nursing Corps.

==== Associate of the Royal Red Cross (ARRC) ====
- Nancy Helen Glew, Superintending Sister, Queen Alexandra's Royal Naval Nursing Service.
- Major Emma Hewie Litherland (213769), Queen Alexandra's Royal Army Nursing Corps.
- Major Joan Lilian Salmon (266676), Queen Alexandra's Royal Army Nursing Corps.
- Squadron Officer Irene May Turner (405516), Princess Mary's Royal Air Force Nursing Service.
- Flight Officer Ruth Massam (406620), Princess Mary's Royal Air Force Nursing Service.

=== Air Force Cross (AFC) ===
Royal Navy

- Lieutenant-Commander William Russell Hart.
- Lieutenant-Commander Derek John Whitehead, (Ret'd).

Royal Air Force

- Wing Commander William Michael Dixon, DSO, DFC (86390).
- Wing Commander John Eley Preston (33443).
- Wing Commander Clifford Scott Vos, DFC (42284).
- Squadron Leader George Bates, DFC (159878).
- Squadron Leader Donald Sydney Collier (163832).
- Squadron Leader Basil Hamilton, DFC (153452).
- Squadron Leader Glenn Kenneth Norman Lloyd (125536).
- Squadron Leader Bernard Thomas Millett (195578).
- Squadron Leader Herbert Minnis (57740).
- Squadron Leader Ronald William Payne (187433).
- Squadron Leader Patrick Dennis Collins Street, DSC (501011).
- Squadron Leader Arthur Henry Turner (193143).
- Flight Lieutenant James Wilfred Adams (57046).
- Flight Lieutenant Colin Henry Bidie (772776).
- Flight Lieutenant David Anthony Claude Marcel Comer, DFC (54616).
- Flight Lieutenant Milton James Cottee (022222), Royal Australian Air Force.
- Flight Lieutenant Kenneth John Dix (4031323).
- Flight Lieutenant Donald Eric Robert Lang (150755).
- Flight Lieutenant John Wellington Roll (123008).
- Flight Lieutenant David Robert Sowray (3040972).
- Flight Lieutenant Alfred Edward Sweeney (54909).
- Flight Lieutenant Owen John Thomas (523514).
- Flight Lieutenant Peter Thomas (3051144).
- Flying Officer Kenneth Ernest Appleford (1608448).
- Flying Officer Douglas Esmond Batten, DFM (153857).
- Flying Officer Frederick William Fielding (3051105).
- Master Pilot Alan Bruce Collins, AFM (1182475).
- Master Pilot Ian Robertson Craig (1387519).
- Master Pilot Kenneth Arthur McAllen (1333619).

==== Bar to Air Force Cross ====
- Wing Commander Ronald George Knott, DSO, DFC, AFC (39442).
- Squadron Leader John Harding Lewis, AFC (101513).
- Squadron Leader Ernest John Roberts, AFC (50609).

==== Second Bar to Air Force Cross ====
- Wing Commander Frank Leslie Dodd, DSO, DFC, AFC (89766).

=== Air Force Medal (AFM) ===
- 3003111 Flight Sergeant Lawrence Ernest Adlington.
- 3032772 Flight Sergeant Dennis Albert Brew.
- 3050862 Flight Sergeant William Alwyn Copley.
- 1393167 Flight Sergeant Ronald Thomas Emeny.
- 1891808 Flight Sergeant Charles William George Lusty.
- 1632169 Flight Sergeant Jack Eric Miller.

=== Queen's Commendation for Valuable Service in the Air ===
Royal Navy

- Lieutenant-Commander Nigel Neville Ducker, (Ret'd).
- Lieutenant-Commander Harry Graham Julian, DSC.

Royal Air Force

- Wing Commander Donovan Brent Gericke (39954)
- Acting Wing Commander Ronald Sidney Mortley, AFC (151292).
- Acting Wing Commander Edward Stephenson (135722).
- Squadron Leader Cedric Walter Clark (56187).
- Squadron Leader Gordon Douglas Cremer, AFC (122939).
- Squadron Leader John Walter Everitt (187782).
- Squadron Leader William Noel Gilmer, AFC (182613).
- Squadron Leader Edgar William Francis Hare (154287).
- Squadron Leader Keith Neville Haselwood (47271).
- Squadron Leader John Ernest Jacobs (154061).
- Flight Lieutenant John Skelton Bennett (1575773).
- Flight Lieutenant Filmer Bridgland (4082618).
- Flight Lieutenant John Goodwin Burns (3039497), (Ret'd).
- Flight Lieutenant Ronald Montgomery Crawford (193465).
- Flight Lieutenant Howard Currie (180137).
- Flight Lieutenant Eric Edward Fell (1179544).
- Flight Lieutenant Harold William Gumbrell (174113).
- Flight Lieutenant Cyril Leslie Houghton (162636).
- Flight Lieutenant James Roy Johnson (607324).
- Flight Lieutenant Richard Maclachlan (154753).
- Flight Lieutenant Edward Vernon Mellor (607092).
- Flight Lieutenant Barry Hamilton Newton (607353).
- Flight Lieutenant John Leslie Price (607120).
- Flight Lieutenant Christopher Bernard Sercombe (1604300).
- Flight Lieutenant Philip Basil Smith (583513).
- Flight Lieutenant Lionel Christopher Spargo, AFC (196249).
- Flight Lieutenant Bryan Adams Walesby Stobart (1869839).
- Flight Lieutenant John Francis Webster, DFC (51844).
- Flight Lieutenant Cyril Roy White (193511).
- Flying Officer Terence Maxwell Hamer, AFM (1584832).
- Flying Officer Denis Joseph Lowery (3040523).
- Flying Officer Ronald James Pritchard (4108932).
- Flying Officer Ronald Stephenson (650428).
- Master Pilot George Thomas Manson (1565849).

United Kingdom

- Captain Noel Rochfort Guyse Barker, Senior Captain, Second Class, British European Airways Corporation.
- Squadron Leader John Stanley Booth, DFC, Chief Test Pilot, Saunders-Roe Ltd.
- Captain Henry Lawrence Matthews Glover, Senior Captain, First Class, British Overseas Airways Corporation.
- Geoffrey Leonard Howitt, DFC, Test Pilot, Air Registration Board.
- Captain James Monro, Senior Captain, First Class, British European Airways Corporation.
- Captain Arthur Charles John Scadding, Senior Captain, First Class, British Overseas Airways Corporation.

Overseas Territories

- Captain Reinhold Ferdinand Caspareuthus, Staff Pilot, Directorate of Civil Aviation, East Africa.
- Captain Denis Walker Fenton, Chief Pilot and Operations Manager, Malayan Airways Ltd., Singapore.

=== Queen's Police Medal ===
England and Wales

- Colonel Thomas Eric St. Johnston, CBE, Chief Constable, Lancashire Constabulary.
- William Edward Watson, Chief Constable, Stoke-on-Trent City Police.
- Norman Lee, Assistant Chief Constable, Durham County Constabulary.
- Harold Wilfred Hawkyard, MBE, Commander, Metropolitan Police.
- Edward Leslie Chown, Chief Superintendent, Hampshire, Constabulary.
- George Alfred Carnill, Chief Superintendent, Sheffield City Police-.
- Henry Wonnacott Langman, Chief Superintendent, Devonshire Constabulary.
- Stanley Waller, Superintendent and Deputy Chief Constable, Rochdale Borough Police.
- Walter Johnson, Superintendent (Grade 1), Metropolitan Police.
- George James Prizeman, Superintendent (Grade 1), Metropolitan Police.
- William John O'Keeffe, Superintendent and Deputy Chief Constable, Southport Borough Police.

British Transport Commission

- Percy Landon Smith, MC, Chief of Police, London Transport Executive Police.

Scotland

- George Maclean, Chief Superintendent, City of Glasgow Police.
- Archibald Muir White, Superintendent, Fife Constabulary.

Northern Ireland

- John McNeill, Head Constable, Royal Ulster Constabulary.

Southern Rhodesia

- Major Ernest Hope Bunce, Provincial Criminal Investigation Officer of Matabeleland Province, British South Africa Police.

Overseas Territories

- Harry Conway, Superintendent of Police, Aden.
- John Robert Webster, Assistant Chief Constable, Cyprus.
- Roy Vincent Francis Turner, Assistant Commissioner of Police, Hong Kong.
- Lawrence Peter Reginald Browning, Deputy Commissioner of Police, Jamaica.
- Mervyn Douglas Alwyne Thomson, Assistant Commissioner of Police, Nyasaland.
- Parma Nand Joti, MBE, Assistant Superintendent of Police, Tanganyika.
- Morley Robert Dalrymple Langley, OBE, MVO, Senior Assistant Commissioner of Police, Uganda.
- Leslie Harold Brown, Assistant Commissioner of Police, Nigeria.

=== Queen's Fire Services Medal ===
England and Wales

- Kenneth Newcombe Hoare, Chief Officer, Manchester Fire Brigade.
- Sidney John Boissonade, BEM, Chief Officer, Coventry Fire Brigade.
- Edmund Swift Calvert, Chief Officer, Brighton Fire Brigade.
- Patrick Charles Short, Chief Officer, Eastbourne Fire Brigade.

Scotland

- John Wighton Gibson, OBE, Firemaster, Angus Area Fire Brigade.

State of New South Wales

- James Slavin McGrath, Chief Officer, New South Wales Fire Brigades.

Overseas Territories

- Robert Lofthouse, Territorial Fire Officer, Tanganyika.

=== Colonial Police Medal ===
Southern Rhodesia

- Robert John Vivian Bailey, Superintendent, British South Africa Police.
- Captain Robert Steele Cremer Bellamy, British South Africa Police.
- William Charles Greig, Staff Chief Inspector, British South Africa Police.
- Mafi, Station Sergeant, British South Africa Police.
- Mpofu, Second Class Sergeant, British South Africa Police.
- Captain John Cyprian Payne, British South Africa Police.
- John Richard Pestell, Superintendent, British South Africa Police.
- Peter, Detective Station Sergeant, British South Africa Police.

Swaziland

- Mark Ansell, Superintendent, Swaziland Police.

Overseas Territories

- Mohamed Abdalla, Sergeant, Kenya Police Force.
- Abrak s/o James, Sergeant Major, Tanganyika Police Force.
- Henry Francis Barrie, Deputy Superintendent, Aden Police Force.
- Baruti s/o Juma, Sergeant Major, Tanganyika Police Force.
- Augustine Joseph Belix, Inspector, Trinidad Police Force.
- Francis Eustace Bernard, Superintendent, Trinidad Police Force.
- Arthur Burns, Assistant Chief Constable, Cyprus Police Force.
- Eriya Buye, Head Constable, Uganda Police Force.
- Joseph Ebenezer Byron, Inspector (acting Assistant Superintendent), Leeward Islands Police Force.
- Albert Walker Cuffey, Assistant Superintendent, Sierra Leone Police Force.
- Hector Harold Donough, Inspector, Singapore Police Force.
- Robert Audley Patrick Herbert Dutton, DFC, Acting Assistant Chief Constable, Cyprus Police Force.
- Eu Cheow Bang, Superintendent, Singapore Police Force.
- John Njide Ezeadiugwu, Assistant Superintendent, Nigeria Police Force.
- Joseph Fuller, Sergeant Major, Nigeria Police Force.
- Kenneth Robin Thornton Goodale, Assistant Superintendent, Kenya Police Force.
- John James Tawse Greig, Inspector, Cyprus Police Force.
- Kemal Hifzi, Sub-Inspector, Cyprus Police Force.
- Alexander Byron Hunte, Station Sergeant, Leeward Islands Police Force.
- Jonathan Inyalyo, Assistant Superintendent, Uganda Police Force.
- John Desmond Irwin, Assistant Superintendent, Kenya Police Force.
- Oliver Pardew Sylvester Jones, MC, Senior Superintendent, Nigeria Police Force.
- Maurice William Joplin, Assistant Superintendent, Kenya Police Force.
- Osman Shariff Kamara, Sub-Inspector, Sierra Leone Police Force.
- John Kasagira, Head Constable, Uganda Police Force.
- Samuel Katana, Acting Chief Inspector, Kenya Police Force.
- Sadari Lal, Assistant Superintendent, Tanganyika Police Force.
- Gerald Lawrence Eric Lindow, Senior Superintendent, Nigeria Police Force.
- Louis Maxwell Mackey, Senior Superintendent, Nigeria Police Force.
- O'Neil Newsam McIntosh, Assistant Superintendent, St. Vincent Auxiliary Police Force.
- Hamman Maiduguri, Assistant Superintendent, Nigeria Police Force.
- Mohamed Khan Meherban Khan, Assistant Superintendent, Aden Police Force.
- John Reginald Middleton, Superintendent, Jamaica Police Force.
- Cornelius Audi Nyawanga, Inspector, Kenya Police Force.
- Hyacinth Ohanu, Assistant Superintendent, Nigeria Police Force.
- Louis Payas, Chief Inspector, Gibraltar Police Force.
- Edward Norman Peirce, Superintendent, Cyprus Police Force.
- George Lincoln Reid, Assistant Superintendent, Leeward Island s Police Force.
- George Matthias Roberts, Acting Inspector, Leeward Islands Police Force.
- Rennie Rollo, Superintendent, Nigeria Police Force.
- Gideon Saini, Assistant Inspector, Nyasaland Police Force.
- Yorro Sangari, Inspector, Sierra Leone Police Force.
- Nicolas Savvides, Sub-Inspector, Cyprus Police Force.
- Manuel Seeneevasagum, Assistant Superintendent, Mauritius Police Force.
- Sefu s/o Selemani, Sergeant Major, Tanganyika Police Force.
- Harold Stanley Sell, Superintendent, Fiji Police Force.
- Silibelo, Detective Sergeant Major, Northern Rhodesia Police Force.
- Bachan Singh, Inspector, Singapore Police Force.
- Tang Tin, Staff Sergeant, Hong Kong Police Force.
- Douglas Haig Taylor, Superintendent, Hong Kong Police Force.
- Dennis Croft Thomas, Superintendent, Tanganyika. Police Force.
- Godfrey Ukpong, Assistant Superintendent, Nigeria Polic e Force.
- James Udoekim Usen, Sub-Inspector, Nigeria Police Force.
- Tarachand Vedi, Chief Inspector, Kenya Police Force.
- Albert Harry White, Superintendent, Cyprus Police Force.
- George Edward Willerton, Chief Inspector, Hong Kong Police Force.
- Patrick Wizu, Sergeant, Nigeria Police Force.
- Jeffrey Dew Colin York, Superintendent, Nyasaland Police Force.

== Australia ==
=== Knight Bachelor ===
- Kenneth Hamilton Bailey, CBE, Solicitor-General to the Commonwealth of Australia and Secretary, Attorney-General's Department.
- John Carew Eccles, FRACP, of Canberra. For services to physiological research.
- Benjamin Thomas Edye, CBE, ChM, FRCS, of Sydney. For services to Medicine.
- Alexander James Reid, CMG, ISO, Member of the Commonwealth of Australia Grants Commission.

=== Order of the Bath ===
==== Companion of the Order of the Bath (CB) ====
Military Division

- Major-General Robert Joseph Henry Risson, CBE, DSO, ED (1/10000), Citizen Military Forces.

=== Order of Saint Michael and Saint George ===
==== Knight Grand Cross of the Order of St Michael and St George (GCMG) ====
- The Right Honourable Sir Arthur William Fadden, KCMG, Federal Treasurer, and lately Deputy Prime Minister, Commonwealth of Australia.

==== Companion of the Order of St Michael and St George (CMG) ====
- James Ralph Darling, OBE, of Geelong, Victoria. For services to Education.
- George Gordon Gooch, of Dalkeith, Western Australia. For public and philanthropic services.
- Samuel Hordern, OBE, President, Royal Agricultural Society of New South Wales.

=== Order of the British Empire ===
==== Knight Commander of the Order of the British Empire (KBE) ====
Military Division

- Air Marshal Frederick Rudolph William Scherger, CB, CBE, DSO, AFC, Royal Australian Air Force.

==== Commander of the Order of the British Empire (CBE) ====
Military Division

- Commodore Edwin Allan Good, Royal Australian Navy.
- Major-General (temporary) James William Harrison, OBE (3/67), Australian Staff Corps.
- Air Commodore Frank Headlam, OBE, Royal Australian Air Force.

Civil Division

- The Reverend George Calvert Barber, Professor of Theology, Queen's College, Melbourne.
- David William Brisbane, of Peppermint Grove, Western Australia. For public services.
- Allan Douglas McKnight, Secretary, Department of the Army.
- Malcolm Stewart Moore, of Hawthorn, Victoria. For public services.
- Hugh Richard Weir, OBE, of Roseville, New South Wales. For service to amateur athletics.

==== Officer of the Order of the British Empire (OBE) ====
Military Division

- Acting Commander Arnold Holbrook Green, DSC, Royal Australian Navy.
- Lieutenant-Colonel Edward Francis Mullin (2/166323), Royal Australian Engineers (Supplementary Reserve).
- Colonel Douglas Vincent (1/3), Australian Staff Corps.
- Lieutenant-Colonel Ernest Walter Weate, ED (3/37660), Australian Staff Corps.
- Group Captain Jack William Charles Black, Royal Australian Air Force.
- Group Captain Roy Brasmere Davis, MB, BS, Royal Australian Air Force.

Civil Division

- Charles Harold Bushby, of Launceston, Tasmania. For public services.
- Robert Richmond Campbell, of Rose Park, South Australia. For services to Art.
- Alexander Hugh Chisholm, of Cremorne Point, New South Wales, in recognition of his contribution to Australian literature.
- Clyde Edwin Clements, a past President of the Automobile Association of Australia. For public services.
- Alice Ishbel Hay Creswick, of Toorak, Victoria. For services to the pre-school movement in Australia.
- Hugh Gordon Dash, Press Secretary to the Prime Minister of the Commonwealth of Australia.
- Stevenson Fountain, DCM, lately Director, Posts and Telegraphs, South Australia, Postmaster-General's Department, Commonwealth of Australia.
- The Reverend Cecil Frank Gribble, Secretary of the Board of the United Church in North Australia.
- Colin Oswald Healey, of Sydney. For services to Education.
- Gilbert George Jewkes, lately Director of the Pharmaceutical Benefits Section, Department of Health.
- Dorothy Isabel Knox, of Pymble, New South Wales. For services to Education.
- Ronald Max Levenger, JP, Honorary State Secretary of the New South Wales Division of the Air Force Association.
- Ronald Bannatyne Lewis, Director of Engineering, Commonwealth Department of Works.
- Gertrude Amy Roseby, of Willoughby, New South Wales, in recognition of her work in many spheres of educational activity.
- Eric Scott, Federal President of the Federated Pharmaceutical Service Guild of Australia.
- Gertrude Adeline Siegele, of Perth, Western Australia, in recognition of her services to Nursing.
- Herbert Philip Weymouth, Chairman and General Manager of the Australian Shipbuilding Board.

==== Member of the Order of the British Empire (MBE) ====
Military Division

- Lieutenant-Commander (SD) Cyril Herbert Paine, Royal Australian Navy.
- 2/2017 Warrant Officer Class I Eric Leslie Richard Barwick, Royal Corps of Australian Electrical and Mechanical Engineers.
- Captain Hector Manley Fox (1/8023), Australian Staff Corps.
- Captain-Norman Harry Harden (4/19301), Royal Australian Corps of Signals.
- 2/75726 Warrant. Officer Class II Norman Ronald Harries, Royal Australian Infantry Corps.
- Major (Quartermaster) Harcourt Leonard Hartnett (2/64), Royal Australian Artillery.
- Major Leslie Irvine Hopton (4/7509), Australian Staff Corps.
- Captain (temporary) Thomas Surrey Talbot (2/70944), Royal Australian Infantry Corps.
- 4/832 Warrant Officer Class II Francis John Tuomr, Royal Australian Engineers.
- Squadron Leader Bruce Albeit Bretherton, DFC (035545), Citizen Air Force.
- Squadron Leader Thomas Lloyd Walkley, DFM (02110), Royal Australian Air Force.
- Warrant Officer Percy Douglas Stanley Hollands (A34511), Royal Australian Air Force.

Civil Division

- The Reverend Friedrich Wilhelm Albrecht, of Alice Springs, Northern Territory. For services in promoting the welfare of the aboriginals of Central Australia.
- Cecilia Catherine Berry, of Trundle, New South Wales. For services to the Australian Red Cross Society.
- Godfrey Jacob Marshall Best, of Longueville, New South Wales. For services to the Boy Scouts Movement.
- Montague Bloom, of Brisbane, Queensland. For services to charitable organisations.
- James Frederick Buckley, of Woody Point, Queensland. For services to blinded ex-servicemen and their dependants.
- Alexander Belford Christison, of Bexley, New South Wales. For services to Music.
- Una Elizabeth Clift, President of the New South Wales Ladies Golf Union and a past President of the Australian Ladies Golf Union.
- Thomas Joseph Collins, lately Secretary of the Federal Executive Council.
- The Reverend Mother Mary Alphonsus Daly (Mother Mary Alphonsus), of Derby, Western Australia. For services to the Nursing profession.
- Francis Henry Farrar, of Bexley, New South Wales. For services in civic and ecclesiastical fields.
- Noel Edwin Forster, of Adelaide, formerly Honorary Chairman of the Woomera Store Board.
- John Goulston, of Bellevue Hill, New South Wales. For public and social welfare services.
- Ethel May Hahn, of Fremantle, Western Australia. For devoted service to the welfare of Australian aborigines.
- Leslie Herbert Irwin, of Blacktown, New South Wales. For services to the community.
- Charles Frederick Thomas Jackson, of Port Kembla, New South Wales. For services to the Boy Scouts' Movement.
- Sherman Alexander Jones, of Earlwood, New South Wales. For public services.
- William Robert McFerrran, a member of the Australian Advertising Council.
- Alice Maude Mofflin, of Mount Lawley, Western Australia. For services rendered to young people under the auspices of the Methodist Youth Organisations.
- Edith May Monk, of Strathfield, New South Wales. For services to the Voluntary Aid Detachment of the Australian Red Cross Society.
- Richard Stuart Nesbitt, of Melbourne. For public services.
- Victor James O'Grady, JP, of Boulder, Western Australia. For services to returned soldiers and their dependants.
- Donald Charles Pittman, of Penshurst, New South Wales. For services to the road transport industry.
- Norman Richardson, of Rockhampton, Queensland. For services to the community, particularly in the interests of ex-servicemen.
- Raymond Joseph Rosenberg, JP, of Double Bay, New South Wales. For social welfare services.
- John Ryder, of Ivanhoe, Victoria. For services to Australian cricket.
- Harold Marshall Smith, of Muswellbrook, New South Wales. For services to ex-servicemen and women.
- Alice Mabel May Stuckey, JP, of Croydon, New South Wales. For charitable services.
- Florence Sulman, of Collaroy, New South Wales. For services in the promotion of child welfare.
- Jessie, Marion Todd, of Griffith, New South Wales. For social welfare services.
- Malvena Maude Tomkins, of Fivedock, New South Wales. For services in the interests of ex-members of the Armed Forces.
- Gildas Rosslyn Clive Wise, of Newport, Victoria, in recognition of his contribution to technical training in civil aviation in Australia.
- William George Wright, Controller Mail Exchange Branch, Central Office, Postmaster-General's Department, Melbourne.

=== Companion of the Imperial Service Order (ISO) ===
Australian Civil Service

- Robert Harold Fyfe, lately Assistant Director-General of Social Services, Melbourne.
- John Arnold Neale, OBE, Deputy Commissioner of Taxation (Income Tax), Victoria.

=== British Empire Medal (BEM) ===
Military Division

- Chief Shore Wireless Operator Walter Ronald McLeod, R.12879, Royal Australian Navy.
- 5/3173 Sergeant George Joseph Bonser, Royal Australian Army Service Corps.
- 2/1580 Staff-Sergeant (temporary) Eric William Boyd, Royal Australian Army Service Corps.
- 3/73618 Staff-Sergeant Francis John Higgins, Royal Australian Infantry Corps.
- 5/1841 Warrant Officer Class II (temporary) Albert Hurtle Morphett, Royal Australian Infantry Corps.
- 3/45571 Warrant Officer Class II (temporary) Francis William Seedsman, Royal Australian Army Service Corps.
- A251 Flight Sergeant Robert Henry Walford, Royal Australian Air Force.
- A2141 Sergeant Matthew Charles William Booth, Royal Australian Mr Force.
- A21779 Corporal Lewis Farrugia, Royal Australian Air Force.

Civil Division

- Campbell Stanley Banks, Senior Tarmac Foreman, Trans-Australian Airlines, Victoria.
- Reginald Allan Pearson, Car Driver, Department of Supply.

=== Air Force Cross (AFC) ===
- Flight Lieutenant David Brendon Brennan (021991), Royal Australian Air Force.
- Flight Lieutenant George Churchard Turnnidge (033814), Royal Australian Air Force.

== Ghana ==
=== Order of the Bath ===
==== Companion of the Order of the Bath (CB) ====
Military Division

- Major-General Alexander George Victor Paley, CBE, DSO (23862), late Infantry, General Officer Commanding, Ghana Army.

=== Order of the British Empire ===
==== Commander of the Order of the British Empire (CBE) ====
Military Division

- Brigadier (temporary) Philip Henry Cecil Hayward (41169), late Infantry; seconded to the Ghana Army.

Civil Division

- Alfred Eggleston, Governor of the Bank of Ghana.

==== Officer of the Order of the British Empire (OBE) ====
Civil Division

- Hamish Millar-Craig, Permanent Secretary, Ministry of Finance.
- Kenneth Moseley Francis, Government Statistician.
- Alasdair McKelvie, MB, ChB, lately Specialist Leprologist, Ministry of Health.
- Roland James Moxon, Director of Information Services.
- Archibold Frank Dallyn Seale, Assistant Director of Public Works, Public Works Department.

==== Member of the Order of the British Empire (MBE) ====
Military Division

- 2652957 Warrant Officer Class I (acting) James Noel Gordon Bennett, MM, Coldstream Guards; seconded to the Ghana Army.
- Major Malcolm Wilfred Andrew Carswell (72375), Royal Regiment of Artillery; seconded to the Ghana Army.
- The Reverend Daniel Martin Spraggon, Chaplain to the Forces, Fourth Class, (417746), Royal Army Chaplains Department; seconded to the Ghana Army.

Civil Division

- Captain Percy Eric Hamilton, Comptroller, Government House.
- Donald Airth Smith, formerly Principal Education Officer, Ministry of Education.

=== Companion of the Imperial Service Order (ISO) ===
Ghana Civil Service.

- Alistair Foggie, Chief Conservator of Forests.

=== British Empire Medal (BEM) ===
Civil Division

- James Twaddle, Senior Works Superintendent, Public Works Department.

=== Queen's Police Medal ===
- Major Albert Gardner Ames, Assistant Commissioner of Police, Ghana.

== Federation of Rhodesia and Nyasaland ==
=== Knight Bachelor ===
- The Honourable Henry John Clayden, a Judge of the Federal Supreme Court.

=== Order of Saint Michael and Saint George ===
==== Companion of the Order of St Michael and St George (CMG) ====
- Leslie Manfred Noel Hodson, OBE. For public services to the Federation, especially in the cause of the University College of Rhodesia and Nyasaland.
- Richard Murchison Morris, OBE, MD, Federal Secretary for Health.

=== Order of the British Empire ===
==== Commander of the Order of the British Empire (CBE) ====
Civil Division

- Evan Roy Campbell. For services to the tobacco industry of the Federation.
- Wilfred Hamilton McCleland, JP, a Director of the Bank of Rhodesia and Nyasaland, and President of the Associated Chamber of Commerce of Rhodesia and Nyasaland.

==== Officer of the Order of the British Empire (OBE) ====
Civil Division

- Michael Hamilton Barry. For services rendered in connection with social welfare and patriotic organisations in the Federation.
- Brigadier Cyril Ralph Major, Federal Military Forces (Retired). For public services to the Federation.
- William Stewart Parker, Principal Private Secretary to the Federal Prime Minister.
- John Hywell Neville Parry, a member of the staff of the Federal Broadcasting Corporation.

==== Member of the Order of the British Empire (MBE) ====
Military Division

- Squadron Leader Harold James Pringle (0079), Royal Rhodesian Air Force.

Civil Division

- William Leslie Bonny, a bridge engineer employed by the Rhodesia Railways, Federation of Rhodesia and Nyasaland.
- Florence Beatrice Furnell, Private Secretary to the Federal Minister of Finance.
- Dennis Sabin Johnston, a Probation and Welfare Officer, Federal Prisons Department.
- Helen Kelly, formerly Senior Assistant, Federal Broadcasting Service.
- Dorothy Clara Margaret McIntosh, Permanent Representative in Cape Town of the Federal Department of External Affairs.
- James White Miller, formerly Immigration Attaché at the Federal High Commissioner's Office in London.
- Frederick John William Thorn, formerly Principal of the Training Centre, Rhodesia Railways, Federation of Rhodesia and Nyasaland.
- Lawrence Chinyani Vambe. For services to journalism in the Federation.

=== British Empire Medal (BEM) ===
Military Division

- ZBK/668 Platoon Warrant Officer Mutale Kaluba, The Northern Rhodesia Regiment.
- DN/30728 Warrant Officer Class II Graciano Mateyo, The King's African Rifles.
