= Dice (disambiguation) =

Dice are polyhedral objects used in games for generating random numbers.

Dice or DICE may also refer to:

== Music ==
=== Musicians ===
- Dice (Australian band), an Australian band, formed in 2020
- Dice (rapper), American rapper
- Dice (Thai group), a Thai boy band under Tada Entertainment

=== Releases ===
- Dice (album), a 1989 comedy album by Andrew Dice Clay
- Dice (EP), 2022 EP by Onew
- "Dice" (Finley Quaye song), 2004
- "Dice" (Flow song), 2021
- "Dice" (hide song), 1994
- "Dice" (Onew song), 2022
- "Dice" (Nmixx song), 2022 song by Nmixx
- "Dice", a song by Band-Maid on their album World Domination
- "Dices", the Spanish version of Selena Gomez & the Scene's 2011 single, "Who Says (Selena Gomez & the Scene song)"

== Television ==
- Dice (TV miniseries), a live-action miniseries
- Dice (TV series), a 2016 sitcom
- Dice: Undisputed, a 2007 American reality show
- D.I.C.E., a 2005 animated series
- "Dice" (The Cape), a 2011 episode

== Information technology ==
- DICE (compiler), a C compiler for Amiga
- DICE (DEA database), a DEA database, consists largely of phone log and Internet data
- DICE model (Dynamic Integrated Climate-Economy model), a computer model of climate change
- Digital invoice customs exchange, a revenue protection idea developed to prevent tax evasion methods
- Dual interlocked storage cell, an implementation of a radiation-hardened memory cell; see KOMDIV-32
- Dynamic intelligent currency encryption, an AI-controlled security technology for banknote and asset systems
- Dice-Sørensen coefficient, a statistic used to gauge the similarity of two samples

== Businesses and organizations ==
- Dice (ticketing company), a live music discovery and ticketing company
- DICE (company), formally known as EA Digital Illusions CE, a Swedish video game developer
- Dice.com, a career website
- Durrell Institute of Conservation and Ecology in the United Kingdom

== Other uses ==
- Dice (surname), a list of people with the name
- Dice (horse) (1925–1927), an American Champion Thoroughbred racehorse
- Dice (G.I. Joe), a fictional ninja in the G.I. Joe universe
- Dice, Kentucky, an unincorporated community in Perry County, Kentucky, US
- DICE framework – Duration, Integrity, Commitment, and Effort framework. A framework aiming for consistency in evaluating various projects with subjective inputs and can be used to track and manage portfolios of projects.
- D.I.C.E. Summit, an annual gathering of executives from the video game industry
  - D.I.C.E. Awards, an annual video game awards show
- DICE trials, biological warfare tests in the UK
- Defense-Independent Component ERA, a baseball statistic
- DICE, Drumian Carbon Isotope Excursion

== See also ==
- Die (disambiguation)
- Dyce (disambiguation)
