= Dies =

Dies may refer to:

- Death, the process of dying
- Dies (deity), the Roman counterpart of the Greek goddess Hemera, the personification of day, daughter of Nox (Night) and Erebus (Darkness).
- Dies (surname), a surname of Dutch, Flemish, and Frisian origin
- Die (integrated circuit), when used plurally
- Misspelling of Dice

== See also ==
- Die (disambiguation)
