= Bradbury Wilkinson and Company =

British security printing company

- Native name: Bradbury, Wilkinson & Co
- Company type: Security printing company
- Industry: Security printing
- Founded: 1850s (began printing banknotes in 1856)
- Founder: Henry Bradbury
- Defunct: 1990
- Fate: Acquired by American Bank Note Company (1903); Acquired by De La Rue (1986); Operations closed by De La Rue (1990)
- Headquarters: Holborn, London (1873–1917); New Malden, Surrey (1917–1990), United Kingdom
- Products: Banknotes; Postage stamps; Share certificates

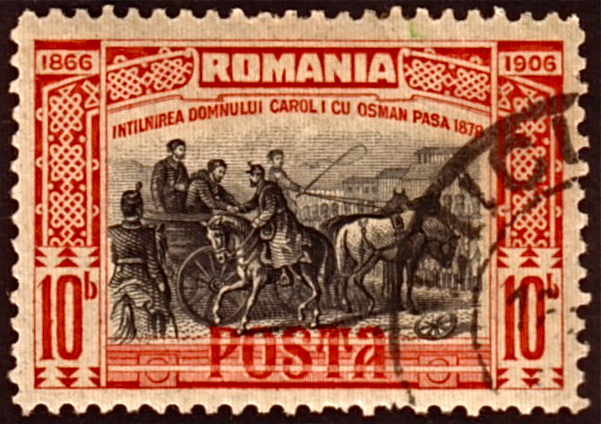
1906 Romanian stamp printed by Bradbury, Wilkinson

Bradbury Wilkinson & Co were an English engraver and printer of banknotes, postage stamps and share certificates.

== History ==
The original company was established in the 1850s by Henry Bradbury and begun printing banknotes in 1856. Bradbury then died in 1860. In 1873–74, the firm built an imposing six-storey workshop, for engraving printing plates, in Holborn, London at 25 and 27 Farringdon Road, which is now a Grade II-listed building.

The company printed the first series of the Imperial Bank of Persia banknotes that were issued in 1890.

In 1903, the company was acquired by the American Bank Note Company. In 1917, it moved to New Malden in Surrey still operating as Bradbury-Wilkinson as a wholly owned subsidiary of ABNC.

Seychelles 50 rupee banknote circa 1971 featuring Queen Elizabeth II and the hidden word "sex" to the right.

In 1983, Bradbury Wilkinson created a form of polymer banknote using Du Pont's Tyvek material; this was marketed as Bradvek and used to print 1-pound banknotes for the Isle of Man. In 1986 the company was acquired by De La Rue. The site is now occupied by the Shannon Corner Tesco supermarket. The last Bradbury Wilkinson plant was shut down by De La Rue in 1990.

In 2015 a Seychelles 50 rupee banknote (worth £2.50 or $4), originally issued between 1968 and 1973, featuring Queen Elizabeth II and covertly depicting the word sex, was sold at auction in the UK for £336 (around $500). Many think Bradbury Wilkinson's engraver Brian Fox put it in.

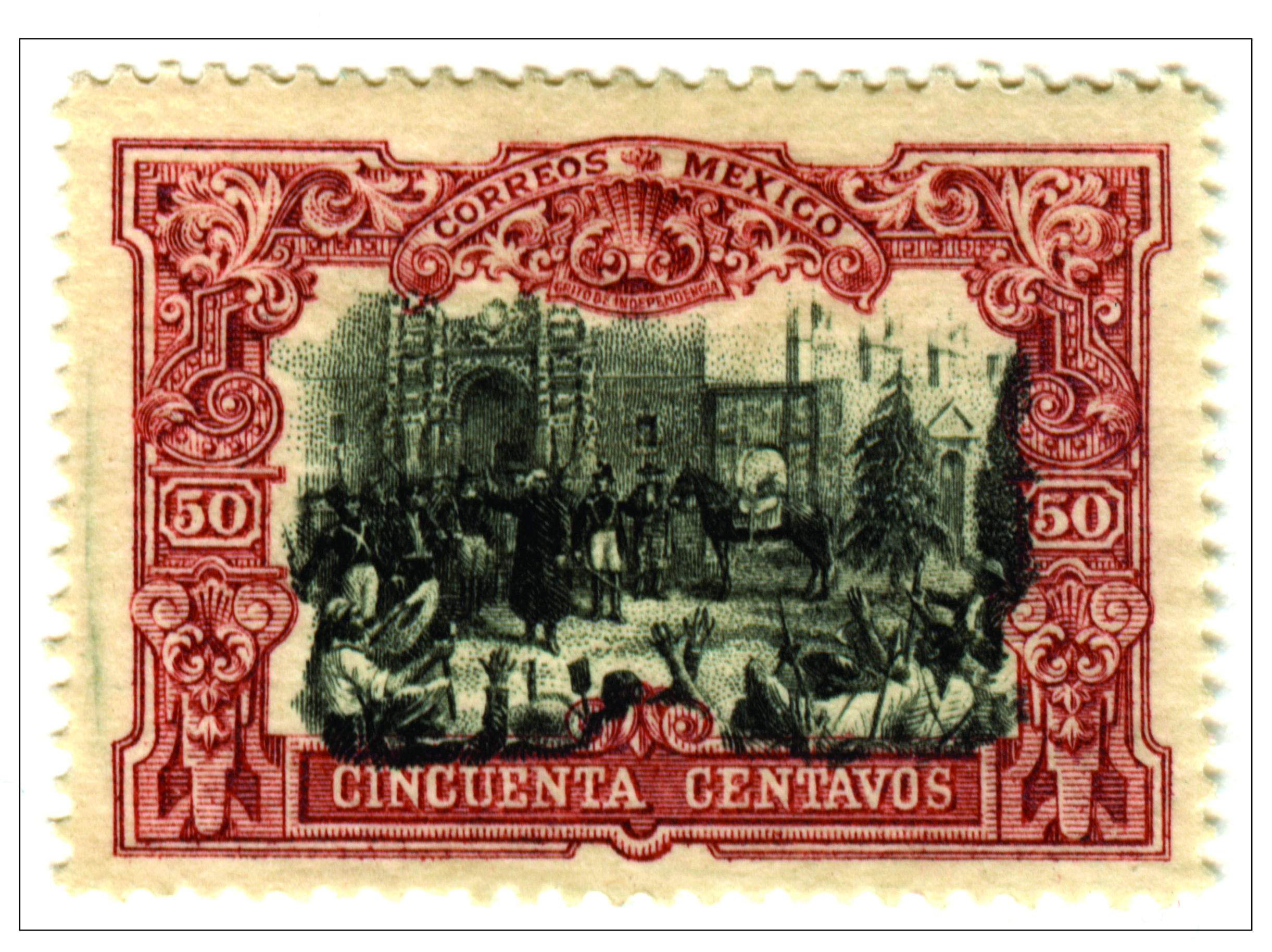
Stamp Mexico, Centennial of Independence, 1910 date of first issue, printed by Bradbury Wilkinson and Company, classified according to the Scott Catalogue 2009 A44 Vol. 4 pag. 895 and according to the Mexican philatelic collection. Scanned copy from the philatelic collection of the Fonseca Padilla family, Jalisco, Mexico.
