= Dice (surname) =

Dice is an English surname, originating from the Middle English dyse or dyce (meaning dice, chance, or luck), likely applied as a nickname for a habitual dice player.

Notable people with the name include:

- Lee R. Dice (1887–1977), American ecologist and geneticist

Stage name

- Loco Dice (born 1974), Tunisian DJ and electronic music producer
- Mark Dice (born 1977), American YouTuber
- Parah Dice, Turkish-German record producer
- Tom Dice (born 1989), Belgian singer-songwriter
- Zicky Dice, American professional wrestler

== See also ==
- Dice (disambiguation)
