= Banknote =

Paper money issued by a bank

A banknote or bank note – also called a bill (North American English) or simply a note – is a type of paper money that is made and distributed ("issued") by a bank of issue, payable to the bearer on demand. Banknotes were originally issued by commercial banks, which were legally required to redeem the notes for legal tender (usually gold or silver coin) when presented to the chief cashier of the originating bank. These commercial banknotes were only traded at face value in the market served by the issuing bank. Commercial banknotes have primarily been replaced by national banknotes issued by central banks or monetary authorities.

By extension, the word "banknote" is sometimes used (including by collectors) to refer more generally to paper money, but in a strict sense notes that have not been issued by banks, e.g. government notes, are not banknotes.

National banknotes are often, but not always, legal tender, meaning that courts of law are required to recognize them as satisfactory payment of money debts. Historically, banks sought to ensure that they could always pay customers in coins when they presented banknotes for payment. This practice of "backing" notes with something of substance is the basis for the history of central banks backing their currencies in gold or silver. Today, most national currencies have no backing in precious metals or commodities and have value only by fiat. Except for non-circulating high-value or precious metal issues, coins are used for lower-value monetary units, while banknotes are used for higher values.

== Issue of banknotes ==
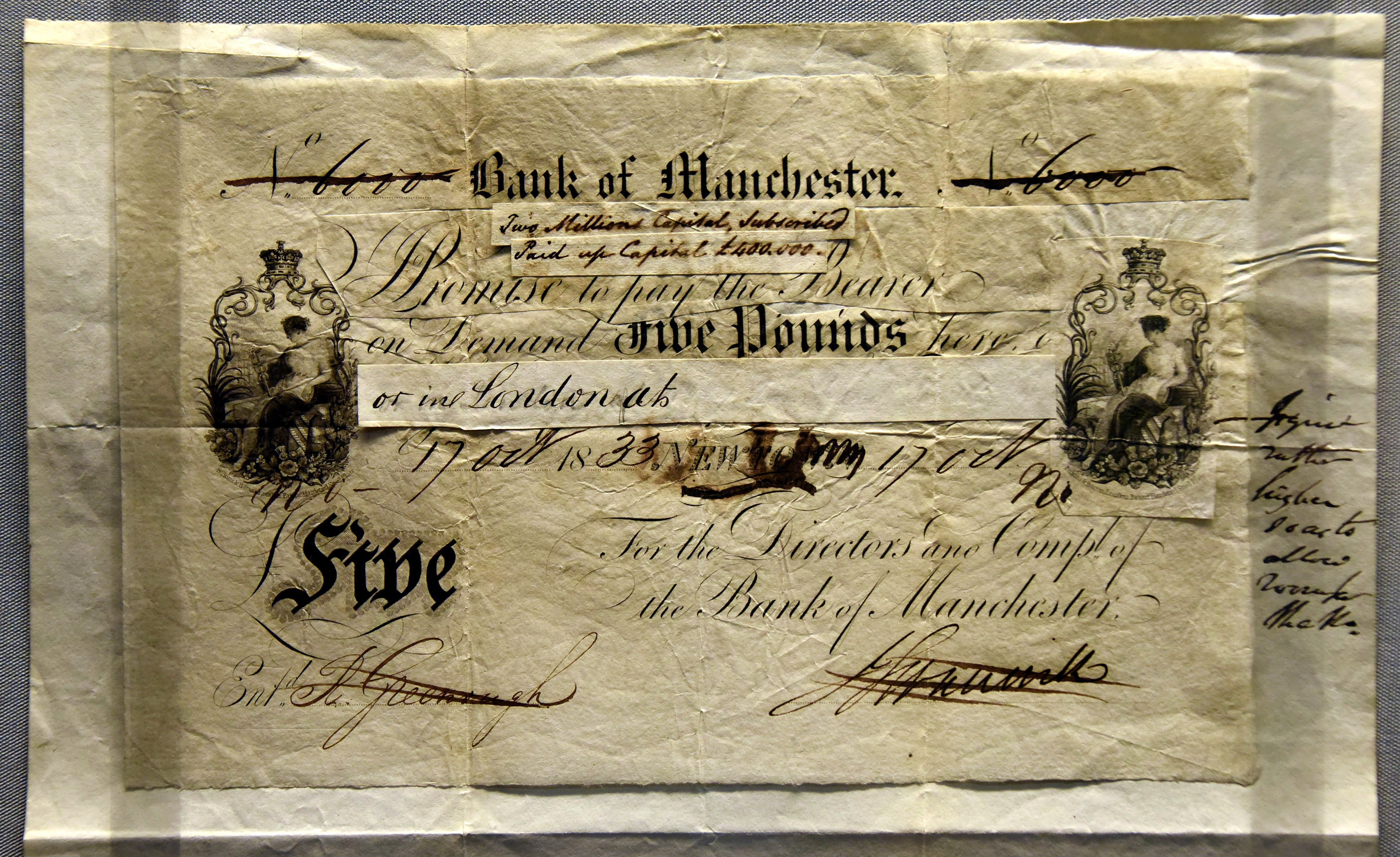
Collage for banknote design with annotations and additions to show proposed changes (figure rather higher so as to allow room for the No.), Bank of Manchester, UK, 1833. On display at the British Museum in London

Today, a central bank or treasury is generally solely responsible within a state or currency union for the issue of banknotes. However, this is not always the case, and historically, private banks frequently handled all of a country's paper currency. Thus, many different banks or institutions may have issued banknotes in a given country. Commercial banks in the United States had legally issued banknotes before there was a national currency; however, these became subject to government authorization from 1863 to 1932. In the last of these series, the issuing bank would stamp its name and promise to pay, along with the signatures of its president and cashier on a preprinted note. By this time, the notes were standardized in appearance and not too different from Federal Reserve Notes.

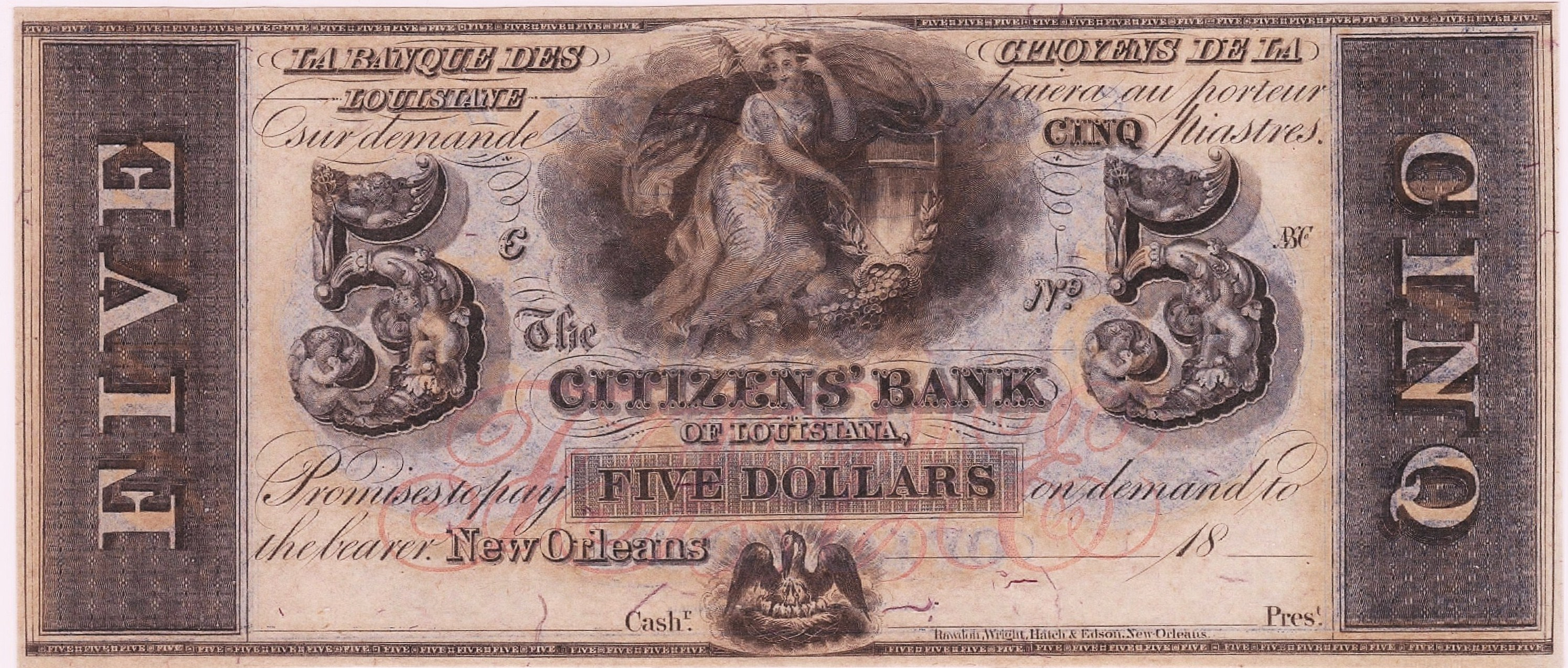
A $5 note issued by Citizens Bank of Louisiana in the 1850s.

In a small number of countries, private banknote issuing continues to this day. For example, in the United Kingdom, certain commercial banks in Scotland and Northern Ireland continue to print their own banknotes for domestic circulation, even though they are not fiat money or declared in law as legal tender anywhere. The UK's central bank, the Bank of England, prints notes which are legal tender in England and Wales; these notes are also usable as money (but not legal tender) in Scotland and Northern Ireland (see Banknotes of the pound sterling). The Bank of Scotland was the first bank in Europe to successfully print its own paper banknotes, and entered circulation in 1696. The Bank of Scotland is currently the longest continuous issuer of banknotes in the world.

In the two special administrative regions of the People's Republic of China, arrangements are similar to those in the UK; in Hong Kong, three commercial banks are licensed to issue Hong Kong dollar notes, and in Macau, banknotes of the Macanese pataca are issued by two different commercial banks. In Luxembourg, the Banque Internationale à Luxembourg was entitled to issue its own Luxembourgish franc notes until the introduction of the Euro in 1999.

As well as commercial issuers, other organizations may have note-issuing powers; for example, until 2002, the Singapore dollar was issued by the Board of Commissioners of Currency, Singapore, a government agency that was later taken over by the Monetary Authority of Singapore.

As with any printing, there is also a chance for banknotes to have printing errors. For U.S. banknotes, these errors can include board break errors, butterfly fold errors, cutting errors, dual denomination errors, fold over errors, and misalignment errors.

== Materials used for banknotes ==
=== Paper banknotes ===
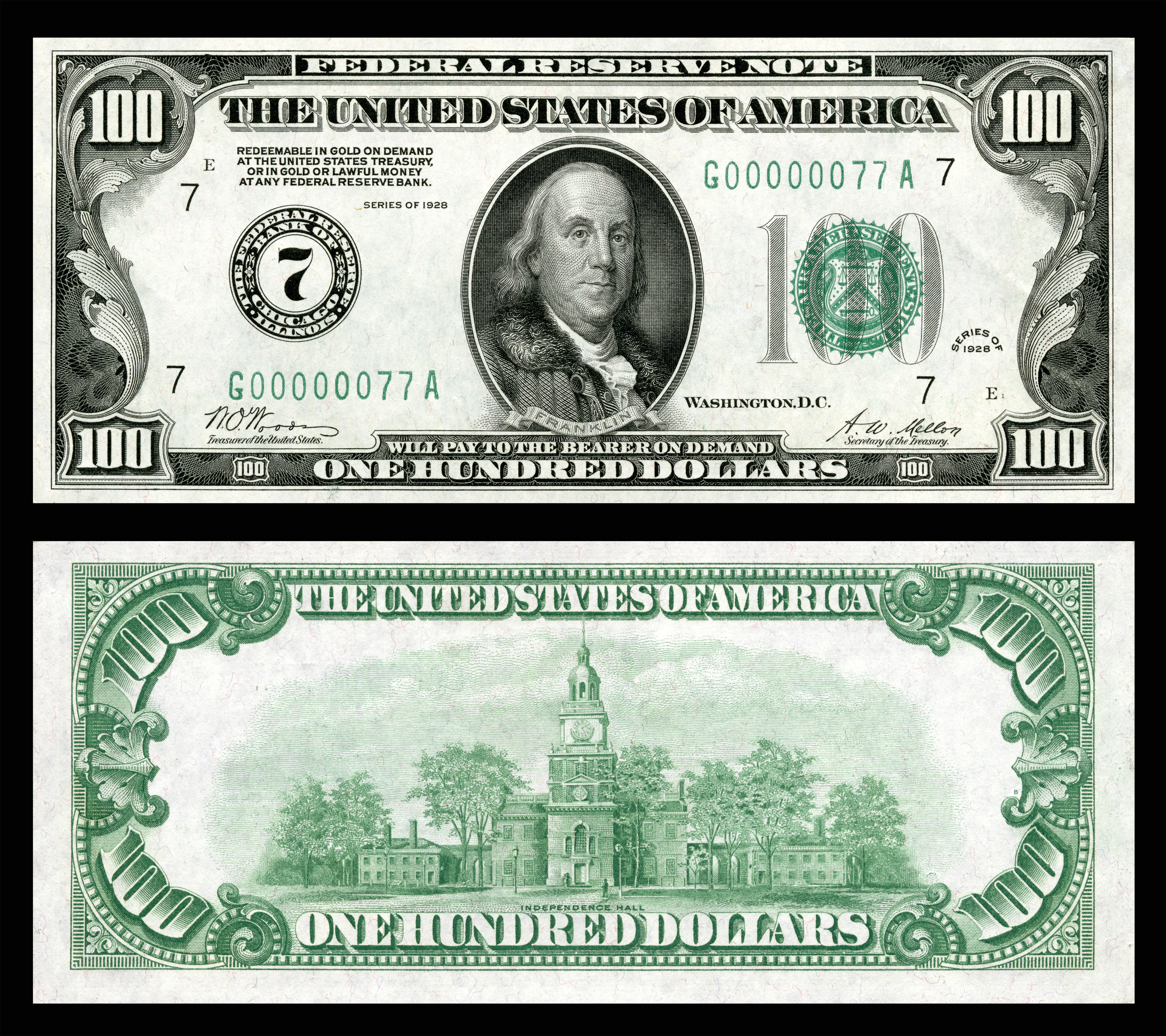
Obverse and reverse of an old American $100 note (1928)

Until recently, most banknotes were made from cotton paper with a weight of 80 to 90 grams per square meter. The cotton is sometimes mixed with linen, abaca, or other textile fibres. Generally, the paper used is different from ordinary paper: it is much more resilient, resists wear and tear (the average life of a paper banknote is two years), and also does not contain the usual agents that make ordinary paper glow slightly under ultraviolet light. Unlike most printing and writing paper, banknote paper is infused with polyvinyl alcohol or gelatin, instead of water, to give it extra strength. Early Chinese banknotes were printed on paper made of mulberry bark. Mitsumata (Edgeworthia chrysantha) and other fibers are used in Japanese banknote paper (a kind of Washi).

Most banknotes are made using the mould-made process, in which a watermark and thread are incorporated during the paper forming process. The thread is a simple-looking security component found in most banknotes. It is, however, often rather complex in construction, comprising fluorescent, magnetic, metallic, and microprint elements.By combining it with watermarking technology, the thread can be made to surface periodically on one side only. This is known as a windowed thread and further increases the counterfeit resistance of the banknote paper. This process was invented by Portals, part of the De La Rue group in the UK. Other related methods include watermarking to reduce the number of corner folds by strengthening this part of the note. Varnishing and coatings reduce the accumulation of dirt on the note for longer durability in circulation.

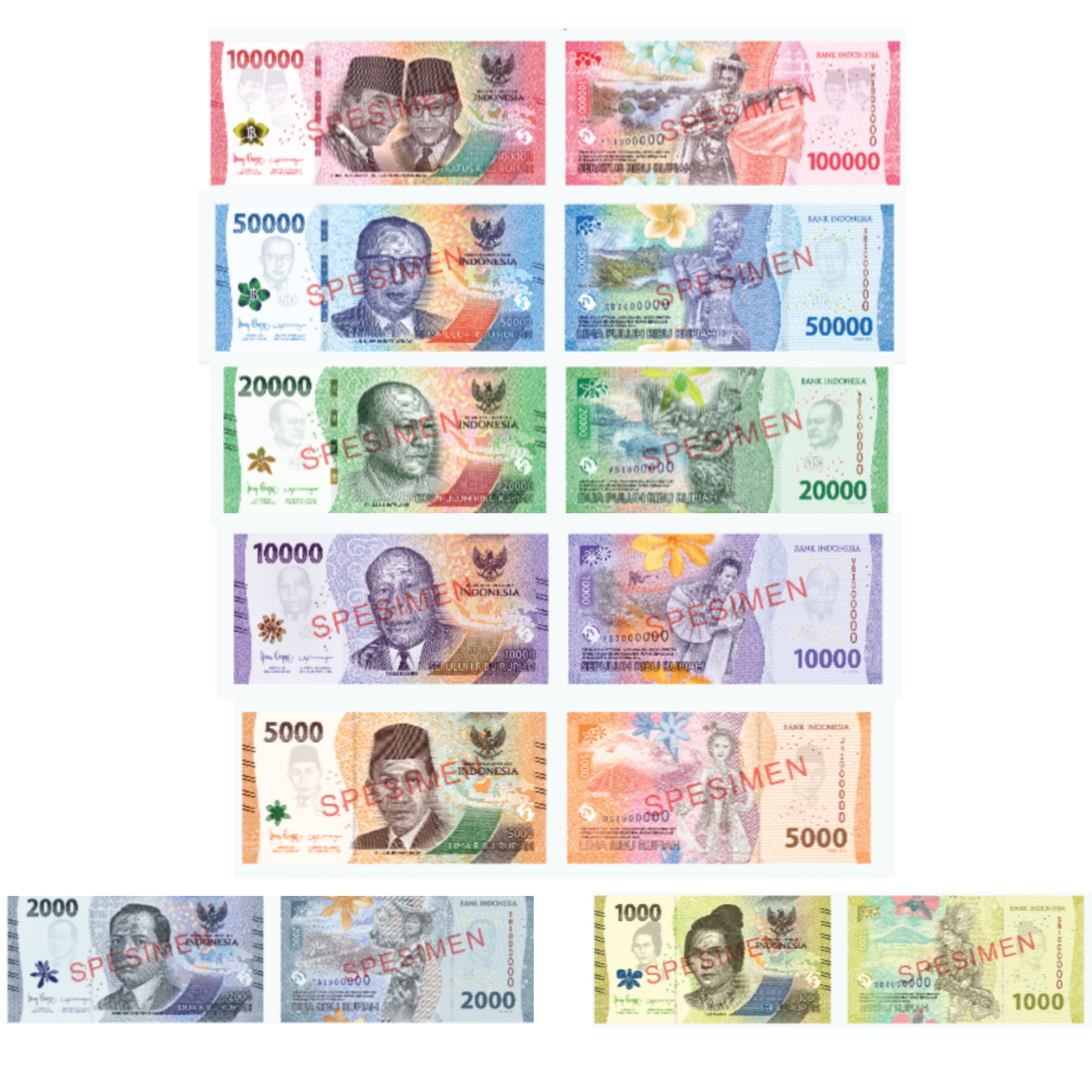
Many currencies, such as the Indonesian rupiah, vary the sizes of their banknotes by denomination. This is done so that they may be told apart through touch alone.

Another security feature is based on windows in the paper, which are covered by holographic foils to make it very hard to copy. Such technology is applied as a portrait window for the higher denominations of the Europa series (ES2) of the euro banknotes. Windows are also used with the Hybrid substrate from Giesecke+Devrient which is composed of an inner layer of paper substrate with thin outer layers of plastic film for high durability.

=== History of counterfeiting and security measures ===
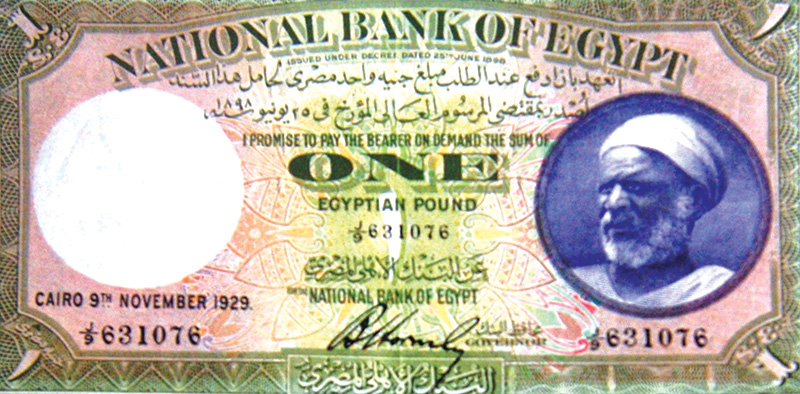
Obverse of the 1929 issue of E£1 banknote showing a photo of an Egyptian citizen

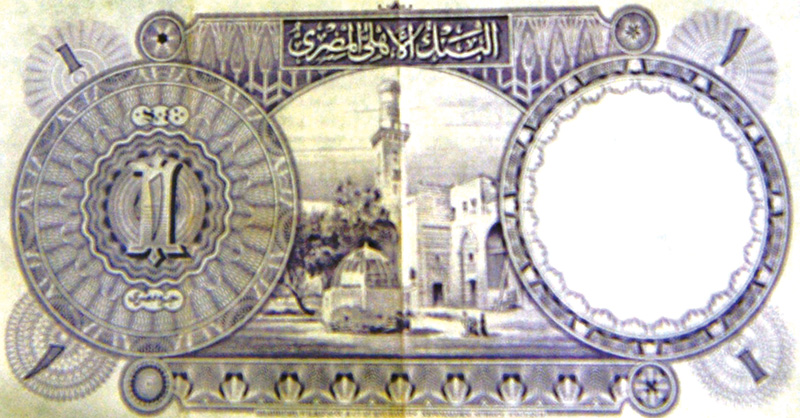
Reverse of the 1929 issue of E£1 banknote

When paper banknotes were first introduced in England, they resulted in a dramatic rise in counterfeiting. The attempts by the Bank of England and the Royal Mint to stamp out currency crime led to new policing strategies, including the increased use of entrapment.

The characteristics of banknotes, their materials and production techniques (as well as their development over history) are topics that are not usually thoroughly examined by historians, even though there are now a number of works detailing how banknotes were actually constructed. This is mostly because historians tend to be more interested in a theoretical understanding of how money worked rather than how it was produced. The first great deterrent against counterfeiting was the death penalty for forgers, but this was not enough to stop the rise of counterfeiting. Over the 18th century, far fewer banknotes were circulating in England compared to the boom of banknotes in the 19th century; because of this, improved note-making techniques were not considered a compelling issue.

In the 18th century, banknotes were produced mainly by copper-plate engraving and printing, and they were single-sided. Note-making technologies remained largely unchanged during the 18th century. The first banknotes were produced by intaglio printing: this involved engraving a copper plate by hand and then covering it in ink to print the banknotes. Only with this technique, at that time, could one force the paper into the lines of the engraving to make suitable banknotes. Another difficulty in counterfeiting banknotes was the paper, as the type of paper used for banknotes was rather different from the paper commercially available at that time. Despite this, some forgers successfully forged notes by dealing with and consulting paper makers, in order to make a similar kind of paper themselves. Furthermore, watermarked paper has also been used since banknotes first appeared; it involved the sewing of a thin wire frame into paper mould. Watermarks for notes were first used in 1697, by Rice Watkins, a Berkshire paper maker. Watermarks and special paper made it harder and more expensive to forge banknotes, since more complex and expensive paper-making machines were needed.

In the early 19th century (the so-called Bank Restriction Period, 1797–1821), the dramatically increased demand for banknotes slowly forced the banks to refine the technologies employed. In 1801, watermarks, which previously were straight lines, became wavy—an idea of William Brewer, a watermark mould maker. This made counterfeiting banknotes harder still, at least in the short term, and in 1803 the number of forged banknotes fell to just 3000, compared to 5000 the previous year. Banks asked skilled engravers and artists to help them make their notes more difficult to counterfeit during the same time period, which historians refer to as "the search for the inimitable banknote." During this time, banknotes also began to be double-sided and have more intricate patterns.

The ease with which paper money can be created, by both legitimate authorities and counterfeiters, has led to a temptation in times of crisis such as war or revolution, or merely a spendthrift government, to produce paper money which was not supported by precious metal or other goods; this often led to hyperinflation and a loss of faith in the value of paper money, e.g. the Continental Currency produced by the Continental Congress during the American Revolution, the Assignats produced during the French Revolution, the paper currency produced by the Confederate States of America and the individual states of the Confederate States of America, the financing of World War I by the Central Powers (by 1922 1 gold Austro-Hungarian krone of 1914 was worth 14,400 paper Kronen), the devaluation of the Yugoslav dinar in the 1990s, etc. Banknotes may also be overprinted to reflect political or economic changes that occur faster than new currency can be printed.

In 1988, Austria produced the 5000 Schilling banknote (Mozart), which is the first foil application (Kinegram) to a paper banknote in the history of banknote printing. The application of optical features is now common throughout the world. Many countries' banknotes now have embedded holograms.

=== Polymer banknotes ===
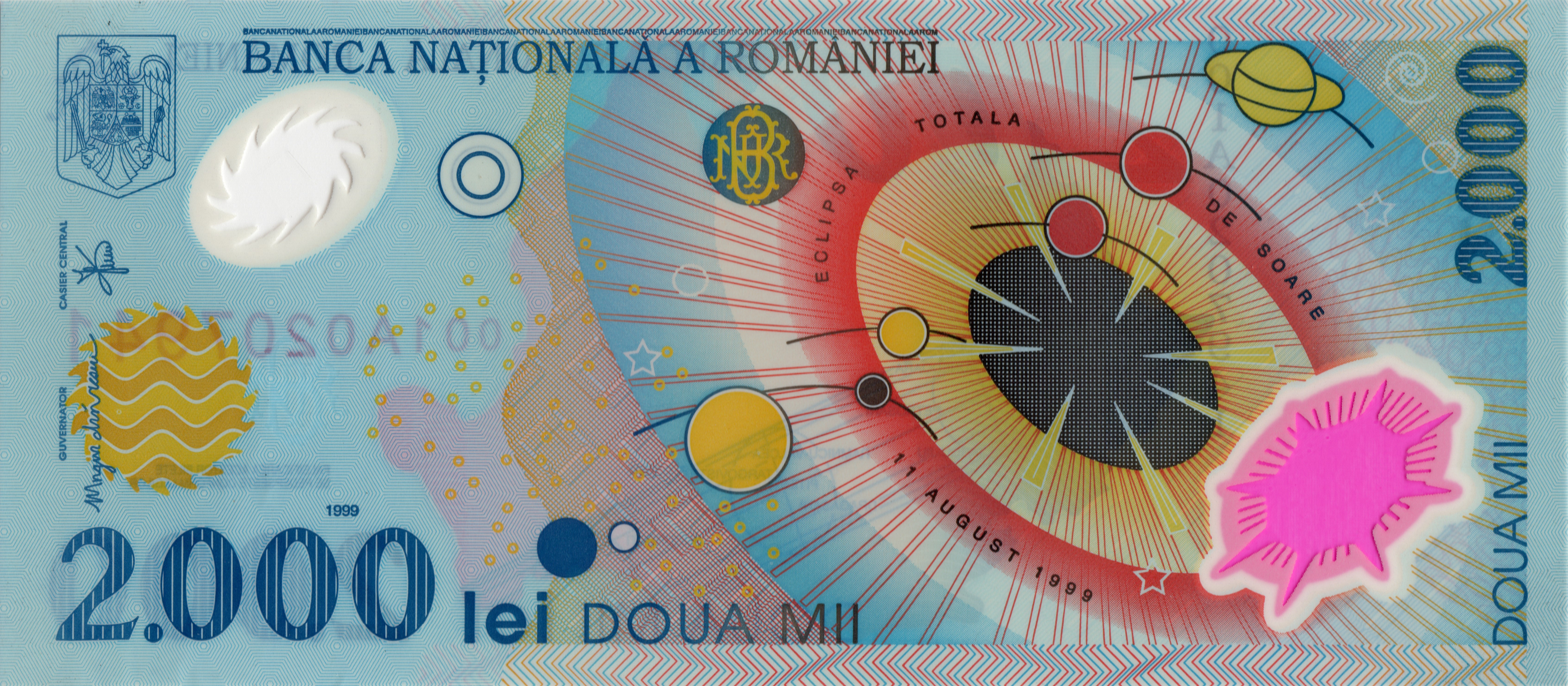
A 2000 Romanian lei polymer banknote

In 1983, Costa Rica and Haiti issued the first Tyvek and the Isle of Man issued the first Bradvek polymer (or plastic) banknotes; these were printed by the American Banknote Company and developed by DuPont. These early plastic notes were plagued with issues such as ink wearing off, and they were discontinued. In 1988, after significant research and development in Australia by the Commonwealth Scientific and Industrial Research Organisation (CSIRO) and the Reserve Bank of Australia, Australia produced the first polymer banknote made from biaxially-oriented polypropylene (plastic), and in 1996, Australia became the first country to have a full set of circulating polymer banknotes of all denominations, completely replacing its paper banknotes. Since then, many other countries have adopted circulating polymer banknotes, including Bangladesh, Brazil, Brunei, Canada, Chile, Guatemala, Dominican Republic, Hong Kong SAR (China), Indonesia, Israel, Malaysia, Mexico, Nepal, New Zealand, Nigeria, Papua New Guinea, Paraguay, the Philippines, Saudi Arabia, Romania, Samoa, Singapore, the Solomon Islands, Thailand, Trinidad and Tobago, the United Arab Emirates, the United Kingdom, Uruguay, Vietnam, and Zambia. Other countries have issued commemorative polymer notes, including China, Kuwait, the Northern Bank of Northern Ireland, the Bank of Scotland in Scotland, and Taiwan. In 2005, Bulgaria issued the world's first hybrid paper-polymer banknote.

Polymer banknotes were developed to improve durability and prevent counterfeiting through incorporated security features, such as optically variable devices that are extremely difficult to reproduce.

=== Other materials ===
Over the years, a number of materials other than paper have been used to print banknotes. This includes various textiles, including silk, and materials such as leather.

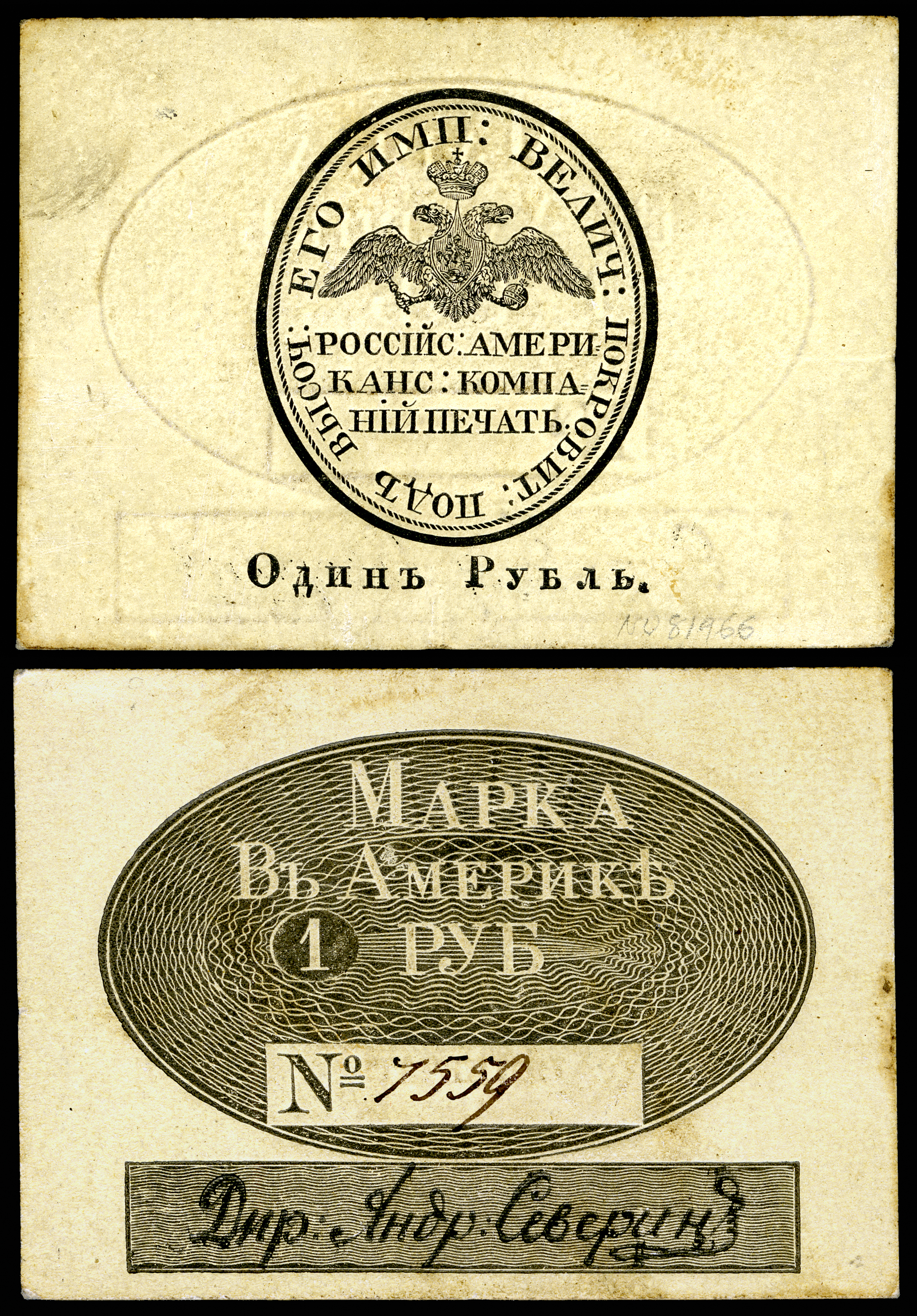
Russian American Company-issued Alaskan parchment scrip (c. 1852)

Silk and other fibers have been commonly used in the manufacture of various banknote papers, intended to provide both additional durability and security. Crane and Company patented banknote paper with embedded silk threads in 1844 and has supplied paper to the United States Treasury since 1879. Banknotes printed on pure silk "paper" include "emergency money" Notgeld issues from a number of German towns in 1923 during a period of fiscal crisis and hyperinflation. Most notoriously, Bielefeld produced a number of silk, leather, velvet, linen and wood issues. These issues were produced primarily for collectors, rather than for circulation. They are in demand by collectors. Banknotes printed on cloth include a number of Communist Revolutionary issues in China from areas such as Xinjiang, or Sinkiang, in the United Islamic Republic of East Turkestan in 1933. Emergency money was also printed in 1902 on khaki shirt fabric during the Boer War.

Cotton fibers, together with 25% linen, are the material of the banknotes in the United States. Leather banknotes (or coins) were issued in a number of sieges, as well as in other times of emergency. During the Russian administration of Alaska, banknotes were printed on sealskin. A number of 19th-century issues are known in Germanic and Estonia, including the places of Dorpat, Pernau, Reval, Werro, and Woiseck. In addition to the Bielefeld issues, other German leather Notgeld from 1923 is known from Borna, Osterwieck, Paderborn and Pößneck.

Other issues from 1923 were printed on wood, which was also used in Canada in 1763–1764 during Pontiac's Rebellion, and by the Hudson's Bay Company. In 1848, in Bohemia, wooden checkerboard pieces were used as money.

Even playing cards were used for currency in France in the early 19th century, and in French Canada from 1685 until 1757, the Colony of Louisiana, Dutch Guiana, and in the Isle of Man at the beginning of the 19th century, and again in Germany after World War I.

Most recently, Bisphenol S (BPS) has been frequently used in the production of banknotes worldwide. BPS is an endocrine disruptor that is subject to human dermal absorption through handling banknotes.

=== Vertical orientation ===
Vertical currency is a type of currency in which the orientation has been changed from the conventional horizontal orientation to a vertical orientation. In 2010, Dowling Duncan, a multidisciplinary design studio, conducted a study in which they determined people tend to handle and deal with money vertically rather than horizontally, especially when the currency is processed through ATM and other money machines. They also note how money transactions are conducted vertically, not horizontally. Bermuda, Cape Verde, the Organisation of Eastern Caribbean States, Switzerland, and Venezuela have adopted vertically oriented currency, though Cape Verde has now reverted to horizontal orientation.

Since 1979, Sri Lanka has printed the reverse of its banknotes vertically. Between 1993 and 2013, Brazil printed banknotes of 5000 and 50000 cruzeiros reais and the first Brazilian real series of banknotes has the obverse in traditional horizontal layout, while the reverse is in vertical format. The 2018 Hong Kong dollar banknotes series also has the obverse in traditional horizontal layout, while the reverse is in vertical format.

Early Chinese banknotes were also vertical, due to the direction of Chinese writing.

The 2018 Canadian $10 bill featuring a portrait of Canadian civil rights pioneer Viola Desmond is presented in a vertical format. The Northern Irish £5 and £10 notes issued by Ulster Bank for 2019 were also presented in this way.

== Vending machines and banknotes ==
In the late 20th century, vending machines were designed to recognize banknotes of smaller values long after they were designed to recognize coins distinct from slugs. This capability has become essential in economies where inflation has not been followed by the introduction of progressively larger coin denominations (such as the United States, where several attempts to make dollar coins popular in general circulation have largely failed). The existing infrastructure of such machines presents one of the difficulties in changing the design of these banknotes to make them less counterfeitable, that is, by adding additional features so easily discernible by people that they would immediately reject banknotes of inferior quality, for every machine in the country would have to be updated.

== Destruction ==
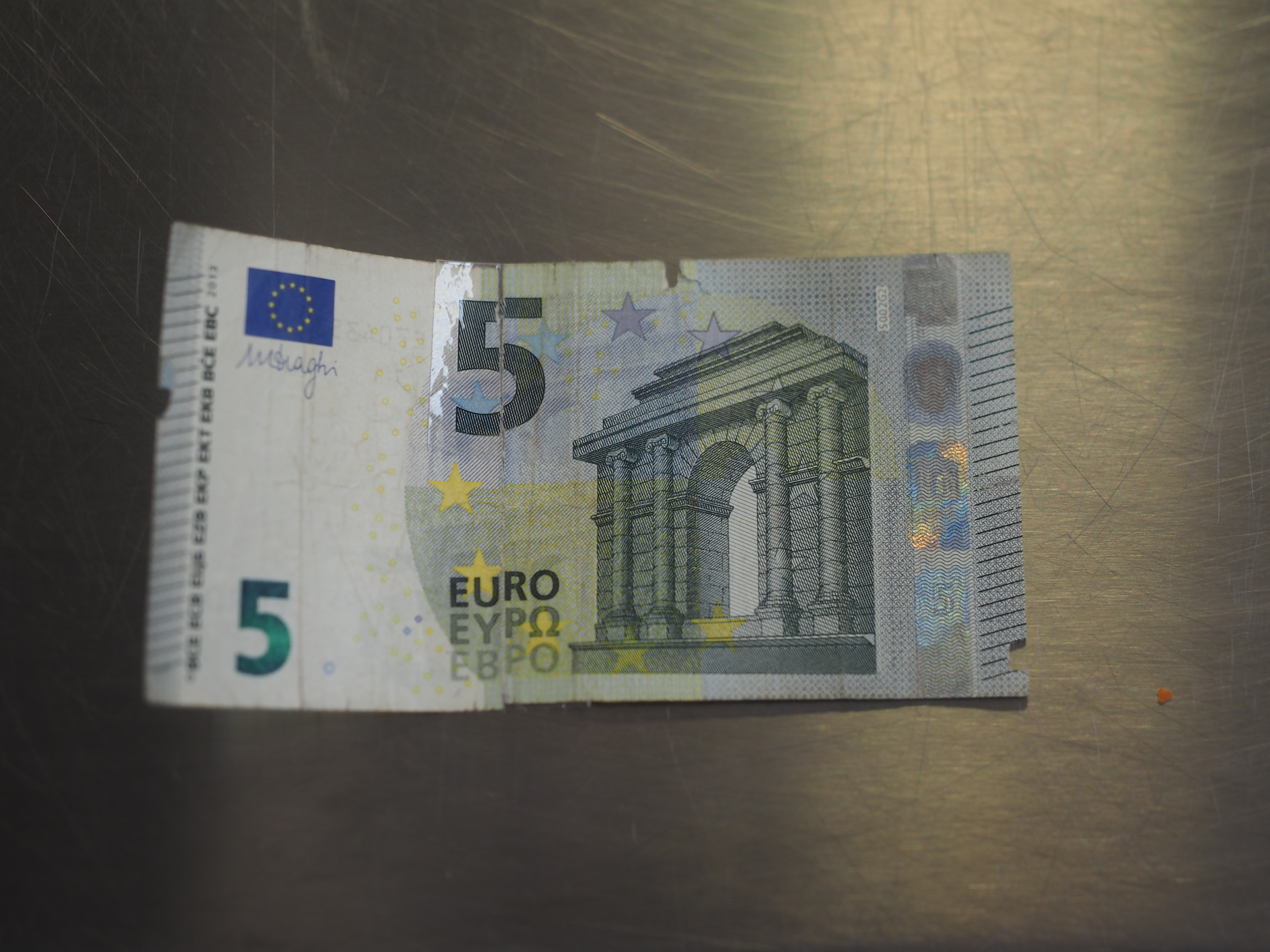
A 5 euro note that was repaired with plastic tape after being torn in half

A banknote is removed from circulation because of everyday wear and tear from its handling. Banknotes are passed through a banknote sorting machine to assess their authenticity and fitness for circulation, or may be classified unfit for circulation if they are worn, dirty, soiled, damaged, mutilated or torn. Unfit notes are returned to the central bank for secure online destruction by high-speed banknote sorting machines using a cross-cut shredder device similar to a paper shredder with security level P-5 (pieces smaller than 30 mm^{2}) according to the standard DIN 66399–2. This small size decomposes a banknote into typically more than 500 tiny pieces and rules out reconstruction like a jigsaw puzzle because the shreds from many banknotes are commingled.

A subsequent briquettor compresses shredded paper material into a small cylindrical or rectangular form for disposal (e.g. landfill or burning). Before the 1990s, unfit banknotes were destroyed by incineration, with a higher risk of manipulations.

When a Federal Reserve Bank of the United States receives a cash deposit from a commercial bank or another financial institution, it checks the individual notes to determine whether they are fit for future circulation. About one-third of the notes that the Fed receives are unfit, and the Fed destroys them. US dollar banknotes last an average of more than five years.

Contaminated banknotes are also decommissioned and removed from circulation, primarily to prevent the spread of diseases. A Canadian government report indicates:

Types of contaminants include: notes found on a corpse, stagnant water, contaminated by human or animal body fluids such as urine, feces, vomit, infectious blood, fine hazardous powders from detonated explosives, dye pack and/or drugs...

In the US, the nickname "Fed Shreds" refers to paper money which has been shredded after becoming unfit for circulation. Although these shredded banknotes are generally landfilled, they are sometimes sold or given away in small bags as souvenirs or as briquettes. Since 2012, the Federal Reserve Bank of St. Louis has also donated shredded banknotes to local farms for use in composting.

Polymer banknotes may be shredded and then melted down and recycled to form plastic products like building components, plumbing fittings, or compost bins.

Shredded Banknotes

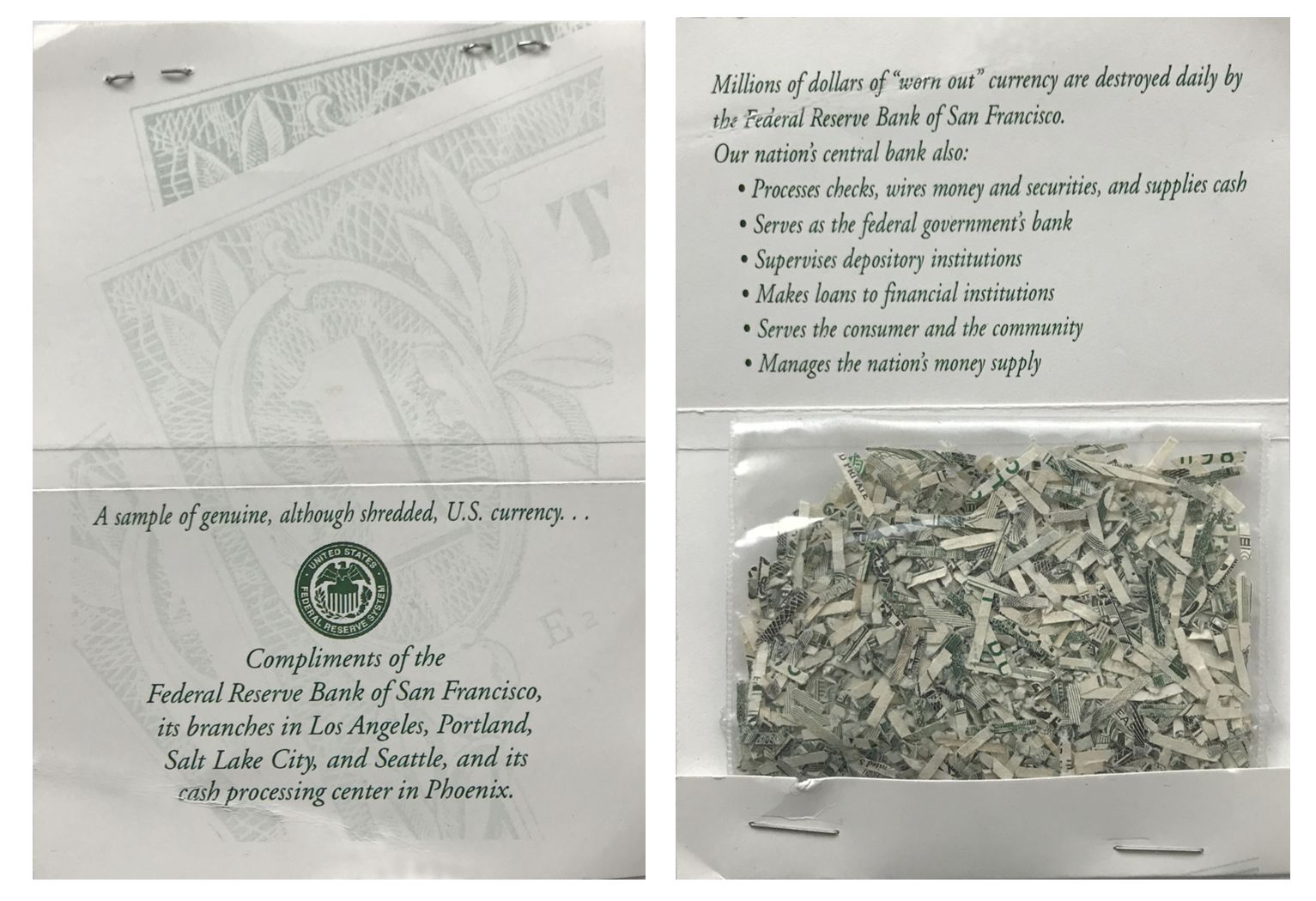
Fed Shreds as souvenir from the Federal Reserve Bank of San Francisco

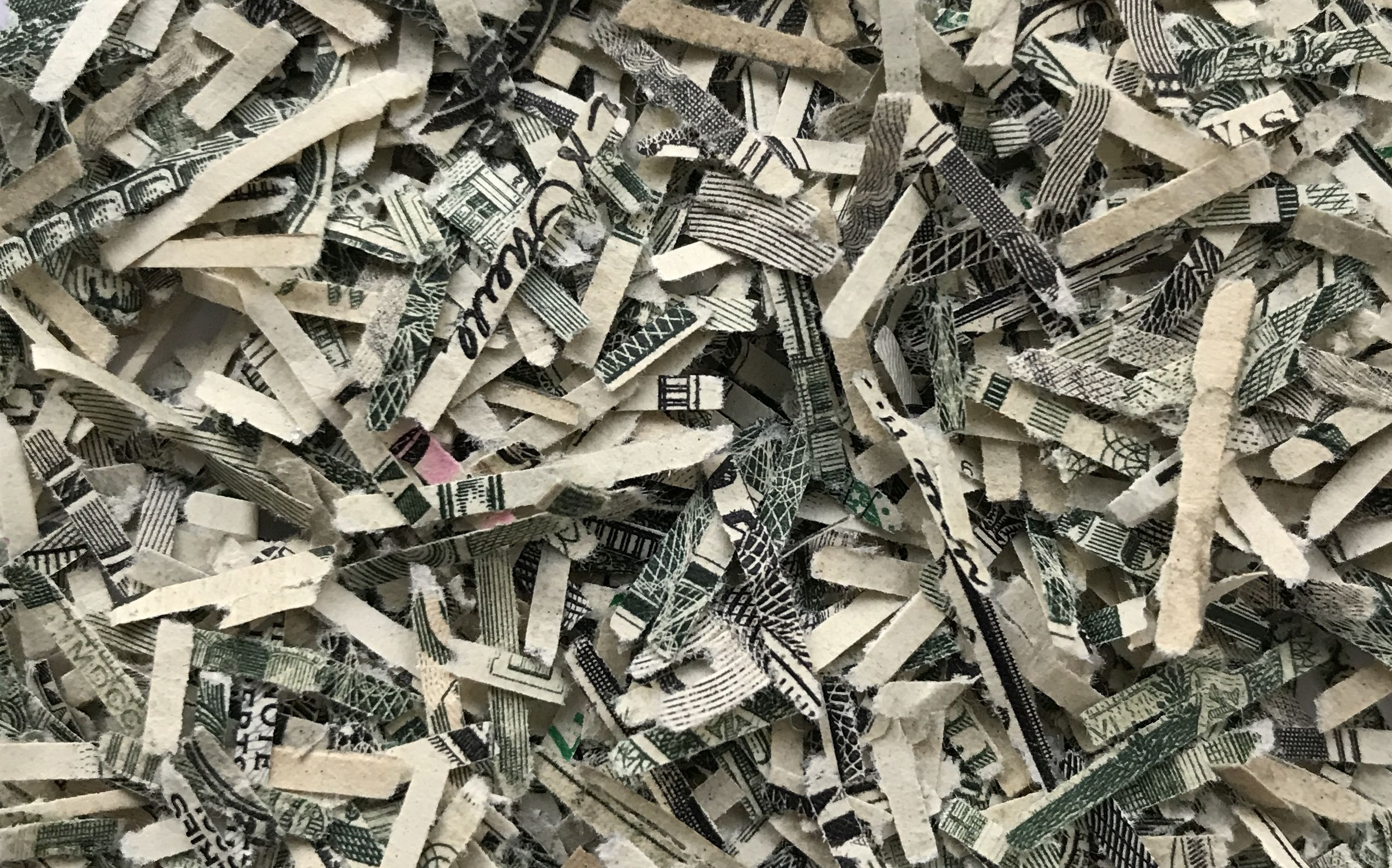
Shreds of unfit US dollar notes with a typical size of less than 1.5 mm × 16 mm

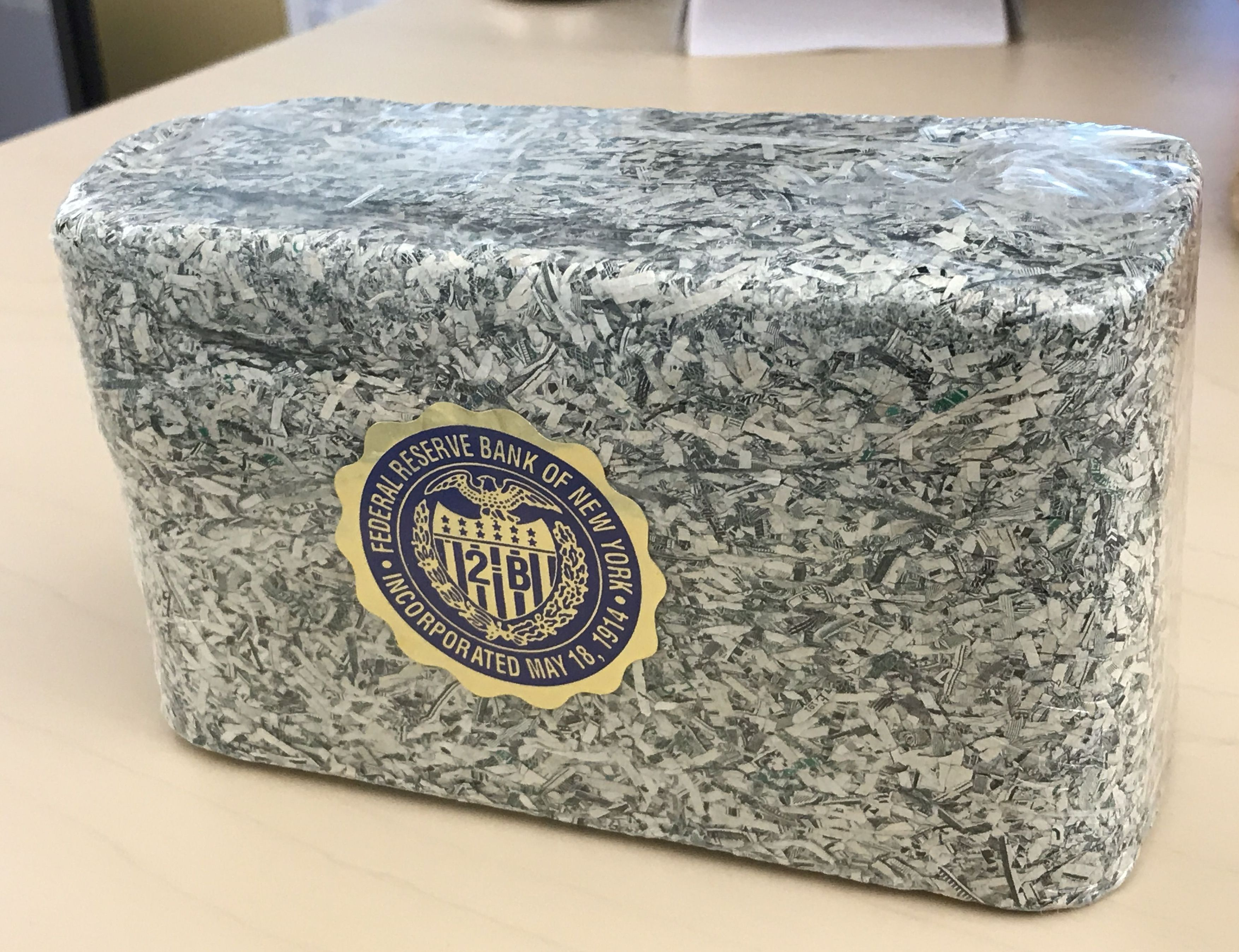
Shredded and briquetted US dollar notes from the Federal Reserve Bank of New York (approx. 1000 pieces, 1 kg)

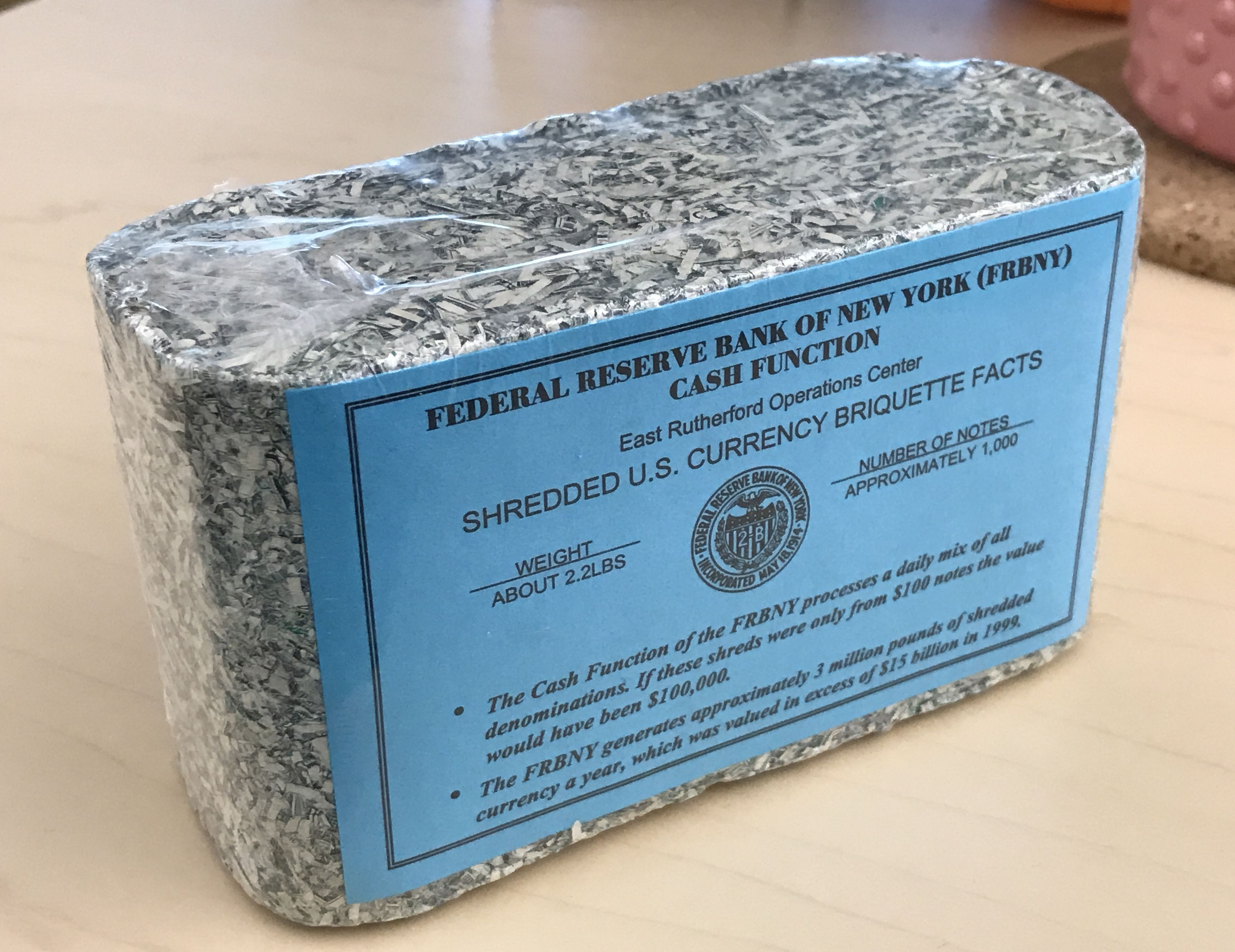
Shredded and briquetted US dollar notes from the Federal Reserve Bank of New York (approx. 1000 pieces, 1 kg)

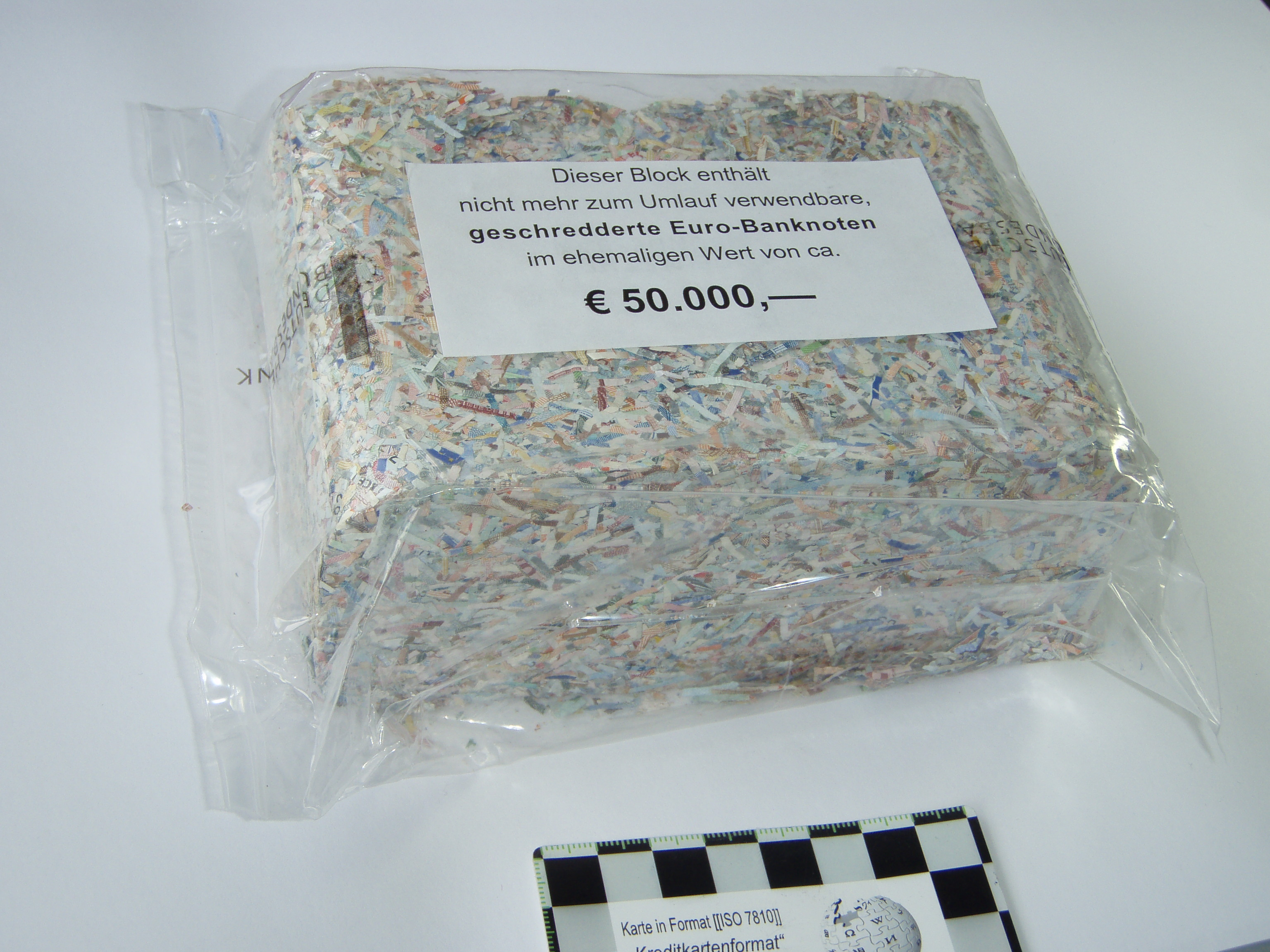
Shredded and briquetted euro banknotes from the Deutsche Bundesbank, Germany (approx. 1 kg)

== Intelligent banknote neutralisation systems ==
Intelligent banknote neutralisation systems (IBNS) are security systems which render banknotes unusable by marking them permanently as stolen with a degradation agent. Marked (stained) banknotes cannot be brought back into circulation easily and can be linked to the crime scene. Today's most used degradation agent is a special security ink which cannot be removed from the banknote easily and not without destroying the banknote itself, but other agents also exist. Today IBNSs are used to protect banknotes in automated teller machines, retail machines, and during cash-in-transit operations.

== Dynamic Intelligent Currency Encryption ==
Dynamic Intelligent Currency Encryption (DICE) is a security technology introduced in 2014 by the British company EDAQS that devalues banknotes remotely that are illegal or have been stolen. The technology is based on identifiable banknotes—that could be an RFID chip or a barcode—and connects to a digital security system to verify the validity of the banknote. The company claims that the banknotes are unforgeable and contribute to solving cash-related problems as well as fighting crime and terrorism. On a related note, governments consider the DICE benefits to be a driving force behind the progressive abolition of cash because they cover and resolve almost all cash-related issues.

== Confiscation and asset forfeiture ==
In the United States, many laws allow the confiscation of cash and other assets from the bearer if there is suspicion that the money came from an illegal activity. Because a significant amount of U.S. currency contains traces of cocaine and other illegal drugs, it is not uncommon for innocent people searched at airports or stopped for traffic violations to have cash in their possession sniffed by trained dogs for drugs and then have the cash seized because the dog smelled drugs on the money. It is then up to the owner of the money to prove where the cash came from at his own expense. Many people simply forfeit the money. In 1994, the United States Court of Appeals, Ninth Circuit, held in the case of United States of America v. U.S. Currency, $30,060.00 (39 F.3d 1039 63 USLW 2351, No. 92-55919) that the widespread presence of illegal substances on paper currency in the Los Angeles area created a situation where the reaction of a drug-sniffing dog would not create probable cause for civil forfeiture.

== See also ==
- Banknote counter
- J. S. G. Boggs
- Contaminated currency
- Hell money
- Hybrid paper-polymer banknote
- Intaglio
- List of motifs on banknotes
- List of people on banknotes
- Money creation
- Postal currency
- Trevett v. Weeden
- United States Note
- Used note

== Bibliography ==
- Atack, Jeremy; Passell, Peter (1994). A New Economic View of American History. New York: W.W. Norton and Co. ISBN 978-0-393-96315-1.
- Bowman, John S. (2000). Columbia Chronologies of Asian History and Culture. New York: Columbia University Press. ISBN 978-0-2311-1004-4.
- Ebrey; Walthall; Palais (2006). East Asia: A Cultural, Social, and Political History. Boston: Houghton Mifflin Company. ISBN 978-0-6181-3384-0.
- Gernet, Jacques (1962). Daily Life in China on the Eve of the Mongol Invasion, 1250–1276. Stanford University Press.
- Needham, Joseph (1986). Science and Civilisation in China: Volume 5, Part 1. Cambridge University Press. ISBN 978-0-5218-7566-0.
- Mockford, Jack (2014). "They are Exactly as Banknotes are": Perceptions and Technologies of Bank Note Forgery During the Bank Restriction Period, 1797–1821 (PDF) (PhD). University of Hertfordshire. Archived from the original (PDF) on 17 February 2022.
