= Dynamic intelligent currency encryption =

Dynamic intelligent currency encryption (DICE) is a technological concept designed to enhance the security of paper currency. The system tracks and monitors banknotes in circulation using identifiable characteristics, allowing for the remote devaluation of banknotes involved in fraudulent activities or criminal transactions. Developed in 2014 by the British-Austrian technology company EDAQS, DICE involves the use of Machine Readable Codes (MRC) or radio-frequency identification (RFID) tags embedded in banknotes. These banknotes are then registered to a centralized system, purportedly rendering them secure and resistant to forgery.

The primary objective of DICE is to engage the banking and retail sectors in a system where cash circulation is passively monitored and controlled. Additionally, DICE aims to serve as an alternative to the complete elimination of physical currency, offering benefits similar to a cashless economy, such as reducing cash-related crimes, without entirely removing cash from circulation.

DICE has similarities to Intelligent Banknote Neutralisation Systems (IBNS). Banknotes neutralized under the DICE system are intended to be permanently withdrawn from circulation and can be linked to specific criminal incidents.

== Concept ==
The DICE system relies on businesses and individuals who handle cash registering banknotes through connected readers known as DICE clouds. During the registration process, the DICE user is informed about the legitimacy of the incoming banknote and warned if the banknote is linked to a crime, is forged, or has been degraded for some reason. Once the banknote has been successfully assigned to the user’s account, the remote devaluation of the notes could occur in the event of a robbery or destruction due to catastrophes like fire or flood. The account holder would then receive new banknotes.

== Technology ==
The DICE system involves an identifiable banknote that carries an identification module, such as a machine-readable code or microRFID-chip. The system includes a blockchain-enabled cloud device that scans, reads, and registers the banknotes, as well as centralized software for managing registration and devaluation. The software system is based on a blockchain that provides a centralized registry of banknotes, such as the CEDIRE hyperledger. This system deactivates or reactivates illegal and degraded banknotes remotely and includes a dedicated unit responsible for monitoring the system's functionality.

In addition to MRC-equipped banknotes, DICE also proposes the use of a microchip specifically designed to be secure and durable. The RFIT microchip, developed by EDAQS in collaboration with Australian partner RFIT Limited, meets these criteria. The chip measures 0.45 mm x 0.45 mm x 0.2 mm and has an antenna placed directly onto the chip silicon. The RFIT chip is considered more secure due to its limited read range of up to 3 mm, requiring a specially designed near field antenna (NFA) to activate it, unlike standard RFID tags. Additionally, a normal UHF RFID reader cannot activate and read the tag. The RFIT chip conforms to Electronic Product Code (EPC) Class 1, gen2 ISO 18000-6C.

== Reception ==
EDAQS has stated that their system would allow central and national banks to monitor cash circulation more closely without compromising the privacy of cash users. Additionally, EDAQS has suggested that closer tracking of cash could open new avenues for economic research. The concept has faced criticism from the German and Austrian Pirates Party.

== See also ==
- Banknote
- Intelligent banknote neutralisation system
