= Commemorative banknotes of the renminbi =

Commemorative banknotes from mainland China

As of 2026, ten commemorative banknotes have been issued in China, each commemorating an event or national institution.

== Summary ==
In 1999, a commemorative red ¥50 note was issued in honour of the 50th anniversary of the establishment of the People's Republic of China. This note features Chinese Communist Party chairman Mao Zedong on the front and various animals on the back.

An orange polymer note, commemorating the new millennium was issued in 2000 with a face value of ¥100. This features a dragon on the obverse and the reverse features the China Millennium monument (at the Center for Cultural and Scientific Fairs).

For the 2008 Beijing Olympics, a green ¥10 note was issued featuring the Bird's Nest Stadium on the front with the back showing a classical Olympic discus thrower and various other athletes.

On 26 November 2015, the People's Bank of China issued a blue ¥100 commemorative note to commemorate aerospace science and technology.

In commemoration of the 70th Anniversary of the issuance of the Renminbi, the People's Bank of China issued 120 million ¥50 banknotes on 28 December 2018.

In commemoration of the 2022 Winter Olympics, the People's Bank of China issued ¥20 commemorative banknotes in both paper and polymer in December 2021.

Since the 2024 Chinese New Year, the People's Bank of China issued ¥20 commemorative banknotes in polymer with a picture of each zodiac annually.

== List ==
Value	Dimensions	Main Colour	Description			Date of			Numbers printed
Value	Dimensions	Main Colour	Obverse	Reverse	Watermark	printing	issue	material	Numbers printed
¥50	165 ×80 mm	Red	Mao Zedong and Tiananmen Square	Imperial lion (Forbidden City), pigeons, "Huabiao" (marble pillar)	None	1999	September 20, 1999	Paper	60,000,000
¥100	165 ×80 mm	Orange	Dragon from "Nine Dragons Wall" (Imperial palace, Peking)	China Millennium monument (Center for cultural and scientific fairs), flying "Apsaras" (cloud girls)	None	2000	November 28, 2000	Polymer	10,000,000
¥10	148.5 × 72 mm	Green	Bird Nest Stadium	Discus Thrower of Myron (460 b.C.), sportsmen	Bird Nest Stadium	2008	July 8, 2008	Paper	6,000,000
¥100	155 × 77 mm	Blue	Stylized Dongfanghong I satellite, Shenzhou 9 crewed spacecraft rendezvous and docking with Tiangong-1 space station, Chang’e 1 lunar-orbiting spacecraft	Advancement of flight - Bird, Fung Joe Guey Biplane, Airliner (presumably a COMAC C909), Shenzhou 9 and Tiangong-1 crewed spacecraft, Chang’e 1 lunar-orbiting spacecraft	Stylized Dongfanghong I satellite	2015	November 26, 2015	Paper	300,000,000
¥50	150 × 70 mm	Orange	Five series of Renminbi Yuan bank notes in the form of a tree's growth rings	Old and New Peoples Bank of China Headquarter buildings, peony flower 1948 newspaper article that announced the issuance of Renminbi Yuan	Great Wall of China	2018	December 28, 2018	Paper	120,000,000
¥20	145 × 70 mm	Blue	Ski jumper	Snow Ruyi National Ski Jumping Centre and Great Wall of China	The mascots of 2022 Winter Olympics, Bing Dwen Dwen	2022	December 21, 2021	Paper	200,000,000 (for each type)
¥20	145 × 70 mm	Blue	Pair of figure skaters	Water Cube	None	2022	December 21, 2021	Polymer	200,000,000 (for each type)
¥20	145 × 70 mm	Orange	Dragon	Children with paper dragon	None	2024	December 15, 2023	Polymer	100,000,000
¥20	145 × 70 mm	Pink	Snake	Children hanging Spring Festival banner; Shanxi residential houses	None	2025	December 16, 2024	Polymer	100,000,000
¥20	145 × 70 mm	Pink	Horse	Children celebrating with gongs, flute and drums; Stylized Mongolian nomadic yurt	None	2026	December 22, 2025	Polymer	100,000,000
For table standards, see the banknote specification table.
