= Die =

Die, as a verb, refers to death, the cessation of life.

Die may also refer to:

== Games ==
- Die, singular of dice, small throwable objects used for producing random numbers

== Manufacturing ==
- Die (integrated circuit), a rectangular piece of a semiconductor wafer
- Die (manufacturing), a material-shaping device
- Die (philately)
- Coin die, a metallic piece used to strike a coin
- Die casting, a material-shaping process
  - Sort (typesetting), a cast die for printing
- Die cutting (web), process of using a die to shear webs of low-strength materials
- Die, a tool used in paper embossing
- Tap and die, cutting tools used to create screw threads in solid substances
- Tool and die, the occupation of making dies

== Arts and media ==
=== Music ===
- Die (album), the seventh studio album by rapper Necro
- Die (musician), Japanese musician, guitarist of the band Dir en grey
- DJ Die, British DJ and musician with Reprazent
- "DiE", a 2013 single by the Japanese idol group BiS
- die!, an inactive German Neue Deutsche Härte band

=== Other uses in arts and media ===
- Die (film), a 2010 thriller film directed by Dominic James
- Die (comics and role-playing game), an interconnected comic book series and tabletop role-playing game written by Kieron Gillen and illustrated by Stephanie Hans

== Other uses ==
- Arrachart Airport (IATA airport code DIE)
- Die, a grammar article, in the Afrikaans and German languages
- Die, Drôme, a town in France
- Duplication is evil, a programming motto
- German Development Institute, a German think tank for multilateral development policy

== See also ==
- Dai (disambiguation)
- Di (disambiguation)
- Dié (disambiguation)
- Dies (disambiguation)
- Dice (disambiguation)
- Dicing
- Dye
