= Dié =

Dié may refer to:

- Dié, Burkina Faso, a village in the Dapelogo Department
- 蝶 (hanyu pinyin : dié), a Chinese character meaning butterfly
- Saint-Dié, a commune in Vosges département in northeastern France

== See also ==
- Die (disambiguation)
