= Mexican 20-peso note =

Small denomination banknote

Twenty pesos
- Country: Mexico
- Value: 20 Mexican pesos
- Width: 127 mm
- Height: 66 mm
- Material used: Polymer
- Years of printing: 2007–2018

Obverse
- Design: Benito Juarez
- Design date: 2006

Reverse
- Design: Monte Albán
- Design date: 2006

The Mexican 20-peso note in the F family is the smallest banknote in denomination when it comes to Mexican currency, and is the most commonly used in Mexico, other than the 1,000-peso note that is normally only used for high-value transactions. On August 27, 2018 it was confirmed there is a plan for the note to be gradually replaced by a coin. The bills aesthetic draws inspiration from the State of Oaxaca.

The 20 pesos banknote had a portrait of Benito Juárez, the twenty-sixth president of the Mexican Republic who fought in the Reform War. He declared a constitution and promoted education. It also has a balance that represents the people and justice above the law reform and the bird.

On the reverse side is an image of Monte Alban, located in the state of Oaxaca. Below it is the symbol of Cocijo, and finally the mark of the Bank of Mexico.

== Obverse ==
As the main subject of the bill the stands the effigy of Don Benito Juárez García (1806 - 1872), who in 1858 took presidency of the Mexican Republic and the year after put forward the Law of Reform with the support of the liberal party. For his defence of the Mexican Republic against foreign powers.

Don Benito Juarez Garcia´s effigy is accompanied by a scale, meant to symbolize balance and justice, and a book meant to represent the Laws of Reform published in 1859.

== Security Measures ==
=== Touch sensitive Reliefs ===
In some areas, the surface of the bill has a small touch-sensitive relief, especially if they are very new. The areas where they feel are: Legend of Bank of Mexico, the Law Reform, in the 45th degree rotated says 20 pesos and below the transparent part of the printing Ave.

=== Texts microprinted ===
The micro-printed texts are small texts, it is necessary to use glasses or lenses to be observed. On the obverse tickets are 20 pesos microprinted text in various parts of the body ticket "20 pesos". Butterfly below reads letters of decreasing height: "Among individuals as among nations respect the rights of others is peace", which is a very famous phrase of Benito Juarez.

=== Parties change colors ===
A special ink that changes color depending on the level of light is used, which is in the left wing of the bird and the symbol that is above the transparent window. It may be noted to rotate and tilt the ticket.

=== Hilo microprinted ===
This wire is part of the polymer from which the ticket is made. The existence of such tests involve passing the thread in a banknote ultraviolet lamp inside which the ticket show small luminescent threads. The thread says "20 pesos"

=== Linear Funds ===
On the front and back of the bill is a composite of figures and broad, thin stripes design, which can only be seen with a magnifying glass. As a kind of irregular Skin

=== Perfect Record ===
In the right corner is the map of Mexico incomplete but direct light map is fully and equally for the compass.

=== Watermark ===
Security is another brand that just, it is already done in the polymer is to direct light. In this case, the image is observed Juarez gray.

=== Transparent Window ===
It is a small transparent window in the lower corner that says 20 pesos.

== History ==
The bills that preceded it were series B, D, F and G.

=== series B ===
following the introduction of the new peso in 1992 a twenty peso note was introduced featuring Don Andres Quintana Roo but replaced again by the paper 20 peso not with Benito Juarez on

=== series D ===
series D introduced in 2001 had the same designs of the cotton series but instead was now printed on polymer

=== series F ===
these notes still featured Benito Juarez but as it was a low-denomination banknote the bank decided to do it this time and had a polymer similar to the previous design, not like other bills like Mexico fifty-peso bill or Mexico One hundred-peso bill.

=== series G ===
This series did not originally consider including a $20 note, since it would gradually be replaced by a coin, but a $20 note to commemorate the bicentennial of Mexican independence was issued in September 2021.

== History of Character: Benito Juarez ==
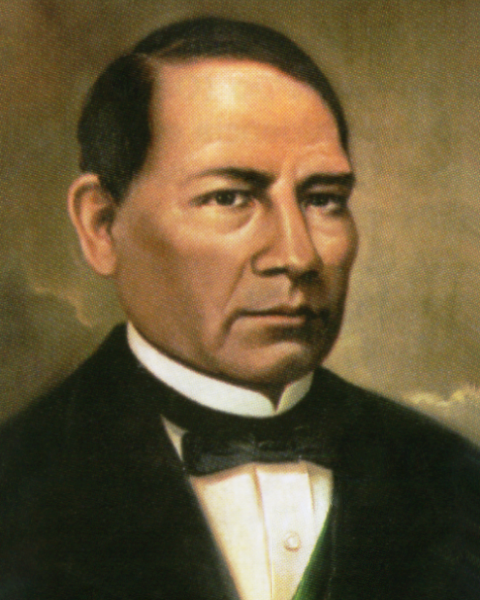
Benito Juárez

Benito Pablo Juarez Garcia (San Pablo Guelatao, Oaxaca, March 21, 1806 - Mexico City, July 18, 1872) was a Mexican lawyer and politician of Zapotec Indian origin, later becoming president of Mexico, serving from 18 December 1857 till his death on 18 July 1872. You will be known as the "Father of the Americas" 3 is celebrated her sentence "Among individuals, as among nations, respect for the rights of others is peace".

Benito Juárez lived during one of the most important times in Mexico's history, considered by many historians as the leading the consolidation of the nation into a republic.

== See also ==
- Mexican Peso
