= Polymer banknote =

Banknotes made from synthetic polymer

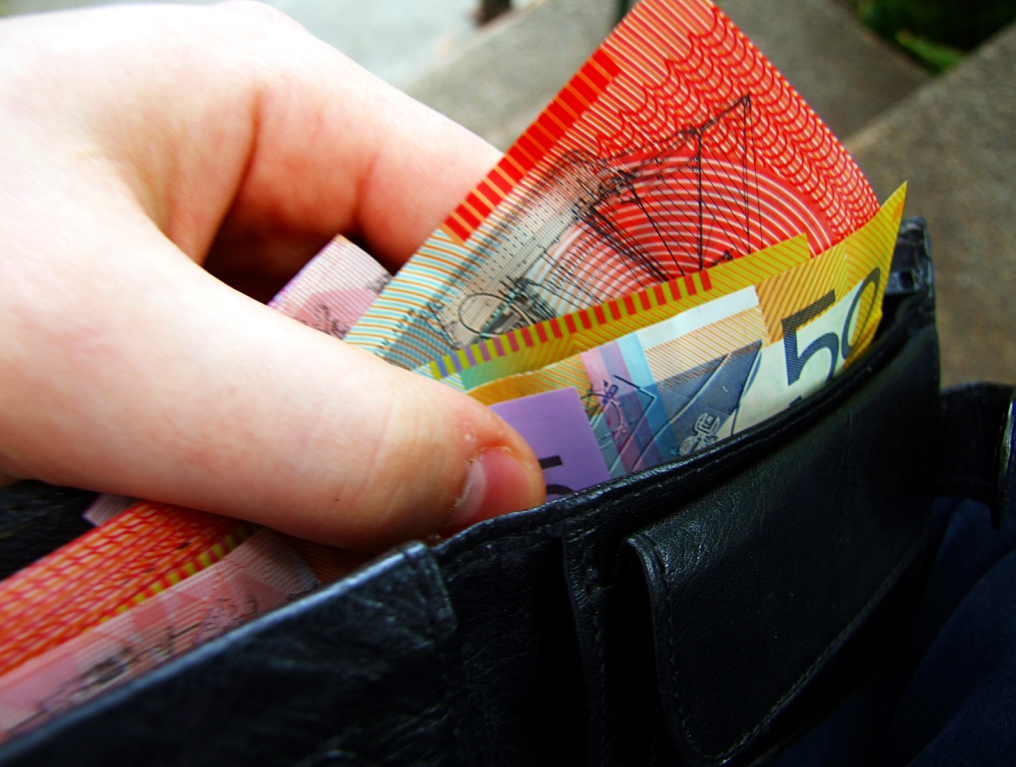
Banknotes of the Australian dollar in a wallet. In 1988, Australia was the first country to introduce polymer banknotes for circulation.

Polymer banknotes are banknotes made from a synthetic polymer such as biaxially oriented polypropylene (BOPP). Such notes incorporate many security features not available in paper banknotes, including the use of metameric inks. Polymer banknotes last significantly longer than paper notes, causing a decrease in environmental impact and a reduced cost of production and replacement. DuPont Tyvek polymer notes were experimentally issued by Haiti, Costa Rica, and The Isle of Man, from 1982. Modern polymer banknotes were developed by the Reserve Bank of Australia (RBA), Commonwealth Scientific and Industrial Research Organisation (CSIRO) and The University of Melbourne. They were first issued as currency in Australia during 1988 (coinciding with Australia's bicentennial year); by 1996, the Australian dollar was switched completely to polymer banknotes. Romania was the first country in Europe to issue a plastic note in 1999 and became the third country, after Australia and New Zealand, to fully convert to polymer by 2003.

Other currencies that have been switched completely to polymer banknotes include: the Brunei dollar (2006), the Nigerian Naira (2007), the Papua New Guinean kina (2008), the Canadian dollar (2013), the Maldivian rufiyaa (2017), the Mauritanian ouguiya (2017), the Nicaraguan córdoba (2017), the Vanuatu vatu (2017), the Eastern Caribbean dollar (2019), the pound sterling (2021) and the Barbadian dollar (2022). Several countries and regions have introduced polymer banknotes into commemorative or general circulation, including: Nigeria, Cape Verde, Chile, The Gambia, Trinidad and Tobago, Vietnam, Mexico, Taiwan, Singapore, Malaysia, Botswana, São Tomé and Príncipe, North Macedonia, Oman, Russia, Solomon Islands, Samoa, Morocco, Albania, Sri Lanka, Hong Kong, Israel, China, Kuwait, Mozambique, Saudi Arabia, Isle of Man, Guatemala, Haiti, Jamaica, Libya, Mauritius, Costa Rica, Honduras, Angola, Namibia, Lebanon, the Philippines, Egypt, the United Arab Emirates, Thailand, Turkmenistan, Bermuda, and Bhutan.

== History ==
In 1959, DuPont discovered and developed a polymer they would patent and trademark as Tyvek, and later Bradvek; the material is commonly used for envelopes, but was used, from 1982, for experimental bank note series in Haiti, Costa Rica, and the Isle of Man. In the 1980s, Canadian engineering company AGRA Vadeko and US chemical company US Mobil Chemical Company developed a polymer substrate trademarked as DuraNote. It had been tested by the Bank of Canada in the 1980s and 1990s; test C$ 20 and C$ 50 banknotes were auctioned in October 2012. It was also tested by the Bureau of Engraving and Printing of the United States Department of the Treasury in 1997 and 1998, when 40,000 test banknotes were printed and evaluated; and was evaluated by the central banks of 28 countries.

== Security features ==
Polymer banknotes usually have three levels of security devices. Primary security devices are easily recognisable by consumers and may include intaglio, metal strips, and the clear areas of the banknote. Secondary security devices are detectable by a machine. Tertiary security devices may only be detectable by the issuing authority when a banknote is returned.

== Adoption ==
Modern polymer banknotes were first developed by the Reserve Bank of Australia (RBA) and the Commonwealth Scientific and Industrial Research Organisation or CSIRO and first issued as currency in Australia during 1988, to coincide with Australia's bicentennial year.

In August 2012, Nigeria's Central Bank attempted the switch back from polymer to paper banknotes, saying there were "significant difficulties associated with the processing and destruction of the polymer banknotes" which had "constrained the realisation of the benefits expected from polymer banknotes over paper notes". However, President Goodluck Jonathan halted the process in September 2012.

The polymer notes in the Republic of Mauritius are available in values of ₨ 25, ₨ 50, ₨ 500 and ₨ 2,000, Recently in December 2024, the Bank of Mauritius has announced that there will be issues of Rs 100, Rs 200, and Rs 1000 banknotes. The Fiji FJ$5 was issued in April 2013.

In the United Kingdom, the first polymer banknotes were issued by the Northern Bank in Northern Ireland in 2000; these were a special commemorative issue bearing an image of the Space Shuttle. (Note: Although the £5 Northern Bank polymer banknote was a one-off commemorative issued, unconventionally, in portrait orientation to mark the year 2000, it was in general circulation, with normal serial numbers (the commemorative version has serial numbers beginning with "Y2K", normal versions with "MM"). It is the only Northern Bank note in circulation which was not affected by the recall of all the bank's notes as a result of the 26.5 million pound raid on its Belfast headquarters on 20 December 2004.) In March 2015, the Clydesdale Bank in Scotland began to issue polymer Sterling £5 notes marking the 125th anniversary of the building of the Forth Bridge. These were the first polymer notes to enter general circulation in the UK. The Royal Bank of Scotland followed in 2016 with a new issue of plastic £5 notes illustrated with a picture of author Nan Shepherd. In September 2016, the Bank of England began to issue £5 polymer notes with a picture of Winston Churchill; and in 2017 a polymer £10 began replacing its paper equivalent, featuring a picture of the author Jane Austen. A polymer £20 was issued in 2020 with a picture of J.M.W. Turner, and the £50 note was released in 2021, featuring Alan Turing. Although the polymer Bank of England notes are 15% smaller than the older, paper issue, they bear a similar design. Some businesses operating in the UK cash industry have opposed the switch to polymer, citing a lack of research into the cost impact of its introduction. In December 2022, following the death of Queen Elizabeth II, the Bank of England unveiled the design of a new series of banknotes featuring King Charles III. The rest of the design, however, is unchanged, with the exception of a slight alteration in colour.

In the Philippines, it was proposed in 2009 to shift to the usage of polymer for Philippine peso banknotes. This did not push through due to concern the shift would have over the impact to country's abaca industry. The proposal was revived in 2021 during the COVID-19 pandemic since the polymer banknotes can be sanitized with less damage compared to paper banknotes, as well as other reasons such as durability, lesser average issue cost, and lesser susceptibility to counterfeiting. In April 2022, the Bangko Sentral ng Pilipinas officially released the 1000 peso bill polymer bank note into circulation. In December 2024, the BSP (Central Bank of the Philippines) has announced that they will be issuing polymer notes in the denominations of 500, 100, and 50 pesos in the first quarter of 2025.

Despite having the updated logo and the updated signature of the current president, there are no plans for a 20 peso polymer note due to it being slowly shifted into becoming a coin. There are also no plans for a 200 peso polymer banknote due to low demand.

Timeline of adoptions and withdrawals of polymer banknotes
Country	Date of first introduction	Notes
N/A	Early 1980s	An alternative polymer of polyethylene fibres marketed as Tyvek by DuPont was developed for use as currency by the American Bank Note Company in the early 1980s.
Haiti	1982	Haiti released Tyvek-made Gourde banknotes in denominations of 1, 2, 50, 100, 250 & 500. The same denominations and a 5 Gourdes banknote were also released on paper.
Costa Rica	1983	Costa Rica issued a 20 Colones Tyvek banknote.
Isle of Man	1983	The Isle of Man issued a 1 Pound banknote, this time called Bradvek and printed by Bradbury Wilkinson.
N/A	Late 1980s	Tyvek did not perform well in trials; smudging of ink and fragility were reported as problems, so production of Tyvek banknotes was discontinued.
Australia	1988	Australia introduced the ten-dollar note to celebrate its bicentennial. This was the world's first true polymer banknote. It was only printed during that year.
Singapore	1990	Singapore issued a S$50 in polymer substrate to commemorate the 25th Anniversary of Independence.
Papua New Guinea	1991	Papua New Guinea issued its first 2 Kinas banknote in polymer substrate to commemorate the 9th South Pacific Games held in the country.
Australia	1992	Australia begins its transition away from paper money to polymer banknotes.
Indonesia	1993	Indonesia issued a Rp 50,000 commemorative banknote in conjunction with the 25 Years of Development by President Suharto which is the first polymer banknote issued by the Bank Indonesia. But polymer banknotes are never issued again in the later series.
Brunei	1996	Brunei introduced its first polymer banknotes in denominations of 1, 5, 10 dollars.
Sri Lanka	4 February 1998	Sri Lanka issued a රු.200 commemorative banknote in conjunction with the 50th Anniversary of Independence which is so far the only polymer banknote issued by the Central Bank of Sri Lanka.
Australia	1996	Australia converted all of its denominations into polymer banknotes, becoming the first country in the world to do so.
Thailand	18 August 1997	Thailand issued its first polymer banknote, a 50 Baht denomination. On 1 October 2004 it was replaced by a redesigned version printed on paper.
Malaysia	1998	Malaysia issued a RM50 commemorative banknote in conjunction with the XVI Commonwealth Games, the first polymer banknote ever issued by Bank Negara Malaysia.
New Zealand	May 1999	New Zealand converted all of its banknotes into polymer banknotes.
Taiwan	June 1999	Taiwan issued its first polymer banknote (NT$50) to commemorate 50 years of the New Taiwan dollar's issuance.
Romania	August 1999	In celebration of the total solar eclipse of 11 August 1999, the National Bank of Romania (BNR) decided to issue a commemorative two thousand Romanian lei banknote. Since it was the last eclipse of the millennium, the denomination was chosen to be 2000 in respect to the upcoming year. These notes were issued as legal tender.
Indonesia	1 November 1999	Bank Indonesia introduced a Rp 100,000 polymer banknote in circulation, the first banknote of such value to be issued.
Brazil	April 2000	Brazil introduced a R$10 polymer banknote as a special edition issue commemorating the country's 500th anniversary.
China	28 November 2000	The People's Bank of China releases a commemorative ¥100 banknote to celebrate the new millennium and the Year of the Dragon.
Bangladesh	January 2001	Bangladesh introduced the 10 taka polymer banknote, originally they were due to be issued on Victory Day, a day big for Bangladeshis, but were delayed.
Nepal	February 2002	The Kingdom of Nepal introduced a commemorative 10 rupees polymer banknote, on the occasion of King Gyanendra's accession to the Nepalese throne after the Nepalese royal massacre. It was rendered obsolete when the Kingdom fell and was replaced by 2008.
Mexico	September 2002	Mexico switched the 20 peso denomination from paper to polymer banknotes. and they issued a 100 peso with vertical design polymer banknote in 2020.
Romania	2003	Romania converted all of its denominations of the leu to polymer, becoming the first European country to do so.
Zambia	2003	The Bank of Zambia introduces two polymer banknotes in denominations of K500 and K1,000.
Vietnam	December 2003	Vietnam adopted polymer banknote in denominations of 10,000, 20,000, 50,000, 100,000, 200,000 and 500,000 đồng for general circulation.
Malaysia	October 2004	Bank Negara Malaysia introduces a 5 ringgit polymer banknote into circulation, with the same design as the paper version. This was the first non-commemorative polymer banknote to be issued. Both polymer and paper versions were in circulation concurrently.
Indonesia	November 2004	Bank Indonesia switched its Rp 100,000 polymer banknote into a paper banknote with a different design than the polymer version.
Romania	July 2005	Romania redenominated the leu, removing four zeroes and issuing a series of new denominations in polymer.
Mexico	2006	Two more new polymer notes issued in 2006, for 20-pesos (new design) and the 50-pesos and they issued a 100 peso with vertical design polymer banknote in 2020.
Brunei	2006	Brunei had adopted polymer banknotes for all of its banknote denominations.
Australia	2006	The Australian Government agency CSIRO issued a non-legal tender polymer note to celebrate the 80th year of the formation of CSIRO. These notes were issued and distributed to staff members and at selected public events.
Vietnam	August 2006	Vietnam adopted polymer banknote in 10,000, 20,000, 50,000, 100,000, 200,000 and 500,000 đồng for general circulation.
Romania	1 December 2006	The National Bank of Romania issued a new denomination, 200 lei.
Hong Kong	2007	The Government of the Hong Kong Special Administrative Region issued polymer banknotes for the first time. The banknotes are in HK$ 10.
Nigeria	February 2007	As part of the Nigerian economic reforms, the 20 naira note was issued for the first time in polymer substrate.
Guatemala	August 2007	Guatemala introduced polymer banknotes in denominations of 1 quetzal and 5 quetzales.
Nicaragua	2008	An announcement from the Central Bank of Nicaragua in 2008 stated that a new 200 Córdoba banknote would be in circulation.
Israel	13 April 2008	Israel started to issue 20 ILS banknotes, due to the high deterioration of 20 ILS paper banknotes. The Israeli polymer notes are printed by Orell Füssli Security Printing of Zürich, Switzerland.
Romania	1 December 2008	The National Bank of Romania issued a revised 10 lei banknote.
Nicaragua	2009	On 15 May, Nicaragua released new polymer ten and twenty Nicaragua córdoba banknotes to replace their paper counterparts. After an announcement from the Central Bank of Nicaragua in 2008 stated that a new 200 Córdoba banknote would be in circulation, it took the country an additional year to prepare its new set of banknotes. A new polymer two hundred and a hundred córdoba banknote was first issued on the first of June 2009. In December 2009, a new 50 banknote was released, later followed by a new 500 banknote that was issued on 12 January 2010.
Paraguay	August 2009	The Central Bank of Paraguay introduces polymer ₲2,000 banknotes.
India	September 2009	The Reserve Bank of India announced that it will introduce 1 billion 10-rupee notes.
Chile	September 2009	The Central Bank of Chile introduced a new series of the Chilean peso, starting with the redesigned 5000 Pesos banknote.
Nigeria	30 September 2009	Three Nigerian bank notes (₦50, ₦10 and ₦5) were converted to polymer substrate following the successful performance of the 20 naira (polymer) banknote.
Honduras	12 January 2010	The Central Bank of Honduras introduces a polymer L20 banknote.
Nicaragua	12 January 2010	Nicaragua released a new 500 banknote.
Dominican Republic	June 2010	The Central Bank of the Dominican Republic announced the introduction of a new polymer based 20 pesos note.
Chile	October 2010	The Central Bank of Chile announced the redesigned 2000 Pesos that went into circulation on 20 November, as a program to change the old designs and make them more secure.
Canada	November 2011	The Bank of Canada introduced the Frontier Series $100 polymer banknote to modernise its currency and reduce counterfeiting. $50 banknotes were put into circulation in March 2012; the $20 note was put into circulation on 7 November 2012 with the $10 and $5 denominations released on 7 November 2013.
Guatemala	November 2011	Guatemala introduced new polymer banknote in denomination of 5 quetzales.
Malaysia	16 July 2012	Bank Negara Malaysia put new RM1 and RM5 polymer banknotes into circulation as part of a new banknote series.
United Kingdom	2013	The Bank of England announced that it would adopt polymer notes.
Fiji	2 April 2013	Fiji's first polymer banknote, a $5 banknote, enters circulation.
India	April 2013	The Reserve Bank of India introduced plastic/polymer currency note of ₹ 10 on a field trial basis in five cities in India.
Mauritius	22 August 2013	The Bank of Mauritius issued new 25-, 50-, and 500-rupee polymer banknotes which will circulate in parallel with the existing paper notes of the same denominations. The new polymer notes have almost the same design as the preceding paper banknotes, but contain numerous new security features such as transparent windows showing the image of the dodo, numbers printed with magnetic ink which become fluorescent under ultra violet light, and swing features printed in iridescent ink, which change to a different colour when observed in transparency or when tilted. The 25-, and 50-rupee notes are printed by Oberthur Technologies on Innovia Security's Guardian substrate and the 500-rupee note is printed by De La Rue on its Safeguard (formerly Flexycoin) substrate.
Lebanon	22 November 2013	The Banque du Liban issued a £L50,000 banknote in polymer to commemorate the country's 70th anniversary of independence.
Lebanon	2014	The Banque du Liban issued a £L50,000 banknote in polymer to commemorate the 50th anniversary of the founding of the Banque du Liban.
Vanuatu	2014	The Reserve Bank of Vanuatu introduced polymer banknotes in denominations of 200, 1,000, and 2,000 vatu. Regular 10,000-vatu banknotes were also introduced that year to replace the commemorative versions, which were originally issued in 2010.
Poland	5 August 2014	The National Bank of Poland issued 50,000 20 zł polymer banknotes to commemorate the 100th anniversary of the formation of the Polish Legions.
The Gambia	20 July 2014	The Central Bank of the Gambia issued a 20 Dalasis banknote printed on De La Rue's Safeguard polymer substrate. It commemorates "20 Years of Progress and Self-Reliance", coinciding with President Yahya Jammeh's 20 years in office as president.
Mauritania	28 November 2014	The Central Bank of Mauritania issued a 1,000 Ouguiya banknote on Innovia Security's Guardian substrate.
Trinidad and Tobago	15 December 2014	The Central Bank of Trinidad and Tobago issued a TT$50 note printed on polymer to commemorate the 50th anniversary of the establishment of the Central Bank of Trinidad & Tobago.
Cape Verde	23 December 2014	The Banco de Cabo Verde issued a new family of escudo banknotes that honour Cape Verdean figures in the fields of literature, music, and politics. One note in the new series is the 200 escudos banknote, now printed on polymer.
New Zealand	2015	The Reserve Bank of New Zealand introduced a new family of notes with improved security features, with the 5 and 10 in October 2015, and the 20, 50 and 100 dollar banknotes in April 2016.
Scotland	2015	Clydesdale Bank issued two million £5 notes, printed in polymer. It features a portrait of Sir William Arrol and an image of the Forth Bridge.
India	2015	The Reserve Bank of India announced plans to introduce polymer banknotes on a pilot basis and improve security features to defeat the efforts of counterfeiters.
Lebanon	2015	The Banque du Liban issued a £L50,000 banknote in polymer to commemorate the 70th Anniversary of the Lebanese Army.
Papua New Guinea	2015	The Bank of Papua New Guinea issued 10 and 20 kina notes in polymer, one to commemorate the XV Pacific Games and the other to commemorate the 40th Anniversary of Papua New Guinean independence.
Maldives	2015	The Maldives Authority Monetary introduced a new family of banknotes printed on De La Rue's "Safeguard" polymer substrate. A commemorative 5,000 Rufiyaa banknote was issued in July 2015, and followed by the 5-,10-, 20-, 50-, 100-, 500 and a new denomination of 1,000 Rufiyaa in October 2015.
Singapore	2015	The Monetary Authority of Singapore issued a set of polymer banknotes to commemorate the nation's 50th Anniversary of independence. It consists of five S$10 notes and a commemorative S$50 note.
Nicaragua	2015	The Banco Central de Nicaragua issued a new family of notes on 26 October 2015. They are printed in polymer, except for the 500 cordobas banknote, which is printed on cotton paper substrate.
Canada	9 September 2015	The Bank of Canada (Banque du Canada) issued a C$ 20 polymer banknote to commemorate Queen Elizabeth II's milestone as the longest-reigning monarch in Canada's modern era. It is similar to the regular issue 20-dollar Frontier Series polymer note, but the notable features for the commemorative note are the metallic portrait of the queen, based on a photograph taken by renowned Canadian photographer Yousuf Karsh, the metallic symbol including the Queen's monogram surmounted by the St. Edward's crown, surrounded by a garland of maple leaves and the text "A HISTORIC REIGN • UN RÈGNE HISTORIQUE" repeated at the top, center and bottom of the large window.
Gibraltar	2016	The Government of Gibraltar issued a £100 polymer banknote to commemorate Sir Joshua Hassan's 22 years as Chief Minister in the first half of 2016.
Scotland	2016	The Royal Bank of Scotland issued £5 and £10 banknotes in 2016 and 2017, respectively. The notes were printed on De La Rue's Safeguard polymer substrate.
Australia	1 September 2016	The Reserve Bank of Australia issued a A$ 5 polymer note with improved security features and a tactile feature to assist those with visual impairments.
United Kingdom	13 September 2016	The Bank of England began issuing the new polymer £ 5 note, the first to be issued in England and Wales.
India	17 March 2017	The Reserve Bank of India announced that it will do trials of polymer ₹10 notes at five locations in India.
Canada	1 June 2017	The Bank of Canada (Banque du Canada) unveiled a C$ 10 polymer banknote to commemorate the 150th anniversary of confederation.
Vanuatu	28 July 2017	According to an article in the Vanuatu Daily Post, the Reserve Bank of Vanuatu issued a new version of the 5,000-vatu banknote, with the 500-vatu issued just a few months later to complete the new banknote series which were introduced back in 2014.
United Kingdom	September 2017	The Bank of England issued a new polymer £ 10 note.
Romania	1 January 2018	The National Bank of Romania issued all denominations with the new (revised) coat of arms of Romania. All the other features remained unchanged for all the denominations.
São Tomé and Príncipe	1 January 2018	The Banco Central de Sao Tome and Principe issued polymer banknotes in denominations of 5 and 10 dobras.
Botswana	February 2018	The Bank of Botswana introduced a new 10-pula banknote printed on polymer to express the concern of the poor quality of the paper used in the printing of this denomination of banknote.
North Macedonia	May 2018	The National Bank of the Republic of North Macedonia issued 10- and 50-denari polymer banknotes as part of a new series.
Russia	22 May 2018	The Central Bank of Russia issued a ₽100 banknote to commemorate the 2018 FIFA World Cup.
Uruguay	September 2018	The Central Bank of Uruguay (BCU) printed a special and experimental edition of polymer banknotes with a value of 50 UYU to test reception and to celebrate the bank's 50th anniversary, that was in 2017, producing 10,000,000 units.
Mauritius	December 2018	The Bank of Mauritius has issued a 2,000-rupees banknote printed on polymer substrate and with revised security features, while at the same time all previous versions of the 2,000-rupees paper banknote ceased being legal tender by the end of January 2019.
Morocco	2019	The Central bank of Morocco introduced a 20 dirham polymer banknote to mark 20 years of enthronement of Mohammed VI.
Albania	2019	The Bank of Albania introduced a new 200 Lek polymer banknote on 30 September 2019.
Libya	17 February 2019	The Central Bank of Libya has issued a 1 Dinar banknote on 17 February 2019, in commemoration of the 8th Anniversary of the Libyan Revolution of 2011.
Northern Ireland	27 February 2019	Bank of Ireland, Danske Bank and Ulster Bank, commercial banks in Northern Ireland, each issued a new series of pound banknotes on polymer substrate for general use in Northern Ireland on 27 February 2019.
Solomon Islands	2 May 2019	The Central Bank of Solomon Islands introduced a new design of the SI$5 banknote, which was issued in conjunction of World Tuna Day.
Samoa	June 2019	The Central Bank of Samoa announced the release of a new 10 Tala polymer banknote in June 2019, to commemorate the XVI Pacific Games 2019 which were held in Samoa from 7 July 2019. The 10 Tala banknote will be the second polymer banknote issued in Samoa and the first carbon offset banknote created from the polymer substrate. The new banknote is one of a kind for Samoa as it will have a horizontal front and a vertical back. The banknote will feature a see through window depicting the Pacific Games logo, and a tactile embossed feature to assist the visually impaired, both are unique features of polymer banknotes. The standard banknote prefix has been replaced with the special PG/XVI prefix denoting "XVI Pacific Game". Issuance of the new 10 Tala note will commence the last week of June 2019, and will co-circulate together with the existing 10 tala banknotes which will remain legal tender.
Organisation of Eastern Caribbean States	Mid-2019	The Eastern Caribbean Central Bank started issuing a new family of banknotes from the EC$5 to the EC$100, all printed on polymer, a plan which has been announced since 5 September 2018.
Trinidad and Tobago	9 December 2019	The Central Bank of Trinidad and Tobago issued a TT$100 polymer banknote for circulation on 9 December 2019, while announcing that all versions of the paper TT$100 banknotes will be demonetized and withdrawn from circulation on 31 December 2019.
United Kingdom	20 February 2020	The Bank of England issued a £ 20 polymer banknote. This the third banknote in the new series.
Namibia	25 March 2020	The Bank of Namibia issued a 30 dollar polymer banknote to commemorate 30 years of independence.
Angola	7 July 2020	National Bank of Angola issued 200, 500, 1000, 2000 Kwanzas banknotes on polymer substrate.
Costa Rica	25 July 2020	The Banco Central de Costa Rica issued a new family of polymer banknote in denominations of 1000, 2000, 5000, 10,000 and 20,000 colones.
Trinidad and Tobago	30 September 2020	The Central Bank of Trinidad and Tobago issued a new polymer banknote family in denominations of 1, 5, 10, 20, 50 dollars.
Saudi Arabia	4 October 2020	The Saudi Arabian Monetary Authority has announced the 5-riyal banknote will be switched to polymer, replacing the current paper banknote, without any announcement on the other banknotes. The banknote was said to feature more environmentally friendly materials and additional security features, in addition to a much longer lifespan.
Uruguay	October 2020	The Central Bank of Uruguay replaced the commemorative 50 UYU polymer note in 2020 with a standard bill using the same design as the previous cotton note, as well as printing a 20 UYU polymer note.
Mexico	21 November 2020	The Banco de Mexico released a 100 peso polymer banknote as a part of the new Series G banknotes.
Lebanon	5 December 2020	The Banque du Liban released a £L100,000 polymer banknote in circulation to commemorate the centenary of the establishment of Greater Lebanon.
Cape Verde	8 January 2021	The Bank of Cape Verde introduced a new 200-escudo note like the preceding issue printed in polymer, but printed on cotton paper.
Botswana	22 February 2021	The Bank of Botswana printed a new version of the polymer 10-pula banknote, but this time featuring president Mokgweetsi Masisi.
United Kingdom	23 June 2021	The Bank of England issued a £ 50 polymer banknote, completing sterling's transition from paper to polymer notes. This the fourth and final Series G banknote to be issued.
Cook Islands	3 August 2021	The Cook Islands introduces a polymer $3 banknote featuring an illustration of "Ina and the Shark".
Romania	1 December 2021	The National bank of Romania introduced a new 20 lei banknote, depicting World War I hero Ecaterina Teodoroiu.
United Arab Emirates	7 December 2021	The Central Bank of the United Arab Emirates introduced the country's first polymer banknote – a redesigned Dh50 note to commemorate the golden jubilee of the country on 2 December 2021.
Barbados	21 March 2022	The Central Bank of Barbados announced its intent to replace the current paper banknotes with a newly designed polymer version by the end of the year. The new designs of the polymer banknotes were revealed on 4 May 2022 and the notes were rolled out 5 December 2022 as scheduled.
Thailand	24 March 2022	The Bank of Thailand started issuing ฿20 polymer banknotes bearing the image of Rama X. It is done to improve its quality as it is the most widely used banknote and hence it is prone to sustained damage.
Philippines	18 April 2022	The Bangko Sentral ng Pilipinas started issuing the 1000-piso polymer banknote, the country's first polymer banknote. These banknotes began the phased issuance to banks, with the release of a limited quantity.
United Arab Emirates	21 and 26 April 2022	The Central Bank of the United Arab Emirates started issuing new, redesigned Dh5 and Dh10 polymer currency notes. The 10-dirham banknote entered circulation on Thursday 21 April and the 5-dirham banknote entered circulation on Tuesday 26 April. Following that, it was announced that the Dh1000 note will also be replaced and circulation will start on the first half of 2023.
Egypt	6 July 2022	The Central Bank of Egypt started issuing the new LE10 banknote which has been planned since the year 2020. The existing version of the LE10 banknote printed on paper will continue to circulate in parallel with the new polymer banknotes.
Qatar	9 November 2022	The Qatar Central Bank announced a new 22-riyal banknote in commemoration of the 2022 FIFA World Cup, the first one ever held in the country and the Middle Eastern region as a whole.
Australia	February 2023	According to a press release dated 2 February 2023, the Reserve Bank of Australia has decided to replace the portrait of the late Queen Elizabeth II on the A$5 banknote with a design celebrating the First Australians instead of a portrait of King Charles III.
Poland	9 February 2023	The National Bank of Poland issued 100,000 20 zł banknotes to celebrate the 550th anniversary of the birth of scientist Nicolaus Copernicus.
Egypt	21 June 2023	Almost one year after the release of the new LE10 polymer banknote, the Central Bank of Egypt issued the new LE20 polymer banknotes. Just like the paper LE10 notes, the paper versions of the LE20 note will co-circulate with the new polymer version.
Jamaica	18 July 2023	The Bank of Jamaica officially released a new banknote series that had been planned since the end of May 2022, and the new polymer series includes a $2000 note. This introduction of the new denomination is done to bridge the gap between the $1000 and $5000 denominations, reduce the number of notes needed for multi-thousand-dollar transactions, and eventually reduce costs for the central bank, due to a lower reliance on the $1000 note.
Solomon Islands	27 October 2023	According to a press release, the Central Bank of Solomon Islands announced the release of a new SI$10 banknote to commemorate the 2023 Pacific Games held in Honiara, which was the first time the country hosted the Pacific Games, held from 19 November to 2 December 2023.
United Arab Emirates	30 November 2023	The Central Bank of the United Arab Emirates started issuing a new polymer version of the Dh500 banknote.
Tonga	4 December 2023	The National Reserve Bank of Tonga released a new family of six banknotes (ranging from 2 to 100 paʻanga), with the 5- and 10- paʻanga being polymer. This new series was released on 4 December, the birthday of King Tupou I.
Samoa	December 2023	The Central Bank of Samoa started issuing new polymer versions of their 5-, 10-, and 20-tālā banknotes.
United Kingdom	5 June 2024	After the passing of Queen Elizabeth II on 8 September 2022, the Bank of England announced in November the same year that new banknotes featuring the portrait of King Charles III would be issued in mid-2024. Those notes were issued for circulation on 5 June 2024.
Mozambique	16 June 2024	The Bank of Mozambique announced that new 20-, 50-, and 100-metical banknotes would be issued to replace those which have been in circulation since 2011.
Organisation of Eastern Caribbean States	June 2024	According to an announcement by the Eastern Caribbean Central Bank in February 2024, a new EC$50 banknote would be released to commemorate the 50th anniversary of Grenada's independence from the United Kingdom in June 2024.
Thailand	23 July 2024	The Bank of Thailand issued 10,000,000 commemorative ฿100 banknotes to celebrate the 72nd birthday of King Rama X.
Bermuda	Fall 2024	Following the death of Queen Elizabeth II, the Bermuda Monetary Authority announced that new banknotes featuring the effigy of King Charles III would enter circulation. However, for the redesigned series, only 2- and 5-dollar notes would enter circulation in Fall 2024. The new notes would retain the familiar design of the circulating banknotes.
Philippines	19 December 2024	The Bangko Sentral ng Pilipinas revealed the designs for the 50, 100 and 500 piso polymer Banknotes of the Philippine peso during a presentation to President Bongbong Marcos, who led the unveiling ceremony in Malacañang.
Falkland Islands	14 August 2025	On Falklands Day 2025, the government of the Falkland Islands released a new series of banknotes (£5, £10 and £20) made from polymer, featuring Charles III.
Thailand	21 November 2025	The Bank of Thailand started issuing ฿50 and ฿100 polymer banknotes bearing the image of Rama X. It is done to improve its quality as it is the most widely used banknote and hence it is prone to sustained damage, similar to ฿20 polymer banknote.
Turkmenistan	1 December 2025	On Neutrality Year 2025, the Central Bank of Turkmenistan released a new series of banknotes (1, 5, 10, and 200) made from polymer.
Saint Helena	January 2026	A series of £5, £10 and £20 banknotes of the Saint Helena pound is set to feature Charles III.
Guernsey	2027	Guernsey is expected to release a series of £1, £5, £10 and £20 notes in 2027.

== See also ==
- Banknotes of the Australian dollar
- Banknotes of the Canadian dollar
- Banknotes of the New Zealand dollar
- CSIRO
- Hybrid Paper Polymer Banknote
- Polymers
