= Dyce (disambiguation) =

Dyce is a suburb of Aberdeen, Scotland.

Dyce may also refer to:

- Dyce station (Manitoba), a train station in Dyce, Manitoba, Canada
- Dyce Academy, a school in Dyce, Scotland
- Dyce railway station, Dyce, Scotland

== People with the surname Dyce ==
- Alexander Dyce (1798–1869), Scottish dramatic editor and literary historian
- Charles Andrew Dyce (1816–1853), Singaporean artist
- Keith Dyce (1926–2014) Dean of the Dick Vet School in Edinburgh
- William Dyce (1806–1864), Scottish artist

== See also ==
- Dice (disambiguation)
- Isla St Clair (née Dyce)
