= Intelligent banknote neutralisation system =

System for marking stolen banknotes

An intelligent banknote neutralisation system (IBNS) is a security system that is used by banks, ATMs, retail establishments, vending machines and the cash-in-transit industry, to render stolen funds unusable and easily identifiable. Dye packs are inserted between bills in random bundles. If a bundle containing a dye pack is removed from a specified area (e.g. taken out of bank doors), it explodes, releasing an indelible dye and possible array of additional chemicals. The conspicuous, brightly colored (usually red) stains on the bills allow quick, easy visual recognition of stolen money. Tracers and markers can also be added to the ink or bonding agent providing forensic evidence linking the criminal to the crime. Bonding agents (glues) have been used more recently.

Stained bills cannot be brought back into circulation easily, because they are visually and/or forensically linked quickly to the crime scene. Restricted procedures are globally in place in case of an attempt to exchange them at any financial institutions.

== History ==
In Europe, the design of intelligent systems to protect valuables began in 1980. The overall goal was to create a secure system to provide additional security for cash-in-transit. The very first IBNS prototype using coloured smoke as neutralisation agent was invented by Spinnaker International Ltd in 1982. This made use of lightweight and easy to use containers. In 1990, the first case of safety ink as a neutralizing agent was accepted to be used in soft-skinned vehicles.

At the same time, in Sweden, IBNS systems manufactured by Spinnaker were being used in non-armoured and partially armoured vehicles, demonstrating that this was a viable alternative to cash transportation with armoured trucks. The Swedish market decided to progress with IBNS boxes for cash transport.

In 1991, France changed its regulations to allow the use of IBNS in soft-skinned vehicles. The French CIT company VALTIS was the first to implement such a system to service three regional banks. In 2002, Bank of France implemented an international procedure to treat and exchange neutralized banknotes for CIT professionals.

In 2003, the European Central Bank made a decision that defined the process and cost of exchanging neutralized Euro Banknotes among all National Central Banks in Europe. The decision was repealed 2013. In 2005, Bank of France implemented a special procedure regarding the treatment of stained banknotes deposited by private persons. In 2007, Sweden implemented a national regulation making the use of IBNS by CIT obligatory. The same year, the Belgian government also implemented a national regulation imposing the use of IBNS for cash-in-transit.

In 2010, the European Commission finalized a European regulation to harmonize cross-border cash transportation by road. The use of non-armoured vehicles in combination with IBNS is one of two accepted methods of transportation.

== Concept ==
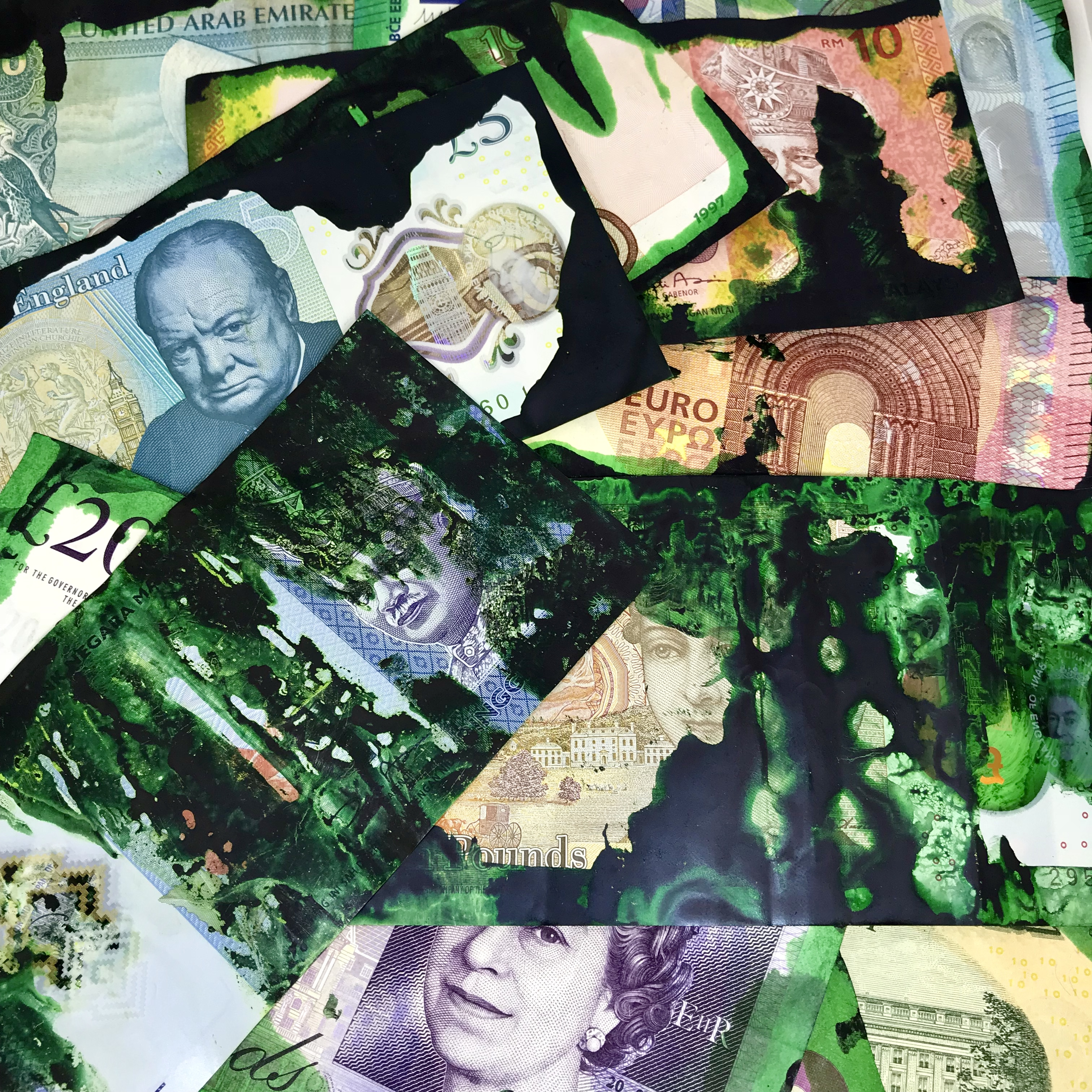
Money stained with a permanent security ink

The concept of an IBNS is based upon the notion that criminals seek to maximize their reward while minimizing the potential cost of the crime. Intelligent Banknote Neutralisation Systems remove the anticipated reward of the crime and increase the risk of being caught. Reducing the reward of the crime is done by permanently marking the cash as stolen with an indelible security ink or bonding agent. Tracers and markers added to the ink or bonding agent provide forensic evidence linking the criminal to the crime scene, increasing the risk of being caught.

== Dye pack ==
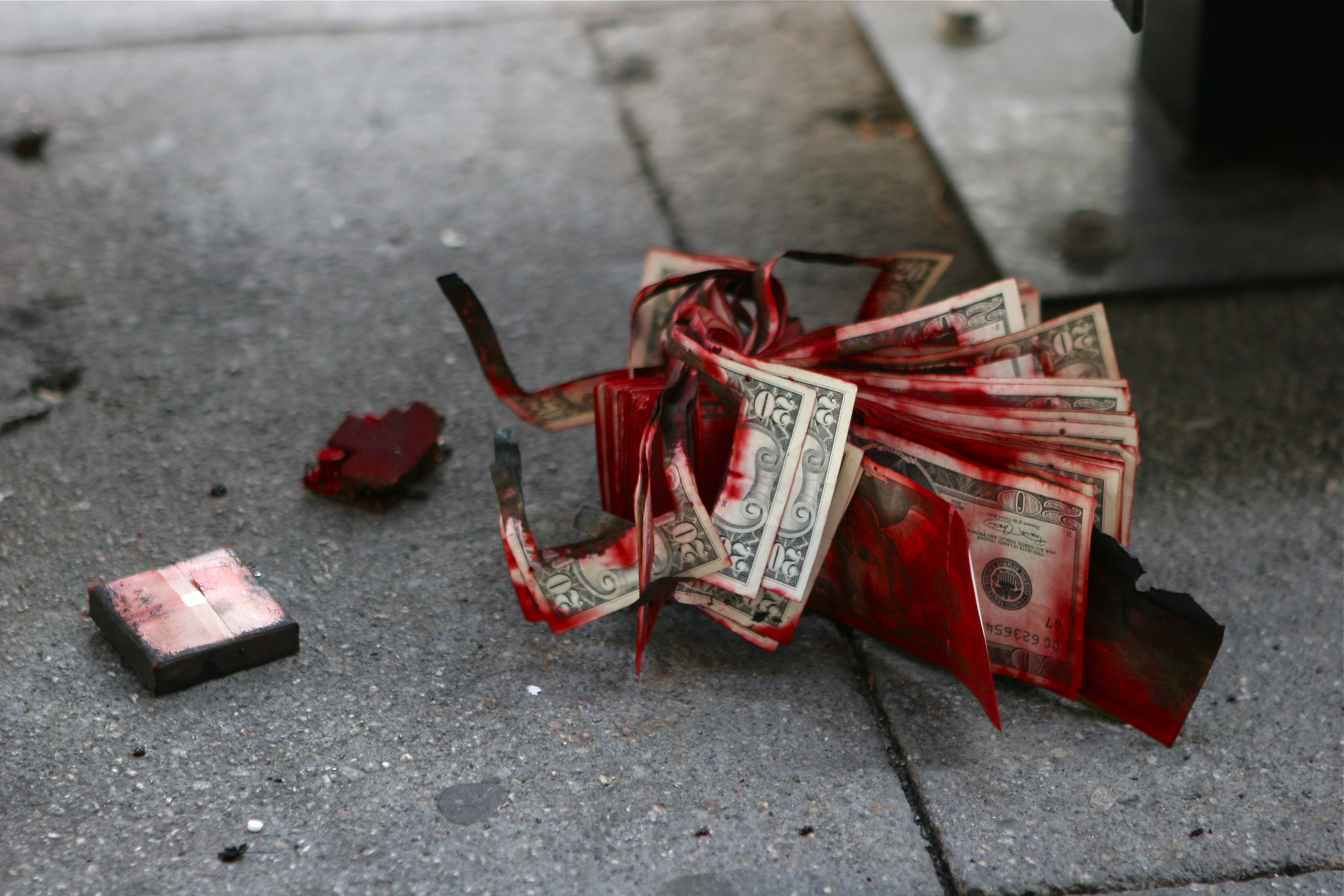
Deployed dye pack

A dye pack is a radio-controlled device used by banks to foil a robbery by causing stolen cash to be permanently marked with dye. The technology was invented in the United States in Georgia, in 1965. In most cases, a dye pack is placed in a hollowed-out space within a stack of banknotes, usually $10 or $20 bills. This stack of bills looks and feels identical to a real one, but usually subtly marked in a way that is only privy to selected bank employees. The development of flexible dye packs makes it virtually impossible to detect by persons handling the stack.

A stack of bills fitted with a dye pack is generally stored next to a magnetic plate at a bank teller's workstation. Under these conditions, it remains in standby or safe mode until a bank employee removes it from the plate and hands it to a robber, causing it to become armed. Once the pack is taken out of the building, a radio transmitter located at the door triggers a timer (typically at least 10 seconds), after which the dye pack explosively releases an aerosol (usually of Disperse Red 9) and sometimes tear gas. The release is intended to mark the money and/or the robber's body with a brightly colored stain so that they can be easily recognized as having been involved in a crime. Depending on the specific contents of the pack, the release may incapacitate the robber and/or destroy the money as well. The chemical reaction causing the explosion of the pack and the release of the dye creates high temperatures of about 200 °C (400 °F) which further discourages a criminal from touching the pack or removing it from the bag or getaway vehicle. Dye packs are used to foil robberies in over 75% of banks in the U.S.

== Legislation and regulations ==
The use of IBNS is usually regulated by the presence or absence of a legal structure (legislation and regulations) as well as the legal conditions applying to the private security sector. Following are examples of the types of legal regulation pertaining to the neutralisation of national banknotes practised by the National Central Banks of various countries:

- Countries which permit the use of IBNS without legal or professional regulation or other restriction: Austria, Bosnia, Estonia, Latvia, Lithuania, the Netherlands, Slovenia, Switzerland, and the UK.
- Countries with legal regulation which permits the use of IBNS upon citing the regulation: Denmark, Finland, Netherlands, and Norway.
- Countries with legal regulation which permits the use of IBNS by technical agreement: Belgium, Croatia, France, Germany, Hungary, Ireland, Italy, Luxembourg, Portugal, and Sweden.
- Countries with legal regulation forbidding the unrestricted use of IBNS: Singapore, Poland, and Romania.
- Countries which forbid the neutralising of national banknotes either by legal regulation or by internal regulation of their national central bank: Argentina, Chile, Egypt, Indonesia, Paraguay, the Philippines, and Thailand.

== See also ==
- Ink tag
- Security bag
