= Dies (surname) =

Dies is a surname of Dutch, Flemish, and Frisian origin. It is a modification of "Th(ew)ys" or "Thees", itself a modification of "Matthias". Notable people with this surname include:

- Albert Christoph Dies (1755–1822), German painter, composer, and biographer
- Josh Dies (born 1983), American singer, songwriter, musician and author
- Martin Dies Jr. (1900–1972), Texas politician
- Martin Dies Sr. (1870–1922), Texas politician
