= Alaskan parchment scrip =

Scrip in circulation from 1816 to 1867

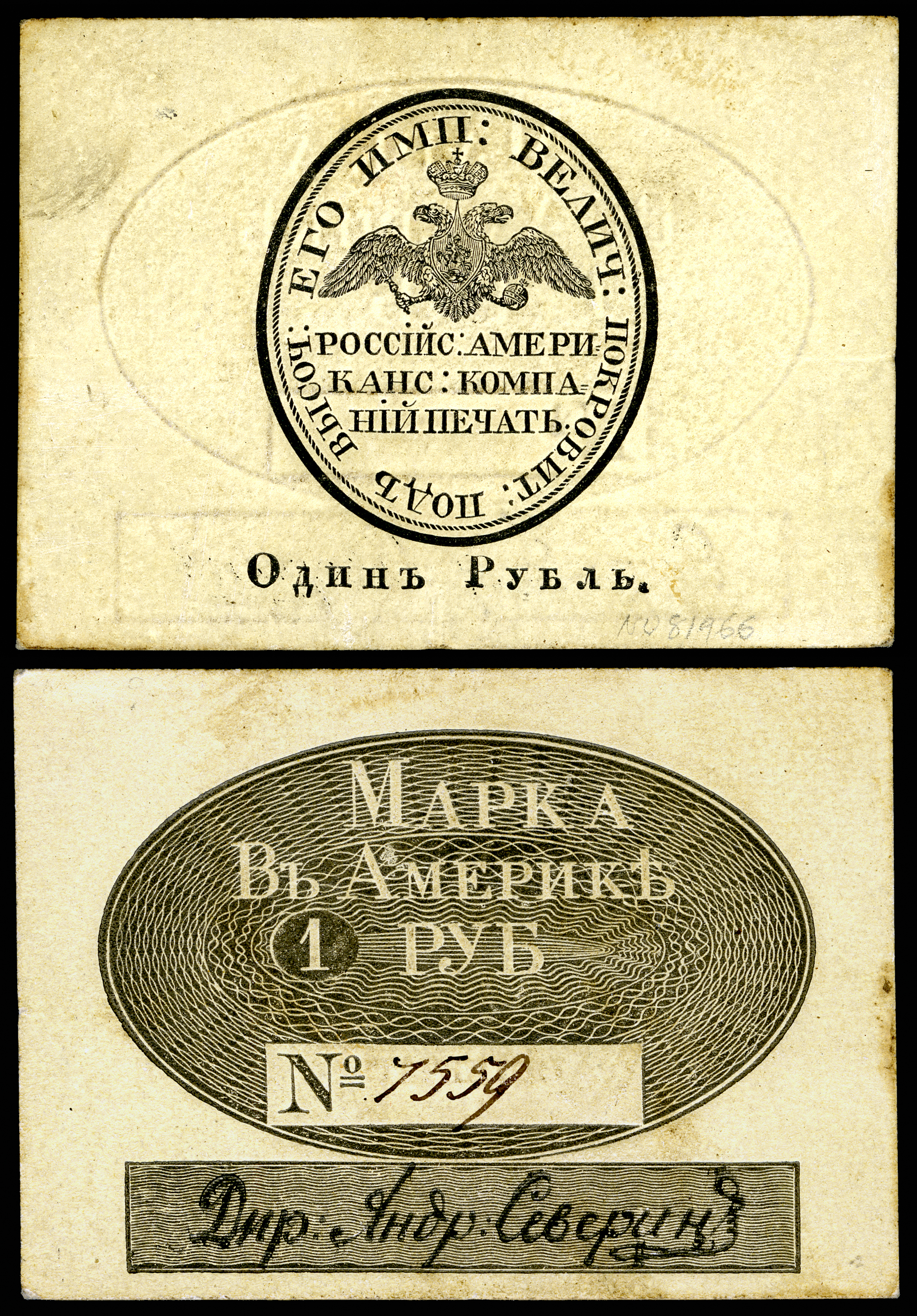
Russian-American Company parchment scrip (1 ruble)

Alaskan parchment scrip was in circulation from 1816 to 1867, issued by the Russian-American Company (RAC) in the colony of Russian America. Also known as seal skin or walrus skin notes, this type of scrip was printed on parchment, and sometimes on walrus hide, in denominations of 10, 25, 50 kopecks and 1, 5, 10, and 25 rubles.

== Russian-American Company currency ==
The Russian-American Company (RAC) (full name: the Russian-American Company under the Protection of His Imperial Majesty) was chartered by Russian emperor Paul I on 8 July 1799. This 20-year charter granted the RAC an exclusive monopoly for any and all produce from (primarily the fur trade) as well as the general administration of colonial Russian America. Each of the five main districts, namely New Archangel, Kodiak, Unalaska, Ross, and Northern Islands, housed a RAC store which only accepted company scrip, and charged a 35% markup on basic commodities.

RAC employees and local native hunters were paid in company scrip redeemable only at company stores. Though first made of thick card stock, this scrip was later made from parchment, and walrus hide.

=== Scrip Issues ===
Issuance records for RAC scrip (Note: All information in the issuance table is found in Zander (1996). Individual table references indicate additional reference sources for specific information.)
Issue	Amount	Material	Denom
1816	12,000	Card stock	25 & 50K; 1, 5, 10R
1822	30,000	Card stock	
1826	30,000	Parchment	10, 25, 50K; 1, 5, 10R
1834		Parchment	
1842	41,662	Parchment	
1846	20,300	Parchment	
1848		Parchment	
1852		Parchment	
1858	80,000	Parchment	

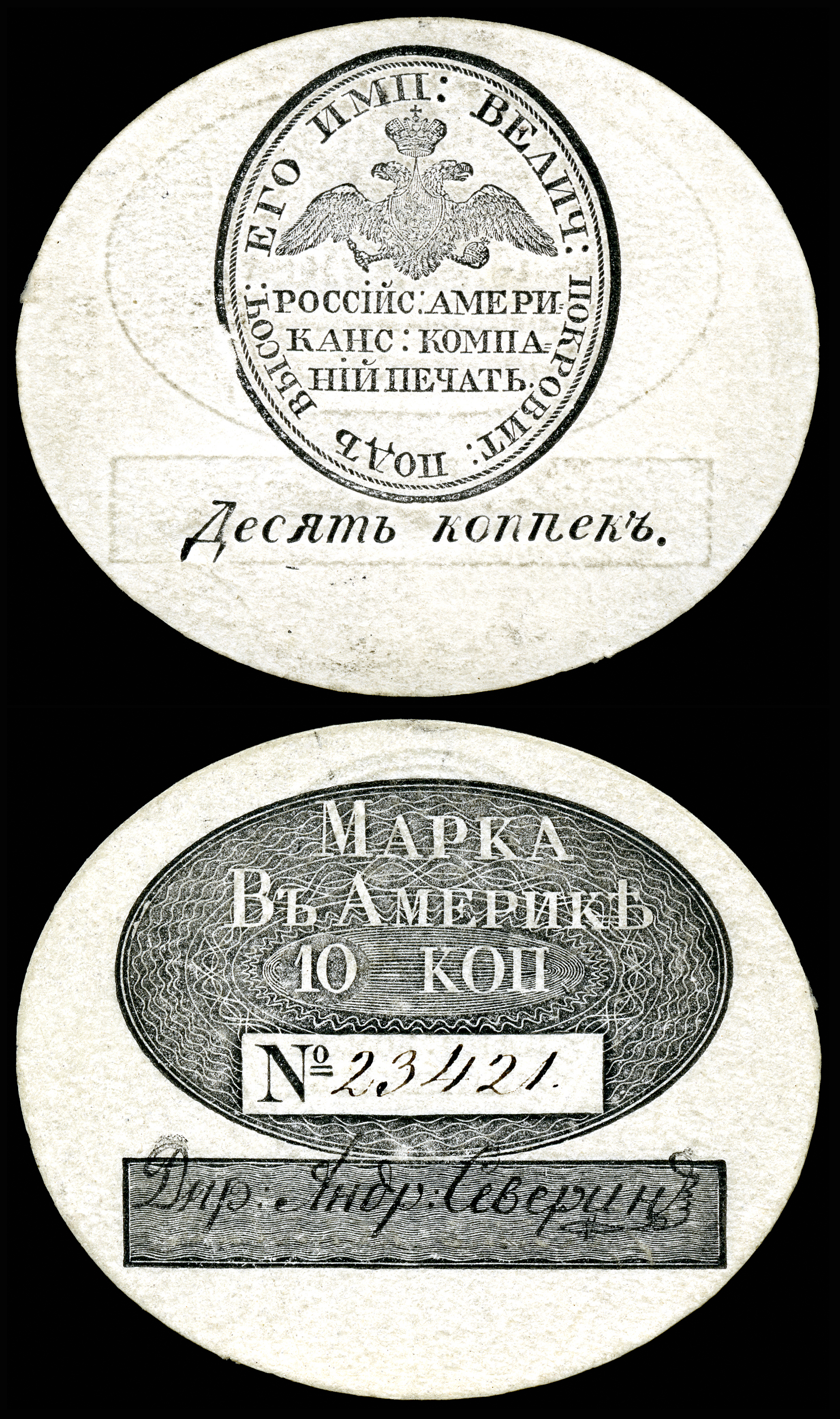
One-issue only round 10 kopeck note.

In 1803, Alexander Andreyevich Baranov, one of the directors of the RAC, proposed the creation of a colonial currency for use in Russian America, to be printed on parchment for greater durability. The first issue of currency (12,000 rubles) did not arrive until 1816, and it was printed on a heavy card stock. A second issue arrived in 1822, printed on the same material. Given the climate of Alaska and constantly being outdoors, the currency did not survive long in circulation. Only four examples from the first two issues are known to exist: a 25 kopeck, 50 kopeck, and one ruble note from 1816 and a single one ruble note from 1822.

Constantly needing to replace damaged and worn notes, a third issue (on parchment) arrived in 1826, with higher denomination notes on color-tinted parchment (e.g., blue 5 ruble notes and red 10 ruble notes). Later issues (e.g., 1842, 1846, 1848) varied the ink overprint color for each denomination: 10 kopeck (brown), 25 kopeck (black), 50 kopeck (lilac), 1 ruble (green), 5 ruble (blue ink on blue-tinted parchment), 10 ruble (red ink on red-tinted parchment). The issue of 1852 changed the color scheme of the ruble notes: black ink on light yellow (1 ruble), black ink on blue (5 ruble), and black ink on red (10 ruble).

Lower denomination notes – 10, 25, and 50 kopeck notes – were the same size (except for the one-issue round 10 kopeck note). In an attempt to help the largely illiterate native population of Russian America, these lower denomination notes were systematically altered: the 10 kopeck had two holes made, one in each of the upper corners, the 25 kopeck had all four corners clipped, and the 50 kopeck had the upper two corners clipped.

=== Census ===
Ted Uhl, a collector and researcher of Alaskan parchment scrip, reported that 53 notes were known in 1982. Zander's 1996 monograph published by The Russian Numismatic Society lists every reported note by denomination and serial number: 10 kopecks (22), 25 kopecks (18), 50 kopecks (10), one ruble (18), five rubles (3), 10 rubles (5), and 25 rubles (1) for a census total of 77. (Note: Zander further reports that of the 77 known examples, 35 reside in museum collections.) It is uncertain whether an accurate census is currently maintained, but some estimates suggest between 100 and 150 notes are known.

== Bibliography ==
- Andrews, C.L. (1916). "Alaska under the Russians – Industry, Trade and Social Life". The Washington Historical Quarterly. 7 (4). University of Washington: 278–295. JSTOR 40474449.
- Bickford, Ethan (24 July 2012). "Animal Skin Tokens – The Russian-American Company". Paper Money Guaranty.
- Gibson, James R. (1976). "Russian America in 1821". Oregon Historical Quarterly. 77 (2). Oregon Historical Society: 174–188. JSTOR 20613514.
- Lightfoot, Kent G. (2003). "The Implications of Mercantile Colonial Practices in the North Pacific". Historical Archaeology. 37 (4). Society for Historical Archaeology: 14–28. doi:10.1007/BF03376620. JSTOR 25617092. S2CID 161006359.
- Uhl, Ted (1982). "Walrus Skin Money". Paper Money. 21 (1). The Society of Paper Money Collectors: 20–23.
- Veltre, Douglas W.; McCartney, Allen P. (2002). "Russian Exploitation of Aleuts and Fur Seals: The Archaeology of Eighteenth- and Early Nineteenth-Century Settlements in the Pribilof Islands, Alaska". Historical Archaeology. 36 (3). Society for Historical Archaeology: 8–17. doi:10.1007/BF03374356. JSTOR 25617008. S2CID 163434459.
- Wheeler, Mary E. (1966). "The Origins of the Russian-American Company". Jahrbücher für Geschichte Osteuropas. 14 (4). Franz Steiner Verlag: 485–494. JSTOR 41042948.
- Zander, Randolph (1996). The Alaskan Parchment Script of the Russian American Company, 1816–1867. Bellingham, WA: The Russian Numismatic Society. OCLC 42245543.
- "White deer skins". The Numismatist. 24 (4). American Numismatic Association: 139. 1911.
- HCAA Currency Auction Catalog (Boston). Heritage Auctions, Inc. 2010. p. 115. ISBN 978-1599674797.
