= Bradvek =

Bradvek was a form of Tyvek polymer, produced by DuPont. It was used for printing one of the first polymer banknotes in 1983 for the Isle of Man by the American Banknote Company.

== See also ==
- Bradbury Wilkinson and Company
