= Parah Dice =

Turkish-German record producer

Parah Dice is a Turkish (according to his profile on Spotify, Turkish) DJ and record producer.

== Career ==
The Russian music portal TopHit calls Parah Dice "one of the most mysterious German musicians" (Although he is not German.) According to Dance-Charts.de, he "has worked as a ghost producer for well-known DJs for many years" before "deciding to make a name for himself".

He released his first official single, titled "Hot", on June 28, 2019 via the record label musicTap. The second title, "Summer", followed in July.

The next single, "Everybody's Scared", featured Holy Molly on vocals.

== Discography ==
=== Singles ===
Title	Year	Charts
Title	Year	CIS^{*}
"Hot"	2019	11
"Summer" (with Veronica Bravo)	2019	—
"Everybody's Scared" (with Holy Molly)	2019	—

- The TopHit Top Radio & YouTube Hits chart is based on airplay on radio stations in Russia, as well as Russian-language radio stations all over the world (in Ukraine, the CIS countries, the Baltic states, Cyprus, Israel, Germany, the United States, and Canada) and on YouTube plays.
