= Banknotes of Northern Ireland =

Banknotes have been issued for use specifically in Northern Ireland since 1929, and are denominated in pounds sterling. They are legal currencies, but not legal tender anywhere in the United Kingdom. However, the banknotes are still widely accepted as currency by larger merchants and institutions elsewhere in the United Kingdom. Issuing banks have been granted legal rights to issue currency, and back the notes with deposits at the Bank of England.

The issuing of banknotes in Northern Ireland is regulated by the Currency and Bank Notes Act 1928, the Coinage Act 1971, Banknotes (Ireland) Act 1864 (c. 78), Banknotes (Ireland) Act 1920 (c. 24), Bankers (Ireland) Act 1845, Bankers (Northern Ireland) Act 1928 (c. 15), among others.

Pursuant to some of these statutes, His Majesty's Revenue and Customs (HMRC) publishes in the Belfast Gazette an account of "the Amount of Notes authorised by Law to be issued by the several Banks of Issue in Northern Ireland, and the Average Amount of Notes in Circulation, and of Bank of England Notes and Coin held".

On 27 February 2019, Ulster Bank and Bank of Ireland released new polymer £5 and £10 notes and Danske Bank, trading as Northern Bank, released new polymer £10 notes. On 29 September 2023, paper £50 and £100 notes issued by the Bank of Ireland and by Ulster Bank, like those of the Scottish bank note issuers, were replaced with polymer banknotes. Paper notes will be exchangeable or redeemable at bank branches.

== Current banknote issuers ==
- Bank of Ireland – 1929–present
- Ulster Bank – 1929–present
- Danske Bank – 2013–present (Note: The Northern Bank was rebranded with the name of its parent company, Danske Bank, in 2012. Danske Bank notes were first issued in Northern Ireland in June 2013.)

== Former banknote issuers ==
- Northern Bank – 1929–2013
  - Belfast Banking Company – 1929–1968 (Note: Acquired by Northern Bank in 1970.)
- Allied Irish Bank – 1981–1993 (Note: The Provincial Bank of Ireland was renamed Allied Irish Banks in 1982, and then became the First Trust Bank in 1994, when AIB merged its Northern Ireland operations with those of TSB. After rebranding back to Allied Irish in 2019, the bank withdrew its banknote issues in 2022.)
- First Trust Bank – 1993–2021
  - National Bank – 1929–1959 (Note: Acquired by Bank of Ireland in 1965.)
  - Provincial Bank of Ireland – 1929–1981

== Denominations ==
Notes were initially issued in denominations of 1, 5, 10, 20, 50 and 100 pounds. Of these denominations, only the 1 pound has ceased to be issued by all banks, with the last produced by the Allied Irish Banks in 1984. The 5-pound note is only issued now by Bank of Ireland and Ulster Bank, and Northern Bank stopped issuing notes over £20 when it was rebranded as Danske Bank.

=== Bank of Ireland notes ===
A £5 Sterling note issued by Bank of Ireland in Northern Ireland

Until April 2008, all Bank of Ireland notes featured Queen's University of Belfast on the reverse side. A new series of £5, £10 and £20 notes was issued in May 2008, all featuring an illustration of the Old Bushmills Distillery, and these notes will gradually replace the previous series.

The various denominations are differentiated by their colour and size:

- 5 pound note, blue
- 10 pound note, pink
- 20 pound note, green
- 50 pound note, blue-green
- 100 pound note, red.

=== First Trust Bank notes ===
A £100 First Trust Bank note

First Trust Bank is a subsidiary of the Allied Irish Banks (AIB). AIB was originally formed in 1966 from a merger of a group of smaller banks. Following this merger, banknotes issued by the Provincial Bank of Ireland were reissued with the Allied Irish Banks name. In 1991, AIB merged with TSB Northern Ireland and began trading as the First Trust Bank, and since then, the bank's notes have been issued under the First Trust Bank name.

First Trust Bank's current notes have a generic depiction of a Northern Irish person. A young middle-aged man appears on the £10 note, an elderly woman on the £20 note, an elderly man on the £50 note, and finally both elderly people together on the £100 note. Prior to 1994, the elderly man featured on the £100 note. The obverse designs generally feature images associated with the Spanish Armada, commemorating the wrecking of 24 Armada ships off the coast of County Antrim in 1588:

- 10-pound note featuring the ship Girona
- 20-pound note featuring the chimney at Lacada Point, Giant's Causeway, near Dunluce, County Antrim, where the Girona was wrecked
- 50-pound note featuring a commemorative medal (first introduced in 1994)
- 100-pound note featuring the Spanish Armada.

A £5 note featuring Dunluce Castle on the obverse and a £1 note also featuring the Girona were issued by the Provincial Bank of Ireland and by AIB, but have not been issued by First Trust Bank. The reverse featured a young woman, and a boy, respectively.

In February 2019, First Trust Bank ceased issuing its own banknotes in circulation and replaced them with Bank of England banknotes as they are withdrawn from circulation. All First Trust Bank notes continued to be used until 30 June 2022, after which time they ceased to be legal currency.

=== Danske Bank/Northern Bank notes ===
A pre-robbery Northern Bank £20 note

A £20 note of the post-2004 reissue, bearing the old Northern Bank branding

A 2013 Danske Bank £10 note

Following the theft in 2004 of £26.5 million in banknotes from Northern Bank's headquarters and cash-handling centre in Belfast, of which approximately £15.5m was the then current-series Northern Bank issue, the bank announced on 7 January 2005 that it would withdraw almost all of its notes from circulation and replace them with altered designs, including an updated version of the bank's logo. The reissue began on 14 March 2005 and was scheduled to take one month; old notes remain exchangeable at branches of Northern Bank.

In 2012, Northern Bank adopted the name of its Copenhagen-based parent company Danske Bank Group and now trades as Danske Bank. Northern Bank had previously been a subsidiary of the Midland Bank and subsequently National Australia Bank, and its banknote design has changed over the years as the company changed hands.

In June 2013, the bank issued a new series of £10 and £20 notes bearing the new Danske Bank name in place of Northern Bank; at the same time it also announced that it would cease production of £50 and £100 notes, supplying Bank of England notes instead. Older notes bearing the Northern Bank name will continue in circulation for some time as they are gradually withdrawn, and remain acceptable forms of payment.

Most Danske Bank banknotes depict a range of notable people associated with industry in Northern Ireland on the obverse. The reverse of each note has an illustration of the portico of Belfast City Hall, sculpted by F. W. Pomeroy. The principal colours of Northern Bank notes of greater than £5 face value were changed with the 2005 reissue, and are now (former colour in pre-2004 column):

Denomination	Illustration	Pre-2004	Post-2004
£5	the US Space Shuttle (polymer note)	green	–
£10	J. B. Dunlop	brown	green
£20	Harry Ferguson	purple	blue
£50	Sir Samuel Cleland Davidson	green	purple
£100	Sir James Martin	black	red

In addition to the standard series, Northern Bank briefly issued £5 notes commemorating the year 2000. These were printed by the Canadian Bank Note Company in Ottawa on Australian-made polymer substrate rather than paper, and were the first polymer notes to circulate anywhere in the UK. (Note: An alternate form of plastic substrate derived from DuPont's Tyvek and branded "Bradvek" was used by printers Bradbury Wilkinson and Company to produce £1 notes for the Isle of Man between 1983 and 1988, but though the island is a Crown Dependency it is not part of the UK.) Because of the small number produced, these notes were also the only Northern Bank notes that were not recalled following the 2004 robbery.

=== Ulster Bank notes ===
An Ulster Bank £20 note featuring the older NatWest arrowheads device.

A commemorative Ulster Bank note. The other side is similar to the standard five-pound note

==== 2007 issue ====
Ulster Bank's last paper notes all share a rather plain design of a view of Belfast Harbour flanked by landscape views; the design of the reverse is dominated by the bank's coat of arms. The principal difference between the denominations is their colour and size. Notes issued from 1 January 2007 feature the Royal Bank of Scotland "daisy wheel" logo, adopted by Ulster Bank in 2005:

- 5-pound note, grey
- 10-pound note, blue-green
- 20-pound note, purple
- 50-pound note, blue

In November 2006, Ulster Bank issued its first commemorative banknote – an issue of one million £5 notes commemorating the first anniversary of the death of Northern Irish footballer George Best. This was the first Ulster Bank banknote to incorporate their new logo and the entire issue was taken by collectors within hours of becoming available in bank branches.

==== 2019–20 issue ====
Ulster Bank released a new series of polymer vertical banknotes in 2019 and 2020, replacing all of it its paper notes that were in circulation.

As part of the transfer of the business of Ulster Bank Limited to National Westminster Bank PLC that was completed on 3 May 2021, in 2020 the right to issue banknotes was transferred from Ulster Bank Limited to National Westminster Bank PLC on 30 June 2020.

== See also ==
- Banknotes of the pound sterling
- Banknotes of Ireland
- Banknotes of Scotland
