= Bank Notes (Ireland) Act 1920 =

Act of the Parliament of the United Kingdom

Bank Notes (Ireland) Act 1920 (Note: Section 2.)
- Act of Parliament
- Parliament of the United Kingdom
- Long title: An Act to amend the Law with respect to the Place of Payment of Notes issued by Banks of Issue in Ireland.
- Citation: 10 & 11 Geo. 5. c. 24
- Territorial extent: United Kingdom

Dates
- Royal assent: 4 August 1920
- Commencement: 4 August 1920 (Note: The Acts of Parliament (Commencement) Act 1793.)
Other legislation
Repeals/revokes	Bank Notes (Ireland) Act 1828; Bank Notes (Ireland) Act 1830
Amended by	Statute Law Revision Act 1927

Status: Amended

Text of statute as originally enacted

Revised text of statute as amended

Text of the Bank Notes (Ireland) Act 1920 as in force today (including any amendments) within the United Kingdom, from legislation.gov.uk.

The Bank Notes (Ireland) Act 1920 (10 & 11 Geo. 5. c. 24) is an act of the Parliament of the United Kingdom which removed any obligation for a bank of issue in Ireland to pay, on demand, any of its notes bearing a date before 4 August 1920, except at the bank's head office in Ireland.

== Background ==
Since 1828, under the Bank Notes (Ireland) Act 1828 (9 Geo. 4. c. 81), banks in Ireland were obliged to cover any redemptions of pound sterling banknotes they had issued at any branch. This legally required individual branches to physically hold excessive amounts of legal tender to cover any redemption. In 1920, six Irish banks (Bank of Ireland, Provincial Bank of Ireland, Belfast Banking Company, Northern Banking Company, Ulster Bank, and National Bank) wrote to the Parliament of the United Kingdom of Great Britain and Ireland asking to be relieved of this obligation. They felt the requirement was excessive in view of the greater number of branches in 1920 and the improvements in communications, compared to 1828.

The act provided that any Irish sterling banknotes issued by the banks were only required to be redeemed for legal tender at the individual bank's head office or at another branch the bank designated for this purpose (for example for banks whose head offices were outside of Ireland).

== Repeals ==
The act was repealed in its entirety in the Irish Free State by the Currency Act, 1927. Section 2 of the Bank Notes (Ireland) Act, which repealed the obligation for banknotes to be redeemed at the branch where they were issued, was repealed by the Statute Law Revision Act 1927 but the rest of the act remains in force in the United Kingdom.
