= Ulster Bank £100 note =

One hundred pounds
- Country: Northern Ireland
- Value: £100 sterling
- Width: 163 mm
- Height: 90 mm
- Security features: watermark, security thread, microprinting, fluorescent ink, raised print, security hologram
- Material used: paper
- Years of printing: 1990–

Obverse
- Design: Ulster landscape, Belfast Harbour, Giant's Causeway, flax plants, Celtic knot

Reverse
- Design: Ulster Bank coat of arms, arms of the provinces of Ireland

The Ulster Bank £100 note is a banknote issued by Ulster Bank. It is valued at one hundred pounds sterling and the current design was first issued in 1990. As with most banknotes of Northern Ireland, they can be used for transactions in the Isle of Man and Great Britain, but in practice most retailers will not accept them and they are not legal tender in England or Wales, nor are they in Northern Ireland or Scotland where no banknotes, including Bank of England ones are legal tender.

== Design ==
The £100 note very similar to the Ulster Bank £50 note, except that it is navy blue in colour and is slightly larger. The obverse side features the Ulster landscape, with Belfast Harbour, the Giant's Causeway, flax plants and Celtic knot patterns. The reverse shows the Ulster Bank coat of arms, and the arms of the provinces of Ireland.
