= Assembly Rooms, Belfast =

Building in Belfast, Northern Ireland

Coordinates: 54°36′03.2″N 5°55′41.1″W

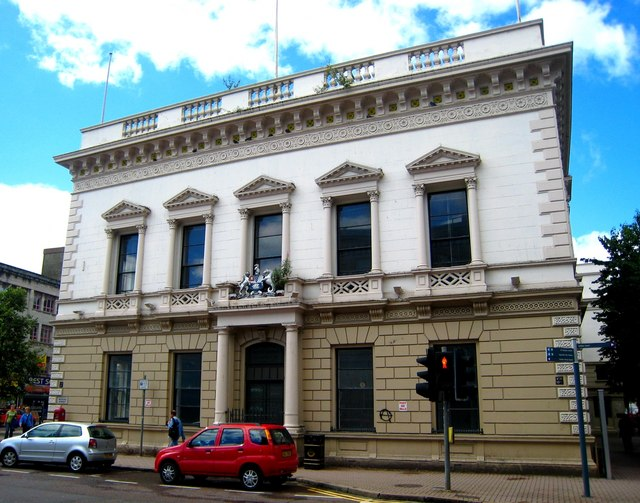
Front elevation in 2007

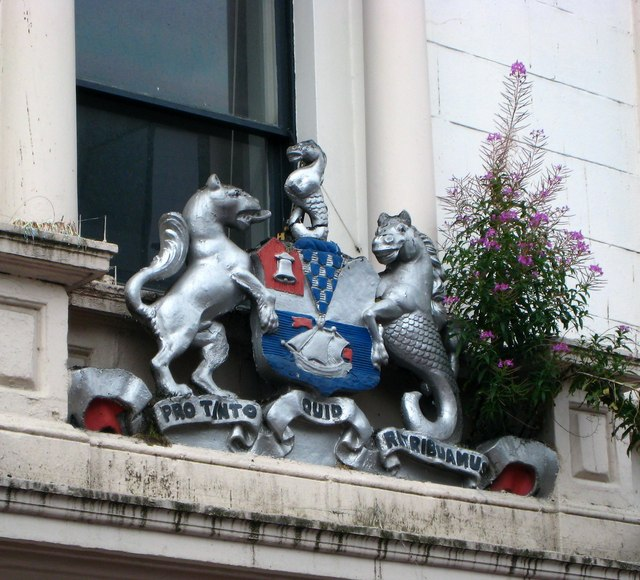
City coat of arms above the entrance

The Assembly Rooms is a Grade B1 listed building in Belfast, Northern Ireland. It was built, as the single-storey Exchange, in 1769 by Arthur Chichester, 1st Marquess of Donegall. The Marquess expanded to a second floor in 1776 and the building came to be known by its current name. It housed the Belfast Harp Festival of 1792, public meetings and, following the Irish Rebellion of 1798, the court martial of rebel leaders.

The building was converted into the Head Office of the Belfast Banking Company in 1845. It was extended several times and received listed building protection in 1975. The bank, now part of Northern Bank since 1970, vacated the building in 2000. Since then the structure has only been occasionally used and has been subject to vandalism. It is on the Northern Ireland Buildings at Risk Register and the watchlist of the World Monuments Fund.

== Exchange and Assembly Rooms ==
The structure was built in 1769 by Arthur Chichester, 1st Marquess of Donegall as a celebration of the birth of his son, George Augustus. The structure, designated The Exchange, was single storey in the neo-classical style and cost the Marquess £4,000 (equivalent to £701,082 in 2023). The Marquess ordered an extension, to two storeys, in 1776. This was designed by the English architect Robert Taylor and cost £7,000 (equivalent to £1,190,809 in 2023). Following the extension the building became known as the Assembly Rooms.

In 1786 a meeting at the Assembly Rooms rejected a plan to establish an Ulster-based slave trading company. In July 1792 the building hosted the Belfast Harp Festival. After the Irish Rebellion of 1798 rebel leader Henry Joy McCracken and others were court-martialled and sentenced to death in the Assembly Rooms. The building is located on the "four corners" from which road distances to Belfast were once measured.

== Bank Head Office ==
In 1845 the Assembly Rooms were extended and converted by Charles Lanyon for use as the Head Office of the Belfast Banking Company, this included rendering the exterior in stucco. The structure was extended in 1875 by William Henry Lynn and further alterations made by Lynn in 1895 removed much of the original classical-style features. Local architects Tulloch & Fitzsimons extended the building again in 1919 and G. P. & R. H. Bell carried out a further extension in 1956-59.

In 1969 the Assembly Rooms was named the "Best Kept Large Building in the city of Belfast". The structure was granted statutory protection as a Grade B1 listed building in 1975. The bank, which had merged with Northern Bank in 1970, vacated the site in 2000.

== Dereliction ==
The Assembly Rooms have been on the Northern Ireland Buildings at Risk register since 2003. Since the bank left the site it has been used only occasionally, for cultural events such as music concerts and art shows. Since 2016 the building has been owned by London-based company Castlebrooke Investments as part of their land holding for the Tribeca Belfast regeneration scheme in the recently branded Cathedral Quarter. The company proposes to demolish the 1875 extension and replace it with a 5-storey modern structure as part of a conversion of the building into a 50-bedroom hotel. Whilst the structure has lain largely disused it has been subject to vandalism. A harp meeting was held at the site in July 2022 to draw attention to its derelict state.

The structure is sometimes considered to be the oldest public building in Belfast, though P. Larmour in his 1987 Belfast, An Illustrated Architectural Guide thought that too little was left of the original structure to qualify.
