= Banknotes of the Bank of Ireland (Northern Ireland) =

Banknotes have been issued by the Bank of Ireland for circulation in Northern Ireland since 1922.

== History ==
Although the Bank of Ireland is not a central bank, it does have Sterling note-issuing rights in the United Kingdom. While Bank of Ireland is headquartered in Dublin, in the Republic of Ireland, it has operations in Northern Ireland, where it retains the legal right (dating from before the partition of Ireland) to print its own banknotes. These are pound sterling notes and equal in value to Bank of England notes, and should not be confused with banknotes of the former Irish pound.

The Bank of Ireland does not issue banknotes in the territory of the Republic of Ireland; until the Republic joined the euro in 1999, the only note-issuing bank there was the Central Bank of Ireland.

== Pre-decimal issues (1922–70) ==
These issues were issued between 1922 and 1970.

(PS catalogue numbers to be inserted)

== Decimal issues (1971–) ==
A £5 Sterling note issued by Bank of Ireland in Northern Ireland

These issues have been issued since the United Kingdom of Great Britain and Northern Ireland changed over to decimal currency on 15 February 1971.

The obverse side of Bank of Ireland banknotes features the Bank of Ireland logo, below which is a line of heraldic shields each representing one of the six counties of Northern Ireland. Below this is a depiction of a seated Hibernia figure, surrounded by the Latin motto of the Bank, Bona Fides Reipublicae Stabilitas ("Good Faith is the Cornerstone of the State").

A new series of Bank of Ireland notes, in denominations of £5, £10 and £20, were issued in April 2008. All of the denominations feature an illustration of the Old Bushmills Distillery on the reverse side. Prior to 2008, all Bank of Ireland notes featured an image of the Queen's University of Belfast on the reverse side.

The current series of Bank of Ireland banknotes, in denominations of £5, £10, £20 and £50, were issued in 2013. All of the denominations feature an image of Hibernia, a line of shields representing the six counties of Northern Ireland and its logo on the front. The back designs feature an image of the Old Bushmills Distillery, the same image first used for the 2008 series.

In February 2019, the Bank of Ireland introduced a new series of notes printed on polymer substrate. The themes presented on both sides are the same as their paper counterparts, but its banknote size is that of the Bank of England's notes.

The principal difference between the denominations is their colour and size.

- 5 pound note, blue
- 10 pound note, pink
- 20 pound note, green
- 50 pound note, blue-green
- 100 pound note, red

== See also ==
- Banknotes of Northern Ireland
- Banknotes of the pound sterling
