= Walter Edmenson =

Captain Sir Walter Alexander Edmenson, CBE, DL (2 December 1892 – 6 October 1992) was a British businessman, shipowner and public administrator.

== Biography ==
Born in Limehouse, London, Edmenson was the second son of Robert Robson Edmenson, Collector of Customs in North Shields; and Annie Fry. His elder brother, Robert Robson, was also an officer in Customs, but for South Shields. He began his career with Wallsend Slipway and Engineering Co., but c. 1914 started working for the shipbuilders Harland and Wolff of Belfast, Northern Ireland. His career was interrupted by the First World War; he served in the Royal Field Artillery, eventually rising to the rank of Captain; he was mentioned in dispatches and earned the War and Victory medals. With the war over, he returned to Harland and Woolf to work in the finances department, supervised by Lord Pirrie. He eventually became secretary of the company's Govan branch, before returning once more to Belfast as the company's head buyer.

He resigned to become managing director of the Ulster Steamship Company, of which he was later President. He eventually became President of G. Heyn & Sons Ltd and director of a number of firms, including the Clyde Shipping Company (1946–64), the Belfast Banking Company (1946–70), the North Continental Shipping Company (1946–70) and the British European Airways Corporation. During the Second World War, he was shipping representative at the Ministry of War Transport in Northern Ireland, and was appointed a Commander of the Order of the British Empire (CBE) in 1944 in recognition of his services. After the war, he continued in a number of public roles, notably as Chairman of the Northern Ireland Civil Aviation Advisory Council (1946–61) and a member of the Ulster Transport Authority (1948–64) and the Council of the Chamber of Shipping (1943–73). He was a Deputy Lieutenant of Belfast from 1951 to 1987, was knighted in 1958 and received the American Medal of Freedom in 1945. He married, in 1918, Doris Davidson; before she died in 1975, they had one son, Walter Alexander Jr., who was killed in action in 1940 while commissioned in the Royal Navy as a Sub-Lieutenant.

Sir Walter died on 6 October 1992, two months shy of his 100th birthday.
