= Northern Bank Headquarters =

Office of Danske Bank in Northern Ireland

Coordinates: 54.596°N 5.932°W

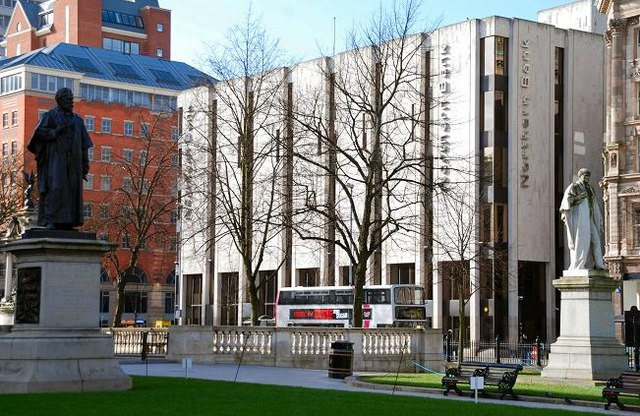
Northern Bank headquarters

The Northern Bank Headquarters in Belfast is the head office of Danske Bank in Northern Ireland after being acquired by Danske Bank in 2005. It is located in Donegall Square West and was the location of the infamous Northern Bank robbery which is among the largest bank robberies in United Kingdom history.

== Robbery ==
On 19 December 2004, men posing as PSNI officers arrived at the homes of two Northern Bank staff members and threatened to kill their families if they did not go to work normally the following day and follow their instructions. The two men listened to the robbers the next day and they were able to escape with cash amounting to £26.5 million. The bank was able to distribute new notes and recalled the old one rendering a portion of the stolen money useless. Many people suspected IRA of being involved in the robbery and the peace talks that led up to Good Friday Agreement almost broke down as a result.
