= Banknotes of Ireland =

A 5 Pound note issued by the private banking firm of Gibbons & Williams in Dublin, Ireland (1833).

Ireland has a history of trading its own banknotes for several centuries, both when the whole of Ireland was one legal entity, and following partition of the island into the Republic of Ireland and Northern Ireland. Notes have been issued by individual banks and by state agencies of the Republic of Ireland and the United Kingdom. Currently, various commercial banks in Northern Ireland locally issue notes (or Bank of England notes) of the Pound sterling, while the Central Bank of Ireland, in the Republic of Ireland, issues local euro banknotes.

== First Irish pound ==
British rule
Commercial bank issues 1783–1921
↓
Irish Free State & Northern Ireland
Commercial bank issues 1921–27
↙
↓

Northern Ireland issues
(part of the U.K.)
Commercial bank issues 1929+
Irish government banknote issues
Currency Commission 1927–42
↓
↘
Legal Tender Notes
A Series 1928–42
Consolidated Banknotes
commercial bank issues
1929–41
↓
↙
Central Bank of Ireland 1943–2001

Legal Tender Notes
A Series 1943–77
B Series 1976–93
C Series 1992–2001

Source: Devitt, M Mac (18 November 2000). "Introduction to Irish Paper Money Issues ca1670-2001. The Structure of Banknote Issues in Ireland". irishpapermoney.com.

Currency notes first appeared in Ireland the late 1600s when merchants began to issue paper notes for purchases which they promised to redeem at a later stage. These notes began to change hands prior to redemption, becoming the first paper to circulate as currency notes in Ireland. Some of these merchants went on to become bankers and issued paper currency in the form of banknotes and post bills as a service. These became the Irish private banks which issued the banknotes in use throughout Ireland for over 100 years. The most famous of these is the House of La Touche.

Irish private banks issued a wide variety of denominations in guineas, pence, shillings, and pounds. Their notes tended to correspond to coin denominations, and are known to range up to £100. Many banks issued only small notes, those with a face value below £5.

Private banks were small partnerships, and were limited to six partners or less by an act of Parliament of 1756. Some of the private banks were very successful and their banknotes were reliable instruments. However, because of their nature as small organisations, many of the private banks failed, with their banknotes becoming worth a fraction of their face value. The weakness of the paper currency in Ireland lead to pressure for the creation of a ‘National Bank’ to provide a stable currency. Eventually, the Bank of Ireland was created to fill this need.

The Bank of Ireland was the first joint stock bank to produce notes intended for use throughout Ireland; its first issue was in 1783. Early notes were denominated either in Irish pounds or guineas, with 1 guinea equal to 1 pound 2 shillings 9 pence Irish.

The suspension of cash payments by the Bank Restriction Act 1797 lead to an increase in the usage of banknotes in Ireland, and the notes of many of the private banks became payable in Bank of Ireland notes, which was stated on each banknote often worded as 'National Bank Paper'. The Bank of Ireland also began to issue small notes pound and guinea denominations in place of gold.

The highest denomination banknote that has been recorded for an Irish bank is a £500 note issued by the Bank of Ireland dated in 1869.

== Pound sterling ==
In 1826, the Irish pound was replaced by the pound sterling and later Irish banknotes were issued denominated in sterling. Banks issuing notes during this period were the Bank of Ireland, the Belfast Banking Company, the National Bank, the Northern Banking Company, the Provincial Bank of Ireland and the Ulster Bank.

From 1824 banking regulation in Ireland was changed to allow for the formation of joint stock banks with branch networks. This resulted in the foundation of several large joint stock banks which started to issue banknotes in Ireland. The notes of these banks quickly replaced those of the Irish private banks in circulation.

By 1836, six banks were issuing notes in Ireland. The following denominations are known for each bank up to 1844: Agricultural and Commercial Bank of Ireland (Founded 1834): £1, 35 Shillings, £3, £5, £10. Bank of Ireland (Founded 1783): 30 Shillings, £1, £3, £5, £10, £20, £50, £100, £200, £500. Others likely Belfast Banking Company (Founded 1827): 25 Shillings. Others likely. National Bank of Ireland (Founded 1835): 30 Shillings, £1, £3, £5, £10, £20, £50, £100. Northern Banking Company (Founded 1824): £1, 25 Shillings, 30 Shillings. Others likely. Provincial Bank of Ireland (Founded 1825): £1, 25 Shillings, 30 Shillings, £2, £3, £4, £5, £10, £20, £50, £100. Ulster Banking Company (Founded 1836): £1, 25 Shillings, 30 Shillings, 35 Shillings, £3, £5, £10, £20, £50, £100.

In addition, the Bank of Ireland issued notes denominated in One Guinea and One Guinea and a Half up until around 1819, as evidenced by images of surviving examples, the latest known of which is dated 4 Jan 1819. An early proof One Guinea note is known for Northern Banking Company, ca1824.

The Agricultural and Commercial Bank of Ireland failed in 1840. After 1845 fractional denominations were prohibited, and the denominations issued by the banks settled on the following up to 1920: Bank of Ireland: £1, £3, £5, £10, £20, £50, £100, £500. Belfast Banking Company: : £1, £5, £10, £20, £50, £100. National Bank of Ireland: £1, £3, £5, £10, £20, £50, £100. Northern Banking Company: £1, £5, £10, £20, £50, £100. Provincial Bank of Ireland: £1, £3, £5, £10, £20, £50, £100. Ulster Banking Company: £1, £5, £10, £20, £50, £100.

== Irish Free State and Republic of Ireland ==
Initially the partition of Ireland did not have any direct impact on currency; however, the Currency Act of 1927 gave the Currency Commission the sole authority to print and circulate legal tender in the Irish Free State. This resulted in notes issued directly by the Commission and also by the eight shareholding banks. From 1943 to 2001, the Central Bank of Ireland took over this role, until the introduction of the euro.

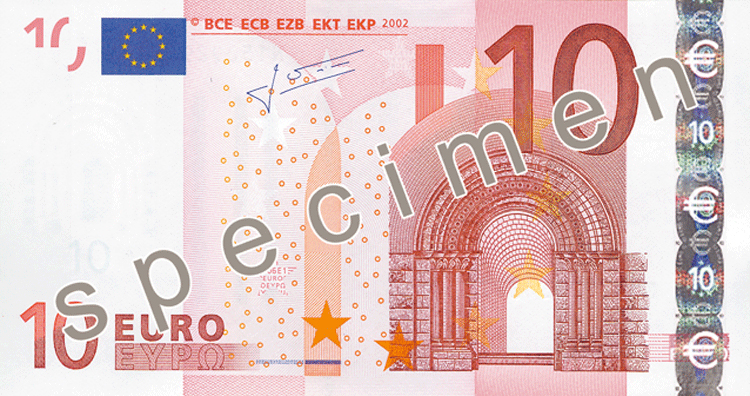
A €10 note (2002 onwards)

Currently euro banknotes circulate in the Republic as legal tender.

== Northern Ireland ==
A Danske Bank £10 note issued in 2013

An Ulster Bank £20 sterling note

In 1929, six banks began issuing sterling notes for circulation in Northern Ireland. These were Bank of Ireland, Belfast Banking Company, National Bank, Northern Bank, Provincial Bank of Ireland and Ulster Bank.

Today, four banks retain the right to issue banknotes in Northern Ireland, based at Belfast, two of which are Irish owned, one Scottish owned and one Danish owned. These banks are Bank of Ireland (NI), Northern Bank trading as Danske Bank, First Trust Bank, and Ulster Bank. Their notes are backed by deposits at the Bank of England.

First Trust or AIB as they are now known will cease their banknote issue in 2022.

== See also ==
- Irish pound
- Pound sterling
