= Northern Bank £5 note =

Five pounds
(United Kingdom)
- Value: £5 sterling
- Security features: Raised print, watermark see-through window, microprinting, UV feature
- Material used: Polymer
- Years of printing: 1999 (last design)

Reverse
- Design: Space Shuttle
- Design date: 1999

The Northern Bank £5 note was a banknote issued by Northern Bank for circulation in Northern Ireland, United Kingdom. It was the smallest denomination note issued by the bank. Following the takeover of Northern Bank by Danske Bank in 2004, production of the note ended and it was slowly removed from circulation.

== History ==
In October 1999 a special polymer version featuring an illustration of the Space Shuttle was issued in celebration of the millennium. It was the first polymer banknote used in the United Kingdom. After the Northern Bank robbery in which £26.5 million was stolen, Northern Bank reprinted all of its banknotes with different designs apart from the £5 note which was not replaced.

== Design ==
=== List of historical designs ===
Note	First issued	Colour	Size	Design	Additional information
series 1927–1968	1927				
series 1970–1986	1995	Green	156 × 85 mm	Front: Walter Scott; Back: Arts and culture	
series 1988–1990	1988	Green	136 × 70 mm	William Atcheson Traill	
Millennium	21 December 1999	Green	135 × 70 mm	Space Shuttle	
