= Samuel Cleland Davidson =

British inventor and engineer (1846-1921)

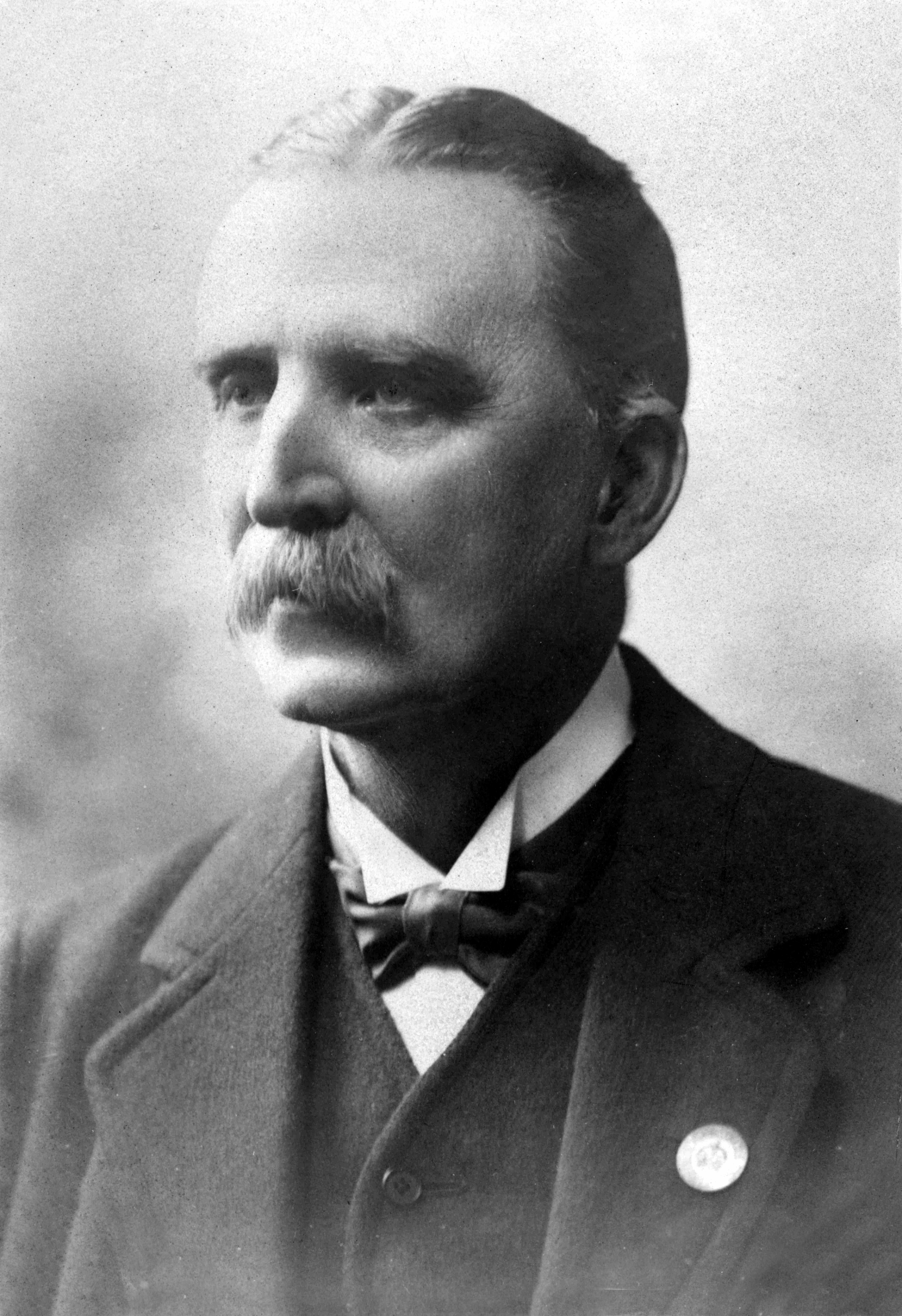
- Born: 18 November 1846; County Down, Ireland
- Died: 18 August 1921 (aged 74); County Down, Northern Ireland
- Citizenship: United Kingdom
- Education: Royal Belfast Academical Institution
- Occupations: Engineer and inventor
- Known for: Inventor of air conditioning and founder of the Sirocco Engineering Works in Belfast

Sir Samuel Cleland Davidson, KBE (18 November 1846 – 18 August 1921) was a British inventor and engineer. During his career in the tea import business he invented and patented a number of industrial machines and developed the earliest air conditioning systems. He founded the Sirocco Works in Belfast in 1881.

== Early life ==
Davidson was born in County Down on 18 November 1846, the youngest child of a family of Ulster Scots. He was educated at the Royal Belfast Academical Institution (the "Inst") and left at the age of 15 to work at a Belfast civil engineering firm, William Hastings. As a teenager he gained experience as an apprentice to a surveyor in Belfast, and visited his uncle John Davidson's flax mill in Drumaness, probably the first in Ulster to be equipped with power machinery. He also became familiar with John's experimental approach using scientific methods to increase crop yields in flax farming for the linen industry. These early experiences gave Sam a lifelong appreciation for learning through personal hands-on experience, and innovation in commercial agriculture and engineering.

== Career ==
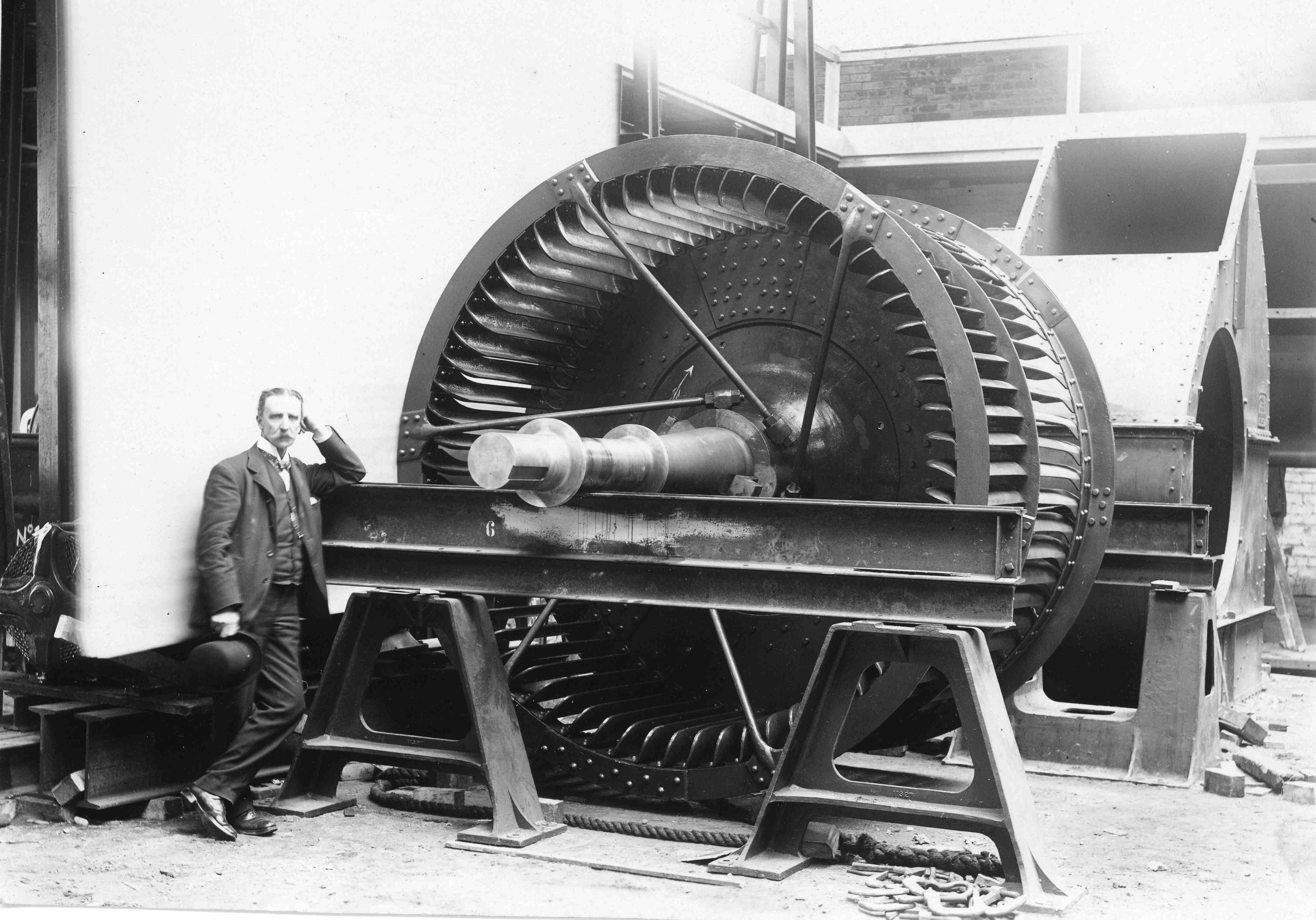
Samuel Cleland Davidson with a huge centrifugal fan he designed and manufactured, probably for ventillating a mine shaft.

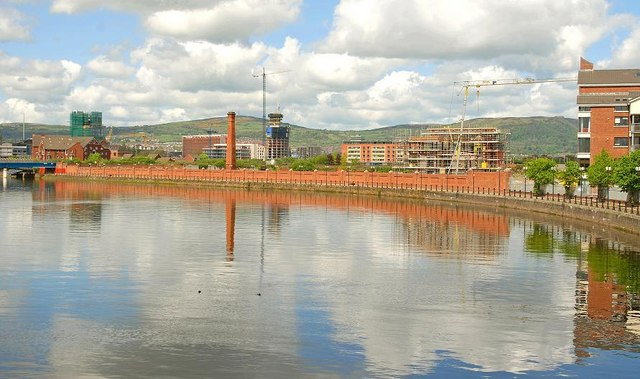
The Sirocco Works on the River Lagan, Belfast, during demolition in 2009

In 1864 Davidson left his job to work for his father, James Davidson who owned a flour mill close to the site of the later Sirocco works. The Indian government had discovered wild tea growing in the Assam region and was determined to initiate a massive tea-growing operation there with the potential to generate huge wealth for the British Empire as it consolidated its hold on the economy of India. The opportunity to have its own tea industry and become less dependent on importing the Empire's favourite drink from China was too important to ignore. Initially the government paid for and organised clearing the forest and the planting and management of tea 'gardens', as the large plantations were called. Once they were established they were sold to private investors to consolidate and expand, and develop a commercially viable industry.

Samuel's father and uncle set up a business importing tea and bought a share in a tea estate in Cachar, 300 miles north-east of Calcutta in India. Samuel's cousin James went to India to personally manage the estate and later invited 17-year-old Samuel and some other local young men to join him.

Samuel Davidson quickly gained a reputation as a hard working, trustworthy and successful estate manager. He applied his agricultural and engineering knowledge to significantly improve crop yields, and to begin mechanising every stage of the archaic and very labour-intensive processes involved in turning plucked tea leaves into a marketable product of consistent quality. As a person who had not pursued higher education at home, Samuel's innovations mainly came about through persistent experimentation, and his greatest successes were sometimes counter-intuitive to the assumptions of engineers at the time. Not knowing that what he was trying to achieve with centrifugal fans was considered impossible by more educated mechanical engineers turned out to be a great blessing. When he later travelled to America to prove to sceptical patent authorities that his design actually worked he said "An ounce of fact is worth a ton of theory." ('The Sirocco Story: Birth and growth of an industry' by Edward Maguire 1958)

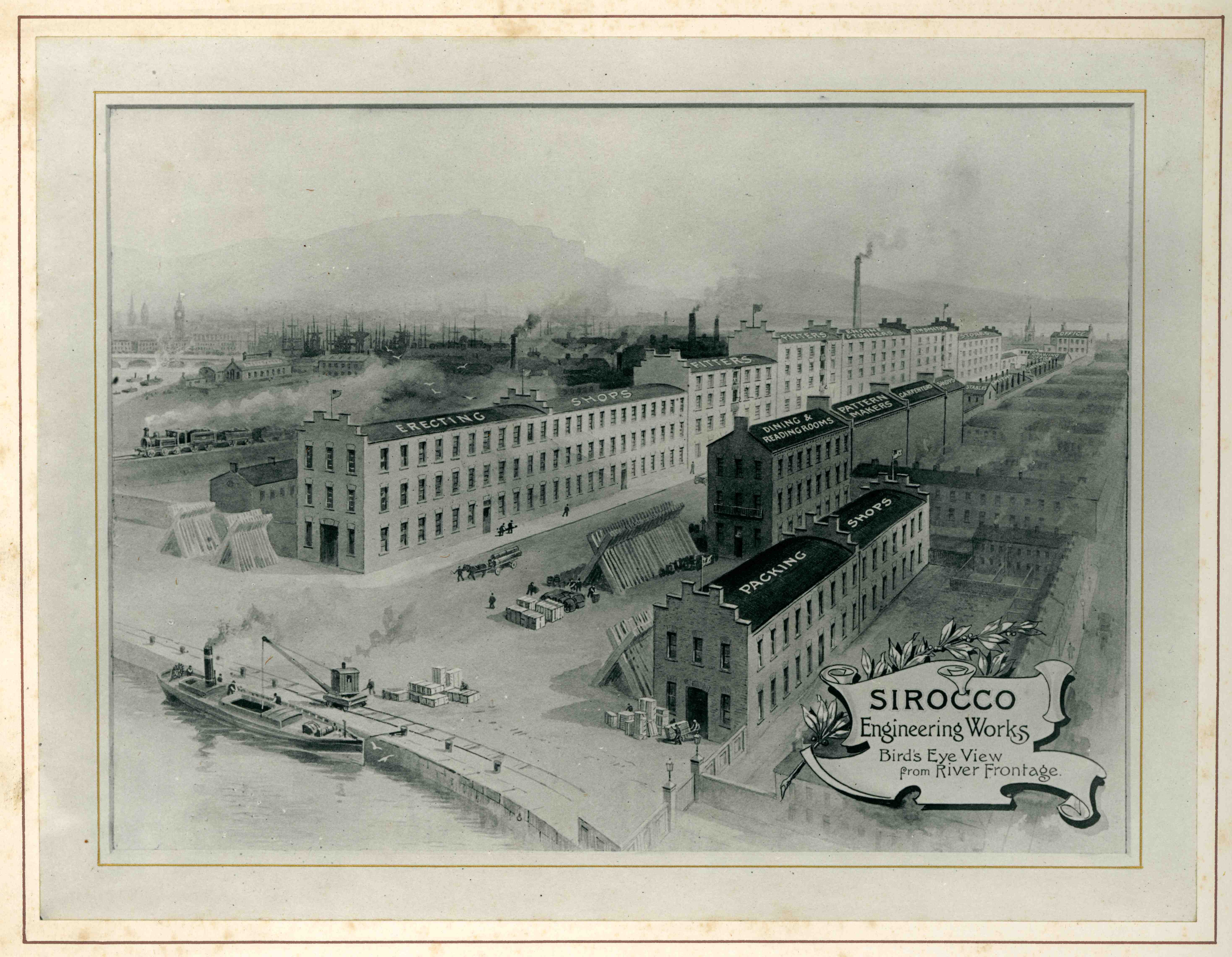
Sirocco Engineering Works, Belfast. Hand painted illustration from an illuminated coming of age book presented to Samuel's son James on his 21st birthday.

He sold the property in India in 1874 and returned to Ireland where he began to manufacture his patented tea machinery with Combe, Barbour and Coombe of Belfast. After a year of manufacturing the first versions of his tea machinery in Belfast, Samuel returned to India in 1878 and toured the major centres of tea production with a portable tea factory which he set up in each remote location to demonstrate to the planters what his products could achieve. The orders started to flood in and his machines became the standard for the whole industry over the following years. His expertise in every aspect of the industry was so respected that tea companies paid him to spend time in each area he took his factory to making assessments of the local estates and recommendations for how they could best raise their productivity. He also paid for the trip by selling hundreds of another invention of his – a simple wheeled hoe which the planters loved. In 1881 he started his own manufacturing operation in Belfast. The success of his innovative use of stoves to move hot air led him to develop a convection heating system for use in human environments, and by the end of the 1880s his Sirocco stoves were in popular use in schools, church halls and workrooms. He developed his invention further with the introduction in 1898 of a forward-bladed centrifugal fan, which was significantly more powerful than conventional fan designs. This innovation, originally designed for drying tea, evolved into the first air conditioning system. The powerful force of moving hot air across a room with one of his centrifugal fans led one of Davidson's planter colleagues to remark that it reminded him of the Sirocco, the hot wind that blows across the North African desert, and Davidson adopted Sirocco as his brand name, applying it to his products and to the firm's Belfast factory, the Sirocco Engineering Works.

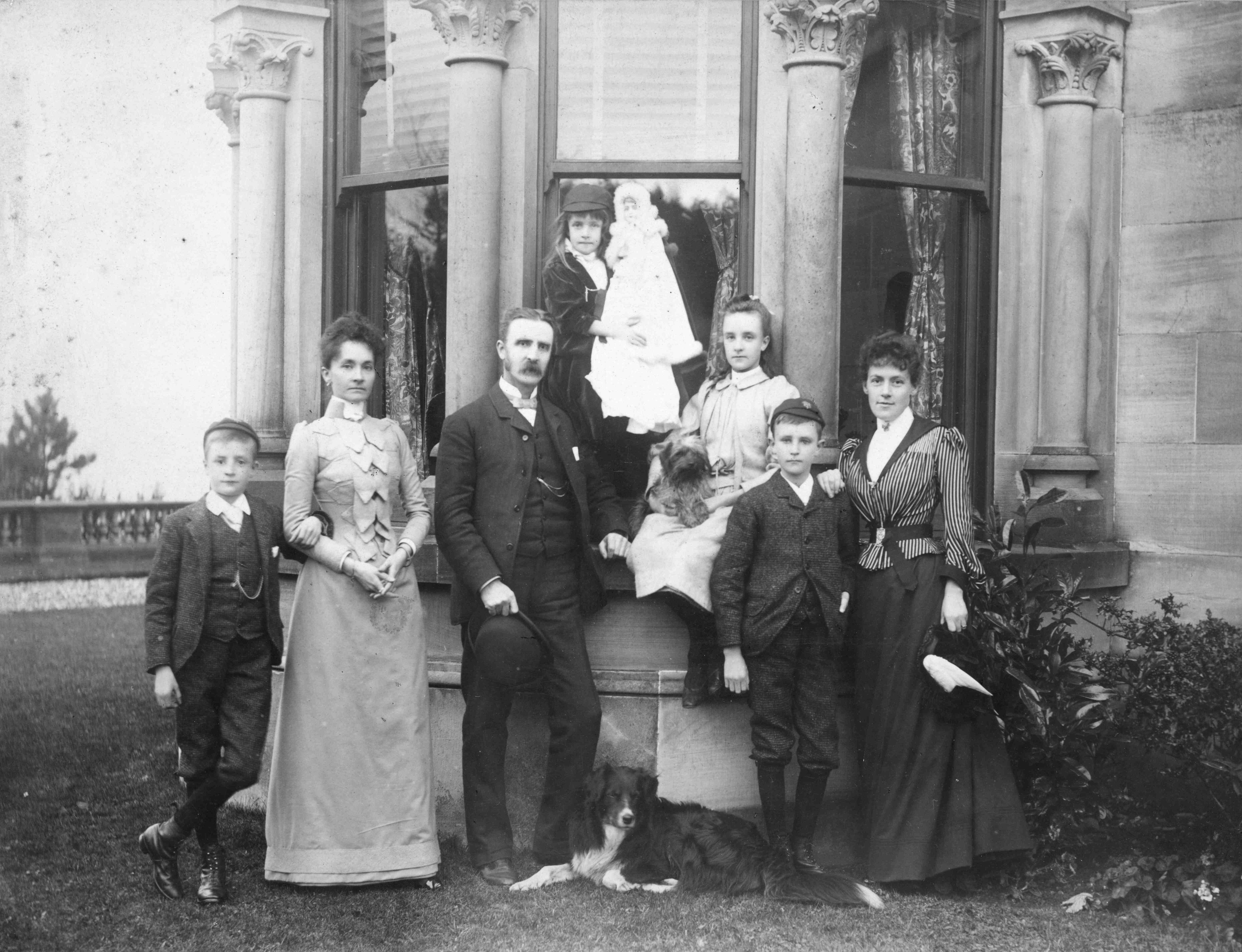
Samuel Cleland Davidson at Killaire House with Richard, Clara (his wife), Kathleen, May, James and cousin Susan on the day he went to visit India 1891.

Davidson & Co grew into one of the largest engineering firms in Ireland, manufacturing and exporting equipment for cooling, drying, dust collecting, heating, ventilating, pneumatic conveyance, and mechanical handling, all invented by Davidson himself. He supplied ventillation fans for the Titanic which was built practically next door to the Sirocco works at the Harland and Wolff shipyard, and have been photographed on the wreck.

During World War I the Sirocco works supplied the Royal Navy and Merchant Navy. When the German fleet was scuttled at Scapa Flow in 1919, it was discovered that nearly every German ship was equipped with Sirocco fans manufactured before the war. Desperate to use his inventing skills to aid the war effort in World War 1, he designed and made prototypes of a hand-held grenade-launching pistol or 'Hand Howitzer' for use in the trenches where his son Jim was fighting as a machine gun captain. The American military were close to placing a big order for these when the war ended.

Samuel was always aware of the diverse applications of the technology he invented and newspapers of the late 1800s and early 1900s featured adverts for Sirocco products ranging from lawn tennis net poles to ventillation machinery for mining operations. He invented and marketed a sparkling tea drink, and was close friends with John Dunlop as they were both experimenting with the vulcanisation of rubber, another imperial cash crop with huge potential for the British economy.

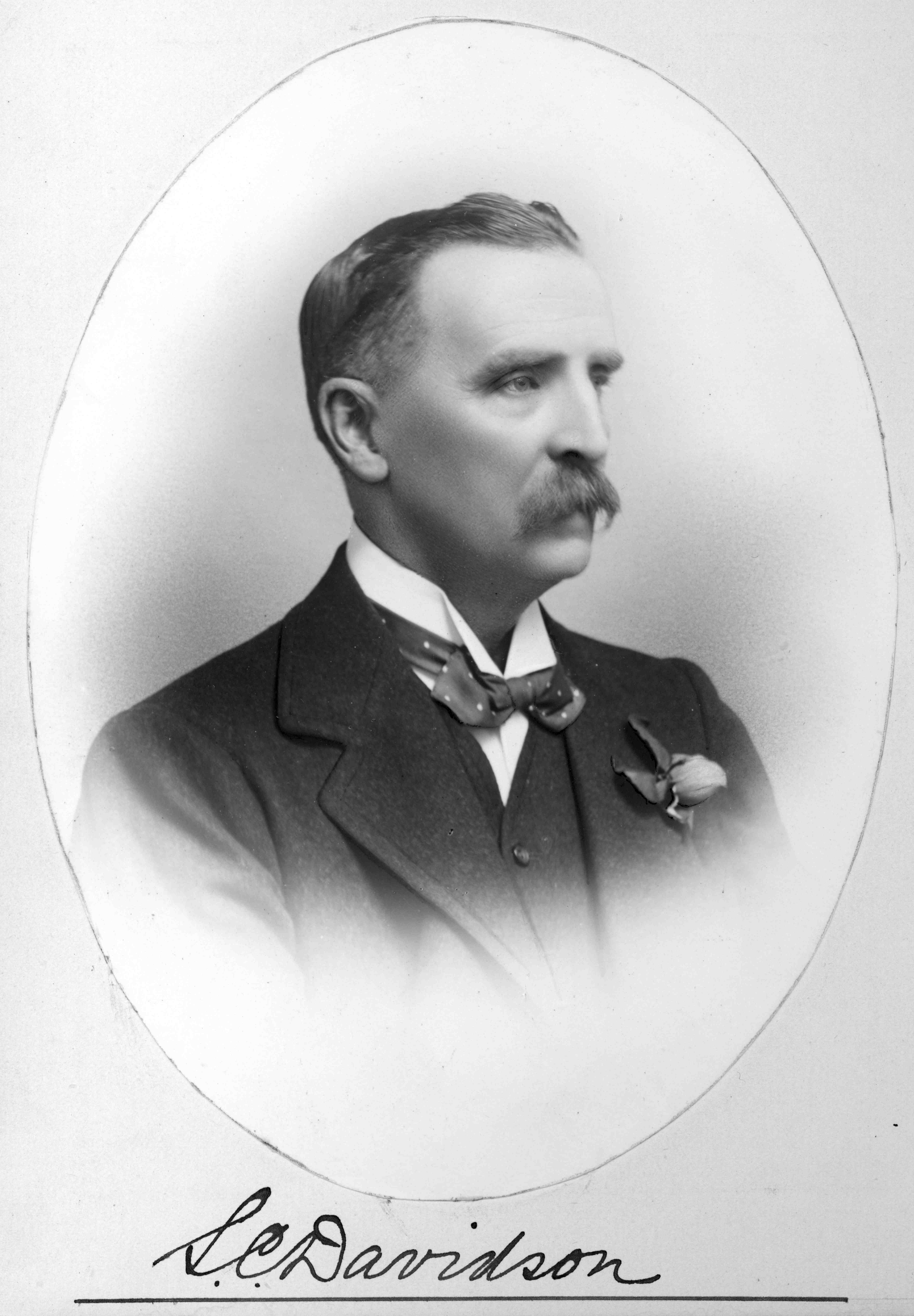

Samuel was a very effective strategist – he could think ahead, see the big picture and take bold steps to change the circumstances for his businesses if necessary. An example of this was the retail price of tea. It was still very expensive in the late Victorian era and he realised that if the Indian tea estates and his machinery were to make a profit in the long term the retail price would have to come down significantly and become affordable for the whole population. To fix this he set up the Sirocco Bonded Tea Store, imported and sold tea at a far lower price than usual that forced the larger tea companies to cut their prices too, then closed that company once it had achieved its goal. He brought the retail price of tea in Belfast down from 5 shillings to 2 shillings per pound.

Throughout the political tensions and upheavals in Northern Ireland Samuel was a keen Unionist who believed strongly that Irish businesses like his were safer in the British Empire than out of it, and he was a staunch supporter of Edward Carson and the original Ulster Volunteer Force opposing home rule for Ireland. However, he never indulged in sectarian bigotry and employed Protestants and Catholics alike at the Sirocco Works. When anti-Catholic gangsters demanded that he sack his Catholic employees Samuel refused and posted armed guards at the works to protect them until the threats subsided.

When his son and heir James, who had been groomed to inherit the company, was killed at the Somme Samuel's health began to decline and his son in law Frederick Maguire who was already a senior manager led the company through the next generation.

In 1988, the Davidson Group was acquired by the fan and heat exchanger firm James Howden & Co (established 1854 by the Scottish engineer James Howden) to form Howden Sirocco Limited, today known as Howden UK. Davidson's Sirocco Works were eventually vacated and in 2009 the property was demolished as part of the redevelopment of the Belfast Waterfront. The name of Davidson's former factory continues today in the Sirocco Works Football Club, a team formed in 1924 by works employees which continues to play today in the Northern Amateur Football League.

== Family ==
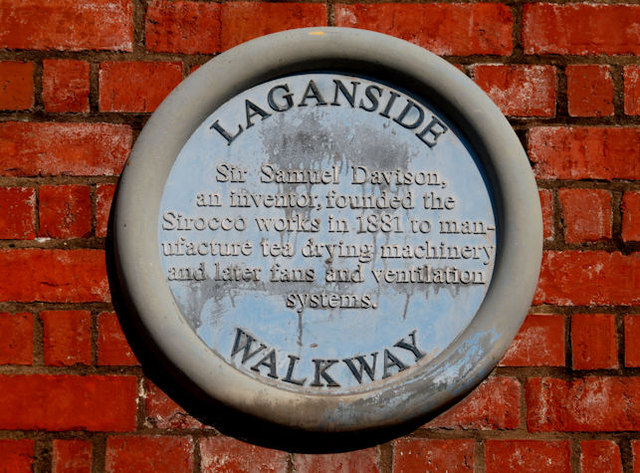
A plaque on the Laganside Walkway next to the former Sirocco works, commemorating Sir Samuel Davison

Samuel Cleland Davidson married Clara Mary Coleman in 1873 and they had five children, Annie Davidson 1873–1874 who was born and died in India, Clara May Davidson 1875–1950, James Samuel Davidson 1877–1916, Richard 'Dick' Frederick Davidson 1878–1897 (died of Meningitis aged 18) and Kathleen Davidson 1882–1970. Clara married one of her father's employees, Frederick George Maguire, in 1903. James worked as general manager in his father's business and patented several of his own mechanical engineering developments. He toured the world in 1911 making business deals in Russia, Japan and America, and was expected to eventually take over from his father. He served as a volunteer with the 1st Battalion North Down Regiment of the Ulster Volunteer Force and during World War I he became a captain in the 13th Royal Irish Rifles. James was shot dead by a German sniper on 1 July 1916, the first day of the Battle of the Somme, aged 39, while being carried back to the British trenches after fighting hard all day and being shot in the knee.

== Later life and death ==
Samuel Cleland Davidson became a Member of the Institution of Mechanical Engineers in 1888, and in 1921 he was knighted by King George V although too ill to make the journey to London for the ceremonials. A few months later Davidson died on 18 August 1921 in Seacourt, Bangor, County Down. He was buried alongside his wife, Clara Mary, in Belfast City Cemetery.

Davidson's contribution to engineering in Ireland was commemorated by the Northern Bank in its Inventor series of banknotes celebrating Northern Irish inventors. Sir Samuel featured with tea plants and some of his machinery on the bank's £50 note. Three design versions of this series were issued over the years, the second being hastily replaced by the third after a major bank robbery by the IRA. The note was discontinued in 2013 when the bank reissued its banknotes under the new Danske Bank brand.
