= Ulster Bank £50 note =

Fifty pounds
- Country: Northern Ireland
- Value: £50 sterling
- Width: 156 mm
- Height: 85 mm
- Security features: watermark, security thread, microprinting, fluorescent ink, raised print, security hologram
- Material used: paper
- Years of printing: 1997–2022 (paper)

Obverse
- Design: Ulster landscape, Belfast Harbour, Giant's Causeway, flax plants, Celtic knot

Reverse
- Design: Ulster Bank coat of arms, arms of the provinces of Ireland

The Ulster Bank £50 note is a banknote issued by Ulster Bank. It is valued at fifty pounds sterling and the current design was first issued in 1997. As with most banknotes of Northern Ireland, they can be used for transactions in the Isle of Man and Great Britain, but in practice most retailers will not accept them and they are not legal tender.

== Design ==
Released in 2022, the polymer (plastic) £50 banknote celebrates Northern Irish industry with such features as a Pine marten, gorse flowers, a loom worker, and scientist.

The paper £50 note was olive and green in colour. The obverse side featured the Ulster landscape, with Belfast Harbour, the Giant's Causeway, flax plants and Celtic knot patterns. The reverse showed the Ulster Bank coat of arms, and the arms of the provinces of Ireland.
