= Northern Bank robbery =

Large bank robbery in Belfast, Northern Ireland

Coordinates: 54°35′47″N 5°55′56″W

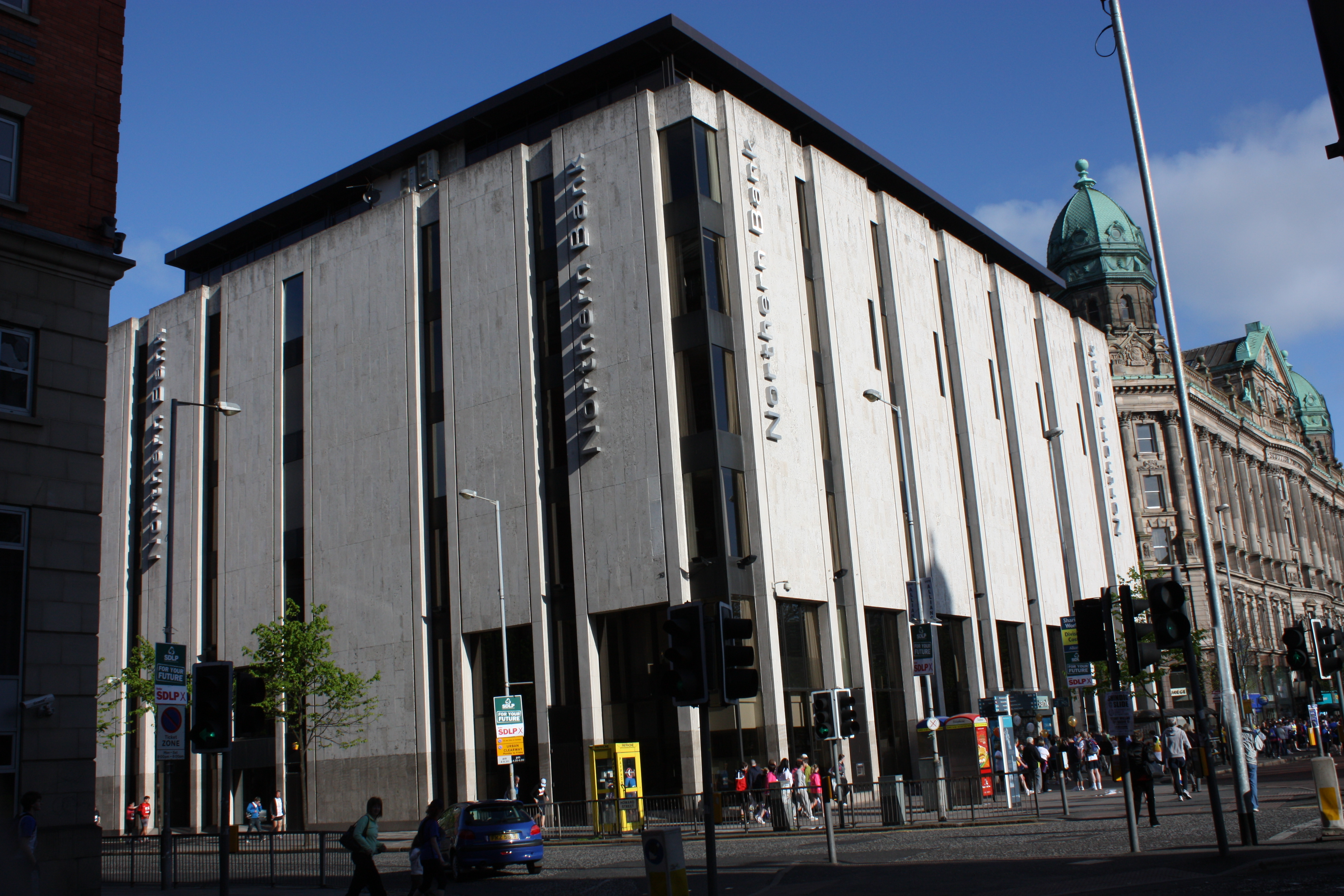
Northern Bank headquarters at Donegall Square, Belfast

On 20 December 2004, £26.5 million (Note: Equivalent to £47.8 million in 2025) in cash was stolen from the headquarters of Northern Bank on Donegall Square West in Belfast, Northern Ireland. Having taken family members of two bank officials hostage, an armed gang forced the workers to help them steal both used and unused pound sterling banknotes. The money was then loaded into a van and driven away in two trips. This was one of the largest bank robberies in the history of the United Kingdom.

The Police Service of Northern Ireland (PSNI), the Independent Monitoring Commission (IMC), the British government and the Taoiseach all claimed the Provisional Irish Republican Army (IRA) was responsible. This was denied by the IRA and by Sinn Féin. Throughout 2005, the police forces in Northern Ireland and the Republic of Ireland made arrests and carried out house searches. A sum of £2.3 million (Note: Equivalent to £4.2 million in 2025) was impounded at the house of a financial adviser, Ted Cunningham, in County Cork and Phil Flynn was forced to resign as chairman of the Bank of Scotland (Ireland), because he was a director of one of Cunningham's companies. Cunningham was convicted in 2009 of money laundering, had his conviction quashed in 2012 and was convicted at retrial in 2014. Chris Ward, one of the bank officials threatened by the gang, was arrested in November 2005 and charged with robbery. The prosecution offered no evidence at trial and he was released.

Northern Bank announced soon after the heist that it would replace its own bank notes, in denominations of £5, £10, £20, £50 and £100. Alongside the murder of Robert McCartney in 2005, the robbery adversely affected the Northern Ireland peace process. It damaged the relationship between the Taoiseach Bertie Ahern and the Sinn Féin representatives Gerry Adams and Martin McGuinness. Although Cunningham and several others were eventually convicted of crimes uncovered during the investigation, nobody has ever been held directly responsible for the robbery.

== Robbery ==
In the early 2000s, Northern Bank (now Danske Bank) was the largest retail bank in Northern Ireland, with 95 branches. It was then owned by National Australia Bank and its headquarters were at Donegall Square West in Belfast. It was one of four banks in Northern Ireland permitted to print its own bank notes, in denominations of £5, £10, £20, £50 and £100.

On the night of Sunday 19 December 2004, groups of armed men arrived at the homes of two employees of Northern Bank, one in Downpatrick, County Down, the other in Poleglass, west Belfast. Chris Ward was taken from his house in County Down and driven to Poleglass, where Kevin McMullan (his supervisor at the bank) had been tied up by men disguised as officers from the Police Service of Northern Ireland (PSNI). Gunmen remained at Ward's home, keeping his family hostage. McMullan's wife was taken from her home and held at an unknown location. The criminals left at 06:00 on Monday morning, 20 December, having instructed the two workers to report for work as normal at the bank's headquarters.

The gang constantly kept in touch with McMullan and Ward using mobile telephones it had given them. The two men were ordered to tell staff to go home early and to fill a bag with £1 million in £50 and £100 notes. Ward was then instructed to leave the bank carrying the bag and go to a bus stop in nearby Upper Queen Street, where one of the robbers picked it up. This was later regarded as being a test run for the main theft in the evening. McMullan and Ward remained at work after the close of business and were instructed to load crates of banknotes onto trolleys. Having told the security staff they would be wheeling out rubbish for collection, they made four trips to move the trolleys from the basement to the bullion bay, where money was normally picked up and dropped off. They covered the crates with office furniture and empty cardboard boxes to disguise them. After Ward called the gang, a white van came to the headquarters and was permitted by security to enter the bay, where it took the two bank employees 15 minutes to load everything in.

The criminals said they would come back to pick up more trolleys, ordering Ward and McMullan to fill up as many as possible. By the time the van returned, the workers had only filled two more, which were again wheeled up from basement to the van. They then locked up the bank, setting alarms and leaving as usual; they drove to Ward's house, where the masked men were still guarding his family. At around 21:00, the criminals left, carefully erasing any forensic trace of their presence by scrubbing surfaces down and taking away cups they had used. After twenty minutes, McMullan left and drove back to his house. Around this time, McMullan's wife was driven to Drumkeeragh Forest near Ballynahinch and released. She found her way to a house to raise the alarm and was treated for hypothermia. At 23:00, following his final instructions, Ward called the police to inform them the robbery had taken place.

The criminals took £26.5 million: £16.5 million in uncirculated Northern Bank pound sterling banknotes; £5.5 million in used Northern Bank sterling notes; £4.5 million in used notes supplied by other banks and smaller cash amounts in other currencies including euros and US dollars. The new and uncirculated notes (£9 million in £20 notes and £7.5 million in £10 notes) would be hard to launder since the bank immediately announced the serial numbers, but the used notes were untraceable. The police quickly set up an investigation composed of 50 detectives. Assistant Chief Constable Sam Kincaid commented "this was not a lucky crime, this was a well-organised crime".

== Initial responses ==
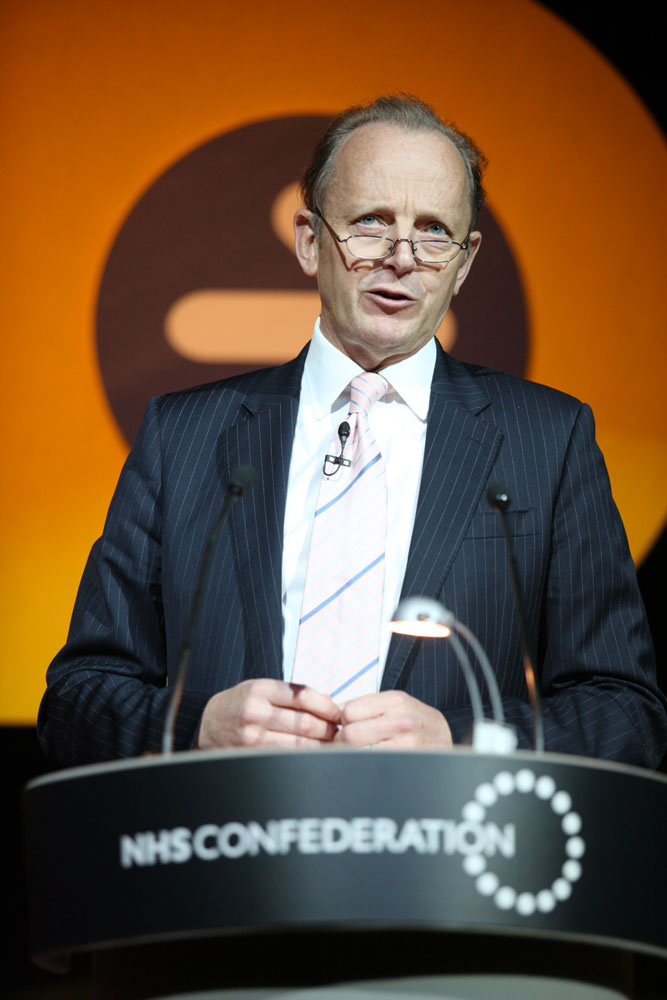
Hugh Orde, Chief Constable of the Police Service of Northern Ireland, accused the Provisional Irish Republican Army (IRA) of organising the robbery.

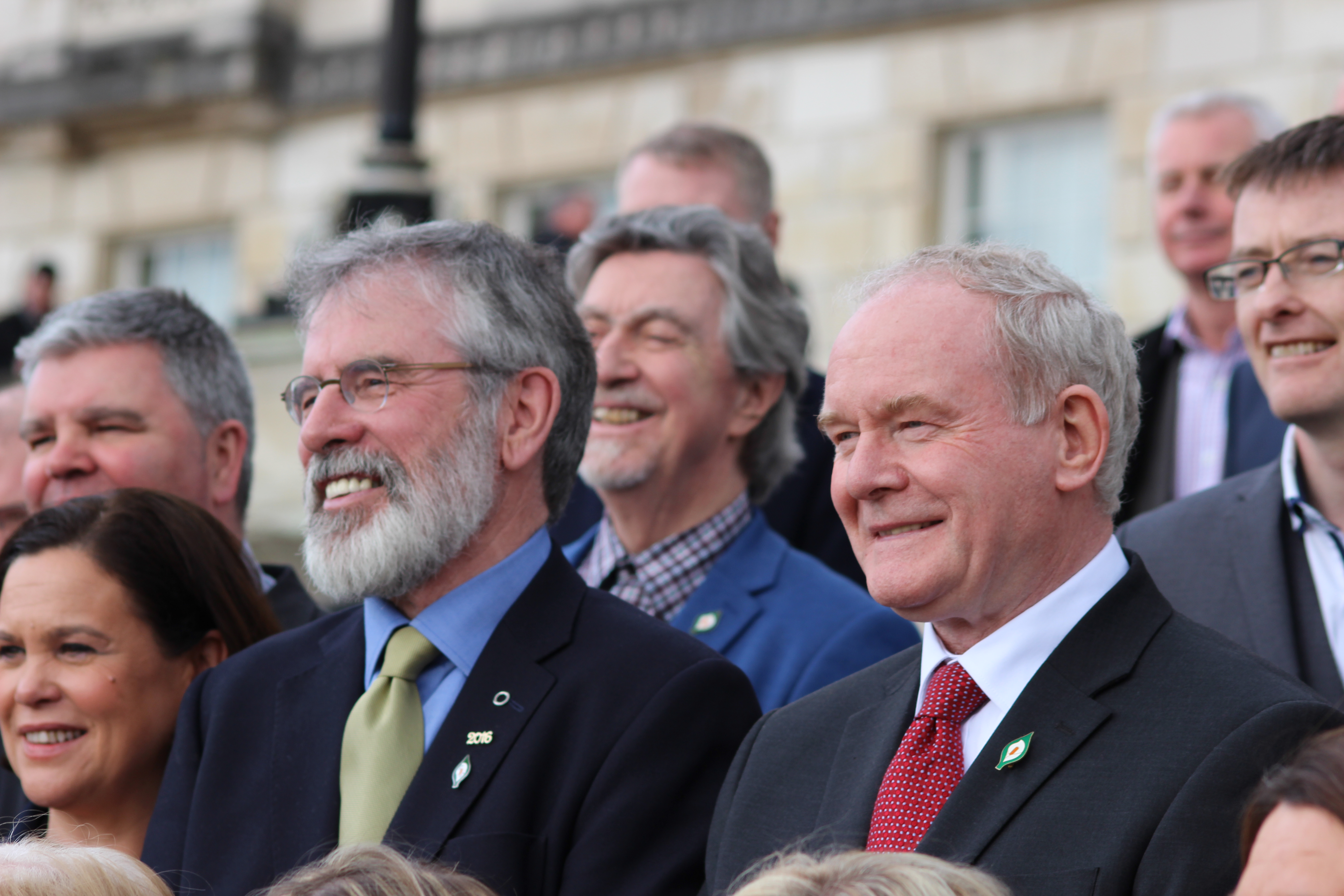
Sinn Féin lead negotiator Martin McGuinness (seen here on right with Gerry Adams on left) denied that the IRA were behind the heist.

Although the Police Service of Northern Ireland (PSNI) initially refused to be drawn as to who might be involved, several commentators, including journalist Kevin Myers writing in The Daily Telegraph, quickly blamed the Provisional Irish Republican Army (IRA). One senior police officer quoted in The Guardian newspaper said: "This operation required great expertise and coordination, probably more than the loyalist gangs possess".

On 7 January 2005, the Chief Constable of the PSNI Hugh Orde issued an interim report in which he blamed the Provisional IRA for the robbery. The British government concurred with Orde's assessment, as did the Independent Monitoring Commission (IMC – the body appointed by the Irish and British governments to oversee the Northern Ireland ceasefires). However, Sinn Féin denied the Chief Constable's claim, saying the IRA had not conducted the raid and that their officials had not known of or sanctioned the robbery. Martin McGuinness (a leading Sinn Féin negotiator) said that Orde's accusation represented "nothing more than politically-biased allegations. This is more to do with halting the process of change which Sinn Féin has been driving forward than with anything that happened at the Northern Bank". The Irish Taoiseach Bertie Ahern said that "an operation of this magnitude...has obviously been planned at a stage when I was in negotiations with those that would know the leadership of the Provisional movement". The IMC recommended that Sinn Féin be fined for authorising the heist and remarked in the report that "the leadership and rank and file of Sinn Féin need to make the choice between continued association with and support for PIRA criminality and the path of an exclusively democratic political party".

The Provisional IRA issued a statement on 18 January 2005, saying "the IRA has been accused of involvement in the recent Northern Bank robbery. We were not involved". Despite this denial, it was widely believed by Northern Irish politicians that the Provisional IRA was responsible. Commentators in the UK mainstream media speculated that the heist had been intended either to secure a pension fund for IRA active service members or to support Sinn Féin's electoral campaign. In February 2005, the Irish Minister for Justice Michael McDowell accused Gerry Adams (Sinn Féin MP for Belfast West), McGuinness and Martin Ferris (Sinn Féin TD for Kerry North), of not only being IRA members but leading it from their positions on the IRA Army Council.

== Investigations and arrests ==
On 10 February 2005 (the day that the IMC report was released), houses near Beragh, County Tyrone, belonging to two brothers were searched in connection with the robbery but nothing was found. In the Republic of Ireland, the Garda Síochána announced on 17 February that it had arrested seven people and recovered over £2 million, including £60,000 in Northern Bank notes, during raids in the Cork and Dublin areas, as part of investigations into money laundering. Garda Commissioner Noel Conroy did not officially confirm that the raids were related to the Northern Bank robbery, but said the IRA was behind the laundering. The arrests were made under the Offences against the State Act. Those arrested included several men from Derry and a former Sinn Féin candidate for Dáil Éireann (the lower house of the Oireachtas). Three men were arrested at Heuston Station in Dublin and one of them, Don Bullman, was alleged to have been carrying €94,000 (£62,000) in a box of Daz washing powder. Bullman received a four-year jail sentence in 2007 for membership of the IRA. The sentencing judge said his conviction gave no indication as to his guilt regarding other matters.

The financial adviser Ted Cunningham and his wife were arrested at their house in Farran, County Cork, after £2.3 million was discovered hidden in compost. Phil Flynn, who was chairman of the Bank of Scotland (Ireland), a former Sinn Féin vice-president and an advisor to the Taoiseach, told the police that he was a non-executive director of Chesterton Finance, a company owned by Cunningham. In consequence, his home and offices were raided and he resigned his positions pending the results of the enquiries. The head of the Northern Ireland Policing Board also resigned because he was a non-executive director of a company linked to Flynn. The next day (18 February), Gardaí in Passage West, Cork, arrested a man who had been reported to be burning sterling banknotes in his back garden; he was released without charge then eventually convicted in 2009 regarding 200 rounds of ammunition for a Kalashnikov rifle which were found in his loft when the house was raided. Another Cork man handed in £175,000 and soon afterwards three businessmen handed in £225,000; all four people claimed Cunningham had asked them to look after the money. Cunningham was connected to business interests in Bulgaria and analysts suggested that he was helping the IRA to launder money there by investing in property.

In a separate incident on Saturday 19 February 2005, the PSNI confirmed that it had recovered £50,000 in unused Northern Bank notes from the toilets at the Newforge Country Club, a sports and social club in Belfast for serving and retired police officers. It dismissed it as an attempt to divert attention from the heist. The PSNI later confirmed that the money found at the club had indeed been taken during the robbery.

On 12 October, Garda Commissioner Noel Conroy told a law enforcement conference in Dublin he was satisfied that the money recovered in Cork in February came from the Northern Bank robbery. In November, the PSNI arrested five men: two in Kilcoo, County Down and one each in Belfast, Dungannon and Coalisland. In protest, crowds blocked the road between Castlewellan and Newry near Kilcoo with burnt-out vehicles. Hugh Orde defended the police action as "proportionate"; Sinn Féin MP Michelle Gildernew claimed the raids were "part of a political stunt". A man from Kilcoo was charged with robbery, hostage-taking and possession of a firearm or imitation firearm. The individual arrested in Dungannon was named as Brian Arthurs, a member of Sinn Féin and brother of Declan Arthurs, an IRA volunteer killed in 1987. The man from Coalisland was charged with making false statements to police in relation to a white Ford Transit van allegedly used in the robbery. By the end of 2005, police investigations had resulted in 13 arrests and 22 searches. All charges against the men from Kilcoo and Coalisland were dropped by the Public Prosecution Service in January 2007; Orde described the developments as "a setback".

== Ward trial ==
Chris Ward, one of the two bank officials threatened by the gang during the robbery, was arrested in connection with the robbery on 29 November 2005 and the PSNI searched his home. Another bank employee, a 22-year-old woman who was not named, was also arrested on the same day. On 2 December, the police raided Casement Park, the Gaelic Athletic Association (GAA) stadium and social club in west Belfast, because Ward worked there part-time. The GAA reported the matter to the Irish government, stating that it had not been warned about the large operation.

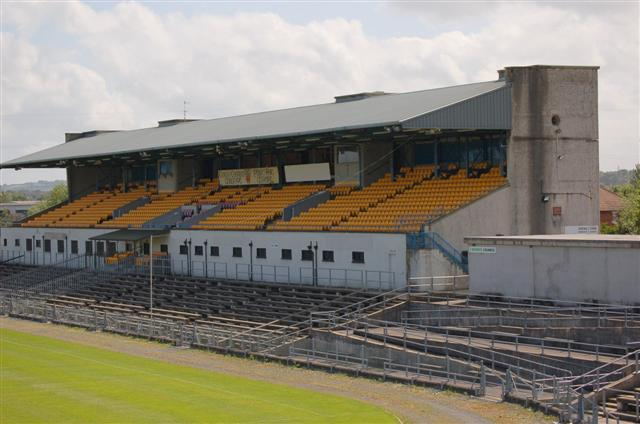
Roger Casement Park in 2007

On 7 December, Ward was prosecuted at Belfast Magistrates' Court for robbery and using a firearm. The prosecution case was based on his actions in the days preceding and during the raid, a suspicious work rota and discrepancies in his original statements to police. Ward denied the charges and claimed that the police were harassing him and his family in an attempt to frame him as the inside man on the job. Ward complained the police had held him in detention longer than the gang had held his family hostage.

Ward was remanded on bail and a date of September 2008 was set for the trial in a Diplock court. At trial for robbery and false imprisonment, the prosecution offered no evidence. Ward was acquitted of all charges and discharged by the judge. The prosecution accepted that the work rota change which underpinned their case had been "the result of a chance decision by management". Ward's defence lawyer claimed he had been the victim of a "Kafka-esque farce".

== Cunningham convictions ==
In March 2009, Ted Cunningham was found guilty at Cork Circuit Court on ten charges of laundering over £3 million which came from the robbery. He was remanded in custody and later received a sentence of ten years' imprisonment. His son was also convicted of one charge of money laundering. Cunningham senior appealed and his conviction was quashed by the Court of Criminal Appeal in May 2012. The court decided that the warrant used to search his house was invalid because it had been issued by the senior Garda officer in charge of the investigation under section 29(1) of the Offences against the State Act, which the Supreme Court had recently found to be repugnant to the Constitution of Ireland. The court ordered a retrial on nine of the ten original counts of money laundering. It directed that the tenth, relating to a sum of money allegedly found in Cunningham's home, was not to be retried. He was again remanded in custody with the possibility of bail.

At the retrial in February 2014, Cunningham pleaded guilty and received a 5-year suspended sentence on two counts of laundering about £275,000. He avoided imprisonment on account of his bad health and his promise to resign from Chesterton Finance. The sums of £2.985 million and €45,000 which had been impounded during police raids were forfeited to the state. Cunningham sued Northern Bank in 2020 regarding the impounded money, alleging that the Gardai had seized it improperly. He began a new case aiming to clear his name in 2023.

== Legacy ==
Northern Bank announced soon after the robbery that it would replace its £10, £20, £50 and £100 notes; the new banknotes would have different colours, new logos and altered serial numbers. By March 2005 it had done so, meaning that the uncirculated banknotes which had been stolen would be hard to spend. This still left the £4.5 million in notes from other banks and £5.5 million in old, used Northern Bank notes, which were untraceable.

After the Good Friday Agreement of 1998 had provided hope of an ending to The Troubles, the political situation in Belfast remained tense. By the end of 2004, the different parties in the Northern Ireland peace process were reaching agreement, but at a meeting on 8 December at which Bertie Ahern, Tony Blair, Gerry Adams and Martin McGuinness were present, the Sinn Féin representatives refused to promise that the Provisional IRA would stop its criminal activity. Less than two weeks later, the Northern Bank robbery again inflamed tensions since despite the denials of Sinn Féin, the IRA was blamed by Ahern and Blair for the heist. In 2005, the UK Secretary of State for Northern Ireland Paul Murphy remarked "I cannot hide my own judgment that the impact is deeply damaging". Mark Durkan, leader of the Irish nationalist Social Democratic and Labour Party condemned the IRA as a criminal enterprise. The IRA rejected the statements and Adams commented "the IRA statement is obviously a direct consequence of the retrograde stance of the two governments [...] It is evidence of a deepening crisis and I regret that very much."

Leaked US communications revealed that Ahern suspected Adams and McGuinness had known about the robbery and this made his attitude towards them toughen. Garda surveillance had recorded Adams meeting with Ted Cunningham before the heist took place. Alongside the murder of Robert McCartney in January 2005, the robbery caused the US government to block fund-raising for Sinn Féin in the United States (the ban was dropped in November 2005). When Adams denied that the IRA were involved in any way, the Ulster Unionist Party (UUP) announced it could not share power with Sinn Féin any longer and withdrew from the coalition governing Northern Ireland. The UUP Member of Parliament David Burnside accused Bobby Storey under parliamentary privilege in the House of Commons of being the IRA's intelligence chief and the planner of the Northern Bank robbery. A 2021 BBC documentary presented by the journalists Darragh MacIntyre and Sam McBride also suggested that the heist had been organised by Storey.

The events of the theft were given a book-length account in Ripe for the Picking: The Inside Story of the Northern Bank Robbery (published in 2006) and a former IRA bank robber released a work of fiction entitled Northern Heist in 2018, about a robbery which bore strong resemblances to the crime. The former head of the Assets Recovery Agency commented in 2014 that he believed the IRA were still struggling to launder some of the money taken in the heist owing to the size of the haul. As of 2023, the robbery remained one of the largest in the history of both the United Kingdom and the Republic of Ireland, and nobody had been held directly responsible. It was the largest cash theft in the UK until the Securitas depot robbery in 2006, when almost £53 million (Note: Equivalent to almost £92 million in 2025) was stolen.

State papers released in 2025 report that British officials privately told Irish counterparts in January 2005 that Bobby Storey had organised the £26.5m Northern Bank robbery in Belfast the previous month.

== See also ==
- City bonds robbery
- List of bank robbers and robberies
