= Newforge =

Irish country club

- Location: Belfast, Northern Ireland
- Country: Ireland
- Coordinates: 54.5583°N 5.9443°W
- As of 28 August 2011; Source: Ground profile

Newforge is a country club in Belfast, Northern Ireland. It was founded in 1956 for members of the Royal Ulster Constabulary but has developed into an open club with multiple sports facilities.

== History ==
Newforge was founded in 1956 after the grounds were purchased by the Royal Ulster Constabulary Athletic Association (RUC AA). Though it was originally a private club for serving and retired police officers, membership was later opened to others.

In 2005, £50,000 from the Northern Bank robbery was found at Newforge; it was believed to have been planted by the IRA in order to frame the police.

In 2012, there were proposals for the RUC AA to change their name to the "Police Athletic Association Northern Ireland" on the grounds that the more generic name would entitle them to more grants for the association and Newforge. Following unionist political objections, the proposal was dropped.

In 2017, Newforge applied for an EU grant but was rejected and vetoed on appeal. The decision was overturned by 2019, with Newforge being awarded €5.8 million.

== Facilities ==
Newforge contains several sports pitches. It is home to Newforge Lane, which is used by PSNI F.C. for association football, and a Gaelic games pitch for PSNI GAA. There is also a hockey pitch, which was upgraded as part of a £5.8m investment in 2023. In 2013, Newforge hosted the World Police and Fire Games. It had also been used as the training facility for Ulster Rugby.

Newforge has a cricket ground. In 2005, the ground hosted a List A match in the 2005 ICC Trophy between Namibia and Papua New Guinea, which Namibia won by 96 runs.
