= Ulster Bank £10 note =

Currency note in Republic of Ireland

The Ulster Bank £10 note is a banknote issued by Ulster Bank. It is valued at ten pounds sterling.

In February 2018 Ulster Bank confirmed that their banknotes would be printed in polymer and be the first United Kingdom banknotes to be printed with vertical designs rather than the usual horizontal designs.

Prior to the introduction of polymer notes Ulster Bank used paper banknotes.

== Design ==
The polymer £10 note from Ulster Bank is part of the "Living in Nature" series. The design includes a butterfly, hare and the outline of Lower Lough Erne.
