= John Boyd Dunlop =

Scottish inventor and veterinary surgeon (1844-1921)

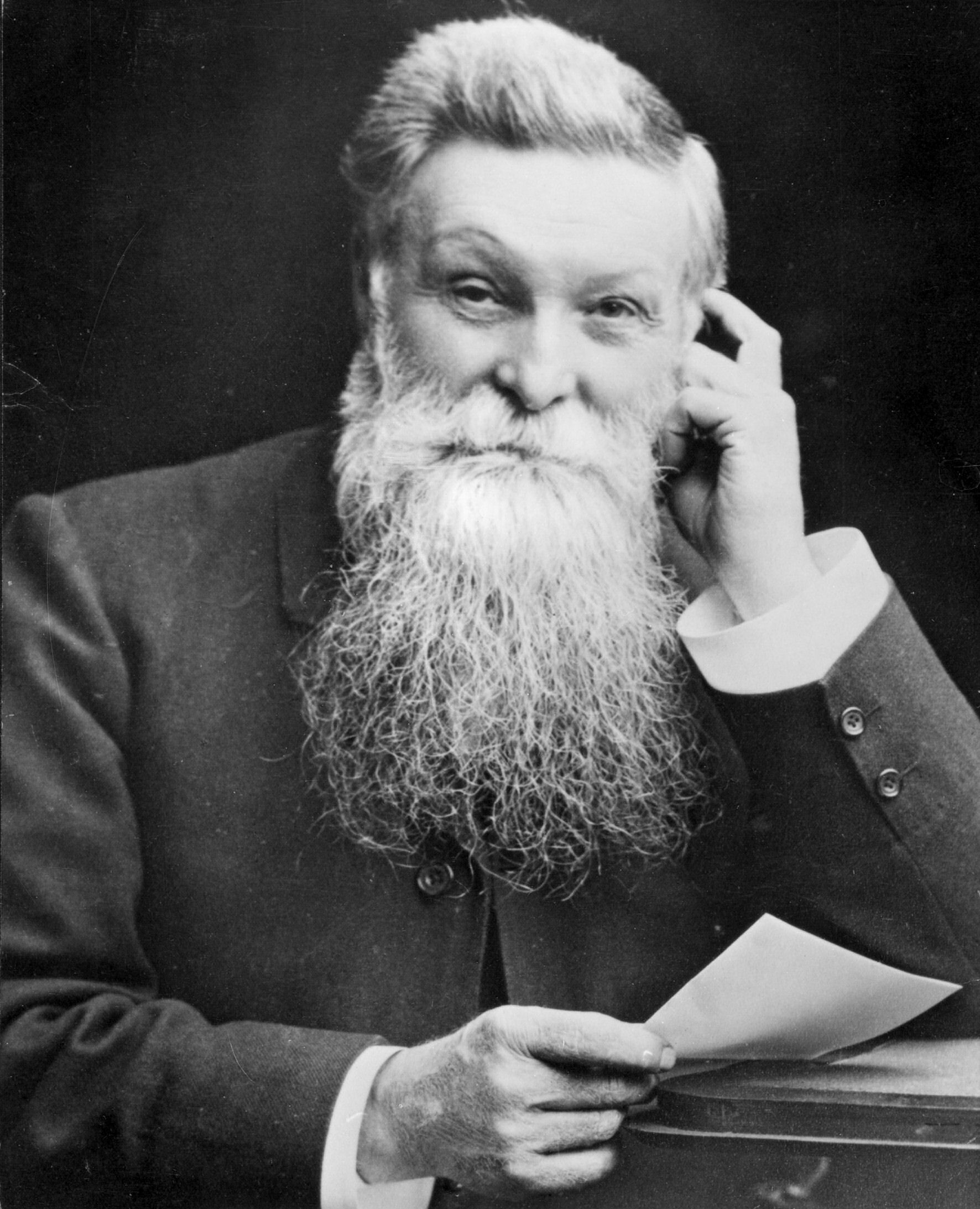
- Born: 5 February 1840; Dreghorn, Ayrshire (now North Ayrshire), Scotland
- Died: 23 October 1921 (aged 81); Dublin, Ireland
- Resting place: Dean's Grange Cemetery
- Education: University of Edinburgh
- Known for: Development of the pneumatic tyre; Co-founder of the original Dunlop Rubber

John Boyd Dunlop (5 February 1840 – 23 October 1921) was a Scottish inventor and veterinary surgeon who spent most of his career in Ireland. Familiar with making rubber devices, he invented the practical pneumatic tyres for his child's tricycle and developed them for use in cycle racing. He sold his rights to the pneumatic tyres to a company he formed with the president of the Irish Cyclists' Association, Harvey du Cros, for a small cash sum and a small shareholding in their pneumatic tyre business. Dunlop withdrew in 1896. The company that bore his name, Dunlop Pneumatic Tyre Company, was not incorporated until later and, despite its name, was Du Cros's creation.

== Veterinary practice ==
He was born on a farm in Dreghorn, North Ayrshire, and studied to be a veterinary surgeon at the Dick Vet, University of Edinburgh, moving to Downpatrick, Ireland in 1867.

Quite early in his life he was told he had been a premature birth, two months before his mother had expected. He convinced himself his health was delicate and throughout his life acted accordingly, but he had no serious illness until he contracted a chill in October 1921 aged 81 and died unexpectedly. Sir Arthur Du Cros described him as a diffident and gentle-mannered man but confident in his abilities.

He married Margaret Stevenson in 1871 and they had a daughter and a son. He established Downe Veterinary Clinic in Downpatrick with his brother James Dunlop before moving to a practice in 38–42 May Street, Belfast where, by the mid 1880s, his was one of the largest practices in Ireland.

Dunlop developed pneumatic tyres for his son's tricycle and soon had them made commercially in Scotland. A cyclist using his tyres began to win all races and drew the attention of Harvey Du Cros. Dunlop sold his rights into a new business with Du Cros for some cash and a small shareholding. With Du Cros he overcame many difficulties experienced by their business, including the loss of his patent rights. In 1892 he retired from his veterinary practice and moved to Dublin soon after Harvey Du Cros with his assistance successfully refloated Booth Bros of Dublin as the Pneumatic Tyre and Booth's Cycle Agency. The pneumatic tyre revolutionised the bicycle industry, which had boomed after the 1885 introduction of J. K. Starley's safety bicycle.

J. B. Dunlop sold out in 1895 and took no further interest in the tyre or rubber business. His remaining business interest was a local drapery.

== Pneumatic tyres ==
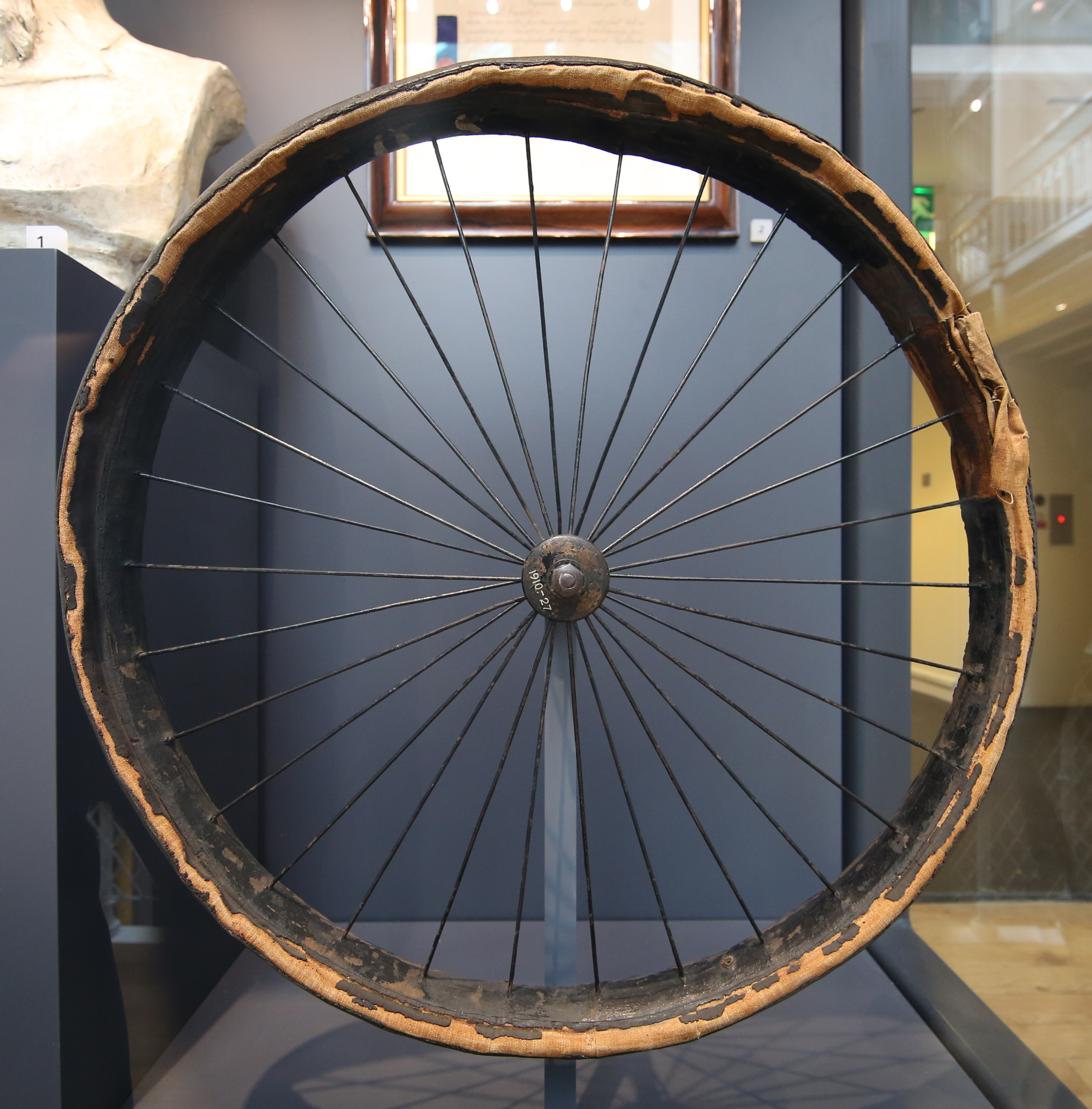
Dunlop's first pneumatic bicycle tyre National Museum of Scotland

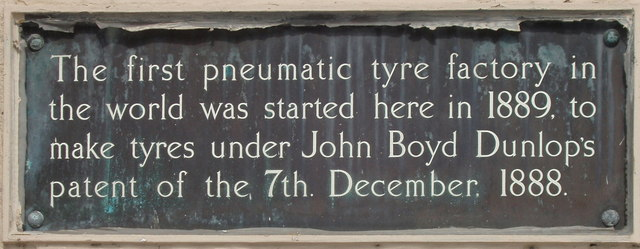
Plaque on the site of Dunlop's tyre factory on Stephen Street, Dublin.

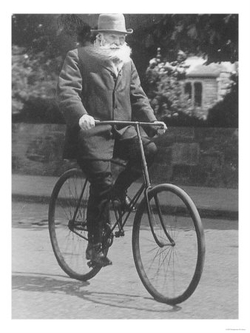
Dunlop on a bicycle c. 1915

In October 1887, John Boyd Dunlop developed the first practical pneumatic or inflatable tyre for his son's tricycle and, using his knowledge and experience with rubber, in the yard of his home in Belfast fitted it to a wooden disc 96 centimetres across. The tyre was an inflated tube of sheet rubber. He then took his wheel and a metal wheel from his son's tricycle and rolled both across the yard together. The metal wheel stopped rolling but the pneumatic continued until it hit a gatepost and rebounded. Dunlop then put pneumatics on both rear wheels of the tricycle. That too rolled better, and Dunlop moved on to larger tyres for a bicycle "with even more startling results". He tested that in Cherryvale sports ground, South Belfast, and a patent was granted on 7 December 1888. Unknown to Dunlop another Scot, Robert William Thomson from Stonehaven, had patented a pneumatic tyre in 1847.

Willie Hume demonstrated the supremacy of Dunlop's tyres in 1889, winning the tyre's first-ever races in Ireland and then England. The captain of the Belfast Cruisers Cycling Club, he became the first member of the public to purchase a bicycle fitted with pneumatic tyres, so Dunlop suggested he should use them in a race. On 18 May 1889 Hume won all four cycling events at the Queen's College Sports in Belfast, and a short while later in Liverpool, won all but one of the cycling events. Among the losers were sons of the president of the Irish Cyclists' Association, Harvey Du Cros. Seeing an opportunity, Du Cros built a personal association with J. B. Dunlop, and together they set up a company which acquired his rights to his patent.

Two years after he was granted the patent, Dunlop was officially informed that it was invalid as Scottish inventor Robert William Thomson (1822–1873), had patented the idea in France in 1846 and in the US in 1847 (see Tyres). To capitalise on pneumatic tyres for bicycles, Dunlop and Du Cros resuscitated a Dublin-listed company and renamed it Pneumatic Tyre and Booth's Cycle Agency. Dunlop retired in 1895. In 1896 Du Cros sold their whole bicycle tyre business to British financier Terah Hooley for £3 million. Hooley arranged some new window-dressing, titled board members, etc., and re-sold the company to the public for £5 million. Du Cros remained head of the business until his death. Early in the 20th century it was renamed Dunlop Rubber.

Though he did not participate after 1895, Dunlop's pneumatic tyre did arrive at a crucial time in the development of road transport. His commercial production of cycle tyres began in late 1890 in Belfast, but the production of car tyres did not begin until 1900, well after his retirement. J. B. Dunlop did not make any great fortune by his invention.

== Death and legacy ==
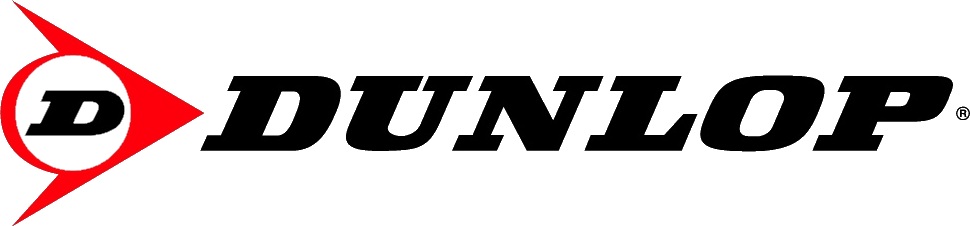
The Dunlop logo is widely recognised around the world

John Boyd Dunlop died at his home in Dublin's Ballsbridge in 1921 and is buried in Deans Grange Cemetery.

Although the Dunlop Pneumatic Tyre Company no longer exists as a corporate entity, the Dunlop name lives on in a number of Dunlop-branded products, including automotive, aerospatial, industrial and sporting products around the world. The Dunlop brand commonly appears as a corporate sponsor of international sporting events such as motor racing and tennis matches.

From the 1980s, Dunlop was commemorated in Northern Ireland when his image featured on the £10 banknote issued by the Northern Bank as part of its Inventor Series. The notes have been re-issued several times, and the banknotes bearing Dunlop's likeness (now issued by the Danske Bank) are still in circulation today.

In 2005, Dunlop was inducted into the Automotive Hall of Fame.

An avenue in the city of Campinas, in southeast Brazil, is also named after him; that is because a Dunlop tyre factory was established there in 1953.

John Boyd Dunlop has been commemorated with a blue plaque by the Ulster Historical Circle for inventing the first successful pneumatic tyre.

In 2025, Dunlop was inducted into the Scottish Engineering Hall of Fame.
