= Ulster Bank £20 note =

The Ulster Bank paper £20 note is a banknote issued by Ulster Bank. It is valued at twenty pounds sterling.

In February 2018 Ulster Bank confirmed that their banknotes would be printed in polymer and be the first United Kingdom banknotes to be printed with vertical designs rather than the usual horizontal designs.

Prior to the introduction of polymer notes Ulster Bank used paper banknotes.

== Design ==
The polymer £20 note from Ulster Bank is part of the "Living in Nature" series. The design includes the eels of Lough Neagh and celebrates the "craic" of Northern Irish life through dancing and celebration including reference to the Halloween celebrations in Derry. The previous paper design consisted of the denomination alongside the Ulster Bank Coat of Arms.
