= Belfast Banking Company =

Bank in Northern Ireland

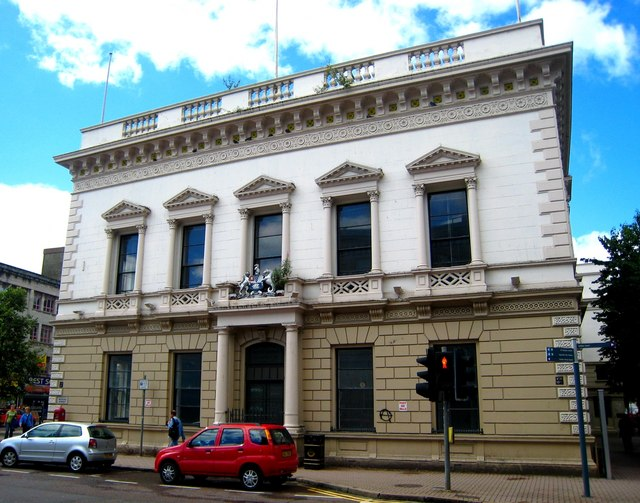
The Assembly Rooms, Belfast which housed a branch of the bank from 1845.

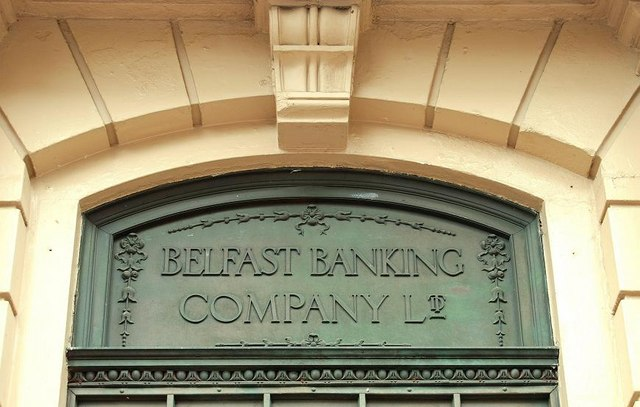
Bank name from above the Assembly Rooms main entrance

The Belfast Banking Company was a bank in Northern Ireland. It was established in 1827 by a merger of Batt's (also known as The Belfast Bank) and Tennant's (The Commercial Bank). The Belfast Banking Company operated primarily in Ulster and following the formation of the Irish Free State sold its branches there to the Royal Bank of Ireland. The Belfast Banking Company was acquired by the London City and Midland Bank in 1917 and in 1970 was merged with Northern Bank, which had also been acquired by the Midland.

== History ==
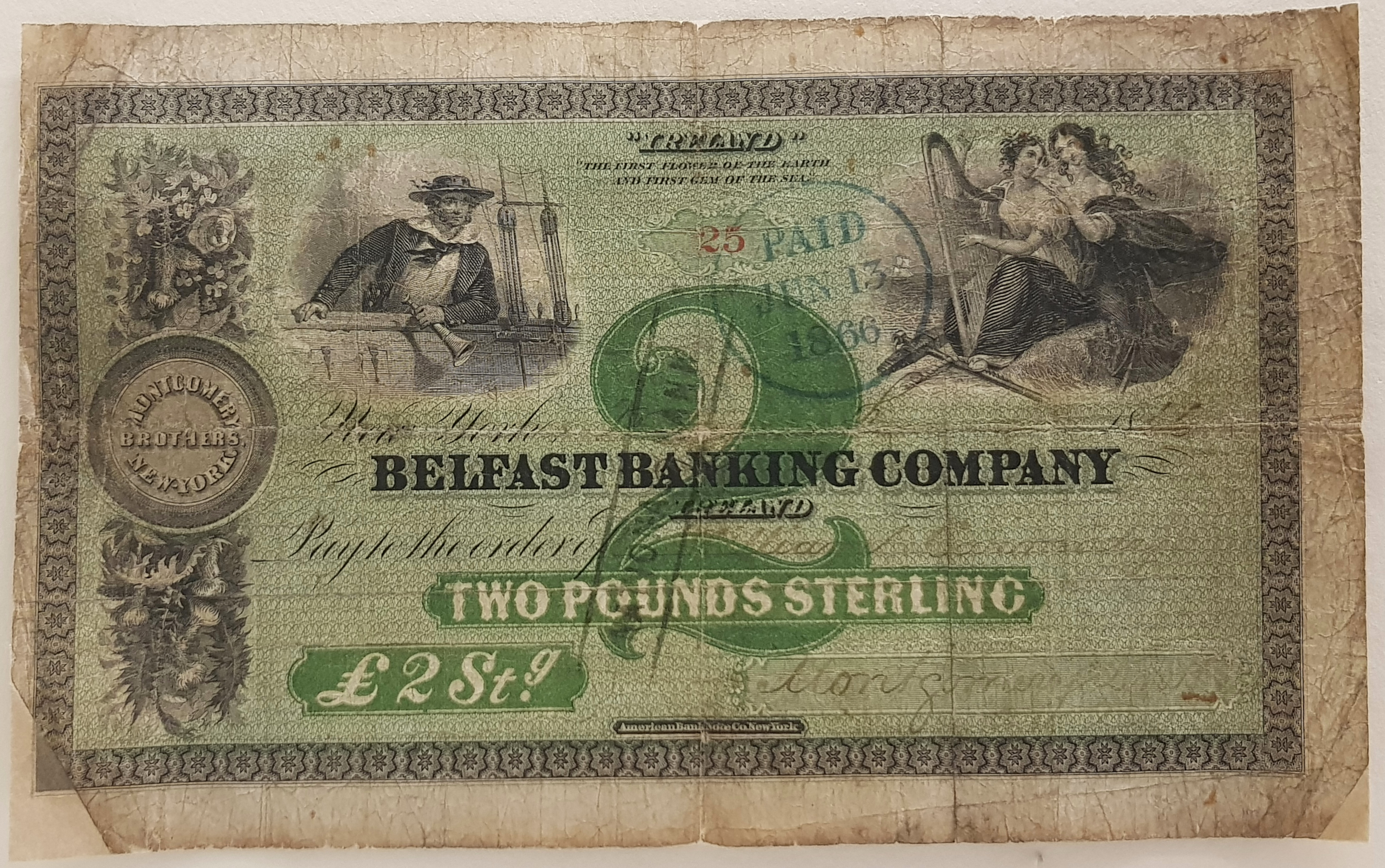
£ 2 note of the New York Branch, printed by the American Banknote Co.

The Belfast Banking Company was established as a limited company on 2 July 1827 by a merger of the last two private banks in Belfast, Ireland: Batt's/The Belfast Bank (established 1808) and Tennant's/The Commercial Bank. The company had 337 shareholders at establishment and opened for business on 1 August 1827. It operated in a similar manner to the Northern Banking Company but focussed almost exclusively on Ulster. The bank did not establish a branch in Dublin until 1892. It did have a New York branch in the 1860s.

In 1917 the Belfast Banking Company was sold to the London City and Midland Bank. Seventeen bank staff were killed while serving with the British armed forces in the First World War and are commemorated in a memorial window at St Anne's Cathedral in Belfast. In the year following Irish independence in 1922 the 20 Belfast Banking Company branches in the newly established Irish Free State were sold to the Royal Bank of Ireland. By the 1920s the bank had permission to issue banknotes in Northern Ireland. In 1927 staff raised £500 to name, in perpetuity, a bed at the Royal Victoria Hospital after the bank to mark its centenary.

== Merger ==
In 1965 the Midland Bank acquired the Northern Bank and set in place measures to merge the two companies. This process was complicated as both banks were note-issuing entities and if a third company was created, as would be usual practice, it would not hold the same powers. The merger was achieved on 1 July 1970, through an act of the British parliament, with the new company using the Northern Bank name. The bank asked that its staff wear red carnations to mark a "happy and memorable day". There followed a rationalisation of the merged company's 287 branches, many of which were located in the same street as others. The company was later acquired by the National Australia Bank and is now owned by Danske Bank and trades under their brand.
