= Danske Bank (Northern Ireland) =

Irish banking institution

Northern Bank Limited

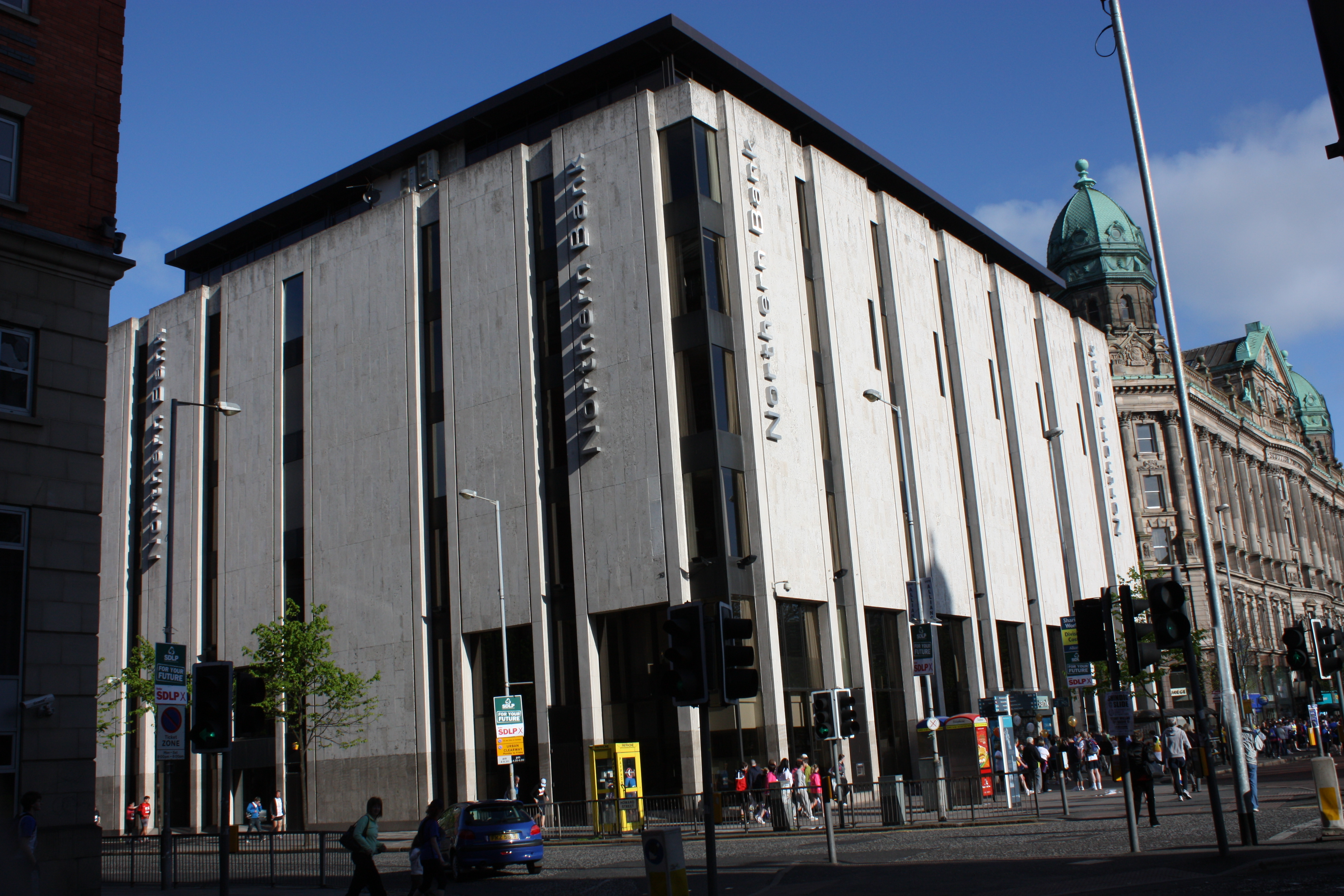
- Northern Bank headquarters in Belfast, prior to the Danske Bank rebrand
- Trade name: Danske Bank
- Type: Private limited company
- Industry: Financial services
- Founded: Belfast, Ireland (1824)
- Headquarters: Belfast, Northern Ireland
- Area served: United Kingdom (previously also served Republic of Ireland)
- Key people: Martin Stewart (Chairman); Julie-Ann Haines (CEO)
- Products: Commercial banking
- Parent: Danske Bank A/S
- Website: danskebank.co.uk

Northern Bank Limited, trading as Danske Bank, is a retail bank in Northern Ireland. Northern Banking Company Limited was formed from a private bank, with the Deed of Partnership being signed on 1 August 1824. It is one of the oldest banks in Ireland with its private banking history dating back to 1809. Northern Bank took on the name of its parent company Danske Bank as its trading name in November 2012. It operates in Northern Ireland and Great Britain. In Northern Ireland, the Bank issues its own banknotes.

Danske Bank is a standalone business unit within the Danske Bank Group and operates under a UK banking licence.

== History ==
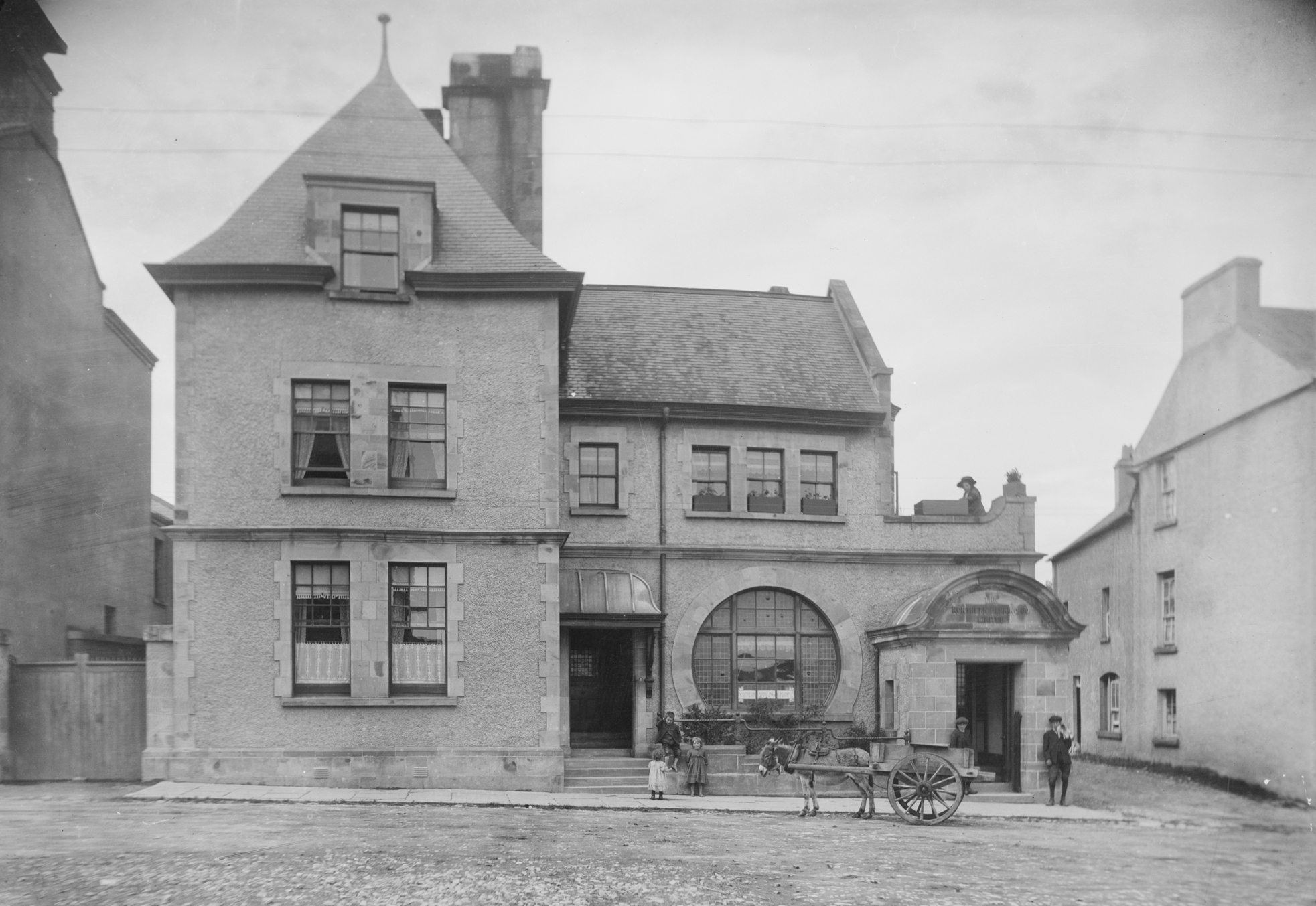
Branch in Mohill, circa 1905

A private Northern Bank was founded in Belfast in 1809 as the Northern Banking Partnership. Those partners were Belfast merchants John Hamilton, Hugh Montgomery, James Orr and John Sloan. On 1 August 1824 it became a Joint Stock bank called The Northern Banking Company Limited. The bank expanded across Ireland, opening its first branch in the south in 1840.

On 1 January 1929 the name of the bank was changed from Northern Banking Company Limited to Northern Bank Limited. In 1965, the Northern Bank Limited was acquired by the Midland Bank, a London-based bank which had acquired the Belfast Banking Company in 1917. In 1970, the Midland's two Northern Ireland subsidiaries were merged with the name of the merged bank continuing as Northern Bank Limited. Under Midland's ownership, Northern Bank shared its parent company's branding and the Griffin logo.

In 1986 Midland re-organised its British and Irish operations, and as part of this process it separated its Northern Bank branches in the Republic of Ireland and transferred into a newly formed company called Northern Bank (Ireland) Limited.

=== Acquisition by National Australia Bank ===
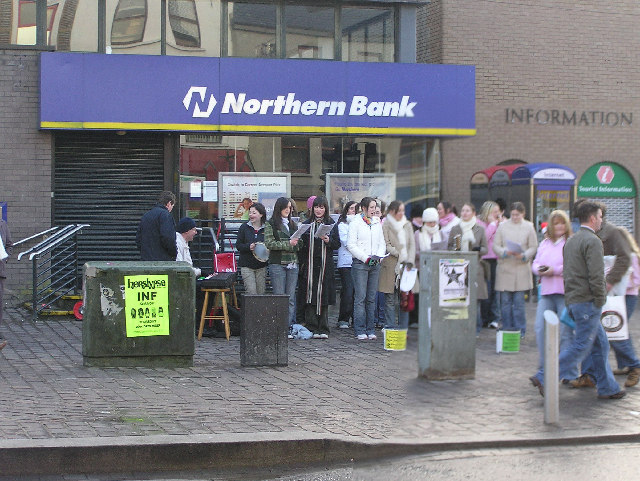
After 1988, Northern Bank branding changed to a hexagonal 'N' logo, as seen on this branch in Omagh.

Midland Bank ran into severe financial difficulty as a result of its 1981 acquisition of Crocker National Bank in the US and was forced to divest itself of assets to restore stability. In 1988, Midland sold off its subsidiaries, namely the Clydesdale Bank in Scotland, Northern Bank Limited and Northern Bank (Ireland) Limited, all of which were acquired by National Australia Bank. After this, Northern Bank (Ireland) Limited was renamed National Irish Bank. The Northern Bank brand name continued in Northern Ireland, but a new logo was introduced, a stylised "N" in a hexagon shape. In 2002, the bank's logotype (the word "Northern") was changed to match that of the National Australia Bank.

=== Acquisition by Danske Bank ===
In December 2004 the Denmark-based Danske Bank Group agreed to acquire Northern Bank and National Irish Bank for £967m. The sale of the two banks marked National Australia Bank's exit from the Irish banking markets. Don Price remained as CEO, but was later replaced by Gerry Mallon in June 2008. The acquisition was completed in 2005 and Danske Bank invested approximately £100m in Northern Bank. As part of this process, National Irish Bank was separated from the Northern Bank and given its own dedicated management team. Both Northern & National Irish Bank also migrated over to Danske Bank's technology platform with a centralised contact centre set up to deal with all incoming calls to the branches of both banks. From April 2006 the two banks also adopted new corporate identities which were based on a variation of the Danske Bank logo.

On 1 June 2012 brand separation between Northern Bank and National Irish Bank was also reversed, with the two banks merged under the Northern Bank management team. On 19 November 2012 the bank formally dropped its Northern Bank name and began trading as Danske Bank. The first Danish branding was unveiled with new signage at the company's head office in Donegall Square. Since the rebrand, cheques and banknotes issued by the bank bear the legend "Danske Bank is a trading name of Northern Bank Limited". Northern Bank trading as Danske Bank continues to issue pound sterling banknotes in Northern Ireland, and notes issued since 2013 now bear the Danske Bank brand name.

In 2008 Northern Bank embarked on a £3m investment programme to upgrade facilities at three of its Northern Ireland branches.

== Organisational structure and leadership ==
As of July 2026, Julie-Ann Haines is the CEO of Danske Bank UK. The bank is organised into three business divisions.

Shaun McAnee is managing director of Corporate & Business Banking. Aisling Press is managing director of Personal Banking. Richard Caldwell is managing director, Great Britain.

Stephen Matchett is Deputy CEO & chief financial officer.

== Banknotes ==
A£10 note bearing the Danske Bank branding issued in 2013.

A 2005 reissue £20 note, bearing the former Northern Bank brand name.

Northern Bank trading as Danske Bank continues to issue its own banknotes, a practice which was abolished in England and Wales in the early twentieth century. Northern Bank trading as Danske Bank notes are pound sterling notes and equal in value to Bank of England notes and should not be confused with banknotes of the former Irish pound, a separate currency which was replaced by the Euro in the Republic of Ireland in 2002; nor should Northern Bank trading as Danske Bank notes be confused with banknotes of the Danish Krone issued by the Danish National Bank, in spite of the Danish name of the issuing bank.

Following the acquisition of Northern Bank by Danske Bank, banknotes issued since June 2013 now bear Danske Bank branding in place of the Northern Bank name; otherwise the designs remain identical to the previous issue. The phrase 'a trading name of Northern Bank Limited' is now in place after Danske Bank. Older banknotes bearing the Northern Bank name are still in circulation and continue to be acceptable for payments as they are gradually withdrawn. Danske Bank has also ceased issue of £50 and £100 notes and will in future only print £10 and £20 notes.

Danske Bank does not issue £5 notes, but a special commemorative £5 note was issued by the Northern Bank to mark the Year 2000. Uniquely among sterling notes, this was a vertical polymer banknote, printed by the Canadian Bank Note Company (CBN) on Australian synthetic polymer substrate instead of paper, making Northern Ireland the only part of the UK to have issued a plastic banknote prior to Scotland & England issuing the £5 polymer notes in Autumn 2016. It is the only one of the bank's pre-2004 notes still in circulation; all others were recalled following the 2004 robbery.

As promissory notes, the current issue of the banknotes bear the inscription below the Danske Bank logo, "a trading name of Northern Bank Limited which promises to pay the bearer on demand", followed by the monetary value of the note. Most Northern Bank banknotes feature an illustration on the reverse side of the portico of Belfast City Hall, sculpted by F. W. Pomeroy. The front of most notes depict a range of notable people associated with industry in Northern Ireland. The designs currently in circulation are:

| Denomination | Obverse illustration | Significance | Notes |
|---|---|---|---|
| £5 | US Space Shuttle | | Northern Bank polymer note |
| £10 | J. B. Dunlop | Inventor of the first pneumatic tyre in Belfast, 1887 | Reissued as Danske Bank note |
| £20 | Harry Ferguson | Inventor of the Ferguson P99 Formula One racing car, the Ferguson Tractor and the first Irish aviator | Reissued as Danske Bank note |
| £50 | Sir Samuel Cleland Davidson | Founder of the Belfast Sirocco Works and pioneer of air conditioning | Northern Bank note, to be withdrawn |
| £100 | Sir James Martin | Inventor of the aircraft ejector seat, | Northern Bank note, to be withdrawn |

=== 2005 reissue ===
An old design £20 Northern Bank note withdrawn in 2005.

Following the £26.5 million robbery in 2004 (see below), Northern Bank announced on 7 January 2005 that all its notes were to be recalled and reissued in revised designs and using the updated Northern Bank logo already used at the 10-pound note dated 2004. The reissue began on 14 March 2005 and was scheduled to take one month; old notes remain exchangeable at branches of Northern Bank. The principal colours of Northern Bank notes of greater than £5 face value were changed with the 2005 reissue:

| Denomination | Pre-2005 | 2005–19 | 2019– |
|---|---|---|---|
| £5 | blue | (not re-issued) | |
| £10 | brown | green | |
| £20 | purple | blue | |
| £50 | green | purple | (not re-issued) |
| £100 | black | red | (not re-issued) |

On the older notes, the bank's N symbol was enclosed in a vertical rectangular bar above the 'Northern' logo; after reissue, the N monogram was presented as a free-standing hexagonal graphic above the new italic Northern logo. After the Danske rebrand, Northern branding has been replaced with the Danske Bank logo on notes issued after 2013.

=== 2019 polymer note ===
On 6 November 2018, Danske Bank announced the launch of a new polymer £10 banknote. The new note keeps the base design concept of the existing paper note but with subtle colour and feature upgrades – including a revised main portrait of inventor John Dunlop. In a change, the polymer note will also include an image of Mr Dunlop's son. The notes come into circulation on 27 February 2019. Meanwhile a £20 note has also been issued.

== Robbery ==
On 20 December 2004 the cash centre at the bank's headquarters in Belfast was raided, and £26.5 million stolen. Most of this consisted of uncirculated Northern Bank notes, as well as millions in used notes. There was also over a million pounds in other currencies. The police and government as well as other major political figures in both Ireland and the United Kingdom accused the Provisional Irish Republican Army of being responsible. It is still unknown who committed the robbery.

On 9 October 2008 the trial of the only man to be charged with the robbery collapsed when Chris Ward, 26, was found not guilty.
