= Central banks and currencies of Asia-Pacific =

This is a list of central banks and currencies of Asia-Pacific.

Country	Currency	Central bank	Peg
Afghanistan	Afghan afghani	Da Afghanistan Bank	
Armenia	Armenian dram	Central Bank of Armenia	
Azerbaijan	Azerbaijani manat	Central Bank of Azerbaijan	
Bahrain	Bahraini dinar	Central Bank of Bahrain	1 EUR = BD 0.376
Bangladesh	Bangladeshi taka	Bangladesh Bank	
Bhutan	Bhutanese ngultrum	Royal Monetary Authority of Bhutan	INR at par
Brunei	Brunei dollar	Autoriti Monetari Brunei Darussalam	SGD at par
Cyprus	Euro	European Central Bank	float
Cambodia	Cambodian riel	National Bank of Cambodia	
China	Renminbi	People's Bank of China	Partially (basket)
East Timor	United States dollar	Banco Central de Timor-Leste	float
Fiji	Fijian dollar	Reserve Bank of Fiji	
Georgia	Georgian lari	National Bank of Georgia	
Hong Kong	Hong Kong dollar	Hong Kong Monetary Authority	1 USD = 7.80 HKD
India	Indian rupee	Reserve Bank of India	
Indonesia	Indonesian rupiah	Bank Indonesia	
Iran	Iranian rial	Central Bank of the Islamic Republic of Iran	
Iraq	Iraqi dinar	Central Bank of Iraq	
Israel	Israeli new shekel	Bank of Israel	
Japan	Japanese yen	Bank of Japan	float
Jordan	Jordanian dinar	Central Bank of Jordan	1 USD = 0.708 JOD (buy); 1 USD = 0.710 JOD (sell)
Kazakhstan	Kazakhstani tenge	National Bank of Kazakhstan	
Kiribati	Kiribati dollar	Reserve Bank of Australia	AUD at par
Kuwait	Kuwaiti dinar	Central Bank of Kuwait	1 USD = 0.29963 KWD
Kyrgyzstan	Kyrgyzstani som	National Bank of the Kyrgyz Republic	
Laos	Lao kip	Lao People's Democratic Republic	
Lebanon	Lebanese pound	Banque du Liban	1 USD = 1507.5 LBP
Macao	Macanese pataca	Monetary Authority of Macau	1 HKD = 1.03 MOP
Malaysia	Malaysian ringgit	Bank Negara Malaysia	
Maldives	Maldivian rufiyaa	Maldives Monetary Authority	
Mongolia	Mongolian tögrög	Bank of Mongolia	
Myanmar	Burmese kyat	Central Bank of Myanmar	
Nepal	Nepalese rupee	Nepal Rastra Bank	1 INR = 1.6000 NPR (buy); 1 INR = 1.6015 NPR (sell)
North Korea	North Korean won	Central Bank of the Democratic People's Republic of Korea	
Oman	Omani rial	Central Bank of Oman	1 OMR = USD 2.6008
Pakistan	Pakistani rupee	State Bank of Pakistan	
Papua New Guinea	Papua New Guinean kina	Bank of Papua New Guinea	
Philippines	Philippine peso	Bangko Sentral ng Pilipinas	
Qatar	Qatari riyal	Qatar Central Bank	1 USD = 3.64 QAR
Russia	Russian ruble	Bank of Russia	
Saudi Arabia	Saudi riyal	Saudi Central Bank	1 USD = 3.75 SAR
Samoa	Samoan tālā	Central Bank of Samoa	
Solomon Islands	Solomon Islands dollar	Central Bank of Solomon Islands	
South Korea	South Korean won	Bank of Korea	
Singapore	Singapore dollar	Monetary Authority of Singapore	
Sri Lanka	Sri Lankan rupee	Central Bank of Sri Lanka	
Syria	Syrian pound	Central Bank of Syria	
Taiwan	New Taiwan dollar	Central Bank of the Republic of China (Taiwan)	
Tajikistan	Tajikistani somoni	National Bank of Tajikistan	
Thailand	Thai baht	Bank of Thailand	
Turkey	Turkish lira	Central Bank of the Republic of Turkey	
Turkmenistan	Turkmen manat	Central Bank of Turkmenistan	
Tuvalu	Tuvaluan dollar	Reserve Bank of Australia	AUD at par
Tonga	Tongan paʻanga	National Reserve Bank of Tonga	
United Arab Emirates	United Arab Emirates dirham	Central Bank of the United Arab Emirates	1 USD = 3.6725 AED
Uzbekistan	Uzbekistani soum	Central Bank of the Republic of Uzbekistan	
Vanuatu	Vanuatu vatu	Reserve Bank of Vanuatu	
Vietnam	Vietnamese đồng	State Bank of Vietnam	
Yemen	Yemeni rial	Central Bank of Yemen	
Cook Islands	New Zealand dollar	Reserve Bank of New Zealand	
New Zealand	New Zealand dollar	Reserve Bank of New Zealand	
Niue	New Zealand dollar	Reserve Bank of New Zealand	
Australia	Australian dollar	Reserve Bank of Australia	float
Kiribati	Australian dollar	Reserve Bank of Australia	float
Nauru	Australian dollar	Reserve Bank of Australia	float
Tuvalu	Australian dollar	Reserve Bank of Australia	float
Marshall Islands	United States dollar	Federal Reserve System	float
Micronesia	United States dollar	Federal Reserve System	float
Palau	United States dollar	Federal Reserve System	float
French Polynesia	CFP franc	Institut d'émission d'outre-mer	1 EUR = 119.33174 XPF
New Caledonia	CFP franc	Institut d'émission d'outre-mer	1 EUR = 119.33174 XPF
Wallis and Futuna	CFP franc	Institut d'émission d'outre-mer	1 EUR = 119.33174 XPF

== See also ==
- Currency
- Economy of Asia
- Economy of Oceania
- List of banks in Asia
- List of banks in Oceania
- List of currencies in Asia
- List of currencies in Oceania
- List of Asian stock exchanges
- List of stock exchanges in Oceania
