= Guardian (polymer) =

Guardian is the trademark name of a polymer originally manufactured by Securency International, a joint venture between the Reserve Bank of Australia and Innovia Films Ltd. The latter completed acquisition of the former's stake in 2013.

Its production involves gravity feeding a molten polymer, composed of extruded polypropylene and other polyolefins, through a four-storey chamber. This creates sheets of the substrate used as the base material by many central banks in the printing of polymer banknotes.

== Production ==
Polypropylene is processed to create pellets. These pellets are extruded from a core extruder in conjunction with polyolefin pellets from two "skin layer" extruders, and are combined into a molten polymer. This consists of a 37.5μm thick polypropylene sheet sandwiched between two 0.1 μm polyolefin sheets, creating a thin film 37.7 μm thick.

The molten polymer undergoes snap cooling as it passes by gravity feeding through a brass mandrel, which imparts on the thin film many properties, including its transparency. The cast tube material is then reheated and blown into a large bubble using air pressure and temperature. At the base of the four-storey chamber convergence rollers collapse the tube into a flat sheet consisting of two layers of the thin film. This creates the base biaxially-oriented polypropylene substrate of 75.4 μm thickness, called ClarityC by Innovia Films.

The base substrate is slit as it exits the convergence rollers. Four 3-micrometre (0.00012 in) thick layers of (usually white) opacifier are applied to the substrate, two on the upper surface and two on the lower surface. A mask prevents the deposition of the opacifier on parts of the substrate that are intended to remain transparent. These overcoat layers protect the substrate from soiling and impart on it its characteristic texture, and increase the overall thickness to 87.5 μm. The resulting product is the Guardian substrate.

The opacifier conversion phase involves the use of resin and solvents, creating volatile organic compounds (VOCs) as by-products that are combusted in a thermal oxidizer. The resulting polymer substrate then passes through a rotary printing press using chrome-plated copper cylinders. After printing, the holographic security foil is incorporated into the base substrate. This is then cut into sheets and transported to the banknote printing companies in wooden boxes as a secure shipment.

== Properties ==
Guardian is a non-porous and non-fibrous substrate. Because of this, it is "impervious to water and other liquids", and so remains clean for longer than a paper substrate. It is difficult to initiate a tear on the substrate, which has higher tear initiation resistance than paper.

== Polymer banknotes ==
Guardian is used in the printing of polymer banknotes by many central banks.

It is the base material used for currencies printed by:

Country	Central bank	Currency	Banknotes
Australia	Reserve Bank of Australia	Australian dollar	
Bangladesh	Bangladesh Bank	Bangladeshi taka	
Brunei	Brunei Currency and Monetary Board	Brunei dollar	
Canada	Bank of Canada	Canadian dollar	Frontier Series
Chile	Central Bank of Chile	Chilean peso	
Costa Rica	Central Bank of Costa Rica	Costa Rican colón	
Dominican Republic	Central Bank of the Dominican Republic	Dominican peso	
Guatemala	Bank of Guatemala	Guatemalan quetzal	
Honduras	Central Bank of Honduras	Honduran lempira	
Hong Kong	Hong Kong Monetary Authority	Hong Kong dollar	
Indonesia	Bank of Indonesia	Indonesian rupiah	
Israel	Bank of Israel	Israeli new shekel	
Malaysia	Bank Negara Malaysia	Malaysian ringgit	
Mauritania	Central Bank of Mauritania	Mauritanian ouguiya	
Mauritius	Bank of Mauritius	Mauritian rupee	
Mexico	Bank of Mexico	Mexican peso	
Mozambique	Bank of Mozambique	Mozambican metical	
Nepal	Nepal Rastra Bank	Nepalese rupee	
New Zealand	Reserve Bank of New Zealand	New Zealand dollar	
Nicaragua	Central Bank of Nicaragua	Nicaraguan córdoba	
Nigeria	Central Bank of Nigeria	Nigerian naira	
Papua New Guinea	Bank of Papua New Guinea	Papua New Guinean kina	
Paraguay	Central Bank of Paraguay	Paraguayan guaraní	
Romania	National Bank of Romania	Romanian leu	
Samoa	Central Bank of Samoa	Samoan tālā	
Singapore	Monetary Authority of Singapore	Singapore dollar	
Thailand	Bank of Thailand	Thai baht	
United Kingdom	Bank of England	Pound Sterling	
Vanuatu	Reserve Bank of Vanuatu	Vanuatu vatu	
Vietnam	State Bank of Vietnam	Vietnamese đồng	
Zambia	Bank of Zambia	Zambian kwacha	

In 1993, the Bank of Indonesia issued a commemorative Rp 50,000 banknote and the Central Bank of Kuwait issued a د.ك1 banknote. In 1998, the Bank Negara Malaysia issued a commemorative RM50 banknote, and the Central Bank of Sri Lanka issued a commemorative Rs200 banknote. In 1999, the Northern Bank of Northern Ireland issued a commemorative £5 banknote, and the Central Bank of the Republic of China in Taiwan issued a commemorative NT$50 banknote. In 2000, the Central Bank of Brazil issued a commemorative R$10 banknote and the People's Bank of China issued a commemorative ¥100 banknote. In 2001, the Central Bank of Solomon Islands issued a commemorative SI$2 banknote. In 2009, the Bank of Mexico issued a commemorative $100 banknote.
