= List of countries by real GDP growth rate =

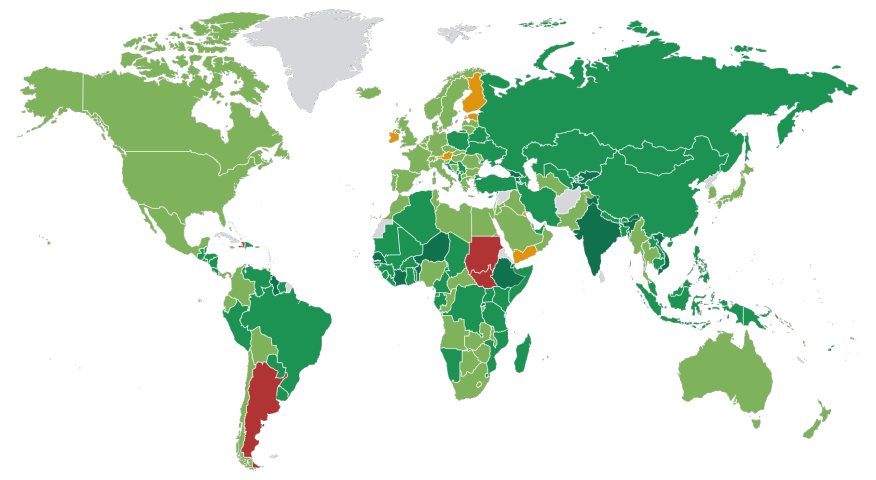
Countries by real GDP growth rate in % for 2024 (IMF WEO database): below −2.7 −2.7 to 0.0 0.0 to 2.9 / 3.0 to 5.9 above 5.9 no data

This article includes lists of countries and dependent territories sorted by their real gross domestic product and gross national income, growth rate and List of countries by GNI (real) per capita; the rate of growth of the total value of all final goods and services produced within a state in a given year compared with the previous year. The figures are from the International Monetary Fund (IMF) World Economic Outlook Database, unless otherwise specified.

This list is not to be confused with the list of countries by real GDP per capita growth, which is the percentage change of GDP per person taking into account the changing population of the country. List of countries by GNI per capita growth measures changes in gross national income per capita.

== List ==
As referenced in the introductory paragraph, the figures in the following list are from the International Monetary Fund World Economic Outlook Database (2026) unless otherwise specified.

List of countries by real GDP growth rate

Growth by country
Country	Continent	Rate (%)
Albania	Europe	3.5
Algeria	Africa	3.8
Andorra	Europe	1.9
Angola	Africa	4.4
Antigua and Barbuda	North America	2.4
Argentina	South America	2.1
Armenia	Asia	5.5
Aruba	North America	3.7
Australia	Oceania	1.9
Austria	Europe	0.6
Azerbaijan	Asia	1.7
Bahamas	North America	2.5
Bahrain	Asia	−11.3
Bangladesh	Asia	3.6
Barbados	North America	1.8
Belarus	Europe	1.9
Belgium	Europe	0.7
Belize	North America	1.9
Benin	Africa	7.0
Bhutan	Asia	7.5
Bolivia	South America	−3.0
Bosnia and Herzegovina	Europe	2.3
Botswana	Africa	4.4
Brazil	South America	2.2
Brunei	Asia	1.9
Bulgaria	Europe	2.6
Burkina Faso	Africa	4.4
Burundi	Africa	3.6
Cabo Verde	Africa	5.0
Cambodia	Asia	3.0
Cameroon	Africa	3.2
Canada	North America	1.1
Central African Republic	Africa	2.7
Chad	Africa	4.5
Chile	South America	0.6
China	Asia	4.5
Colombia	South America	2.2
Comoros	Africa	2.9
Costa Rica	North America	3.5
Croatia	Europe	2.2
Cyprus	Asia	2.9
Czech Republic	Europe	1.8
Denmark	Europe	3.7
Djibouti	Africa	5.6
Dominica	North America	3.1
Dominican Republic	North America	4.6
DR Congo	Africa	5.2
East Timor	Asia	4.1
Ecuador	South America	2.5
Egypt	Africa	5.1
El Salvador	North America	4.5
Equatorial Guinea	Africa	−1.7
Estonia	Europe	2.1
Eswatini	Africa	3.7
Ethiopia	Africa	9.2
Fiji	Oceania	1.9
Finland	Europe	1.7
France	Europe	0.4
Gabon	Africa	3.0
Gambia	Africa	5.1
Georgia	Asia	7.2
Germany	Europe	1.3
Ghana	Africa	5.7
Greece	Europe	1.8
Grenada	North America	3.9
Guatemala	North America	4.0
Guinea	Africa	7.2
Guinea-Bissau	Africa	4.7
Guyana	South America	22.3
Haiti	North America	−1.7
Honduras	North America	3.3
Hong Kong	Asia	3.8
Hungary	Europe	1.9
Iceland	Europe	1.4
India	Asia	7.0
Indonesia	Asia	5.1
Iran	Asia	−7.6
Iraq	Asia	−16.0
Ireland	Europe	−1.0
Israel	Asia	4.5
Italy	Europe	0.8
Ivory Coast	Africa	6.2
Jamaica	North America	0
Japan	Asia	0.7
Jordan	Asia	2.7
Kazakhstan	Asia	4.4
Kenya	Africa	4.5
Kiribati	Oceania	3.1
Kosovo	Europe	3.3
Kuwait	Asia	−16.7
Kyrgyzstan	Asia	6.1
Laos	Asia	4.0
Latvia	Europe	2.2
Lesotho	Africa	1.1
Liberia	Africa	5.1
Libya	Africa	3.3
Liechtenstein	Europe	−0.4
Lithuania	Europe	2.9
Luxembourg	Europe	1.6
Macao	Asia	3.0
Madagascar	Africa	3.6
Malawi	Africa	2.2
Malaysia	Asia	5.2
Maldives	Asia	1.0
Mali	Africa	5.5
Malta	Europe	3.7
Marshall Islands	Oceania	3.7
Mauritania	Africa	4.4
Mauritius	Africa	3.4
Mexico	North America	1.6
Micronesia	Oceania	0.7
Moldova	Europe	1.5
Mongolia	Asia	6.2
Montenegro	Europe	3.0
Morocco	Africa	4.5
Mozambique	Africa	0.5
Myanmar	Asia	2.0
Namibia	Africa	2.4
Nauru	Oceania	2.1
Nepal	Asia	3.6
Netherlands	Europe	1.5
New Zealand	Oceania	2.0
Nicaragua	North America	3.8
Niger	Africa	7.0
Nigeria	Africa	4.2
North Macedonia	Europe	3.5
Norway	Europe	1.5
Oman	Asia	4.1
Pakistan	Asia	3.6
Palau	Oceania	4.3
Panama	North America	5.0
Papua New Guinea	Oceania	3.1
Paraguay	South America	4.5
Peru	South America	3.0
Philippines	Asia	3.4
Poland	Europe	3.4
Portugal	Europe	2.1
Puerto Rico	North America	−0.1
Qatar	Asia	−15.6
Republic of the Congo	Africa	3.5
Romania	Europe	0.7
Russia	Europe	1.1
Rwanda	Africa	7.4
Saint Kitts and Nevis	North America	2.0
Saint Lucia	North America	2.0
Saint Vincent and the Grenadines	North America	1.8
Samoa	Oceania	0.4
San Marino	Europe	1.3
São Tomé and Príncipe	Africa	0.4
Saudi Arabia	Asia	−3.3
Senegal	Africa	-
Serbia	Europe	3.3
Seychelles	Africa	1.0
Sierra Leone	Africa	4.0
Singapore	Asia	5.0
Slovak Republic	Europe	0.8
Slovenia	Europe	3.2
Solomon Islands	Oceania	2.7
Somalia	Africa	2.3
South Africa	Africa	1.0
South Korea	Asia	1.9
South Sudan	Africa	10.5
Sri Lanka	Asia	4.0
Spain	Europe	2.5
Sudan	Africa	7.0
Suriname	South America	4.0
Sweden	Europe	2.5
Switzerland	Europe	1.9
Taiwan	Asia	10.7
Tajikistan	Asia	7.3
Tanzania	Africa	6.0
Thailand	Asia	2.1
Togo	Africa	5.0
Tonga	Oceania	1.8
Trinidad and Tobago	North America	0.2
Tunisia	Africa	2.4
Turkey	Asia	2.7
Turkmenistan	Asia	2.4
Tuvalu	Oceania	3.4
Uganda	Africa	6.2
Ukraine	Europe	1.0
United Arab Emirates	Asia	−3.9
United Kingdom	Europe	1.3
United States	North America	2.3
Uruguay	South America	1.8
Uzbekistan	Asia	7.8
Vanuatu	Oceania	3.5
Venezuela	South America	5.0
Vietnam	Asia	8.4
Yemen	Asia	−1.0
Zambia	Africa	5.6
Zimbabwe	Africa	5.0

Growth by region
Region	Rate (%)
Africa	4.2
Asia and Oceania	4.4
Australia and New Zealand	2.0
Caribbean	5.7
Central America	3.7
Central Asia and the Caucasus	3.9
East Asia	3.8
Eastern Europe	1.7
Europe	1.3
Middle East	−0.4
North Africa	4.2
North America	2.2
Pacific Islands	3.4
South America	2.3
South Asia	6.0
Southeast Asia	4.5
Sub-Saharan Africa	4.3
Western Europe	1.1
Western Hemisphere	2.3
Advanced economies	1.8
ASEAN	4.1
Emerging and Developing Asia	4.9
Emerging and Developing Europe	2.0
Emerging market and developing economies	3.9
Euro area	1.1
European Union	1.3
Latin America and the Caribbean	2.3
Major advanced economies (G7)	1.6
Middle East and Central Asia	1.9
Other advanced economies	2.6
Sub-Saharan Africa	4.3
World	3.1

== Historical list ==
Countries by yearly growth rate 2013–2025.

Real GDP growth rate (%)
Country	2013	2014	2015	2016	2017	2018	2019	2020	2021	2022	2023	2024	2025	Avg.
Afghanistan	5.683	2.697	0.988	2.164	2.647	1.189	3.912	-2.351	-14.542	-6.24	2.267			-0.14418
Albania	1.002	1.774	2.219	3.315	3.802	4.019	2.088	-3.314	8.97	4.827	3.937	3.962	3.788	3.106846
Algeria	2.597	4.086	3.162	3.884	1.524	1.44	0.933	-5.017	3.805	3.636	4.1	3.536	3.496	2.398615
Andorra	-3.548	2.504	1.434	3.71	0.346	1.589	2.016	-11.184	8.287	9.565	2.584	3.373	1.9	1.736615
Angola	4.88	4.66	0.76	-1.7	-0.14	-0.59	-0.2	-4.04	2.1	4.22	1.001	4.503	2.374	1.371385
Antigua and Barbuda	-0.601	2.198	1.422	4.12	2.713	6.712	3.172	-18.869	8.173	9.108	2.427	4.313	3.048	2.148923
Argentina	2.405	-2.513	2.731	-2.08	2.819	-2.617	-2.001	-9.9	10.442	5.27	-1.611	-1.719	5.502	0.517538
Armenia	3.412	3.607	3.254	0.195	7.518	5.225	7.631	-7.105	5.77	12.569	8.316	5.941	4.505	4.679846
Aruba	6.431	-1.587	-0.624	1.72	7.049	2.382	-2.218	-26.212	24.133	8.518	4.264	6.49	2.2	2.503538
Australia	2.219	2.575	2.34	2.694	2.38	2.791	1.936	-1.955	5.412	4.142	2.056	1.038	1.634	2.250923
Austria	-0.251	0.756	1.303	2.117	2.272	2.484	1.755	-6.318	4.795	5.278	-0.955	-1.174	-0.261	0.907769
Azerbaijan	5.843	2.768	1.08	-3.064	0.154	1.47	2.48	-4.199	5.616	4.715	1.354	4.1	3.519	1.987385
The Bahamas	-2.863	1.847	0.997	-0.962	2.8	2.63	-1.357	-21.423	15.403	10.782	2.639	2	1.8	1.099462
Bahrain	5.293	4.309	2.508	3.815	4.954	2.053	2.053	-5.911	4.35	6.18	3.878	2.776	2.753	3.000846
Bangladesh	6.014	6.061	6.553	7.114	6.59	7.319	7.882	3.448	6.939	7.1	5.775	4.223	3.76	6.059846
Barbados	-1.076	0.156	-0.846	1.792	0.128	-1.174	0.653	-15.054	-0.255	17.833	4.094	4	3	1.019308
Belarus	0.929	2.548	-3.83	-2.526	2.532	3.149	1.446	-0.673	2.273	-4.504	4.127	4	2.758	0.940692
Belgium	0.306	1.766	1.474	1.193	1.475	1.878	2.443	-4.793	6.202	4.234	1.252	0.996	0.839	1.481923
Belize	4.454	4.031	2.876	0.055	-1.813	1.111	4.268	-13.903	17.746	9.653	1.149	8.19	3.218	3.156538
Benin	7.191	6.358	1.778	3.34	5.672	6.697	6.866	3.849	7.155	6.253	6.353	6.506	6.511	5.733
Bhutan	3.334	3.705	6.155	7.514	5.855	3.505	4.648	-2.455	-3.293	4.826	5.044	4.044	7	3.837077
Bolivia	6.796	5.461	4.857	4.264	4.195	4.224	2.217	-8.738	6.111	3.606	3.082	1.3	1.14	2.962692
Bosnia and Herzegovina	2.35	1.154	4.284	3.242	3.244	3.829	2.886	-3.015	7.392	4.227	1.994	2.5	2.8	2.837462
Botswana	11.103	5.697	-4.851	7.202	4.113	4.19	3.033	-8.726	11.913	5.486	3.208	-2.99	-0.364	3.001077
Brazil	3.005	0.504	-3.546	-3.276	1.323	1.784	1.221	-3.277	4.763	3.017	3.242	3.396	2.01	1.089692
Brunei Darussalam	-2.125	-2.508	-0.405	-2.465	1.329	0.052	3.869	1.134	-1.591	-1.628	1.412	3.908	2.522	0.269538
Bulgaria	-0.543	0.949	3.398	3.027	2.746	2.549	3.789	-3.216	7.781	4.039	1.887	2.811	2.458	2.436538
Burkina Faso	5.793	4.327	3.921	5.958	6.203	6.605	5.889	2.011	6.943	1.497	2.96	4.45	4.335	4.684
Burundi	4.924	4.241	-3.9	-0.6	0.5	1.61	1.842	0.335	3.119	1.827	2.659	3.531	1.866	1.688769
Cabo Verde	0.632	0.697	0.936	4.281	4.551	3.705	6.95	-20.805	7.034	17.439	4.043	5.992	4.973	3.109846
Cambodia	7.857	8	7.207	7.906	8.075	8.776	7.937	-3.556	3.09	5.103	4.998	6.018	4.005	5.801231
Cameroon	4.987	5.779	5.6	4.479	3.541	4.022	3.422	0.539	3.039	3.737	3.217	3.562	3.611	3.810385
Canada	2.326	2.873	0.65	1.039	3.034	2.743	1.908	-5.038	5.951	4.189	1.529	1.528	1.376	1.854462
Central African Republic	-36.392	0.08	4.338	4.75	4.528	3.82	2.97	0.959	0.983	0.472	0.727	1.833	2.938	-0.614923
Chad	2.807	2.063	3.311	-4.13	-1.628	5.741	5.389	-0.409	0.294	4.11	4.028	1.515	1.72	1.908538
Chile	3.309	1.793	2.152	1.753	1.358	3.99	0.634	-6.143	11.315	2.154	0.521	2.644	2.032	2.116308
China	7.771	7.491	7.018	6.776	6.891	6.759	6.065	2.337	8.556	3.112	5.377	5.003	3.954	5.931538
Colombia	5.134	4.499	2.956	2.087	1.359	2.564	3.187	-7.186	10.801	7.328	0.712	1.744	2.415	2.892308
Comoros	4.466	2.107	1.147	3.32	3.816	3.642	1.761	-0.196	2	2.603	2.995	3.338	3.776	2.675
Democratic Republic of the Congo	9.624	7.302	6.36	0.394	3.658	4.825	4.485	1.671	1.726	9.22	8.498	6.483	4.692	5.302923
Republic of Congo	-0.712	6.717	-3.551	-4.994	-5.595	-2.304	1.124	-6.268	1.057	1.799	1.977	2.596	3.311	-0.372538
Costa Rica	2.495	3.542	3.652	4.204	4.158	2.616	2.418	-4.273	7.936	4.551	5.112	4.321	3.443	3.398077
Côte d'Ivoire	9.272	8.794	8.843	7.172	7.412	4.842	6.721	0.701	7.062	6.4	6.45	6	6.3	6.613
Croatia	-0.126	-0.555	2.322	3.461	3.281	2.903	3.1	-8.312	12.634	7.286	3.302	3.815	3.13	2.787769
Cyprus	-6.587	-1.777	3.418	6.574	5.752	6.272	5.877	-3.219	11.385	7.367	2.611	3.43	2.545	3.357538
Czech Republic	-0.042	2.245	4.959	2.581	5.174	2.83	3.566	-5.305	4.029	2.847	-0.055	1.112	1.62	1.966231
Denmark	1.393	1.278	2.101	3.076	3.056	1.859	1.713	-1.781	7.38	1.541	2.495	3.677	2.9	2.360615
Djibouti	5.001	7.193	7.309	7.123	5.458	4.774	5.545	1.202	4.407	5.167	7.372	6.513	6.008	5.620923
Dominica	-1	4.754	-2.732	2.764	-6.619	3.548	5.502	-16.605	6.892	5.584	4.712	4.55	4.22	1.197692
Dominican Republic	4.935	7.111	6.988	6.72	3.934	7.104	4.893	-7.929	14.012	5.238	2.192	4.952	4.021	4.936231
Ecuador	7.211	4.226	0.12	-0.688	5.97	1.044	0.165	-9.245	9.422	5.868	1.988	-1.959	1.727	1.988385
Egypt	3.302	2.93	4.36	4.34	4.19	5.327	5.549	3.576	3.252	6.651	3.76	2.399	3.757	4.107154
El Salvador	2.233	1.711	2.395	2.544	2.25	2.415	2.433	-7.893	11.91	2.797	3.511	2.6	2.479	2.414231
Equatorial Guinea	-4.133	0.415	-9.11	-8.816	-5.668	-6.237	-5.482	-4.791	0.86	3.224	-5.089	1.861	-4.204	-3.628462
Eritrea	-10.456	30.934	-20.621	7.391	-10.015	13.032	3.836	n/a	n/a	n/a	n/a	n/a	n/a	2.014429
Estonia	1.757	3.323	1.838	3.093	5.635	3.7	3.727	-2.884	7.154	0.06	-3.023	-0.261	0.74	1.912231
Eswatini	3.861	0.923	2.227	1.063	2.027	2.38	2.692	-1.56	10.683	0.476	5.034	3.653	5.124	2.967923
Ethiopia	9.9	10.3	10.4	8	10.21	7.703	9.037	6.057	6.265	6.362	7.171	8.051	6.612	8.159077
Fiji	4.734	5.604	4.501	2.446	5.353	3.812	-0.581	-17.04	-4.881	19.793	7.524	3.663	2.59	2.886
Finland	-0.98	-0.478	0.467	2.572	3.303	1.193	1.35	-2.491	2.676	0.763	-0.947	-0.134	0.96	0.634923
France	0.915	1.02	0.986	0.728	2.286	1.587	2.076	-7.593	6.827	2.624	1.116	1.067	0.641	1.098462
Gabon	5.517	4.435	3.879	2.091	0.473	0.909	3.848	-1.838	1.468	3.038	2.446	3.074	2.774	2.470308
The Gambia	2.873	-1.407	4.058	1.943	4.823	7.235	6.222	0.591	5.256	5.493	4.798	5.816	5.913	4.124154
Georgia	5.134	4.091	3.351	3.45	5.161	6.062	5.38	-6.291	10.644	10.96	7.832	9.429	5.977	5.475385
Germany	0.386	2.172	1.656	2.289	2.713	1.116	0.993	-4.1	3.67	1.367	-0.264	-0.232	-0.05	0.901231
Ghana	7.241	2.856	2.121	3.373	8.129	6.2	6.508	0.514	5.076	3.818	3.128	5.685	4.026	4.513462
Greece	-2.272	0.792	-0.228	-0.032	1.473	2.065	2.277	-9.196	8.654	5.744	2.332	2.272	2.03	1.223923
Grenada	2.351	7.342	6.445	3.74	4.439	4.361	0.677	-13.757	4.687	7.321	4.716	3.6	3.892	3.062615
Guatemala	3.695	4.444	4.092	2.678	3.08	3.407	4.018	-1.786	8.033	4.2	3.527	3.689	4.1	3.629
Guinea	3.946	3.697	3.826	10.821	10.3	6.358	5.617	4.704	5.583	3.972	6.242	6.073	7.086	6.017308
Guinea-Bissau	3.256	0.965	6.134	5.307	4.789	3.761	4.5	1.5	6.2	4.6	5.2	4.7	5.1	4.308615
Guyana	3.653	1.686	0.687	3.807	3.734	4.441	5.353	43.48	20.06	63.334	33.769	43.569	10.315	18.299077
Haiti	4.325	1.723	2.563	1.812	2.51	1.668	-1.685	-3.343	-1.798	-1.682	-1.864	-4.2	-1	-0.074692
Honduras	2.792	3.058	3.84	3.893	4.843	3.845	2.56	-8.965	12.565	4.144	3.583	3.6	3.3	3.312154
Hong Kong SAR	3.102	2.762	2.388	2.175	3.796	2.847	-1.672	-6.545	6.454	-3.684	3.214	2.541	1.522	1.453846
Hungary	2.032	4.334	3.66	2.439	4.124	5.606	5.077	-4.339	7.223	4.27	-0.843	0.512	1.403	2.730615
Iceland	4.552	1.687	4.437	6.304	4.195	4.889	1.861	-6.94	5.033	8.979	5.646	0.517	2.003	3.320231
India	6.386	7.41	7.996	8.256	6.795	6.454	3.871	-5.778	9.69	7.609	9.191	6.46	7.41	6.895231
Indonesia	5.557	5.007	4.876	5.033	5.07	5.174	5.019	-2.066	3.703	5.307	5.049	5.03	4.653	4.416308
Iran	-1.522	4.985	-1.425	8.815	2.759	-1.838	-3.071	3.33	4.72	3.777	5.045	3.478	0.309	2.258615
Iraq	7.628	0.738	2.537	16.172	-1.509	2.633	5.588	-12.409	1.428	7.713	0.92	0.336	-1.503	2.328615
Ireland	2.192	9.336	24.616	1.223	10.049	7.545	5.041	7.158	16.255	8.62	-5.53	1.221	2.261	6.922077
Israel	4.085	3.776	2.238	4.46	4.347	4.004	3.71	-2.022	9.388	6.263	1.827	0.872	3.25	3.553692
Italy	-1.818	-0.001	0.886	1.236	1.604	0.827	0.429	-8.868	8.931	4.821	0.715	1.1	0.6	1.116454
Jamaica	0.224	0.575	0.869	1.498	0.679	1.827	0.97	-9.92	4.601	5.222	2.605	-0.8	2.1	0.803846
Japan	2.005	0.296	1.561	0.754	1.675	0.643	-0.402	-4.169	2.697	0.935	1.486	0.084	0.554	0.624538
Jordan	2.61	3.384	2.497	1.994	2.474	1.919	1.751	-1.103	3.656	2.428	3.104	2.489	2.6	2.292538
Kazakhstan	5.9	4.3	1	0.9	3.9	4.1	4.5	-2.6	4.1	3.2	5.1	4.756	4.881	3.387462
Kenya	3.798	5.02	4.968	4.214	3.816	5.671	5.114	-0.273	7.59	4.86	5.556	4.509	4.81	4.588692
Kiribati	7.731	1.264	11.265	7.088	3.749	3.479	3.264	-1.468	8.48	4.566	2.652	5.267	3.9	4.710538
South Korea	3.291	3.215	2.92	3.172	3.433	3.176	2.314	-0.7	4.613	2.728	1.404	2.025	1.027	2.509077
North Korea												3.7	2.5	3.1
Kosovo	5.34	3.349	5.916	5.572	4.825	3.406	4.757	-5.341	10.746	4.278	4.069	4.409	4	4.255846
Kuwait	1.149	0.501	0.593	2.926	-4.712	2.743	2.264	-4.817	2.261	5.859	-3.641	-2.804	1.866	0.322154
Kyrgyz Republic	10.915	4.024	3.876	4.336	4.74	3.459	4.601	-7.149	5.507	8.968	9.013	9.04	6.823	5.242538
Lao P.D.R.(Laos)	8.026	7.612	7.27	7.023	6.892	6.248	4.652	-0.435	2.061	2.252	3.658	4.299	2.523	4.775462
Latvia	2.096	2.095	3.783	2.552	3.399	4.31	0.675	-3.469	6.943	1.807	2.854	-0.442	2.002	2.200385
Lebanon	3.811	2.466	0.453	1.563	0.913	-1.853	-6.801	-24.597	2.016	1	-0.7	-7.5	n/a	-2.43575
Lesotho	1.772	2.068	3.248	1.877	-2.734	-1.465	-2.912	-5.264	1.897	1.978	1.98	2.62	1.517	0.506308
Liberia	8.836	0.695	0.007	-1.63	2.469	1.242	-2.516	-2.967	5.011	4.811	4.587	4.819	5.334	2.361385
Libya	-17.998	-23.043	-0.843	-1.491	32.492	7.941	-11.196	-29.456	28.335	-8.252	10.156	-0.636	17.304	0.254846
Lithuania	4.079	3.769	2.845	2.614	4.705	4.832	4.723	0.048	6.361	2.516	0.428	2.726	2.787	3.264077
Luxembourg	3.171	2.623	2.268	4.978	1.317	1.611	2.749	-0.51	6.93	-1.095	-0.694	1.032	1.574	1.996462
Macao SAR	10.753	-2.048	-21.515	-0.679	9.86	6.406	-2.563	-54.336	23.535	-19.609	75.062	8.808	3.594	2.866769
Madagascar	2.3	3.339	3.132	3.993	3.933	3.194	4.411	-7.138	4.651	4.156	4.203	4.2	3.94	2.947231
Malawi	5.2	5.7	2.95	2.27	4	4.392	5.448	1.013	4.558	0.921	1.892	1.8	3.5	3.357231
Malaysia	4.694	6.007	5.007	4.45	5.813	4.843	4.413	-5.457	3.315	8.862	3.555	5.114	4.1	4.208923
Maldives	6.963	7.801	3.972	6.572	7.055	8.668	7.298	-32.909	37.508	13.826	4.726	5.134	4.469	6.237154
Mali	2.295	7.085	6.172	5.852	5.305	4.746	4.756	-1.235	3.053	3.475	4.657	4.4	4.9	4.266231
Malta	6.292	7.632	9.62	4.078	12.971	7.189	4.086	-3.359	13.301	4.269	6.797	5.968	3.9	6.364923
Marshall Islands	3.788	-1.285	1.89	2.523	3.563	5.484	10.469	-2.777	1.197	-1.096	-3.926	2.75	2.527	1.931308
Mauritania	4.151	4.275	5.376	1.261	6.271	4.773	3.146	-0.429	0.737	6.796	6.507	4.566	4.445	3.990385
Mauritius	3.36	3.827	3.691	3.862	3.938	4.007	2.891	-14.547	3.404	8.7	4.993	4.7	3	2.755846
Mexico	0.852	2.504	2.702	1.772	1.872	1.972	-0.393	-8.354	6.048	3.711	3.295	1.454	-0.26	1.321154
Micronesia	-3.661	-2.587	4.509	0.985	2.256	0.494	3.363	-1.976	3.1	-2.906	0.482	0.719	1.085	0.451
Moldova	9.044	5	-0.7	4.6	4.2	4.1	3.6	-8.3	13.9	-4.6	1.2	0.5	0.6	2.549538
Mongolia	11.649	7.885	2.41	1.49	5.637	7.745	5.602	-4.558	1.637	5.033	7.422	4.864	6.043	4.835308
Montenegro	3.549	1.784	3.39	2.949	4.716	5.078	4.063	-15.307	13.043	6.407	6.338	3.04	3.2	3.25
Morocco	4.535	2.669	4.345	0.521	5.058	3.066	2.891	-7.178	8.155	1.527	3.403	3.186	3.905	2.775615
Mozambique	6.571	7.703	7.393	4.697	2.638	3.485	2.318	-1.22	2.377	4.364	5.437	1.852	2.524	3.856846
Myanmar	7.899	8.2	5.862	6.759	6.136	6.277	6.562	-9.032	-11.995	4.017	0.997	-1.122	1.904	2.497231
Namibia	5.615	6.093	4.264	0.034	-1.027	1.06	-0.839	-8.101	3.604	5.399	4.443	3.712	3.783	2.156923
Nauru	3.648	16.423	2.698	4.363	-6.011	-1.219	8.487	1.982	7.207	2.952	0.646	1.76	1.954	3.453077
Nepal	3.525	6.011	3.976	0.433	8.977	7.622	6.657	-2.37	4.838	5.631	1.953	3.101	4.047	4.184692
Netherlands	-0.032	1.612	2.121	2.425	2.783	2.26	2.3	-3.877	6.278	5.007	0.073	0.98	1.413	1.795615
New Zealand	2.171	3.807	3.606	3.969	3.341	3.477	3.021	-1.311	5.69	2.856	1.811	-0.483	1.372	2.563615
Nicaragua	4.927	4.785	4.792	4.563	4.631	-3.363	-2.897	-2.237	10.454	3.55	4.428	3.588	3.2	3.109308
Niger	5.311	6.644	4.393	5.741	5.001	7.007	6.143	3.55	1.361	11.862	2.375	10.3	6.587	5.867308
Nigeria	5.394	6.31	2.653	-1.617	0.806	1.923	2.208	-1.794	3.647	3.252	2.86	3.426	3.039	2.469769
North Macedonia	2.925	3.629	3.856	2.848	1.082	2.881	3.91	-4.688	4.511	2.758	2.073	2.756	3.2	2.441615
Norway	1.016	2.048	1.857	1.165	2.464	0.829	1.124	-1.278	3.909	3.246	0.072	2.1	2.137	1.591462
Oman	5.227	1.292	5.017	5.046	0.304	1.288	-1.129	-3.38	2.582	7.986	1.187	1.674	2.33	2.263385
Pakistan	3.856	3.556	3.812	4.072	4.609	6.096	3.12	-0.943	5.77	6.18	-0.218	2.497	2.649	3.465846
Palau	-1.392	4.212	8.57	1.666	-3.421	-0.418	0.301	-5.996	-11.925	-0.782	1.367	7.139	5.741	0.389385
Panama	6.903	5.067	5.733	4.953	5.591	3.685	3.282	-17.668	15.836	10.809	7.595	2.9	4	4.514308
Papua New Guinea	3.825	13.544	6.576	5.492	3.535	-0.279	4.48	-3.167	-0.511	5.707	3.815	3.744	4.57	3.948538
Paraguay	8.293	5.301	2.957	4.268	4.81	3.204	-0.402	-0.82	4.017	0.176	4.999	4	3.8	3.431
Peru	5.853	2.382	3.252	3.953	2.519	3.969	2.24	-10.869	13.361	2.809	-0.403	3.333	2.84	2.710692
Philippines	6.751	6.348	6.348	7.149	6.931	6.341	6.119	-9.518	5.715	7.581	5.519	5.692	5.476	5.111692
Poland	0.684	3.92	4.432	3.031	5.152	6.246	4.581	-2.036	6.927	5.255	0.139	2.852	3.237	3.416923
Portugal	-0.984	0.741	1.59	2.004	3.315	2.946	2.746	-8.205	5.559	6.986	2.613	1.928	1.96	1.784538
Puerto Rico	-0.307	-1.19	-1.049	-1.264	-2.885	-4.362	1.676	-4.181	0.386	3.568	0.564	1	-0.8	-0.680308
Qatar	5.556	5.334	4.753	3.064	-1.498	1.235	0.688	-3.558	1.627	4.185	1.369	2.366	2.41	2.117769
Romania	0.279	4.116	3.157	2.86	8.195	6.121	3.923	-3.674	5.546	3.965	2.404	0.856	1.597	3.026538
Russia	1.755	0.736	-1.973	0.194	1.827	2.806	2.198	-2.654	5.866	-1.436	4.083	4.1	1.456	1.458308
Rwanda	4.73	6.154	8.867	5.969	3.931	8.526	9.437	-3.371	10.861	8.152	8.255	8.891	7.109	6.731615
Samoa	0.107	0.66	3.85	7.984	1.406	-0.61	4.453	-3.099	-7.027	-5.369	9.215	9.416	5.381	2.028231
San Marino	-0.814	-0.66	2.717	2.313	0.267	1.482	2.023	-6.829	14.384	7.898	0.4	0.696	1	1.913615
São Tomé and Príncipe	5.12	4.906	1.54	5.177	4.113	4.378	2	2.6	1.9	0.2	0.4	0.9	3.125	2.796846
Saudi Arabia	2.535	3.811	4.509	1.884	0.911	3.199	1.098	-3.582	5.075	7.486	-0.755	1.306	2.989	2.343538
Senegal	2.412	6.224	6.367	6.356	7.407	6.209	4.614	1.342	6.54	3.998	4.3	6.679	8.445	5.453308
Serbia	0.452	-1.804	1.296	2.975	2.363	4.649	4.75	-0.95	7.949	2.631	3.847	3.878	3.463	2.730692
Seychelles	6.403	4.717	8.913	12.118	6.957	4.937	5.513	-11.741	0.554	12.711	2.259	3	3.526	4.605154
Sierra Leone	9.428	-0.622	-3.083	4.675	3.941	3.405	5.503	-1.253	5.897	5.314	5.71	3.681	4.659	3.635
Singapore	4.818	3.936	2.977	3.748	4.477	3.452	1.308	-3.815	9.757	4.108	1.821	4.388	2.012	3.306692
Slovak Republic	0.703	2.708	5.177	1.948	2.875	4.062	2.276	-2.586	5.727	0.45	1.378	2.026	1.252	2.153538
Slovenia	-0.824	2.763	2.393	3.035	5.174	4.379	3.505	-4.085	8.39	2.699	2.113	1.591	1.8	2.533308
Solomon Islands	5.237	1.186	1.678	5.556	3.077	2.745	1.749	-3.383	2.564	2.403	2.66	2.535	2.715	2.363231
Somalia	5.655	2.747	4.589	-1.275	9.5	1.4	2.824	-2.752	3.458	2.727	4.216	4	4	3.160692
South Africa	2.485	1.414	1.322	0.665	1.158	1.557	0.26	-6.169	4.955	1.911	0.698	0.58	0.979	0.908846
South Sudan	27.272	1.556	-0.231	-13.299	-5.794	-2.149	0.856	-6.494	5.329	-5.186	2.458	-27.607	-4.314	-2.123308
Spain	-1.428	1.521	4.062	2.915	2.894	2.394	1.961	-10.941	6.685	6.182	2.673	3.151	2.501	1.89
Sri Lanka	4.052	6.378	4.206	5.054	6.461	2.31	-0.22	-4.625	4.207	-7.349	-2.33	5.009	n/a	1.929417
St. Kitts and Nevis	5.706	7.587	0.717	3.91	0.017	2.053	4.05	-14.561	-1.676	10.523	4.3	1.536	1.964	2.009692
St. Lucia	-2.222	1.302	-0.24	3.806	3.38	2.887	-0.7	-24.362	11.6	20.387	2.21	3.793	3.035	1.913538
St. Vincent and the Grenadines	2.968	1.042	2.769	4.034	1.499	3.185	0.719	-4.722	2.197	5.043	5.8	4.8	4.7	2.618
Sudan	1.955	4.661	4.906	4.7	0.768	-2.29	-2.5	-3.63	0.5	-2.5	-20.755	-23.363	-0.379	-2.917462
Suriname	2.931	0.254	-3.414	-4.912	1.566	4.948	1.168	-15.975	-2.435	2.406	2.54	3.049	3.202	-0.359385
Sweden	1.138	2.296	4.41	2.35	1.825	1.903	2.55	-2.005	5.938	1.459	-0.114	0.974	1.858	1.890923
Switzerland	1.849	2.287	1.574	2.1	1.433	2.86	1.156	-2.29	5.573	3.126	0.743	1.269	0.876	1.735077
Taiwan	2.483	4.719	1.465	2.165	3.662	2.905	3.055	3.42	6.72	2.684	1.122	4.299	2.854	3.196385
Tajikistan	7.4	6.7	6	6.9	7.1	7.6	7.4	4.39	9.4	8	8.25	8.357	6.694	7.245462
Tanzania	6.782	6.732	6.161	6.867	6.727	7.028	6.915	4.535	4.838	4.665	5.064	5.436	6.02	5.982308
Thailand	2.687	0.984	3.134	3.435	4.178	4.223	2.115	-6.05	1.543	2.627	2.006	2.53	1.8	1.939385
Timor-Leste	3.068	4.527	2.48	3.01	-3.182	-0.467	2.667	-8.492	2.973	3.953	2.375	4.1	3.4	1.570154
Togo	5.824	5.633	5.468	5.734	4.008	4.795	4.923	1.976	5.991	5.811	5.6	5.3	5.3	5.104846
Tonga	-1.122	1.991	1.114	6.599	3.202	0.688	-0.208	1.783	0.363	-2.31	2.084	2.073	2.725	1.460154
Trinidad and Tobago	3.345	3.695	-0.565	-7.403	-4.819	-0.986	0.472	-8.903	-0.912	1.082	1.427	1.427	2.367	-0.751769
Tunisia	2.43	3.09	0.968	1.117	2.252	2.607	1.55	-8.975	4.736	2.674	0.039	1.357	1.43	1.175
Turkey	8.486	4.94	6.084	3.323	7.502	3.013	0.819	1.86	11.439	5.533	5.111	3.184	2.706	4.923077
Turkmenistan	-1.754	3.605	2.159	-0.466	2.141	1.74	-3.666	-2.116	-0.338	5.315	1.974	2.264	2.255	1.008692
Tuvalu	3.805	1.667	9.379	4.865	3.295	1.654	13.389	-3.684	-0.553	-2.365	7.925	3.316	2.803	3.499692
Uganda	3.938	5.745	8.005	0.167	6.795	5.568	7.626	-1.15	5.515	6.186	4.905	6.293	6.119	5.054769
Ukraine	-0.027	-6.553	-9.773	2.441	2.36	3.488	3.2	-3.753	3.446	-28.759	5.324	3.511	2	-1.776538
United Arab Emirates	5.056	4.166	6.787	5.561	0.735	1.314	1.108	-4.957	4.355	7.51	3.619	3.762	3.991	3.308231
United Kingdom	1.8	3.195	2.223	1.922	2.657	1.405	1.624	-10.297	8.576	4.839	0.397	1.101	1.077	1.578385
United States	2.118	2.524	2.946	1.82	2.458	2.967	2.584	-2.163	6.055	2.512	2.887	2.796	1.826	2.41
Uruguay	4.638	3.239	0.371	1.69	1.741	0.165	0.928	-7.357	5.844	4.486	0.742	3.108	2.844	1.726077
Uzbekistan	7.297	6.874	7.219	5.932	4.395	5.559	6.78	1.563	8.035	6.001	6.309	6.547	5.899	6.031538
Vanuatu	0.467	2.575	3.966	3.472	4.414	2.9	3.238	-4.991	-1.552	5.186	2.094	0.852	1.374	1.845769
Venezuela	1.343	-3.894	-6.221	-17.04	-15.671	-19.655	-27.658	-29.999	0.955	8.001	4.002	5.3	-4	-8.041308
Vietnam	5.554	6.422	6.987	6.69	6.94	7.465	7.359	2.865	2.554	8.538	5.065	7.091	5.152	6.052462
West Bank and Gaza	4.699	-0.158	3.721	8.865	1.419	1.227	1.363	-11.318	7.012	4.083	-4.556	n/a	n/a	1.487
Yemen	4.824	-0.189	-27.995	-9.375	-5.072	0.752	2.1	-8.5	-1	1.5	-2	-1.5	-1.5	-3.688846
Zambia	5.057	4.698	2.92	3.777	3.504	4.127	1.4	-2.8	6.2	5.211	5.368	4.043	6.2	3.823462
Zimbabwe	2.068	2.401	1.845	0.754	5.203	5.01	-6.332	-7.817	8.468	6.139	5.337	2.027	6.022	2.394231

== See also ==
- Economic growth
- List of European countries by GDP growth
- World economy
- Gross domestic product
