= Economy of Oceania =

Statistics
- Population: estimated 38 million (2014)
- GDP: PPP: US$2.349 trillion (2025)
- GDP per capita: PPP: $60,000
- During 2003 unless otherwise stated. Most numbers are from the UNDP from 2002, some numbers exclude certain countries for lack of information. All values, unless otherwise stated, are in US dollars.

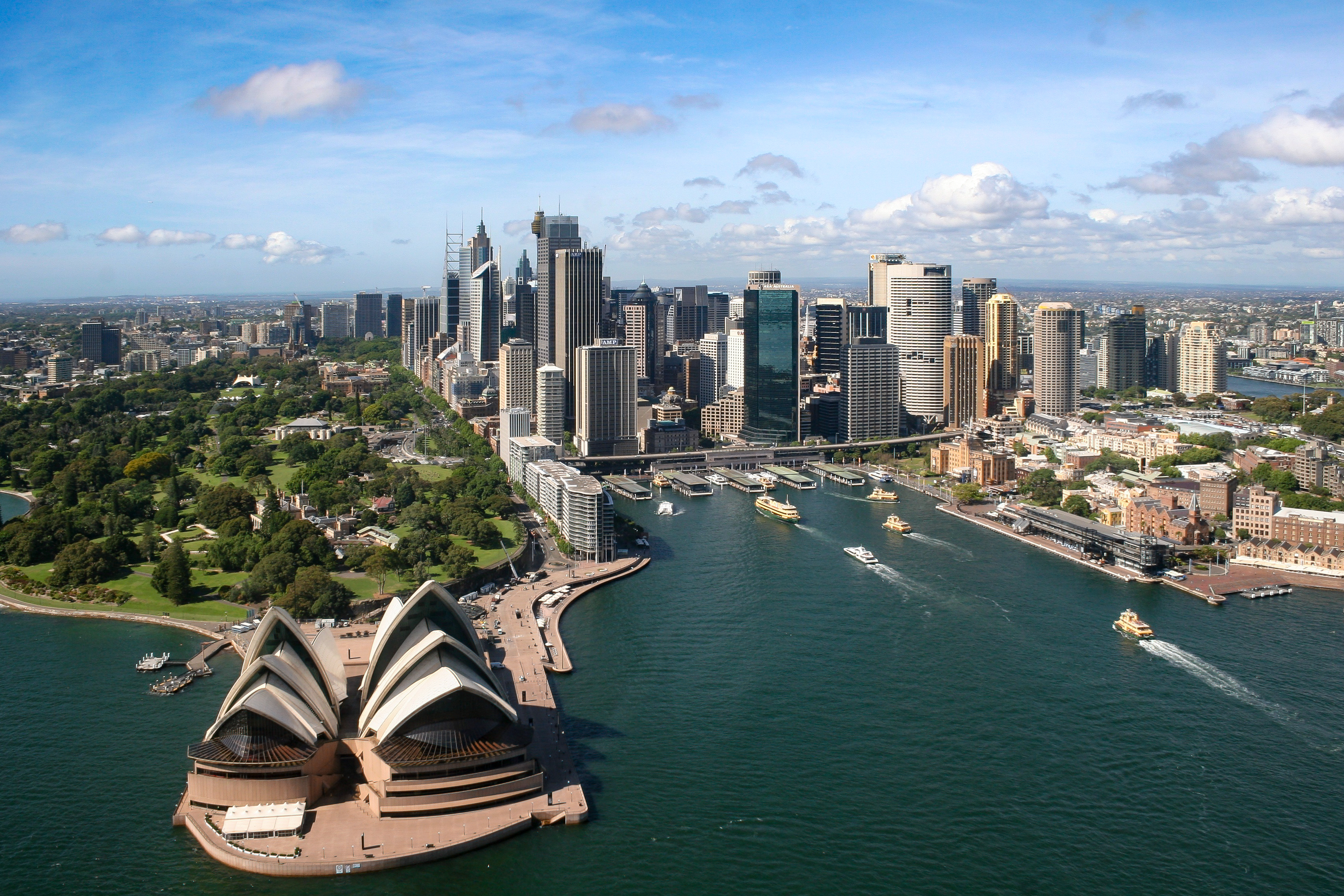
The skyline of the Sydney central business district in Australia. Sydney is the most populous city in Oceania and is one of Oceania's only two Alpha world cities.

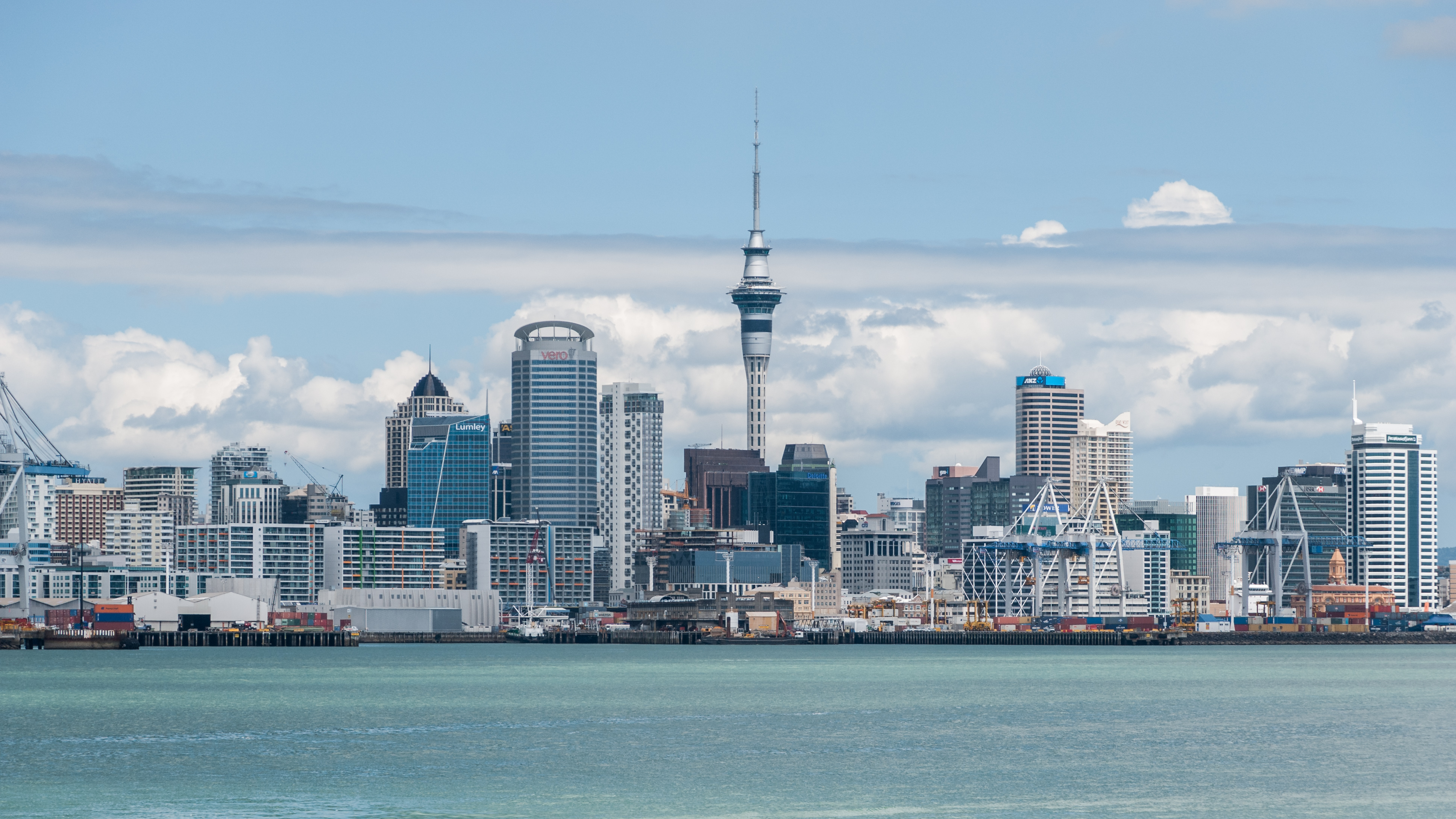
The skyline of the Auckland Central Business District in New Zealand. Auckland is the fifth populous city in Oceania and most populous city in New Zealand.

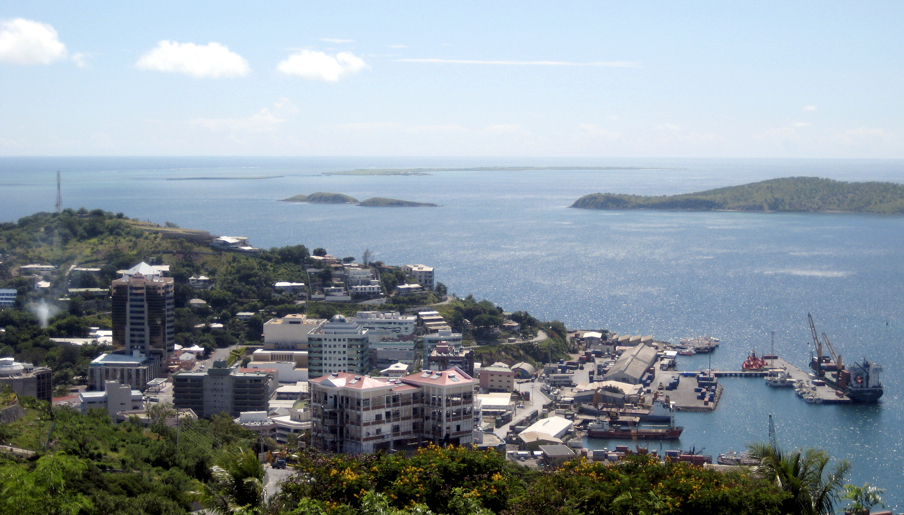
The downtown area of Port Moresby, the capital of Papua New Guinea. Port Moresby is the most populous Oceanian city outside of Australia and New Zealand.

The economy of Oceania comprises more than 14 separate countries and their associated economies. In 2025, Oceania’s GDP was approximately US$2.3 trillion, dominated by Australia and New Zealand.

On a total scale, Oceania has approximately 34,700,201 inhabitants who are spread among 30,000 islands in the South Pacific bordered between Asia and the Americas. This region has a diverse mix of economies from the highly developed and globally competitive financial markets of Australia and New Zealand to the much less developed economies that belong to many of its island neighbours.

== Trade blocs ==
The smallest Pacific nations rely on trade with Australia, New Zealand and the United States for exporting goods and for accessing other products.

Australia and New Zealand's trading arrangements are known as Closer Economic Relations. Australia and New Zealand, along with other countries, are members of Asia-Pacific Economic Cooperation (APEC) and the East Asia Summit (EAS), which may become trade blocs in the future particularly EAS.

== Currency ==
The below table summarizes the official currencies of Oceania. Several territories are dollarized or use a currency with a fixed exchange rate.

Country/territory	Currency	Central bank	Notes
American Samoa	US Dollar	Federal Reserve	US territory
Australia	Australian Dollar	Reserve Bank of Australia	
Cook Islands	New Zealand Dollar	Reserve Bank of New Zealand	Dollarized
Easter Island	Chilean Peso	Central Bank of Chile	Chilean territory
Fiji	Fiji Dollar	Reserve Bank of Fiji	
French Polynesia	Pacific Franc	Institut d'émission d'Outre-Mer	Pegged to Euro
Guam	US Dollar	Federal Reserve	US territory
Hawaii	US Dollar	Federal Reserve	US state
Kiribati	Australian Dollar	Reserve Bank of Australia	Dollarized
Marshall Islands	US Dollar	Federal Reserve	Dollarized
FS Micronesia	US Dollar	Federal Reserve	Dollarized
Nauru	Australian Dollar	Reserve Bank of Australia	Dollarized
New Caledonia	Pacific Franc	Institut d'émission d'Outre-Mer	Pegged to Euro
New Zealand	New Zealand Dollar	Reserve Bank of New Zealand	
Niue	New Zealand Dollar	Reserve Bank of New Zealand	Dollarized
Norfolk Island	Australian Dollar	Reserve Bank of Australia	Australian territory
Northern Mariana Islands	US Dollar	Federal Reserve	US territory
Palau	US Dollar	Federal Reserve	Dollarized
Papua New Guinea	Kina	Bank of Papua New Guinea	
Pitcairn Islands	New Zealand Dollar	Reserve Bank of New Zealand	Dollarized
Samoa	Tala	Central Bank of Samoa	
Solomon Islands	Solomon Islands dollar	Central Bank of Solomon Islands	
Tokelau	New Zealand Dollar	Reserve Bank of New Zealand	Dollarized
Tonga	Pa'anga	National Reserve Bank of Tonga	Pegged to currency basket
Tuvalu	Australian Dollar	Reserve Bank of Australia	Dollarized
Vanuatu	Vatu	Reserve Bank of Vanuatu	
Wallis and Futuna	Pacific Franc	Institut d'émission d'Outre-Mer	Pegged to Euro

== Economic sectors ==
=== Service industry ===
The overwhelming majority of people living in the Pacific islands work in the service industry which includes tourism, education and financial services. Oceania's largest export markets include Japan, China, the United States and South Korea. The majority of people living in Australia, and to a lesser extent, New Zealand work in mining, electrical and manufacturing sectors also.

=== Manufacturing ===
The manufacturing of clothing is a major industry in some parts of the Pacific, especially Fiji, although this is generally decreasing.

Australia boasts the largest amount of manufacturing in the region, producing cars, electrical equipment, machinery and clothes.

=== Tourism ===
Tourism has become a large source of income for many in the Pacific; tourists come from Australia, New Zealand, Japan, the United Kingdom and the United States. Fiji currently draws almost half a million tourists each year; more than a quarter from Australia. This contributes $1 billion or more since 1995 to Fiji's economy but the government of Fiji underestimate these figures due in part to an invisible economy inside the tourism industry.

=== Agriculture and fishing ===
Agriculture and natural resources constitutes only 5% to 10% of Oceania's total jobs, but contributes substantially to export performance. The most populous two nations, Australia and New Zealand, are also the most developed and have majority service industries. This dilutes the data from the less developed Pacific Island nations who have major agricultural economies. Most of the Pacific countries (excluding Australia and New Zealand) the primary industry is agriculture. Many nations are still quintessentially agricultural; for example, 80% of the population of Vanuatu and 70% of the population of Fiji works in agriculture. The main produce from the pacific is copra or coconut, but timber, beef, palm oil, cocoa, sugar and ginger are also commonly grown across the tropics of the Pacific. Fishing provides a major industry for many of the smaller nations in the Pacific, although many fishing areas are exploited by other larger countries, namely Japan. Natural Resources, such as lead, zinc, nickel and gold, are mined in Australia and the Solomon Islands. Oceania's largest export markets include Japan, China, the United States, India, South Korea and the European Union.

=== International aid and charity ===
==== Oceanian donor nations ====
Oceania's most populous nations, Australia and New Zealand, are both highly developed nations and are large international aid donors. These two wealthy nations share the region with less developed nations which still rely on foreign aid for development. In the 2007/08 financial year Australia provided $3.155 billion worth of official development assistance, of which $2.731 billion will be managed by AusAID. Every week, each Australian puts in around $2.40 to pay for Australia's aid program, amounting to around 1% of the Australian Federal Government expenditure compared to the 42% spent on social security and welfare.

==== Oceanian recipient states ====
In the Solomon Islands 50% of government spending is paid for by international donors; namely Australia, New Zealand, the European Union, Japan and the Republic of China (Taiwan).

== Global trade relations ==
This region consists of many trading relations because of the small amount of land and limited resources they have. Many have trading economies and are transitioning to a developed economy and infrastructure.

== See also ==
- List of Oceanian countries by GDP (nominal)
