= Papali'i =

Papali'i or Papalii is both a given name and a surname. Notable people with the name include:

== Given name ==
- Papalii Sia Figiel (1967–2026), Samoan novelist, poet and painter
- Papaliʻi Laupepa (1940–1985), Western Samoan chief and politician
- Papaliʻi Liʻo Taeu Masipau (born c. 1954), Samoan politician
- Papaliʻi Poumau (died 1970s), Western Samoan politician

== Surname ==
- Abraham Papali'i (born 1993), New Zealand rugby league and union footballer
- Christine Papali'i (born 1962), New Zealand rugby union player
- Dalton Papali'i (born 1997), New Zealand rugby union player
- Isaiah Papali'i (born 1998), New Zealand & Samoa international rugby league footballer
- Joash Papali'i (born 2004), Australian rugby league footballer
- Josh Papali'i (born 1992), Australia & Samoa international rugby league footballer
- Lorina Papali'i (born 1977), New Zealand rugby league and rugby union footballer
- Tavarna Papalii (born 2005), Samoa international rugby league footballer

== See also ==
- Leasi Papali'i Tommy Scanlan, Samoan diplomat
