= List of European countries by GDP growth =

This is a list of estimates of the real gross domestic product growth rate (not rebased GDP) in European countries for the latest years recorded in the IMF. The list includes all members of the Council of Europe and Belarus.

== List ==
Real GDP Growth Rates in Europe

Rank	Country	GDP growth rate (%)	Year
1	Malta	▲3.70	2026 est.
2	Albania	▲3.41	2026 est.
3	Poland	▲3.32	2026 est.
4	North Macedonia	▲3.10	2026 est.
5	Lithuania	▲2.91	2026 est.
6	Serbia	▲2.83	2026 est.
7	Montenegro	▲2.80	2026 est.
8	Bulgaria	▲2.77	2026 est.
9	Croatia	▲2.64	2026 est.
10	Ireland	▲2.52	2026 est.
11	Czechia	▲2.23	2026 est.
12	Latvia	▲2.22	2026 est.
13	Bosnia and Herzegovina	▲2.20	2026 est.
14	Andorra	▲2.10	2026 est.
15	Spain	▲2.09	2026 est.
16	Denmark	▲2.00	2026 est.
17	Ukraine	▲2.00	2026 est.
18	Slovenia	▲2.00	2026 est.
19	Sweden	▲1.96	2026 est.
20	Portugal	▲1.93	2026 est.
21	Iceland	▲1.90	2026 est.
22	Moldova	▲1.90	2026 est.
23	Greece	▲1.80	2026 est.
24	Hungary	▲1.66	2026 est.
25	Luxembourg	▲1.59	2026 est.
26	Norway	▲1.48	2026 est.
27	Estonia	▲1.43	2026 est.
28	Switzerland	▲1.34	2026 est.
29	San Marino	▲1.30	2026 est.
30	Netherlands	▲1.23	2026 est.
31	Belarus	▲1.22	2026 est.
32	Russian Federation	▲1.09	2026 est.
33	Finland	▲1.05	2026 est.
34	France	▲0.86	2026 est.
35	United Kingdom	▲0.80	2026 est.
36	Germany	▲0.79	2026 est.
37	Romania	▲0.69	2026 est.
38	Austria	▲0.68	2026 est.
39	Belgium	▲0.66	2026 est.
40	Slovakia	▲0.60	2026 est.
41	Italy	▲0.52	2026 est.
42	Liechtenstein	▼0.40	2026 est.

== See also ==
- Economic growth
- GDP
