= Innovia Films =

UK manufacturer of polypropylene films

- Premises in Wigton
- Type: Limited company
- Industry: Packaging & Labels
- Headquarters: Wigton, Cumbria, England
- Area served: > 80 countries
- Products: Speciality films
- Number of employees: > 1400 worldwide
- Parent: CCL Industries Inc
- Website: innoviafilms.com

Innovia Films, a division of CCL Industries, is an international manufacturer and supplier of biaxially-oriented polypropylene films for speciality packaging, labelling, tobacco overwrap and industrial products. It was once known as UCB Films.

The UK plant is based in Wigton, Cumbria, the company is exclusively focused on speciality films, including biaxially oriented polypropylene, used in many wrapping and labelling applications and for banknote production in Canada, Australia, Britain and other countries. Total annual film capacity worldwide currently stands at more than 218,000 tonnes.

== History ==
In 1926, Société Industrielle de la Cellophane (SIDAC) was founded with a factory in Ghent, Belgium. Six years later SIDAC formed a company in the UK to distribute its Ghent-produced film. This later became British Sidac Ltd, which opened its first production plant at St Helens in 1934. Also in 1934, British New Wrap Co Ltd was formed in Wigton, and production of cellulose film began at the site which had previously been set up to produce Rayon. In 1935, Courtaulds and La Cellophane SA joined forces to produce and sell Cellophane in the UK. This new venture, British Cellophane Ltd (BCL) began production at a major new plant in Bridgwater, Somerset in 1937. In 1942, La Cellophane Espanola was founded in Burgos, Spain

In 1961 ICI developed Biaxially Oriented Polypropylene (BOPP), which, because of its clarity, gloss, sparkle, crispness and grease resistance, resembled cellulose film rather than polyethylene to which it is chemically related. In 1963 British Rayophane and British Sidac merged under the British Sidac name and, four years later, entered into a joint venture with ICI to manufacture BOPP on the Wigton site. A new £3m factory was built to be operated by this new company called Sidex Ltd. In 1973 British Sidac became a wholly owned subsidiary of the UCB Group of Belgium. In 1982, the British Sidac plant at St Helens was closed and in 1987, UCB Films acquired La Cellophane Espanola.

In 1987 the BOPP production partnership with ICI ended, and UCB Films assumed full ownership of Sidex Ltd. There followed a period of investment in the Wigton plant, raising capacity from 10,000 to 35,000 tonnes pa. In the 1990s, around €135m was invested in the plant, including a second £10m coater plant in 1997, while a third was added in 2001 with a new bubble line to bring capacity to 15,000 tonnes per annum. In 1996, UCB Films acquired British Cellophane Ltd and the trade name Cellophane. In 1997, UCB Films bought the ICI Propafilm business in Ghent, and it also bought the Tecumseh, Kansas plant from US cellulose film producer Flexel Inc, to become one of the world's largest producers of cellulose film. In 2000 it bought the Mexican company Cydsa, closing its plant in Burgos.

In 1999 a new BOPP manufacturing plant was opened in Melbourne, Australia.

Mr Tony Blair MP, Rt. Hon. Prime Minister opened a new purpose built Research & Development Centre in Wigton in 2002.

In February 2013, the company bought the 50% share of Securency International it did not already own from the Reserve Bank of Australia using cash reserves. Securency and Note Printing Australia had faced a scandal involving bribery of officials to win currency printing contracts.

== Innovia Films ==
In October 2004, a UK consortium led by Dennis Matthewman and financed by private equity company Candover Investments, bought UCB's polypropylene and cellulose films business. As the market for cellulose films was contracting due to substitution by oil based polymers, Innovia decided to close one of its plants to reduce costs and improve efficiency. As a consequence, the Bridgwater factory closed in the summer of 2005.

Innovia Films completed the sale of its cellulose films business on 30 June 2016 to Futamura Chemical Co. Ltd, a Japanese company.

In December 2016, the Canadian firm CCL Industries bought the company for £680 million. Their shrinkfilms production site based in Germany was rebranded Innovia Shrinkfilms.

CCL Industries Inc acquired the USA operations of Treofan Americas in July 2018. They were rebranded Innovia Films. The acquisition expanded the company's footprint by providing a manufacturing facility in Mexico. Their manufacturing process is the Tenter system.

In 2020 CCL Industries acquired Flexpol S.p.a. a BOPP films producer in Plock, Poland who have both Tenter and Cast polypropylene production. They were also rebranded Innovia Films.

=== Production sites ===
The current production sites are located in:

- (United Kingdom) UK – Wigton,
- Australia – Melbourne
- Belgium – Merelbeke
- Germany – Schkopau
- Poland - Plock
- Mexico – Zacapu

== See also ==
- Guardian (polymer)
