= Thorofare, New Jersey =

Populated place in Gloucester County, New Jersey, US

- Unincorporated community
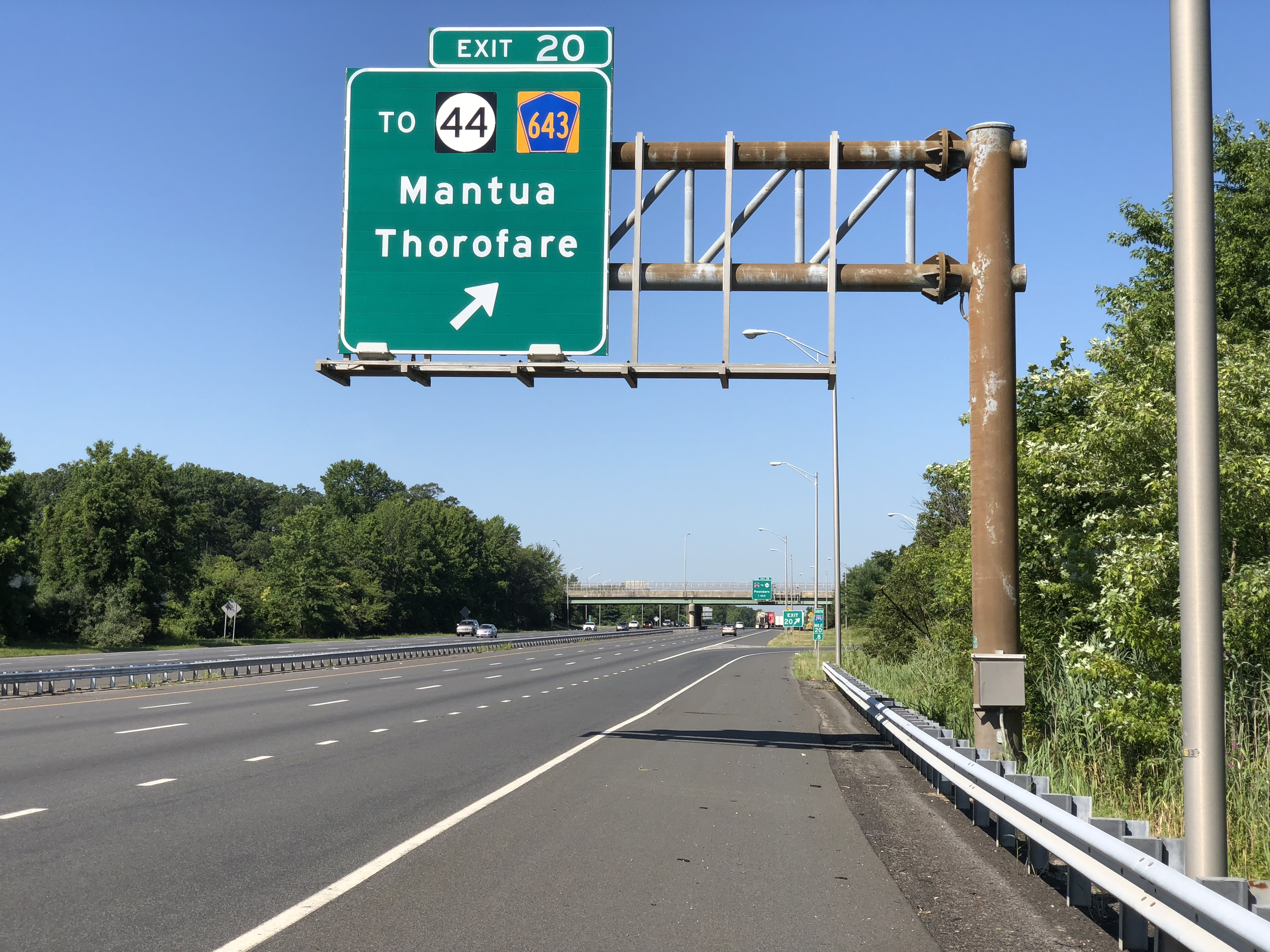
- Signage indicating exit to Thorofare from southbound Interstate Highway 295

- Location in Gloucester County Location in New Jersey Location in the United States
- Coordinates: 39°50′32″N 75°11′47″W
- Country: United States
- State: New Jersey
- County: Gloucester
- Township: West Deptford

Area
  - Total: 4.11 sq mi (10.64 km^{2})
  - Land: 3.35 sq mi (8.68 km^{2})
  - Water: 0.75 sq mi (1.95 km^{2})
- Elevation: 20 ft (6 m)

Population (2020)
  - Total: 2,806
  - Density: 837.6/sq mi (323.4/km^{2})
- Time zone: UTC−05:00 (Eastern (EST))
  - Summer (DST): UTC−04:00
- ZIP Code: 08086
- FIPS code: 34-28380
- GNIS feature ID: 0881166

Thorofare is an unincorporated community and census-designated place (CDP) located within West Deptford Township in northwestern Gloucester County, situated in the South Jersey region of the U.S. state of New Jersey. The area is served as United States Postal Service ZIP Code 08086. As of the 2020 United States census, the CDP's population was 2,806. As of the 2000 census, the population of a different geographic entity containing Thorofare, namely ZIP Code Tabulation Area 08086, was 5,424.

Checkpoint Systems is headquartered in Thorofare.

== Demographics ==
Historical population
Census	Pop.	Note	%±
2020	2,806		—

Thorofare first appeared as a census designated place in the 2020 U.S. census.

=== 2020 census ===
As of the 2020 census, Thorofare had a population of 2,806. The median age was 56.5 years. 14.4% of residents were under the age of 18 and 34.9% were 65 years of age or older. For every 100 females, there were 93.5 males, and for every 100 females age 18 and over, there were 91.9 males age 18 and over.

100.0% of residents lived in urban areas, while 0.0% lived in rural areas.

There were 1,324 households, of which 18.4% had children under the age of 18 living in them. Of all households, 43.5% were married-couple households, 18.7% were households with a male householder and no spouse or partner present, and 31.3% were households with a female householder and no spouse or partner present. About 34.0% of all households were made up of individuals, and 21.0% had someone living alone who was 65 years of age or older.

There were 1,375 housing units, of which 3.7% were vacant. The homeowner vacancy rate was 0.6% and the rental vacancy rate was 5.1%.

Thorofare CDP, New Jersey – Racial and ethnic composition Note: the US Census treats Hispanic/Latino as an ethnic category. This table excludes Latinos from the racial categories and assigns them to a separate category. Hispanics/Latinos may be of any race.
Race / Ethnicity (NH = Non-Hispanic)	Pop 2020	2020
White alone (NH)	2,264	80.68%
Black or African American alone (NH)	238	8.48%
Native American or Alaska Native alone (NH)	4	0.14%
Asian alone (NH)	52	1.85%
Native Hawaiian or Pacific Islander alone (NH)	0	0.00%
Other race alone (NH)	7	0.25%
Mixed race or Multiracial (NH)	100	3.56%
Hispanic or Latino (any race)	141	5.02%
Total	2,806	100.00%
