= Checkpoint Systems =

American provider for loss prevention and merchandise visibility

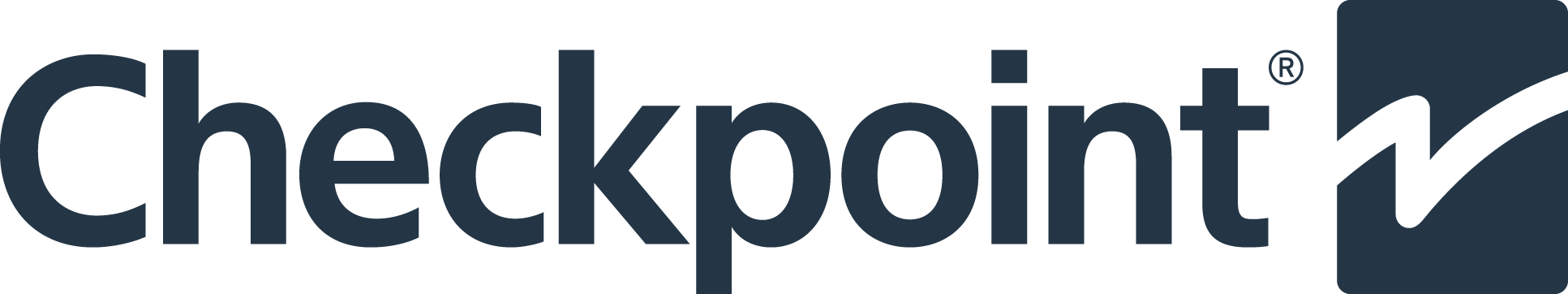
- Type: Public
- Industry: Retail; Shrink management; Apparel Labeling Solutions; RFID
- Headquarters: Thorofare, New Jersey, U.S.
- Area served: Worldwide
- Key people: Ben Lilienthal (President)
- Brands: Alpha High Theft Solutions; Apparel Labeling Solutions
- Number of employees: 5000+
- Subsidiaries: Alpha High Theft Solutions; Oat Systems
- Website: www.checkpointsystems.com

Checkpoint Systems is an American company that specializes in loss prevention and merchandise visibility for retail companies. It manufactures a range of products and solutions that enable retailers to check inventory, speed up the replenishment cycle, prevent out-of-stocks, and reduce theft. Its portfolio includes Electronic Article Surveillance (EAS) radio frequency systems, RFID hardware and software, source tagging, secure product display solutions, and a comprehensive set of RFID and barcode labeling capabilities.

Checkpoint is a vertically integrated RFID provider, offering RFID solutions such as inlay manufacturing, label conversion, printing, encoding, and data analytics. The company supports retailers and brands with real-time item-level visibility and traceability throughout the supply chain.

As of 2025, Checkpoint operates two large-scale RFID manufacturing facilities — one in China and one in Mexico City — with a combined production capacity of approximately 7.5 billion RFID inlays per year. The newly opened 10,000 m² factory in Mexico features state-of-the-art converting, bonding, printing, and personalization equipment, and is certified to SMETA and FSC CoC standards. The company is also known for pioneering innovations in RFID, including the development of microwave-safe and reusable RFID inlays for the circular economy.

Checkpoint Systems is currently a division of CCL Industries, which acquired the company in 2016 for approximately $443 million.

Checkpoint provides anti-theft protection, secure product display, electronic article surveillance, and labeling systems — offering both premium Checkpoint-branded EAS/RFID solutions and compatible options for Sensormatic systems.

== History ==
Checkpoint was started in the United States in 1969 as a subsidiary of Logistics Industries.

=== 1977–1998 ===
On June 30, 1977, Checkpoint was spun off from its parent company and began trading on NASDAQ under the symbol CHECK.

Within the next twenty years, Checkpoint Systems implemented radio frequency EAS (RF-EAS) across different stores, and in October 1993, the company's common stock began trading on the New York Stock Exchange under the symbol CKP.

In the mid-1990s, after purchasing two European systems manufacturers, Checkpoint established direct access to the European market. Its security systems were marketed to retail customers, including drug store chains, hypermarkets, supermarkets, mass merchandisers, discount stores and electronics retailers, as well as libraries in the United States.

=== 1999–2006 ===
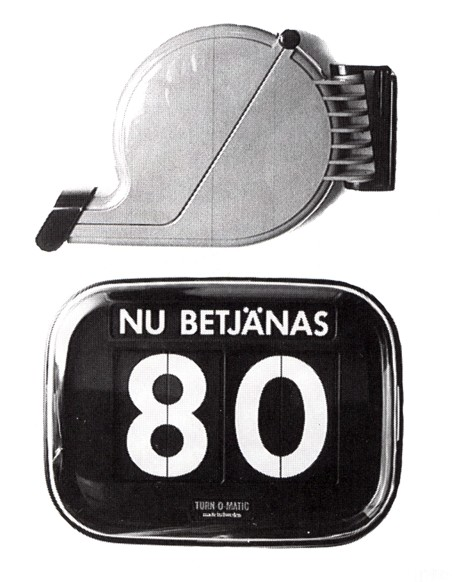
M80 Könummersystem 'queue number system', originally designed by A&E Design for the Swedish company AB Turn-O-Matic (1974)

In 1999, Checkpoint Systems broadened its product offering with the purchase of METO, a German provider of handheld labeling systems used by food and discount retailers to brand and price mark merchandise, as well as the Turn-O-Matic D 80 queue number system that "can be found in most supermarkets." The newly acquired company doubled Checkpoint's revenues and helped to expand relationships with European retailers.

Two years later, Checkpoint bought A.W. Printing Inc., a U.S.-based printer of tickets, tags, and labels for apparel retailers and brand owners. This acquisition expanded the company's label printing operations and gave entrée to customers in the soft goods market segment.

By the mid-2000s, Checkpoint had a source tagging program, facilitated by the company's service bureau business. Check-Net®, a web-based platform, started to provide apparel retailers and brand owners with a repository and logistics service to manage all their retail labeling needs.

In 2006, Checkpoint further expanded its source tagging business with new print technology and production capabilities through the purchase of ADS Worldwide, a UK‑based supplier of apparel labels, tags, and trim products.

=== Acquisitions (2007–present) ===
Over the next five years, several acquisitions enabled Checkpoint to extend its offering of merchandise availability applications for retailers:

- In 2007, Alpha S3. A U.S.-based provider of security products for protecting high-theft merchandise; and SIDEP, a supplier of EAS systems operating in France and China.
- In 2008, Asialco Electronics Company. A China-based manufacturer of RF-EAS labels to meet growing demand in emerging Asian markets.
- Also in 2008, OATSystems. An RFID application software company, founded by Prasad Putta and Dr. Sanjay Sarma (who co-founded the MIT Auto‑ID Lab), enabled Checkpoint to provide tracking and inventory management solutions throughout the supply chain.
- In 2009, Brilliant Label Manufacturing Ltd. A China-based manufacturer of apparel labels and tags added more labeling products for the global apparel industry.
- In 2011, Shore to Shore. A global manufacturer of labels and tags for apparel and footwear expanded Checkpoint's production, capabilities, and global reach.
- In 2016, Checkpoint announces a collaboration with Microsoft Corp. to bring their RFID Merchandise Visibility solutions to the cloud, and utilize Microsoft analytical tools.
- In 2016, acquired by CCL Industries and announced collaboration with Microsoft to bring RFID merchandise visibility to cloud platforms.
- In 2025, launched Chinook RFID inlay, the first microwave-safe, reusable food-packaging RFID inlay, supporting circular economy applications."Checkpoint Systems Boosts Smart Food Chain with Chinook™ Inlay".
- In 2025, opened a 10,000 m² RFID manufacturing facility in Mexico City with a capacity to produce 4.2 billion inlays/year, including blank, printed, and encoded versions; certified to SMETA and FSC CoC standards.
- Combined with its China production facility, Checkpoint's total global inlay capacity reaches ~7.5 billion RFID inlays per year.
