= CCL Industries =

American-Canadian label maker

CCL Industries Inc.
- Type: Public
- Traded as: TSX: CCL.B; S&P/TSX 60 Component
- Industry: Packaging & Containers
- Founded: 1951; 75 years ago (as Connecticut Chemicals (Canada) Ltd)
- Headquarters: Toronto, Canada & Framingham, Massachusetts
- Number of locations: 199 factories
- Key people: Geoffrey T. Martin (CEO)
- Revenue: ▲4.0 billion C$ (2016)
- Net income: ▲346 million C$ (2016)
- Number of employees: 20,000 (2016)
- Website: cclind.com

CCL Industries, Inc., is an American-Canadian company founded in 1951. It describes itself as the world's largest label maker. It is listed on the Toronto Stock Exchange, and is an S&P/TSX 60 Component. CCL consists of five divisions – CCL Label, CCL Container, Avery, Checkpoint, and Innovia. It has 154 manufacturing facilities in North America, Latin America, Europe, Asia, Australia and Africa operated by approximately 20,000 employees.

== History ==
CCL was founded in 1951 as Connecticut Chemicals (Canada) Limited. In 1979, the name was changed to CCL Industries. It originally focused on custom manufacturing for the Canadian consumer products industry. Starting in the 1980s, it expanded into labels and other packaging, and also expanded internationally into the United States and the United Kingdom. It went public on the Toronto Stock Exchange in 1980. In the 2000s, it started shifting away from custom manufacturing and towards labels and packaging; in 2005, it sold its custom manufacturing business to KCP Income Fund for $256 million. In 2006, it sold its interest in ColepCCP, a European custom manufacturing joint venture with Portuguese company RAR, for $140 million. In 2013, it acquired Avery for $500 million from Avery Dennison, its biggest acquisition to that time. In 2015, it bought Worldmark, a British labelling company specializing in labels for the technology sector, for $255 million. In 2016, it acquired Checkpoint Systems for $422 million. In December 2016, CCL acquired Innovia Films, a British specialty films company, for $1.13 billion Canadian Dollars. In 2017, it joined the S&P/TSX 60.

== Business ==
CCL provides labels and packaging products to various markets, including consumer product, healthcare, and industrial companies. Specific markets served include the home product, personal care, food & beverage, pharmaceutical, apparel, industrial chemical, automotive, and electronics markets. As of 2016, 5% of sales were in Canada, 46% were in the United States, 7% were in Latin America, 28% were in Europe, and the other 14% were in Asia-Pacific and Africa.

== Divisions ==
=== CCL Label ===
CCL's Label segment is the company's largest business division, accounting for approximately 63% of total sales in 2016. The division manufactures pressure-sensitive and extruded film materials for global consumer product and healthcare corporations.

The segment produces a variety of specialized packaging and labeling products, including expanded content labels, two-ply labels, WashOff labels, shrink sleeves, radio-frequency identification (RFID) tags, and promotional materials.

=== CCL Container ===
Container business contributes approximately 6% to CCL's total sales and is a manufacturer of aluminum cans and beverage bottles in North America.

=== Avery ===
Contributing approximately 20% to CCL's total sales, Avery was acquired from Avery Dennison in 2013 and supplies media for use in digital printers.

=== Checkpoint Systems ===
Acquired in 2016, Checkpoint contributes approximately 11% of CCL's total sales. It provides loss-prevention and inventory management labelling for clothing retailers.

=== Innovia Films ===
Acquired in December 2016, Innovia manufactures specialty films for packaging, labelling, graphic arts and industrial products.
