= Leasi Papali'i Tommy Scanlan =

Samoan diplomat

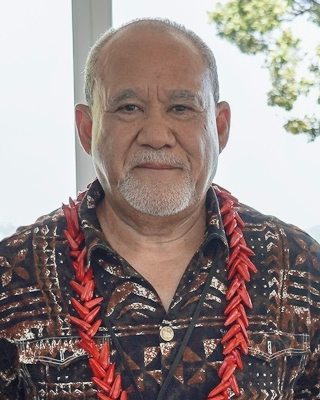
Scanlan in 2021

Leasi Papali'i Tommy Scanlan is a Samoan diplomat who served as high commissioner of the Independent State of Samoa to New Zealand from 2012 till 2022. From 2017 till the end of his term, he also served as the dean of the diplomatic corps in New Zealand. Before becoming a diplomat he served as the Governor of the Central Bank of Samoa from 1989 to 2011.
