= Real gross domestic product =

Macroeconomic measure

Real gross domestic product (real GDP) is a macroeconomic measure of the value of economic output adjusted for price changes (i.e. inflation or deflation). This adjustments transforms the money-value measure, nominal GDP, into an index for quantity of total output. Although GDP is total output, it is primarily useful because it closely approximates the total spending: the sum of consumer spending, investment made by industry, excess of exports over imports, and government spending. Due to inflation, nominal GDP can increase even when physical output is fixed, and so does not actually reflect the true growth in an economy. Real GDP is derived from current-dollar GDP by valuing output in a way that removes the effects of price change. In the United States, the Bureau of Economic Analysis reports chained-dollar measures that allow output in different periods to be compared. Quarterly U.S. GDP figures are generally seasonally adjusted and expressed at annual rates unless otherwise stated. Different organizations use different types of 'Real GDP' measures, for example, the UNCTAD uses 2015 Constant prices and exchange rates while the FRED uses 2009 constant prices and exchange rates, and recently the World Bank switched from 2005 to 2010 constant prices and exchange rates.

Real GDP contrasts with real gross domestic income, which is adjusted for price changes with a different method.

10 largest countries by GDP according to the UNCTAD at 2015 constant prices and exchange rates, 2023
Economy	Top 10 countries by GDP in 2023 (millions in 2015 constant USD and exchange rates)
(01) United States	22,062,582
(02) China	17,175,673
(03) Japan	4,605,912
(04) Germany	3,692,367
(05) India	3,281,972
(06) United Kingdom	3,234,504
(07) France	2,671,235
(08) Italy	2,010,975
(09) Brazil	1,961,081
(10) Canada	1,783,096

== Economic sectors of nations using real GDP ==
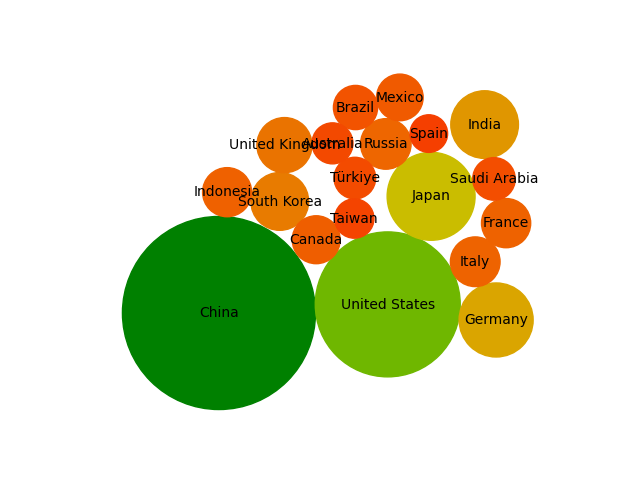
20 largest economies by industrial output at 2015 constant prices, 2022.

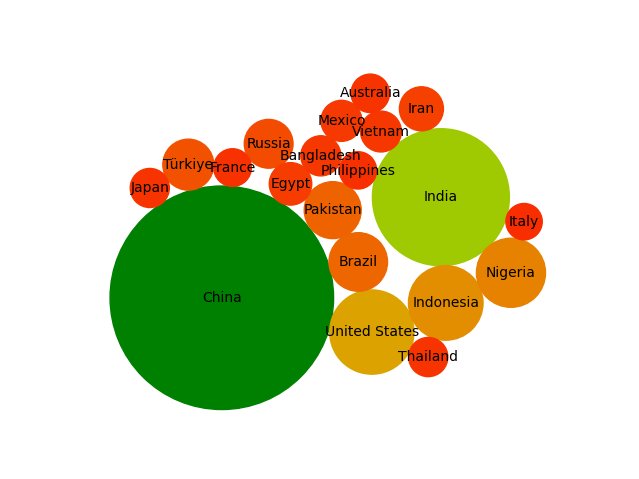
20 largest economies by agricultural output at 2015 constant prices, 2022.

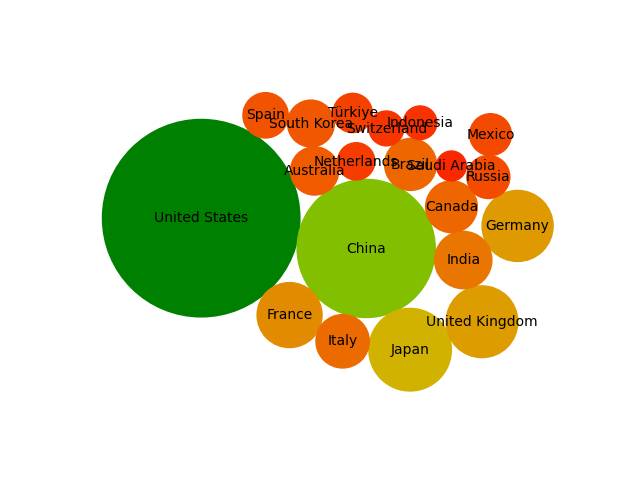
20 largest economies by tertiary output at 2015 constant prices, 2022.

20 largest countries by industrial output according to the UNCTAD at 2015 constant prices and exchange rates, 2023
Economy	Top 20 countries by industrial output in 2023 (millions in 2015 constant USD and exchange rates)
(01) China	6,780,115
(02) United States	3,788,833
(03) Japan	1,361,414
(04) Germany	914,795
(05) India	868,963
(06) South Korea	645,326
(07) United Kingdom	536,823
(08) Russia	452,695
(09) Indonesia	443,856
(10) Italy	431,352
(11) France	421,953
(12) Canada	406,011
(13) Mexico	391,740
(14) Brazil	350,221
(15) Turkey	311,444
(16) Saudi Arabia	298,996
(17) Australia	295,409
(18) Spain	259,268
(19) Taiwan	254,780

Largest countries by agricultural output according to the UNCTAD at 2015 constant prices and exchange rates, 2023
Economy	Countries by agricultural output in 2023 (millions in 2015 constant USD and exchange rates)
(01) China	1,332,826
(02) India	495,223
(03) United States	204,784
(04) Indonesia	144,226
(05) Nigeria	123,499

Largest countries by tertiary (services) output according to the UNCTAD at 2015 constant prices and exchange rates, 2023
Economy	Countries by tertiary (services) output in 2023 (millions in 2015 constant USD and exchange rates)
(01) United States	18,235,009
(02) China	9,154,821
(03) Japan	3,189,621
(04) Germany	2,391,977
(05) United Kingdom	2,301,875

== Relationship with nominal GDP ==
Real GDP is an example of the distinction between real and nominal values in economics. Nominal gross domestic product is defined as the market value of all final goods produced in a geographical region, usually a country; this depends on the quantities of goods and services produced, and their respective prices.

If a set of real GDPs from various years are calculated, each using the quantities from its own year, but all using the prices from the same base year, the differences in those real GDPs will reflect only differences in volume.

An index called the GDP deflator can be obtained by dividing, for each year, the nominal GDP by the real GDP, so that the GDP deflator for the base year will be 100. It gives an indication of the overall level of price change (inflation or deflation) in the economy.

GDP deflator for year $t=\frac{Nominal\;GDP_t}{Real\;GDP_t}\times100$

Real GDP growth on an annual basis is the nominal GDP growth rate adjusted for inflation. It is usually expressed as a percentage.

"GDP" may refer to "nominal" or "current" or "historical" GDP, to distinguish it from real GDP. Real GDP is sometimes called "constant" GDP because it is expressed in terms of constant prices. Depending on context, "GDP" may also refer to real GDP.

== See also ==
- Real income
- List of countries by real GDP growth rate
