= List of currencies in Asia =

This is the list of currencies now in circulation in Asia.

== Asian currencies ==
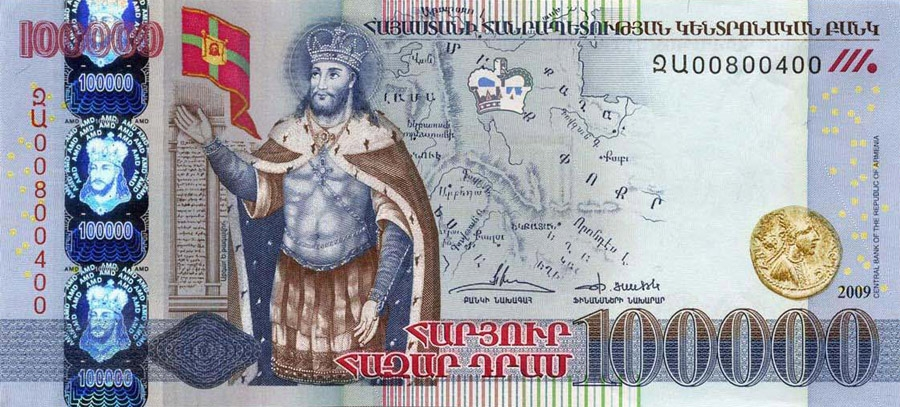
A 100,000 Armenian dram banknote.

List of all Asian currencies
Present currency	ISO 4217 code	Country or dependency (administrating country)	Currency sign	Fractional unit
Russian Ruble	RUB	Abkhazia	₽	Kopek
Afghan afghani	AFN	Afghanistan	؋	pul
Euro	EUR	Akrotiri and Dhekelia (Great Britain)	€	cent
Armenian dram	AMD	Armenia		luma
Azerbaijani manat	AZN	Azerbaijan		Qəpik
Bahraini dinar	BHD	Bahrain	.د.ب	Fils
Taka	BDT	Bangladesh	৳	Poisha
Bhutanese ngultrum	BTN	Bhutan	Nu	Chhertum
Pound Sterling	GBP	British Indian Ocean Territory (Great Britain)	£	Pence
Brunei dollar	BND	Brunei	B$	Cent
Cambodian riel	KHR	Cambodia	៛	sen (no longer used)
Chinese Renminbi (yuan)	CNY	China	¥	Jiao
Australian dollar	AUD	Christmas Island (Australia)	A$	cent
Australian dollar	AUD	Cocos (Keeling) Islands (Australia)	A$	cent
Euro	EUR	Cyprus	€	cent
Lari	GEL	Georgia	₾	Tetri
Hong Kong dollar	HKD	Hong Kong	HK$	cent
Indian Rupee	INR	India	₹	paisa
Rupiah	IDR	Indonesia	Rp	Sen
Iranian rial	IRR	Iran	﷼	Dinar
Iraqi dinar	IQD	Iraq	ع.د	Fils
Israeli new shekel	ILS	Israel	₪	Agora
Yen	JPY	Japan	¥	Sen
Jordanian dinar	JOD	Jordan	ينار	Qirsh
Kazakhstani tenge	KZT	Kazakhstan	₸	Tiin
Kuwaiti dinar	KWD	Kuwait	ك	Fils
Kyrgyzstani som	KGS	Kyrgyzstan		Tyiyn
Lao kip	LAK	Laos	₭	Att
Lebanese pound	LBP	Lebanon	£L and ل.ل	Piastre
Macanese pataca	MOP	Macau	MOP$	Ho
Ringgit	MYR	Malaysia	RM	Sen
Maldivian rufiyaa	MVR	Maldives	MRf	Laari
Mongolian tögrög	MNT	Mongolia	₮	Möngö
Kyat	MMK	Myanmar	K	Pya
Nepalese rupee	NPR	Nepal	Rs	Paisa
Turkish lira	TRY	Northern Cyprus		Kuruş
North Korean won	KPW	North Korea	₩	Chon
Omani rial	OMR	Oman		Baisa
Pakistani Rupee	PKR	Pakistan	Rs	Paisa
Israeli new shekel	ILS	Palestine	₪	Agora
Philippine peso	PHP	Philippines	₱	Sentimo
Qatari riyal	QAR	Qatar	ر.ق	Dirham
Russian Ruble	RUB	Russia	₽	Kopek
Saudi riyal	SAR	Saudi Arabia		Halala
Singapore dollar	SGD	Singapore	$	Cent
South Korean won	KRW	South Korea	₩	Jeon
Russian Ruble	RUB	South Ossetia	₽	Kopek
Sri Lankan rupee	LKR	Sri Lanka	Rs	Cent
Syrian pound	SYP	Syria	£S	Piastre
New Taiwan dollar	TWD	Taiwan	NT$	Jiao
Somoni	TJS	Tajikistan	TJS	diram
Baht	THB	Thailand	฿	Satang
US dollar	USD	Timor-Leste	US$	Centavo
Turkish lira	TRY	Turkey		Kuruş
Turkmen manat	TMT	Turkmenistan	m	Tenne
UAE dirham	AED	United Arab Emirates		Fils
Uzbek soum (O'zbekiston so'mi)	UZS	Uzbekistan	sum	Tiyin
đồng	VND	Vietnam	₫	Hao
Yemeni rial	YER	Yemen	rial	Fils

== See also ==
- List of circulating currencies
