= Samoan tālā =

Currency of Samoa

Sāmoa tālā (Samoan)

ISO 4217
- Code: WST (numeric: 882)
- Subunit: 0.01

Units of account
- Symbol: $ (sometimes WST, SAT, ST or T)
- Subunit
- 1/100: sene

Denominations
- Banknotes: $5, $10, $20, $50, $100
- Coins: 10, 20, 50 sene, $1 and $2

Demographics
- Date of introduction: 10 July 1967
- Replaced: Western Samoan pound
- User(s): Samoa

Issuance
- Central bank: Central Bank of Samoa
- Website: www.cbs.gov.ws

Valuation
- Inflation: 1.3%
- Source: The World Factbook, 2017

The tālā is the currency of Samoa. It is divided into 100 sene. The terms tālā and sene are cognates of the English words dollar and cent in the Samoan language. Its symbol is $, or WS$ to distinguish it from other currencies named dollar.

The word 'tala' is also derived from the German word 'Thaler', and pronounced the same.

The tālā was introduced on 10 July 1967, following the country's political independence from New Zealand in 1962. Until that time, Samoa had used the pound, with coins from New Zealand and its own banknotes. The tālā replaced the pound at a rate of 2 tālā = 1 pound and was, therefore, equal to the New Zealand dollar. The tālā remained equal to the New Zealand dollar until 1975.

The symbol WS$ is still used for the tālā, representing the country's previous name Western Samoa, used up to 1997, when the word Western was officially removed and the country became known as just Samoa. Therefore, the symbol SAT, ST and T appear to be in use as well.

Sometimes figures are written with the dollar sign in front, followed by "tālā". e.g. $100 tālā.

The Samoan currency is issued and regulated by the Central Bank of Samoa.

== Coins ==
Prior to 1967, New Zealand coins were used in Western Samoa, circulating alongside locally issued and New Zealand banknotes.

In 1967, five and a half years after independence, new coins and notes were introduced replacing the New Zealand Pound as the official currency. Coins were introduced in denominations of 1, 2, 5, 10, 20, 50 sene and $1 in equal size to the coins of New Zealand. 1 and 2 sene coins were struck in bronze, while the higher denominations were struck in cupro-nickel. All featured the national emblem on the reverse and the then Head of State Malietoa Tanumafili on the obverse.

In 1974, a new coin series was introduced, designed by James Berry with a theme centred on locally grown food plants. The edges of the 50 sene coin were also changed from alternating plain and reeded to only reeded. In 1984, a seven-sided 1 tālā coin was introduced in aluminum bronze to replace the note. The coin depicted the state emblem on the reverse. Although $1 tālā pieces had been introduced in earlier years, this coin's bulky size and weight along with the favoured use of the equivalent banknote never saw to popular and widespread use.

In 2000, a commemorative 2 Sene coin was released commemorating the 21st century with an FAO theme.

The 1974–2011 series featured as follows:

- 1 sene: Coconut
- 2 sene: Cocoa pods
- 5 sene: pineapple
- 10 sene: Taro plant
- 20 sene: Breadfruit
- 50 sene: Banana tree
- $1 (1974): Palm tree
- $1 (1984): National crest

In 2011, the 1 and 2 and 5 sene coins were withdrawn from circulation as production costs exceeded production and their use in circulation had diminished significantly over the years. A new coin series was also introduced with reduced sizes and new shapes to reduce production costs and to reflect a more modern, streamlined Samoa. The new coins feature the then Head of State, Tui Atua Tupua Tamasese Efi and are themed around local culture. The new coin series also includes a new scalloped edge $2 struck in bronze plated steel intended to replace the 2 Tala polymer banknote. The $1 is also struck in bronze plated steel and retains its original seven-sided shape but smaller. The reduced 5, 10, 20, and 50 sene are struck in nickel-plated steel. As Samoan coins are prone to heavy wear and use, the designs and composition were also studied and chosen with this in mind.

The 2011-series depict as follows:

- 10 sene: Fautasi canoe racers
- 20 sene: Teuila flower
- 50 sene: Manumea bird
- $1: Kava bowl and fly swatter
- $2: National crest

These coins have been struck at the Royal Australian Mint in Canberra.

== Treasury notes ==
Pound and shilling treasury notes were issued from 1920 to 1963 as the Western Samoan pound at par with the New Zealand pound.

Banknotes of the Western Samoa Trust Territory, now the Independent State of Samoa, were issued by the Authority of the New Zealand Government, which governed the islands up until 1962. In 1915, the first provisional notes (dated 1914, but issued 1915) were issued by the New Zealand Occupying Military force. These were overprinted one pound and five pound notes of the Bank of New Zealand signed by Lt. Colonel Logan and overprinted 10 shillings notes were added in 1920. In 1922, Treasury Notes were issued “by the authority of the New Zealand Government” in denominations of 10 shillings and one and five pounds. They were issued until 1961 when the Bank of Western Samoa took over paper money issuance. Its first issues were overprints on the Treasury Notes. In 1963, regular type notes were introduced in the same denominations.

== Banknotes ==
After independence, finance was taken over by the new government and a new currency called the tālā was issued. Tālā banknotes were first issued in 1967 in denominations of $1, $2, and $10 with the same colour as the corresponding pre-decimal banknotes by the "Bank of Western Samoa." In 1980, a $5 note was issued shortly after the "Monetary Board of Western Samoa" was created.

Beginning in 1985, the new Central Bank of Samoa followed issued notes like the preceding issue from the Monetary Board of Western Samoa, but with the new issuer's name in both Samoan and English. The $1 note was discontinued, and new denominations of $50 and $100 were issued in 1990.

On 29 September 1991, a $2 note was issued to commemorate the Golden Jubilee (50th anniversary) of Malietoa Tanumafili II as head of state. It was the first and only fully polymer note issued by Samoa. These were withdrawn in 2011 and replaced with the 2-tālā coin.

In 2008 a new series in denominations of $5 to $100 produced by De La Rue was introduced with brighter colours, new security features, and modern designs.

The two highest denominations ($50 and $100) are protected with De La Rue's Optiks security thread which features a see-through window.

Banknotes series 2008
Image		Value	Dimensions (mm)	Composition colour	Description		Year Print
Obverse	Reverse	Value	Dimensions (mm)	Composition colour	Obverse	Reverse	Year Print
		$5	72 х 140	Red	Samoan fale and trees in a bay	Villa Vailima, former residence of Robert Louis Stevenson in Mount Vaea, Samoa	2008
		$10	72 х 140	blue	Manu Samoa 7s, national rugby union team, winning the Hong Kong Sevens in 2007.	A group of children.	2008
		$20	72 х 140	Yellow	The 50m Sopo'aga Waterfall situated on Le Mafa Pass Road, Upolu island.	Manumea or Samoan pigeon (Didunculus strigirostris), national bird of Samoa.	2008
		$50	72 х 140 paper + plastic	Purple	Government of Samoa office building, Apia	Central Bank of Samoa office building, Apia	2008
		$100	72 х 140 paper + plastic	green	Portrait of the late Malietoa Tanumafili II	Cathedral of Apia	2008

== Exchange rate ==
Current WST exchange rates
From Google Finance:	AUD CAD CHF CNY EUR GBP HKD JPY USD NZD
From Yahoo! Finance:	AUD CAD CHF CNY EUR GBP HKD JPY USD NZD
From XE.com:	AUD CAD CHF CNY EUR GBP HKD JPY USD NZD
From OANDA:	AUD CAD CHF CNY EUR GBP HKD JPY USD NZD

== See also ==
- Economy of Samoa
- Australian dollar
- United States dollar
- New Zealand dollar
- Fijian dollar
- Solomon Islands dollar
