= Central Bank of Samoa =

Central Bank of Samoa Faletupe Tutotonu o Samoa

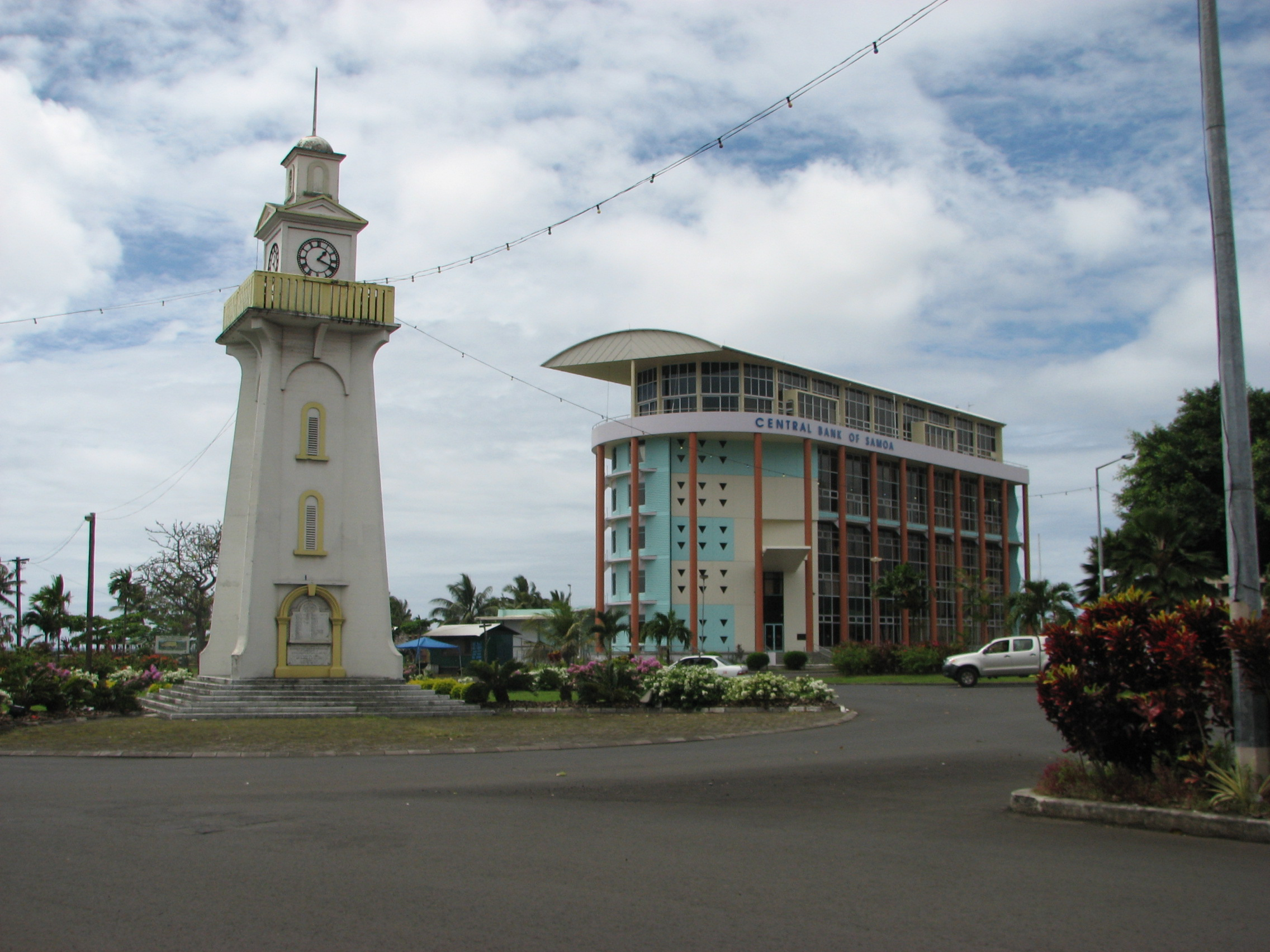
- CBS headquarters in Apia, Samoa
- Central bank of: Samoa
- Headquarters: Apia, Samoa
- Established: 25 February 1984
- Ownership: 100% state ownership
- Governor: Atalina Ainuu-Enari
- Currency: Samoan tālā WST (ISO 4217)
- Reserves: 120 million USD
- Website: www.cbs.gov.ws
- Other Samoan currency symbols used also include SAT, ST or T.

The Central Bank of Samoa (Samoan: Faletupe Tutotonu o Samoa), situated in the capital Apia beside the main government buildings, issues the Samoan currency, the Samoan tālā as well as regulates and manages the exchange rate with foreign currencies. In its role as the central bank for the government and the country, it is also responsible for the registration and supervision of commercial banks. The current governor since 2011 has been Maiava Atalina Emma Ainuu-Enari.

Legally, the bank follows a mandate pursuant to the Central Bank of Samoa Act 1984, the Financial Institutions Act 1996 and the Money Laundering Prevention Act 2000. The Central Bank of Samoa was preceded by Monetary Board established in 1975.

The bank is engaged in developing policies to promote financial inclusion and is a member of the Alliance for Financial Inclusion. The institution made a Maya Declaration Commitment in 2013 with an intent to build an inclusive financial system in Samoa that serves all members of society.

Its official name in the Samoan language, Faletupe Tutotonu o Samoa, means 'Central Bank (lit. Central Money House) of Samoa'.

== Head office ==
The head office for the bank is situated in the capital Apia, near the government buildings and by a historic clock tower.

== Governors ==
- William E. Davies, Australian, January 1984 - February 1987
- John A. Howard, Briton, February 1987 - April 1989
- Leasi Papali'i Tommy Scanlan, April 1989 - August 2011
- Atalina Ainuu-Enari, August 2011 -

== See also ==
- Economy of Samoa
- List of central banks
- List of financial supervisory authorities by country
