= Central Bank of Solomon Islands =

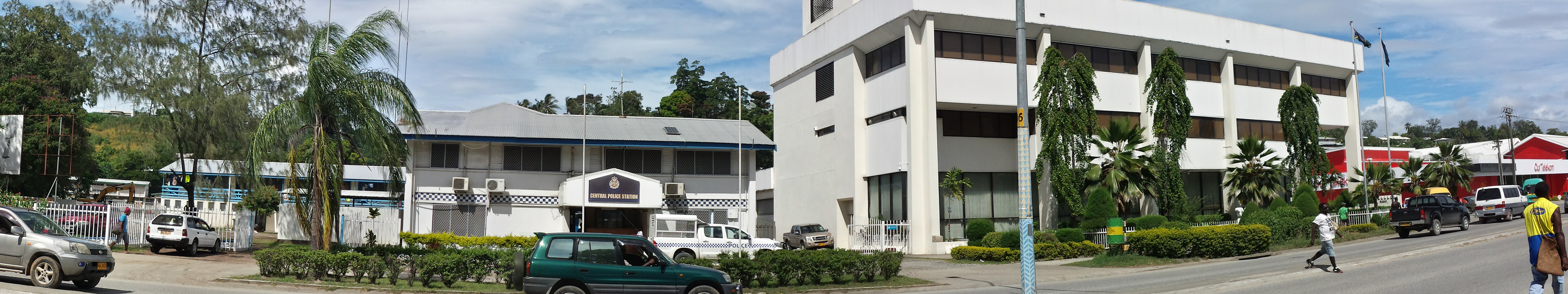
- Central Bank and Central Police Station
- Headquarters: Honiara
- Coordinates: 9°25′51″S 159°57′19″E
- Established: 1983
- Ownership: 100% state ownership
- Governor: Luke Forau
- Central bank of: Solomon Islands
- Currency: Solomon Islands dollar SBD (ISO 4217)
- Reserves: 480 million USD
- Preceded by: Solomon Islands Monetary Authority
- Website: www.cbsi.com.sb

The Central Bank of Solomon Islands is the central bank of Solomon Islands located in capital city of Honiara. The Bank was established in February 1983 under the Central Bank of Solomon Islands Act 1976, which converted the Solomon Island Monetary Authority (SIMA) into a central bank. The current governor is Dr. Luke Forau.

== Functions ==
Its official functions, under the CBSI Act of 2012, Section 9 include determining monetary policy, managing exchange rates, managing internal reserves, issuing currency, engaging in international relations relating to monetary policy, and regulating financial institutions.

The Bank is engaged in developing policies to promote financial inclusion and is a member of the Alliance for Financial Inclusion.

== Governors ==
- John G. FG. Palfrey, 1976-1978
- Barry A. Longmuir, 1978-1980
- Philip Coney, 1980-1981
- Anthony V. Hughes, 1981-1993
- Rick Houenipwela, 1993-2008
- Denton Rarawa, 2008-2019
- Luke Forau, 2019-

== See also ==
- Economy of Solomon Islands
- Solomon Islands dollar
- List of central banks
