= Solomon Islands dollar =

Currency of the Solomon Islands

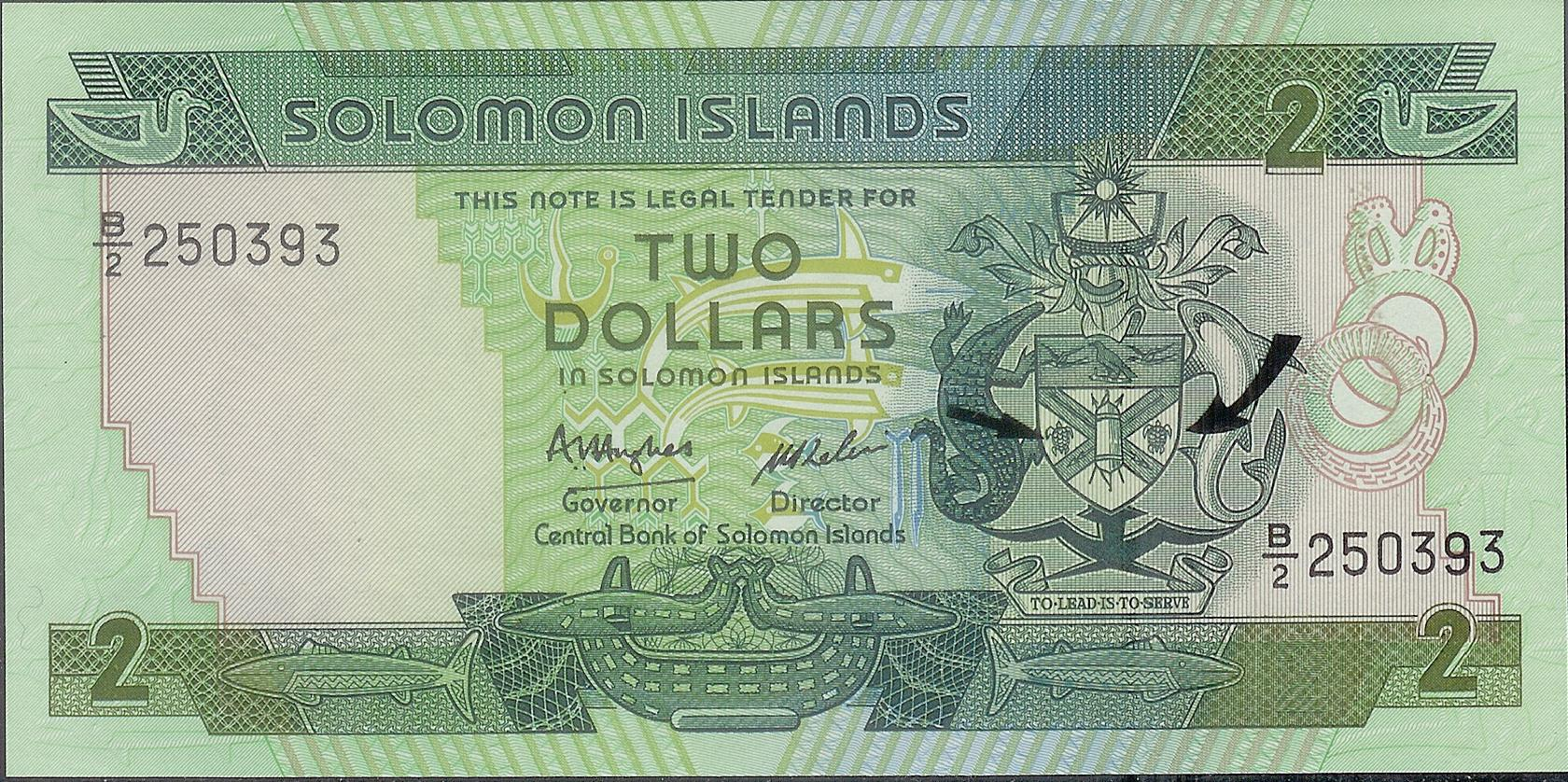
- Solomon Islands $2 banknote

ISO 4217
- Code: SBD (numeric: 090)
- Subunit: 0.01

Unit
- Symbol: $, SI$

Denominations
- Subunit
- 1/100: cent
- Banknotes: $5, $10, $20, $50, $100
- Rarely used: $2, $40
- Coins: 10, 20, 50 cents, $1, $2

Demographics
- Date of introduction: 1977
- Replaced: Australian dollar
- User(s): Solomon Islands

Issuance
- Central bank: Central Bank of Solomon Islands
- Website: www.cbsi.com.sb

Valuation
- Inflation: 9.0%
- Source: Central Bank of Solomon Islands, January 2023.

The Solomon Islands dollar (ISO 4217 code: SBD) is the currency of Solomon Islands since 1977. Its symbol is $, with SI$ used to differentiate it from other currencies also using the dollar sign. It is subdivided into 100 cents.

== History ==
Prior to the Solomon Islands Dollar, Solomon Islands used the Australian pound. However, the Solomon Islands had also issued its own banknotes, sometimes called the Solomon Islands pound.

When the Solomon Islands fell under the control of Imperial Japan during the Second World War, the Oceanian pound, a so-called "Japanese Invasion Currency", became the official currency until after the war ended and the Pound was restored.

In 1966, the Australian dollar replaced the pound and was circulated in the Solomon Islands until 1976, shortly before independence.

The Solomon Islands dollar was introduced in 1977, replacing the Australian dollar at par, following independence. Until 1979, the two dollars remained equal, then for five months the SI$ was pegged at SI$1 = A$1.05 (apparently revalued to reduce imported inflation), and later floated. Economic stagnation ensued, so over the next 28 years, and especially during the civil war of 2000–2003, inflationary pressure reduced the Solomon Islands dollar to be worth 15 Australian cents.

In 2008, due to the low valuation in the currency, many Islanders took to hoarding coins and giving them to children as souvenirs, causing a coin shortage. Some more traditional monetary forms, such as dolphin teeth, have in a few areas taken the place of coins. A public awareness campaign was launched to encourage people to cash in excess coins at the bank to help alleviate the shortfall.

== Coins ==
In 1977, coins were introduced in denominations of 1, 2, 5, 10 and 20 cents and 1 dollar. The cent coins were all the same sizes, weights, and compositions as the corresponding Australian coins, with the 1 dollar an equilaterally curved seven-sided coin minted in cupro-nickel. The reverse of each of the six original coins depicts the image of an item or symbol important to native culture, with the most notable being the 10 cent piece depicting Ngoreru, a local sea god from the Temoto region.

In 1985, bronze-plated steel replaced bronze in the 1 and 2 cents, with nickel-clad steel replacing cupro-nickel in the 20 cents in 1989, and the 5 and 10 cents in 1990. 1988 saw the introduction of 50 cent coins, which were dodecagonal (twelve-sided) and minted in cupro-nickel. The 1988 50 cent was a commemorative piece celebrating the tenth anniversary of independence. Later issues simply depict the national crest. The 50-cent and 1 dollar went to nickel-clad steel in 2008.

With a high national inflation rate, the low-value 1 and 2 cent coins fell out of use, with prices rounded off to the nearest 5 cents instead.

=== Second coin series ===
In 2012, new, smaller coins were introduced in denominations 10, 20, and 50 cents in nickel-plated steel and brass 1, and 2 dollar coins. The minting of the older coins had become too costly, with most of them being more expensive to produce than they were worth. Like the previous issue, these coins were minted by the Royal Australian Mint. The 2 dollar coin replaced the banknote while the 1, 2, and 5 cent coins were discontinued for having face value too low for production or practical use. Most notably, the 1 and 2 dollar coins have a close similarity to the 1 and 2 dollar coins of Australia being of nearly the same thickness, color, and circumference. The interrupted reeding on the edges are also identical to that of their Australian counterparts, however, the metallurgical compositions and weights are slightly different and respective denominations are on the opposite sizes.

All the coins of Solomon Islands currently bear the portrait of the country's former head of state, Elizabeth II, Queen of Solomon Islands.

== Banknotes ==
On 24 October 1977, banknotes were introduced in denominations of 2, 5 and 10 dollars, with 20 dollar notes added on 24 October 1980. The first issues of banknotes depicted Queen Elizabeth II. However, all series issued later had the national crest instead. 50 dollar notes were introduced in 1986, followed by 100 dollar notes in 2006. A polymer two dollar banknote was issued in 2001 to replace the cotton fibre issue, but the banknote reverted to cotton in the 2006 series.

The 2006 series also saw several new security features, including brighter background colours, a micro-printed holofoil on the 50 and 100 dollar notes, a tapered serial number, and a security thread woven through the note. On 26 September 2013, the Central Bank of the Solomon Islands issued a new 50-dollar note with hybrid security features by printers De La Rue and announced it to be the first of a series of new banknotes over the course of five years as older notes wore out.

All of the notes depict scenes of traditional daily life and things that are culturally important in the islands, with each note pertaining to a particular theme.

All banknotes are issued by the Central Bank of Solomon Islands.

Banknotes of the Solomon Islands dollar
Image		Value	Main Colour	Description		Date of issue
Obverse	Reverse	Value	Main Colour	Obverse	Reverse	
		SI$2	Green	Coat of arms of Solomon Islands	Fishermen	2006
		SI$5	Blue	Coat of arms of Solomon Islands	Longboat	2004
		SI$10	Pink	Coat of arms of Solomon Islands	A weaver	2005
		SI$20	Brown	Coat of arms of Solomon Islands	Some warriors	2004
		SI$50	Green	Coat of arms of Solomon Islands	Geckos, shells	2005
		SI$100	Light brown	Coat of arms of Solomon Islands	Coconut harvesting	2006

== Exchange rate ==
Current SBD exchange rates
From Google Finance:	AUD CAD CHF CNY EUR GBP HKD JPY USD NZD
From Yahoo! Finance:	AUD CAD CHF CNY EUR GBP HKD JPY USD NZD
From XE.com:	AUD CAD CHF CNY EUR GBP HKD JPY USD NZD
From OANDA:	AUD CAD CHF CNY EUR GBP HKD JPY USD NZD

== See also ==
- Solomon Islands
- Economy of Solomon Islands
- Australian dollar
- New Zealand dollar
- Fijian dollar
