= Banknotes of Scotland =

Scottish banknotes of the pound sterling

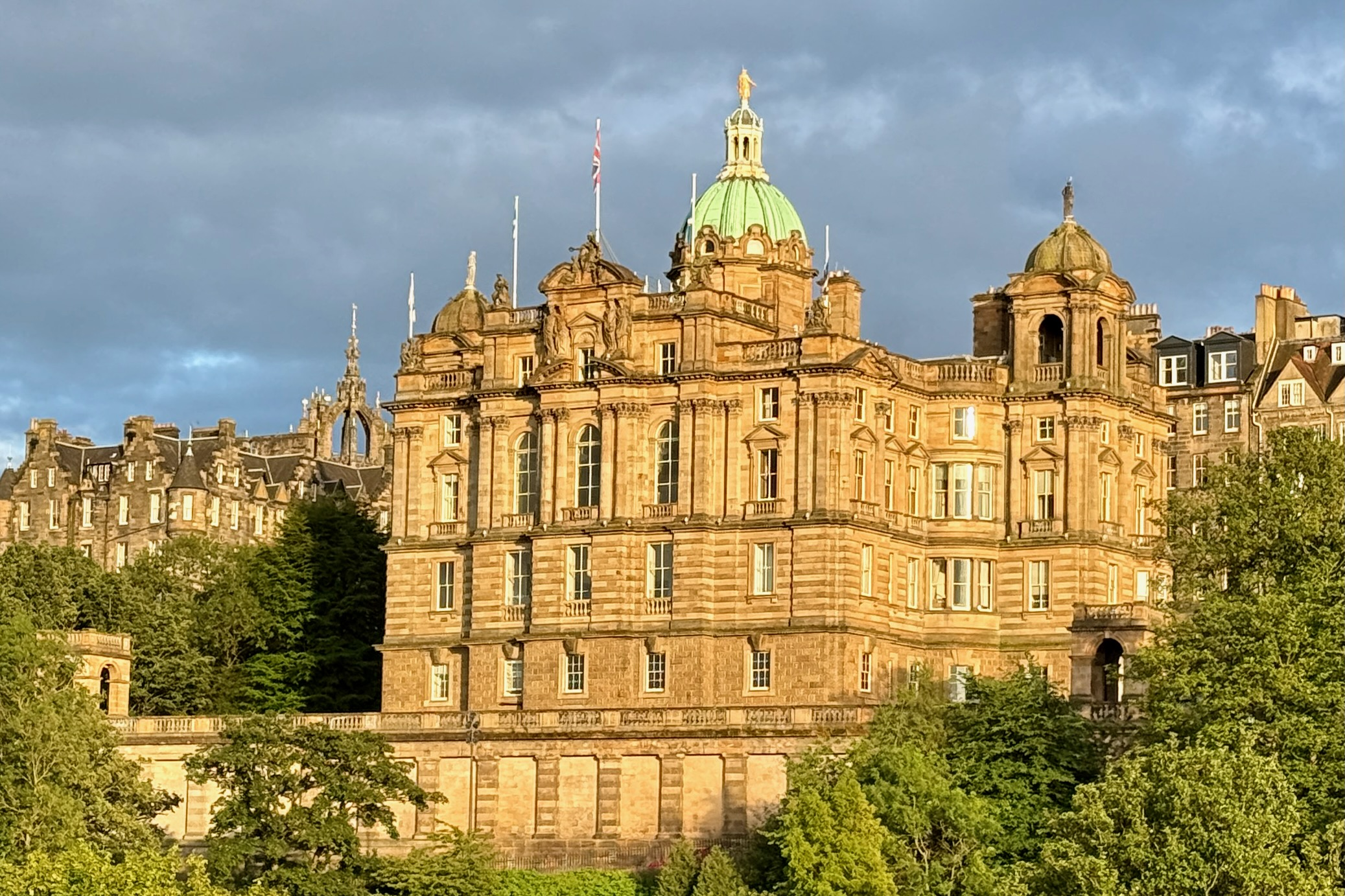
The Bank of Scotland was the first bank in Europe to successfully print its own banknotes

Banknotes of Scotland are the banknotes of the pound sterling that are issued by three Scottish retail banks (Bank of Scotland, the Royal Bank of Scotland and Clydesdale Bank) and circulate in Scotland. The Bank of Scotland, the oldest bank operating in the country, was the first bank in Europe to successfully print its own banknotes in 1695. The issuing of banknotes by retail banks in Scotland is subject to the Banking Act 2009, which repealed all earlier legislation under which banknote issuance was regulated, and the Scottish and Northern Ireland Banknote Regulations 2009. Currently, only these three retail banks are allowed to print notes for circulation in Scotland.

Scottish banknotes are unusual, as they are issued by retail banks (not government central banks) and because they are not legal tender in the United Kingdom — including Scotland, where, in law, no banknotes (including those issued by the Bank of England) are defined as legal tender. Formally, they are classified as promissory notes, and the law requires that the issuing banks hold a sum of Bank of England banknotes or gold equivalent to the total value of notes issued.

As the notes are not legal tender, they are not withdrawn from circulation in the same way as the Bank of England notes, which cease to be legal tender on a given date. Instead, the Scottish banks withdraw old notes from circulation as they are banked. Any notes still in circulation continue to be honoured by banks, but retailers may refuse to accept older notes.

== Banknotes ==
For ease of identification, all three issuing banks in Scotland use the same principal colour for each denomination: blue for £5, brown for £10, purple for £20, red for £50, and turquoise for £100. This colour scheme is similar to current Bank of England notes (except that the Bank of England does not issue a £100 note). The size of the notes is also consistent across the three Scottish banks and the Bank of England.

=== Bank of Scotland notes ===
All Bank of Scotland notes bear a portrait of Sir Walter Scott on the obverse (front) in commemoration of his 1826 Malachi Malagrowther campaign for Scottish banks to retain the right to issue their own notes. The Bank of Scotland's 2007 series of banknotes is known as the Bridges of Scotland series. These notes were introduced on 17 September 2007, and show Scotland's most famous bridges on the reverse side. From 2016, the Bridges of Scotland series is being renewed with the issue of new polymer notes with designs that follow the same basic theme of bridges. The Tercentenary and 2007 series of notes are being withdrawn from circulation and replaced with the polymer series as these are issued, but older notes continue to be accepted at banks. In line with this, the Committee of Scottish Bankers encouraged the public to spend or exchange non-polymer five and ten pound notes before 1 March 2018, and twenty and fifty pound notes before 30 September 2022

Bank of Scotland banknotes
Denomination	Obverse	Reverse	Additional information
Polymer Series (2016 onwards)
£5	Sir Walter Scott	Brig o' Doon	In circulation
£10	Sir Walter Scott	Glenfinnan Viaduct	In circulation
£20	Sir Walter Scott	Forth Bridge	In circulation
£50	Sir Walter Scott	Falkirk Wheel & The Kelpies	In circulation
£100	Sir Walter Scott	Flora Murray	In circulation

Former Bank of Scotland paper banknotes, all withdrawn
Bridges of Scotland Series (2007)
Denomination	Obverse	Reverse	Date of withdrawal
£5	Sir Walter Scott	Brig o' Doon	1 March 2018
£10	Sir Walter Scott	Glenfinnan Viaduct	1 March 2018
£20	Sir Walter Scott	Forth Bridge	30 September 2022
£50	Sir Walter Scott	Falkirk Wheel	30 September 2022
£100	Sir Walter Scott	Kessock Bridge	29 September 2023
Tercentenary Series (1995)
£5	Sir Walter Scott	Vignette of oil and energy	
£10	Sir Walter Scott	Vignette of distilling and brewing	
£20	Sir Walter Scott	Vignette of education and research	
£50	Sir Walter Scott	Vignette of arts and culture	
£100	Sir Walter Scott	Vignette of leisure and tourism	

=== Royal Bank of Scotland notes ===
From May 2020, the Royal Bank of Scotland adopted a new series of banknotes, made of polymer. The £5 note shows poet Nan Shepherd on the obverse accompanied by a quote from her book The Living Mountain, and the Cairngorms in the background. The reverse displays two mackerel and an excerpt from the Scottish Gaelic poem ‘The Choice’ by Sorley MacLean. The obverse of the £10 note shows scientist Mary Somerville, with a quote from her work The Connection of the Physical Sciences, and Burntisland beach in the background. The reverse displays two otters and an excerpt from the poem ‘Moorings’ by Norman MacCaig. The obverse of the £20 note shows entrepreneur Catherine Cranston. The reverse shows two red squirrels and a quote from the Scots-language poem 'Venus and Cupid' by Mark Alexander Boyd. The obverse of the £50 note, in red to match the Bank of England £50 notes, depicts educationalist Flora Stevenson on its obverse and an osprey on the reverse.

The previous series of Royal Bank of Scotland notes, originally issued in 1987, is in the process of being replaced by a polymer series: the Committee of Scottish Bankers encouraged the public to spend or exchange non-polymer five and ten pound notes before 1 March 2018, and twenty and fifty pounds before 30 September 2022. On the front of each note is a picture of Lord Ilay (1682–1761), the first governor of the bank, based on a portrait painted in 1744 by the Edinburgh artist Allan Ramsay. The front of the notes also features an engraving of the bank's former headquarters in St Andrew Square, Edinburgh. The background graphic on both sides of the notes is a radial star design which is based on the ornate ceiling of the banking hall in the old headquarters building. On the back of the notes are images of Scottish castles, with a different castle for each denomination.

Occasionally the Royal Bank of Scotland issues commemorative banknotes. Examples are the £1 note issued to mark the 150th anniversary of the birth of Alexander Graham Bell in 1997, the £20 note for the 100th birthday of Queen Elizabeth The Queen Mother in 2000, the £5 note honouring veteran golfer Jack Nicklaus in his last competitive Open Championship at St Andrews in 2005, and the £10 note commemorating HM Queen Elizabeth II's Diamond Jubilee in 2012. These notes are much sought after by collectors.

Royal Bank of Scotland banknotes
Denomination	Obverse	Reverse	Additional information
Polymer Series (2016 onwards)
£5	Nan Shepherd	Mackerel	In circulation
£10	Mary Somerville	Otters	In circulation
£20	Catherine Cranston	Red squirrels	In circulation
£50	Flora Stevenson	Osprey	In circulation
Ilay Series (1987)
£1	Lord Ilay	Edinburgh Castle	In circulation

Former Royal Bank of Scotland banknotes, all withdrawn
Denomination	Obverse	Reverse	Additional information
Ilay Series (1987)
£5	Lord Ilay	Culzean Castle	
£10	Lord Ilay	Glamis Castle	
£20	Lord Ilay	Brodick Castle	
£50	Lord Ilay	Inverness Castle	
£100	Lord Ilay	Balmoral Castle	

=== Clydesdale Bank notes ===
Clydesdale Bank's polymer series came into circulation in March 2015, when the Clydesdale Bank became the first bank in Great Britain to issue polymer banknotes. The £5 commemorative notes, issued to mark the 125th anniversary of the construction of the Forth Bridge, contain several new security features including a reflective graphic printed over a transparent window in the banknote. The public were encouraged to spend or exchange non-polymer five and ten pound notes before 1 March 2018 and twenty and fifty pound notes before 30 September 2022.

The polymer notes continue the theme of the World Heritage Series of paper banknotes, introduced in autumn 2009. The new notes each depict a different notable Scot on the front and on the reverse bear an illustration of one of Scotland's UNESCO World Heritage Sites.

Banknotes of the earlier Famous Scots Series portray notable Scottish historical people along with items and locations associated with them.

The Clydesdale Bank also occasionally issues special-edition banknotes, such as a £10 note celebrating the bank's sponsorship of the Scotland team at the 2006 Commonwealth Games.

Following the announcement of the CYBG's takeover of Virgin Money in 2018 and planned phasing-out of the Clydesdale Bank brand by 2021 in favour of Virgin Money, there was uncertainty as to the future of the Clydesdale Bank's banknotes after 2021. In June 2019, the company confirmed that it would continue to issue notes under the Clydesdale Bank name and clarified there would be no change to the design, despite reports that Sir Richard Branson's face would be added to them. However, they became rarer from 2020 after the bank withdrew from contracts to supply cash machines run by rival lenders, meaning they could no longer be withdrawn from Santander, TSB, Co-op or Asda machines.

Clydesdale Bank banknotes
Denomination	Obverse	Reverse	Additional information
Polymer Series (2015 onwards)
£5	Sir William Arrol	Vignette of the Forth Bridge	In circulation
£10	Robert Burns	Vignette of Edinburgh Old and New Towns	In circulation
£20	King Robert the Bruce	Vignette of St Kilda	In circulation

Former Clydesdale Bank banknotes, all withdrawn
Denomination	Obverse	Reverse	Additional information
World Heritage Series (2009)
£5	Sir Alexander Fleming	Vignette of St Kilda	
£10	Robert Burns	Vignette of Edinburgh Old and New Towns	
£20	King Robert the Bruce	Vignette of New Lanark	
£50	Elsie Inglis	Vignette of the Antonine Wall	
£100	Charles Rennie Mackintosh	Vignette of Neolithic Orkney	
Famous Scots Series
£5	Robert Burns	Vignette of a field mouse from Burns' poem To a Mouse	
£10	Mary Slessor	Vignette of a map of Calabar, Nigeria, and African missionary scenes	
£20	King Robert the Bruce	Vignette of the Bruce on horseback with the Monymusk Reliquary against a background of Stirling Castle	
£50	Adam Smith	Vignette of industrial tools against a background of sailing ships	
£100	Lord Kelvin	Vignette of the University of Glasgow	

== See also ==
- Banknotes of the pound sterling
- Banknotes of Northern Ireland
- People on Scottish banknotes
- Scottish coinage
- Pound Scots, the currency of Scotland prior to the Acts of Union 1707. It did not use banknotes.
