= Scottish pound =

Scottish pound may refer to:

- Banknotes of Scotland, banknotes of the pound sterling (GBP) issued by one of three Scottish banks
- Pound Scots, the former currency of Scotland until the Acts of Union 1707
- Scottish independence § Currency, hypothetical currency should Scotland become independent
