= The Royal Bank of Scotland £1 note =

Scottish banknote

One pound
(United Kingdom)
- Value: £1 sterling
- Width: 128 mm
- Height: 65 mm
- Security features: Raised print, metallic thread, watermark, microlettering, see-through registration device, UV feature
- Material used: Cotton
- Years of printing: 1727–2001; 1987–2001 (current design)

Obverse
- Design: Lord Ilay
- Design date: 1987

Reverse
- Design: Edinburgh Castle
- Design date: 1987

The Royal Bank of Scotland £1 note is a sterling banknote. The current cotton note, first issued in 1987, bears an image of Lord Ilay, one of the founders of the bank, on the obverse, and a vignette of Edinburgh Castle on the reverse.

The £1 note is currently the smallest denomination of banknote issued by The Royal Bank of Scotland. The bank ceased regular production of £1 notes in 2001; the denomination is still legal currency and remains in circulation, although it has rarely been seen in cash transactions since about 2006.

== History ==
In common with a number of other banks in Scotland, the Royal Bank of Scotland has retained the right to issue its own banknotes. It first issued notes in 1727, the same year the bank was founded. The issuing of banknotes by Scottish banks was formerly regulated by the Banknote (Scotland) Act 1845 until it was superseded by the Banking Act 2009. Scottish banknotes are legal currency throughout the United Kingdom, though they are not legal tender. Scottish banknotes are accepted in other countries of the United Kingdom, and holders have the same level of protection in law as those holding Bank of England notes.

In 1727, the Royal Bank of Scotland began issuing twenty-shilling notes (equivalent to £1). Early banknotes were monochrome, and printed on one side only. The first twenty-shilling notes were dated 8 December 1727 and were hand-signed by a bank cashier and given a unique number. The cashier also added by hand the equivalent value in old Scots pounds — a currency that had been abolished 20 years earlier in the Acts of Union 1707 which united the Kingdoms of England and Scotland into the Kingdom of Great Britain. Twenty shillings was equivalent to £12 Scots. The bank continued the custom of including the value in old Scots pounds until 1792 to encourage acceptance of its banknotes. This series of banknotes was also the first British banknote to have a royal portrait, as they featured a vignette of King George II, who had ascended to the British throne earlier that year. At the time, printing portraits was a difficult and expensive process, and including a likeness of the King served as an effective anti-counterfeiting device. The banknotes were held at the bank in bound bundles, similar to modern cheque books. When issued, the cashier would cut the note out with a wavy line; when the note was later presented for payment, a bank clerk would verify that the note was not a counterfeit note by comparing the cut edge of the note against the shape of the counterfoil and also by checking that the serial number on the note and the counterfoil concurred.

The Royal Bank's 1826 issue of the £1 note displayed much more intricate detail as printing processes were improved by the introduction of steel plates, and it the first British banknote to be printed on both sides. This issue featured a portrait of King George IV, and this was the last standard-issue Royal Bank of Scotland banknote to depict a reigning monarch. It was also issued after the controversy of the Bankers (Scotland) Act 1826, in which the British government attempted unsuccessfully to prohibit the issue of low-value banknotes.

The Royal Bank of Scotland's 1832 issue of £1 notes established the design for all the bank's £1 note issues for 136 years. It featured the bank's name surmounted by the Royal Arms of Scotland, in which the heraldic supporters of The Lion and the Unicorn flanked a portrait of King George I, commemorating his royal assent for the formation of the bank in 1727. The note also featured illustrations of the allegorical figures of Britannia, looking out over the seas, and Plenty, holding a cornucopia. This design remained unchanged until 1968, with only minor alterations.

In 1968, the Royal Bank's £1 note design underwent its first major change to match the 1966 £5 note issue. For the first time, Royal Bank notes no longer bore a royal portrait; instead, they bore an illustration of the industrialist David Dale, who had been a joint cashier of the bank's first Glasgow office. It was also the Royal Bank's first full-colour note, and bore the bank's coat of arms and included a steel security strip.

The Dale Series was short-lived; in 1969, the National Commercial Bank of Scotland merged with The Royal Bank of Scotland, and a new Interim series of notes was issued, combining designs of the banknotes from the two institutions. These notes were the first Royal Bank notes to conform to the banknote colour conventions across the UK, so that all £1 notes were coloured green. The front of the note featured the coat of arms of the Royal Bank of Scotland, and on the reverse was an illustration of the Forth Road Bridge.

In 1987, the Royal Bank issued its Ilay series of banknotes, named after Lord Ilay, first governor of the bank, whose portrait appears on the front of all the notes. The illustration is based on a 1744 portrait painting of Lord Ilay by Allan Ramsay. Other common design elements include the bank's coat of arms and logo, the facade of Dundas House, the bank's headquarters in Edinburgh, a pattern representing the ceiling of the headquarters' banking hall, and an image of Lord Ilay as watermark. All of the Ilay series notes feature a castle on the back. On the reverse of the £1 note is an image of Edinburgh Castle and the National Gallery of Scotland.

£1 notes are now rarely used. The Royal Bank was the last bank in Scotland to issue £1 notes, and stopped production in 2001. In 2015, a new series of polymer banknote was introduced by the Royal Bank, replacing its Ilay series £5 and £10 notes.

== Designs ==
| Note | First issued | Colour | Size | Design | Additional information |
|---|---|---|---|---|---|
| George II | 1727 | Black | | King George II | Value of twenty shillings |
| George IV | 1826 | Black | | King George IV | |
| George I | 1832 | Black | | King George I | |
| Dale | 1968 | Green | | Front: David Dale; Back: Dundas House | |
| Interim | 1968 | Green | | Front:Royal Bank coat of arms; Back: Forth Road Bridge | |
| Ilay | 1987 | Green | 128 × 65 mm | Front: Lord Ilay; Back: Edinburgh Castle | |

Information taken from The Committee of Scottish Bankers website.

Design elements on the Ilay Series £1 note

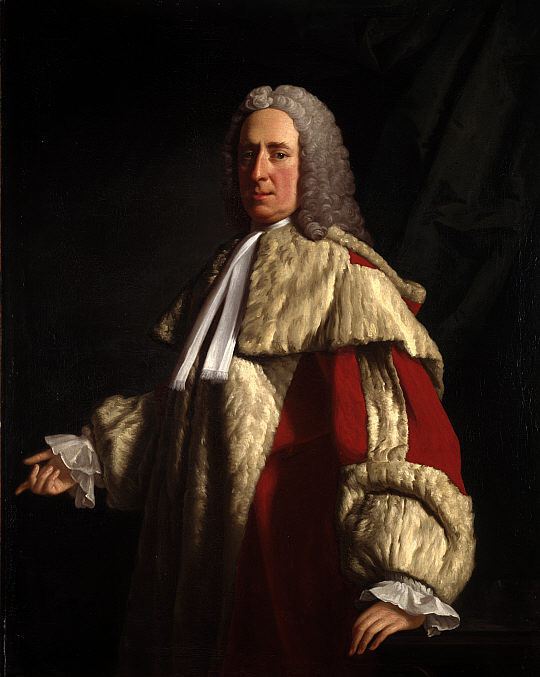
Lord Ilay portrait (Allan Ramsay, 1744)

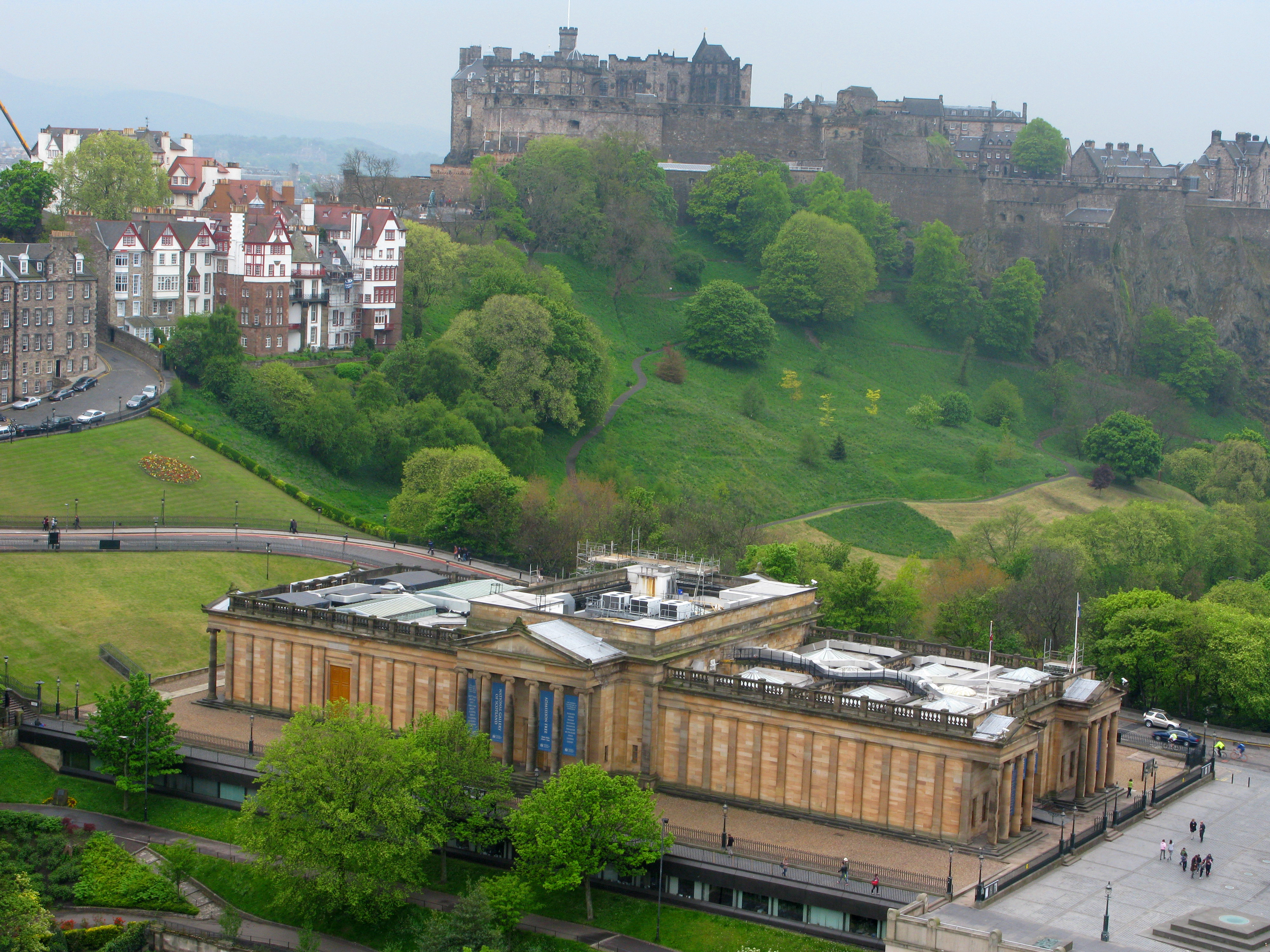
Edinburgh Castle and the National Gallery

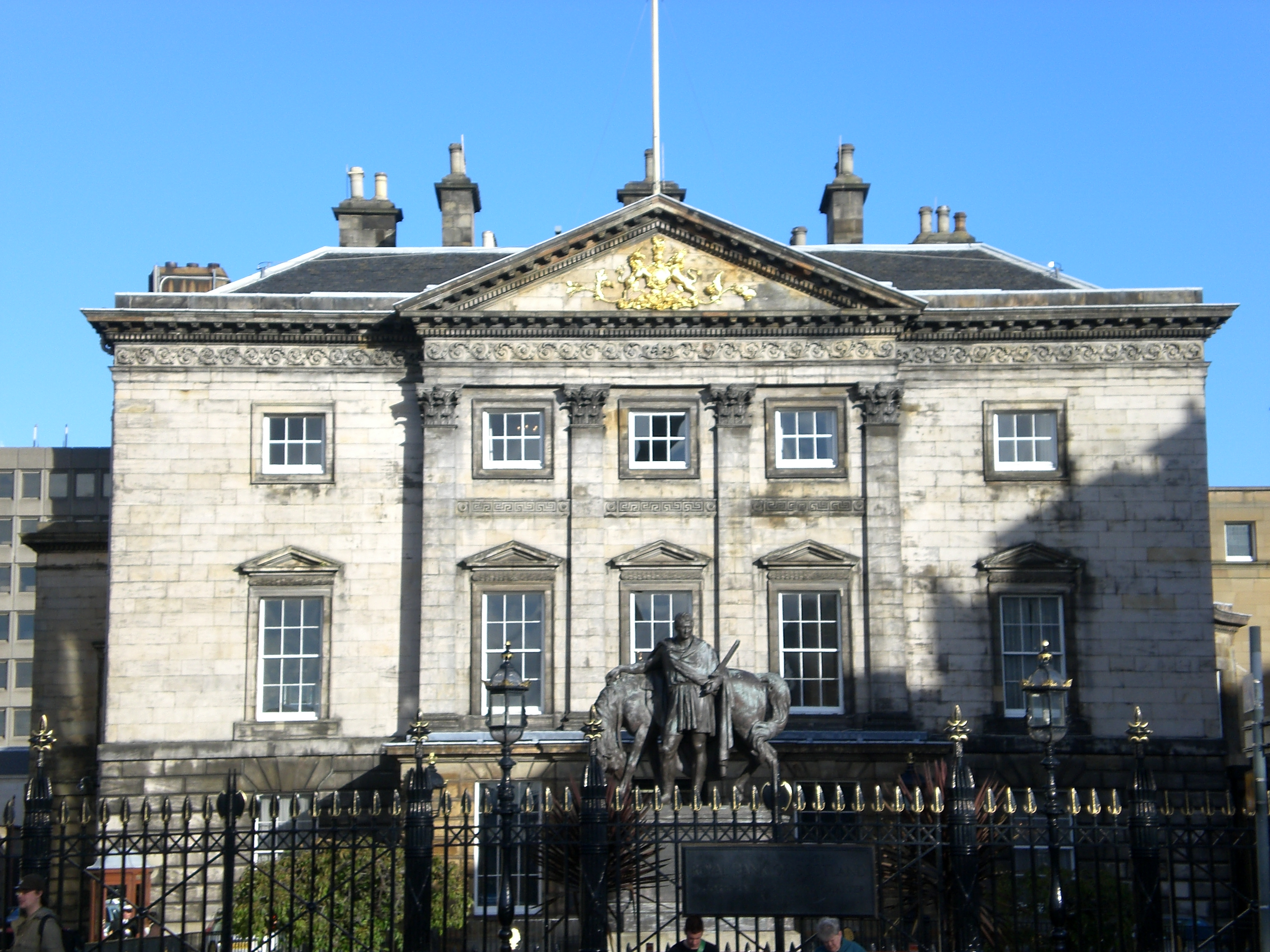
Dundas House, Edinburgh

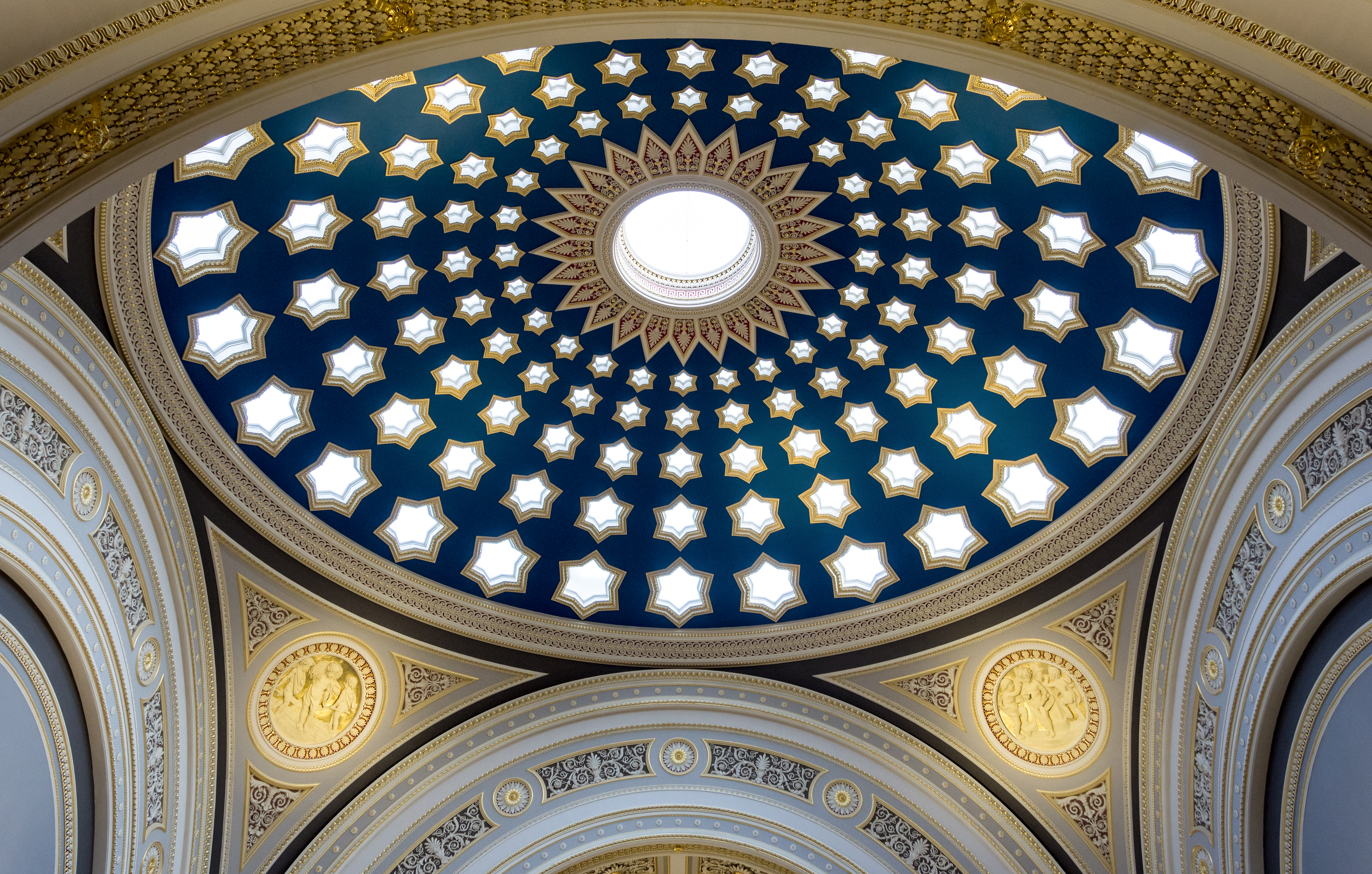
Banking hall ceiling

=== Commemorative £1 notes ===
In 1992, The Royal Bank of Scotland issued the first special commemorative banknote in Britain and in Europe. The first commemorative £1 note was issued to mark the European Council Summit that was held in Edinburgh on 8 December 1992. Since then, the Royal Bank has issued a number of commemorative banknotes, including £1 notes, to mark major national events or anniversaries.

| Date of issue | Commemoration | Colour | Design | Additional information |
|---|---|---|---|---|
| 1992 | European Summit | Green | Palace of Holyroodhouse and the European flag | Europe's first commemorative banknote |
| 1994 | Centenary of the death of Robert Louis Stevenson | Green | Portrait of Stevenson; a montage of characters and scenes from his books; Stevenson's homes in Edinburgh and on Samoa | |
| 1997 | 150th anniversary of the birth of Alexander Graham Bell | Purple | Montage of telephones, geese, sheep and the phonetic alphabet invented by his father | The first banknote in the EU to feature a hologram |
| 1999 | Inauguration of the Scottish Parliament | Purple | General Assembly Hall of the Church of Scotland (temporary home of the Parliament); plan of Enric Miralles's new Scottish Parliament Building (as yet unbuilt) | |
