= Kerri Andrews =

British non-fiction writer and editor

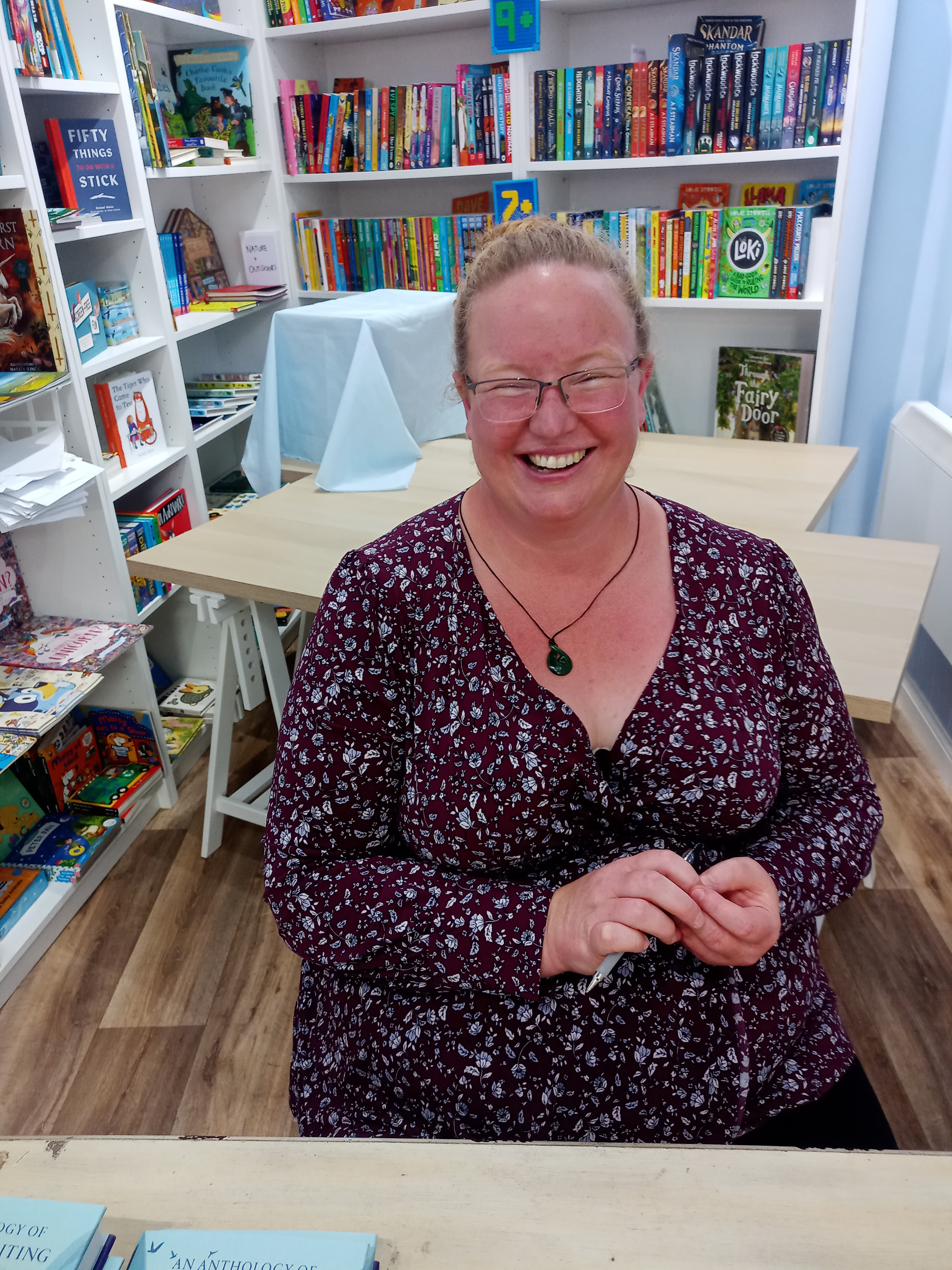
Kerri Andrews in Jedburgh book shop in 2023

Kerri Louise Andrews is a non-fiction writer and editor specialising in women's experiences of walking. She is a former reader in women's literature and textual editing at Edge Hill University. She was a elected a Fellow of the Royal Historical Society in May 2025.

== Early life and education ==
Andrews is from Worcestershire and moved to Scotland in the 2010s. She has an undergraduate degree from Loughborough University and a master's and doctorate from the University of Leeds. Her thesis title was "Patronage and professionalism in the writings of Hannah More, Charlotte Smith and Ann Yearsley, 1770-1806".

== Writings ==
Andrews' book Wanderers: A history of women walking was published in 2020 (Reaktion Books, ISBN 978-1-78914-501-4) and discusses ten women writers who walked, and wrote about their walking, from the 18th to the 21st centuries; it has a foreword by poet Kathleen Jamie. The subjects of Wanderers are: Elizabeth Carter, Dorothy Wordsworth, Ellen Weeton, Sarah Stoddart Hazlitt, Harriet Martineau, Virginia Woolf, Nan Shepherd, Anaïs Nin, Cheryl Strayed and Linda Cracknell (the chapters are in this, chronological, sequence). Andrews chose writers who "actively reflected on their pedestrianism, or who found in their walking something that contributed to their understanding of themselves as authors and as people".

Andrews edited the correspondence of Nan Shepherd, a pioneer woman mountain walker, which was published by Edinburgh University Press in 2023.

Her anthology Way Makers: An Anthology of Women's Writing about Walking, was published in 2023 and is the first anthology of this kind. The earliest piece is a letter from Elizabeth Carter in 1746, recording that "My general practice about six is to take up my stick and walk".

Her Pathfinding: On Walking, Motherhood and Freedom was published in 2025. The reviewer for The Great Outdoors Magazine concluded that "If you feel like you've lost your way, amid the mountain narrative, Pathfinding may help you to place yourself once again." As of May 2025 she is working on a project about Isobel Wylie Hutchison (1889-1982), a Scottish Arctic traveller, and writing a book about the history of walking in Scotland.

Andrews has also written for The Guardian and other publications, and has appeared on BBC Radio 4's Costing the Earth, a special edition of Woman's Hour about walking, and BBC Radio Scotland's Scotland Outdoors.

== Personal life ==
Andrews is married and has two children. She lives in the Scottish borders, and has climbed more than 120 of the 282 Munros. She has haemochromatosis, a chronic condition which leads to an excess of iron in the body, which was only diagnosed after she had repeatedly been told that there was nothing wrong with her.

== Selected publications ==
=== On walking ===
==== Books ====
- Andrews, Kerri (2025). Pathfinding: On Walking, Motherhood and Freedom (1st ed.). London: Elliott & Thompson, Limited. ISBN 9781783968428.
- Shepherd, Nan (2023). Andrews, Kerri (ed.). Nan Shepherd's correspondence, 1920-1980. Edinburgh: Edinburgh University Press. ISBN 9781474487573.
- Andrews, Kerri, ed. (2023). Way makers: an anthology of women's writing about walking. London: Reaktion books. ISBN 9781789147872.
- Andrews, Kerri (2020). Wanderers: a history of women walking. London: Reaktion Books. ISBN 978-1789143423.

==== Chapters and articles ====
- Andrews, Kerri (2023). "Climbing Against Gravity: on Mountain Climbing and Genetic Haemachromatosis". In Kenward, Louise (ed.). Moving Mountains: Writing Nature through Illness and Disability. Footnote Press. ISBN 978-1-80444-055-1.
- Andrews, Kerri (2021). "Women's Walking Tours and Romantic Wilderness". Wordsworth Circle. 52 (3): 342–357. doi:10.1086/714908.
- Andrews, Kerri (2023). "'That is the lady I saw ascending Snowdon, alone': pioneering women mountaineers of the nineteenth century". In Hall, Jenny; Boocock, Emma; Avner, Zoe (eds.). Gender, Politics and Change in Mountaineering: Moving Mountains (1st ed.). Cham: Springer International Publishing AG. pp. 15–30. ISBN 978-3-031-29944-5.
- Andrews, Kerri (1 December 2021). "'"Learning the Lakes: Harriet Martineau's A Complete Guide to the English Lakes and Pedestrian Authority'". Romanticism. 27 (1): 99–108. doi:10.3366/rom.2021.0495. ISSN 1354-991X.

=== Other works ===
==== Books ====
- Andrews, Kerri; Edney, Sue, eds. (2022). Hannah More in context. New York, NY: Routledge. ISBN 9781003092971.
- Yearsley, Ann (2014). Andrews, Kerri; Fulford, Tim; Keegan, Bridget (eds.). The collected works of Ann Yearsley. London: Pickering & Chatto. ISBN 9781851966387.
- Andrews, Kerri (2013). Ann Yearsley and Hannah More, patronage and poetry: the story of a literary relationship. London: Pickering & Chatto. ISBN 978-1848931510.

==== Chapters and articles ====
- Andrews, Kerri (2022). "'Hunger is not a postponable want': Hannah More's charity reconsidered". In Andrews, Kerri; Edney, Sue (eds.). Hannah More in Context. Routledge. pp. 84–99. ISBN 978-0-367-55320-3.
- Andrews, Kerri (2017). "Neither Mute nor Inglorious: Ann Yearsley and Elegy". In Goodridge, John; Keegan, Bridget (eds.). A History of British Working-Class Literature. Cambridge University Press. pp. 85–100. ISBN 978-1-107-19040-5.
- Andrews, Kerri (2015). "Ann Yearsley and the London newspapers in 1787". Tulsa Studies in Women's Literature. 34 (1): 107–124. ISSN 0732-7730.
- Andrews, Kerri (2015). "In Her Place: Ann Yearsley or 'The Bristol Milkwoman'". Literary Bristol. Redcliffe Press. pp. 83–104. ISBN 978-1-908326-73-7.
