= The Royal Bank of Scotland £100 note =

One hundred pounds
- Country: United Kingdom
- Value: £100
- Width: 169 mm
- Height: 95 mm
- Security features: Raised print, metallic thread, watermark, microlettering, see-through registration device, UV feature
- Material used: Cotton
- Years of printing: 1727–present 1987–2007 (current design)

Obverse
- Design: Lord Ilay
- Design date: 1987

Reverse
- Design: Balmoral Castle
- Design date: 1987

The Royal Bank of Scotland £100 note is a banknote of the pound sterling. It is the largest denomination of banknote issued by The Royal Bank of Scotland. The current cotton note, first issued in 1987 bears an image of Lord Ilay, one of the founders of the bank, on the obverse and a vignette of Balmoral Castle on the reverse.

== History ==
The Royal Bank of Scotland began issuing £100 notes in 1727, the same year as the bank's founding. Early banknotes were monochrome, and printed on one side only. The issuing of banknotes by Scottish banks was regulated by the Banknote (Scotland) Act 1845 until it was superseded by the Banking Act 2009. Though strictly not legal tender in Scotland, Scottish banknotes are nevertheless legal currency and are generally accepted throughout the United Kingdom. Scottish banknotes are fully backed such that holders have the same level of protection as those holding genuine Bank of England notes. The £100 note is currently the largest denomination of banknote issued by The Royal Bank of Scotland.

The current Ilay series of banknotes was first issued in 1987. These banknotes feature a portrait of Lord Ilay, first governor of the bank, on the front. Lord Ilay's image is also used as a watermark on the notes. Other design elements include the bank's coat of arms and logo, the facade of Dundas House, the bank's headquarters in Edinburgh, and a pattern representing the ceiling of the headquarters' banking hall. All of the Ilay series notes feature a castle on the back. On the reverse of the £100 note is an image of Balmoral Castle.

== Designs ==
Note	First issued	Colour	Size	Design	Additional information
Ilay	1987	Crimson	169 × 95 mm	Front: Lord Ilay; Back: Balmoral Castle	Withdrawn 29th September 2023

Information taken from The Committee of Scottish Bankers website.

Design elements on the Ilay Series £100 note

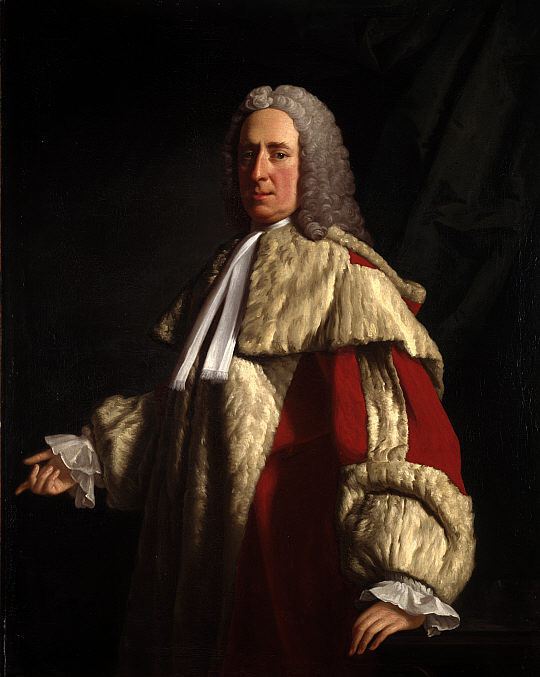
Lord Ilay portrait (Allan Ramsay, 1744)

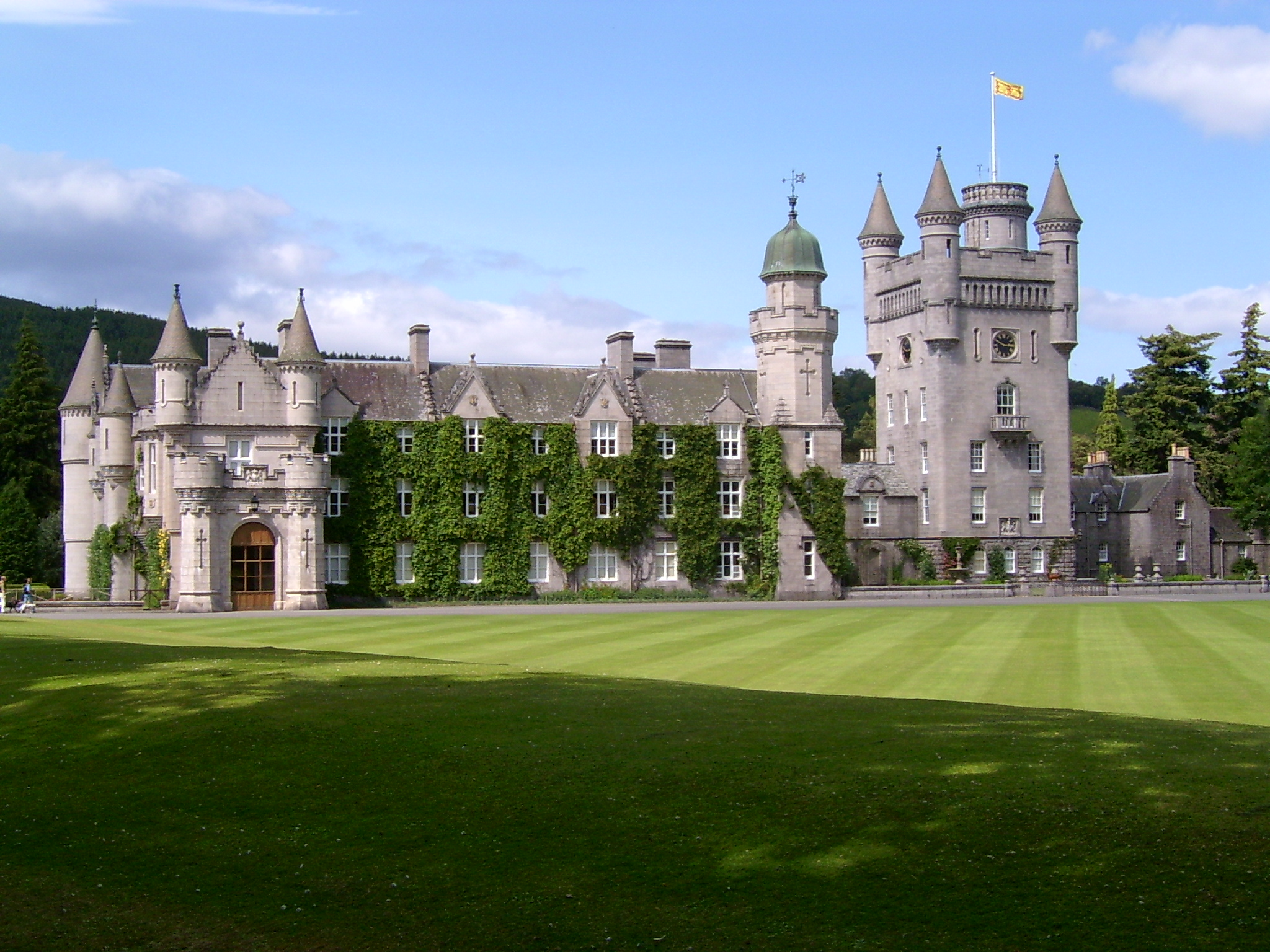
Balmoral Castle

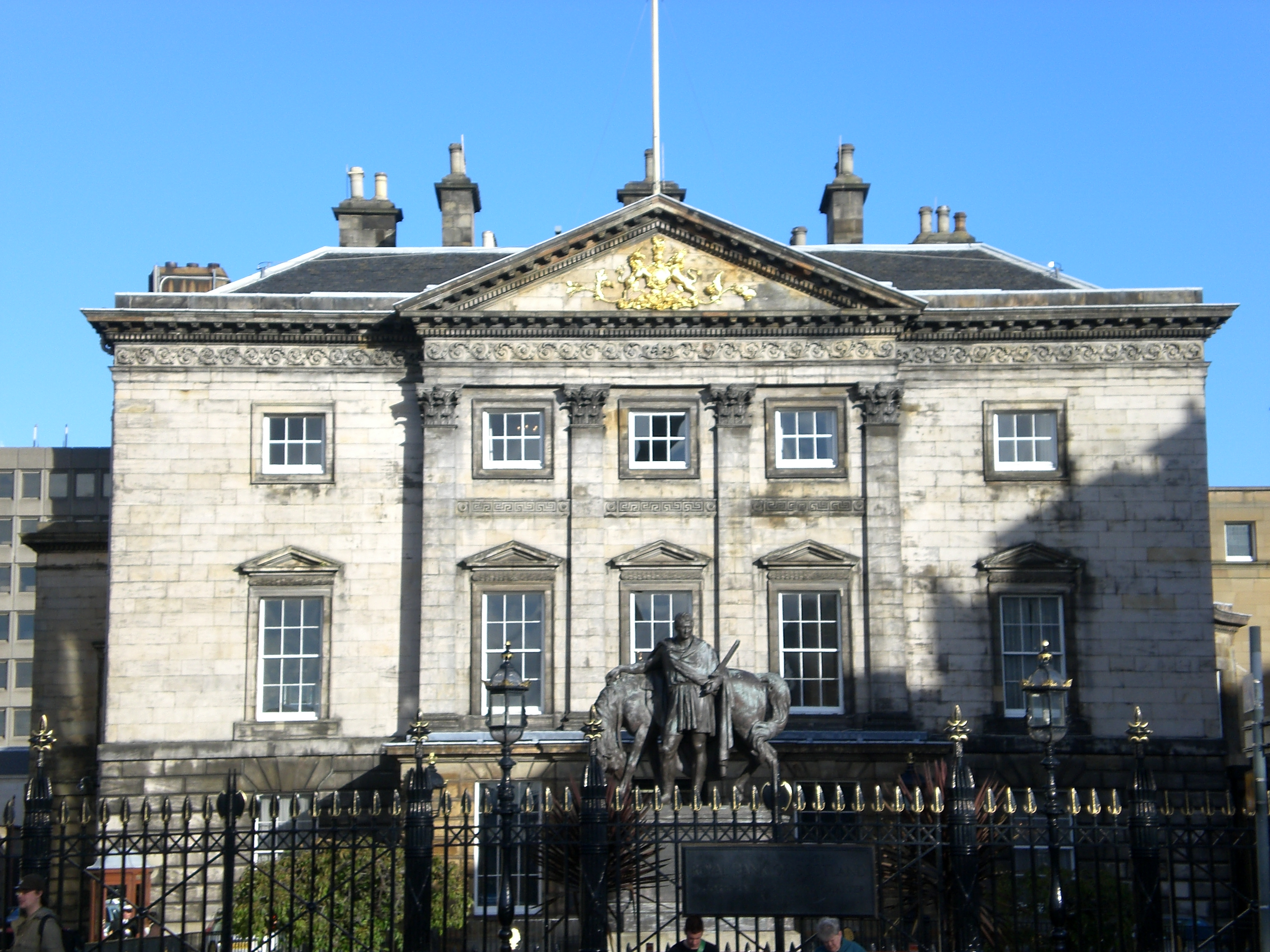
Dundas House, Edinburgh

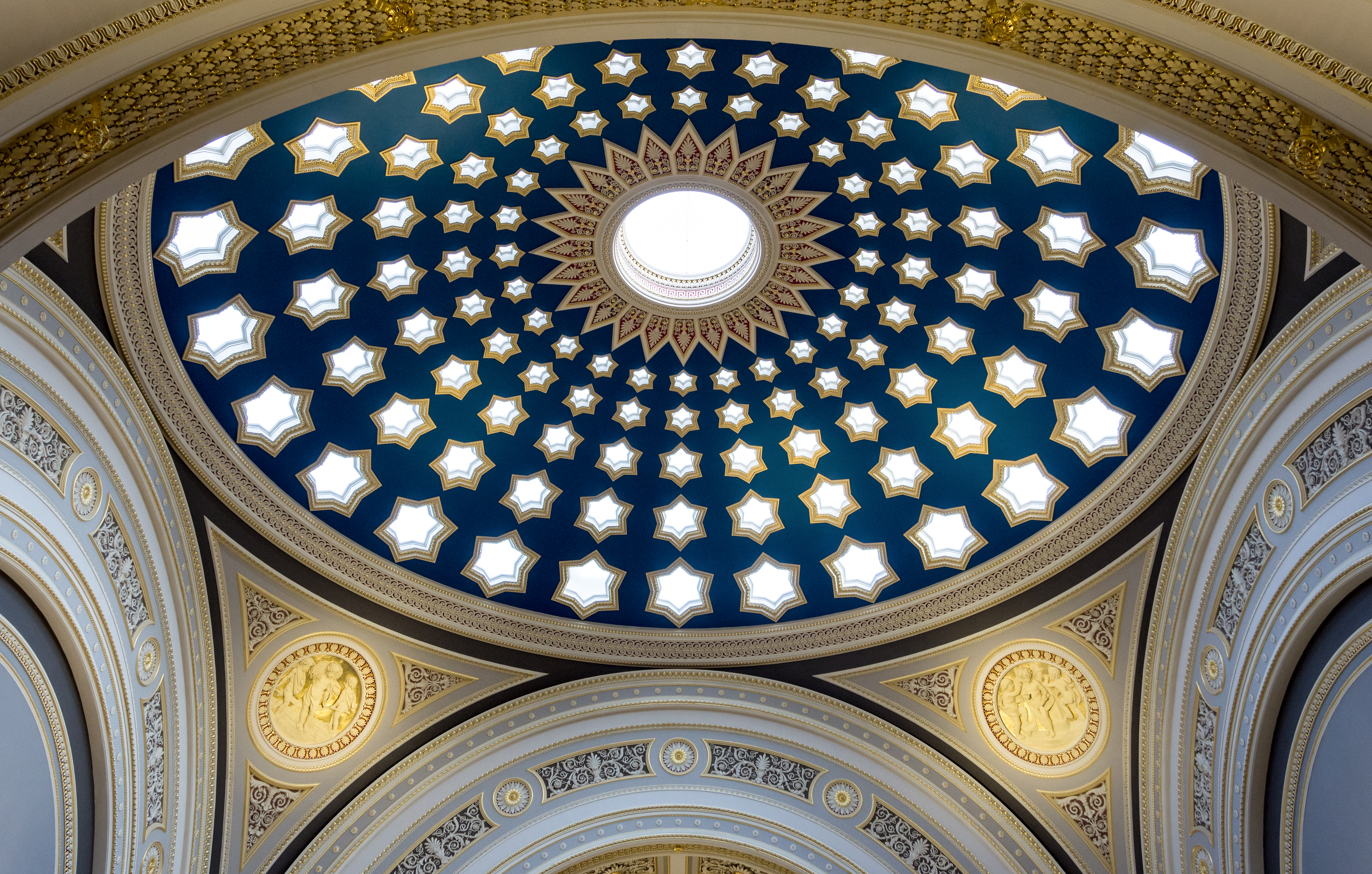
Banking hall ceiling
