= The Royal Bank of Scotland £50 note =

Fifty pounds
- Country: United Kingdom
- Value: £50 sterling
- Width: 146 mm
- Height: 77 mm
- Security features: Holographic patch, Raised print, metallic security thread, watermark, microlettering, see-through registration device, UV feature
- Material used: Polymer
- Years of printing: 1727, 2005–present 2021–present (current design)

Obverse
- Design: Flora Stevenson
- Design date: 2021

Reverse
- Design: Two ospreys, a mackerel, lady's bedstraw
- Design date: 2021

The Royal Bank of Scotland £50 note is a sterling banknote. It is the second largest denomination of banknote issued by the Royal Bank of Scotland. The current polymer note, first issued in 2021 bears an image of Flora Stevenson on the obverse and two ospreys, a mackerel and lady's bedstraw on the reverse.

== History ==
The Royal Bank of Scotland began issuing £50 notes in 1727, the same year as the bank's founding. Early banknotes were monochrome, and printed on one side only. The issuing of banknotes by Scottish banks was regulated by the Banknote (Scotland) Act 1845 until it was superseded by the Banking Act 2009. Though strictly not legal tender in Scotland, Scottish banknotes are nevertheless legal currency and are generally accepted throughout the United Kingdom. Scottish banknotes are fully backed such that holders have the same level of protection as those holding genuine Bank of England notes. The £50 note is currently the second largest denomination of banknote issued by The Royal Bank of Scotland.

The current Ilay series of banknotes was first issued in 1987, although it did not originally include the £50 note. The £50 note was added to the Ilay series in 2005, and these notes were the first £50 notes issued by the bank since 1727. These banknotes feature a portrait of Lord Ilay, first governor of the bank, on the front. Lord Ilay's image is also used as a watermark on the notes. Other design elements include the bank's coat of arms and logo, the facade of Dundas House, the bank's headquarters in Edinburgh, and a pattern representing the ceiling of the headquarters' banking hall. All of the Ilay series notes feature a castle on the back. On the reverse of the £50 note is an image of Inverness Castle.

On 18 August 2021, a new polymer £50 note was introduced to replace the paper notes, featuring Flora Stevenson. Unlike the paper note, it is red instead of green.

== Designs ==
Note	First issued	Colour	Size	Design	Additional information
Ilay	2005	Green	156 × 85 mm	Front: Lord Ilay; Back: Inverness Castle	Withdrawn 30th September 2022
Polymer	2021	Red	146 x 77 mm	Front: Flora Stevenson; Back: Two ospreys, a mackerel, lady's bedstraw	

Information taken from The Committee of Scottish Bankers website.
