= The Royal Bank of Scotland £20 note =

Twenty pounds
- Country: United Kingdom
- Value: £20 sterling
- Width: 139 mm
- Height: 73 mm
- Security features: Raised print, metallic thread, watermark, microlettering, see-through registration device, UV feature
- Material used: Polymer
- Years of printing: 1727–present 2020–present (current design)

Obverse
- Design: Catherine Cranston
- Design date: 2020

Reverse
- Design: Red Squirrels
- Design date: 2020

The Royal Bank of Scotland £20 note is a sterling banknote. It is the third largest denomination of banknote issued by The Royal Bank of Scotland. The current polymer note, first issued in 2020, bears the image of Catherine Cranston on the obverse and a vignette depicting a pair of Red Squirrels on the reverse.

== History ==
The Royal Bank of Scotland began issuing £20 notes in 1727, the same year as the bank's founding. Early banknotes were monochrome, and printed on one side only. The issuing of banknotes by Scottish banks was regulated by the Banknote (Scotland) Act 1845 until it was superseded by the Banking Act 2009. Though strictly not legal tender in Scotland, Scottish banknotes are nevertheless legal currency and are generally accepted throughout the United Kingdom. Scottish banknotes are fully backed such that holders have the same level of protection as those holding genuine Bank of England notes. The £20 note is currently the third largest denomination of banknote issued by The Royal Bank of Scotland.

The Ilay series of banknotes was first issued in 1987. These banknotes feature a portrait of Lord Ilay, first governor of the bank, on the front. Lord Ilay's image is also used as a watermark on the notes. Other design elements include the bank's coat of arms and logo, the facade of Dundas House, the bank's headquarters in Edinburgh, and a pattern representing the ceiling of the headquarters' banking hall. All of the Ilay series notes feature a castle on the back. On the reverse of the £20 note is an image of Brodick Castle.

On 5 March 2020, a new polymer £20 note was introduced showing the tea room entrepreneur Catherine Cranston in place of Lord Ilay.

== Designs ==
Note	First issued	Colour	Size	Design	Additional information
Ilay	1987	Purple	14 × 80 mm	Front: Lord Ilay; Back: Brodick Castle	Withdrawn 30th September 2022
Polymer	5 March 2020	Purple	139 × 73 mm	Front: Catherine Cranston; Back: Red Squirrels	

Information taken from The Committee of Scottish Bankers website.
