= The Royal Bank of Scotland £5 note =

Sterling banknote

Five pounds
- Country: United Kingdom
- Value: £5 sterling
- Width: 125 mm
- Height: 65 mm
- Security features: See-through window, raised print, security thread, image transition, UV fluorescence, microlettering
- Material used: Polymer
- Years of printing: 1727–present 2016–present (current design)

Obverse
- Design: Nan Shepherd
- Design date: 2016

Reverse
- Design: Two mackerel
- Design date: 2016

The Royal Bank of Scotland £5 note, also known as a fiver, is a sterling banknote. It is the second smallest denomination of banknote issued by The Royal Bank of Scotland. The current polymer note, first issued in 2016, bears an image of author Nan Shepherd on the obverse and a pair of mackerel on the reverse.

== History ==
The Royal Bank of Scotland began issuing £5 notes in 1727, the same year as the bank's founding. Early banknotes were monochrome, and printed on one side only. The issuing of banknotes by Scottish banks was regulated by the Banknote (Scotland) Act 1845 until it was superseded by the Banking Act 2009. Though strictly not legal tender in Scotland, Scottish banknotes are nevertheless legal currency and are generally accepted throughout the United Kingdom. Scottish banknotes are fully backed such that holders have the same level of protection as those holding genuine Bank of England notes. The £5 note is currently the second smallest denomination of banknote issued by The Royal Bank of Scotland.

Scottish banknotes are not withdrawn in the same manner as Bank of England notes, and therefore several different versions of the Royal Bank of Scotland five pound note may be encountered, although the Committee of Scottish Bankers encouraged the public to spend or exchange older, non-polymer five pound notes before 1 March 2018.

The Ilay series of banknotes was first issued in 1987. These banknotes feature a portrait of Lord Ilay, first governor of the bank, on the front. Lord Ilay's image is also used as a watermark on the notes. Other design elements include the bank's coat of arms and logo, the facade of Dundas House, the bank's headquarters in Edinburgh, and a pattern representing the ceiling of the headquarters' banking hall. All of the Ilay series notes feature a castle on the back. On the reverse of the £5 note is an image of Culzean Castle. Other versions of the £5 note have been produced since the introduction of the Ilay series to commemorate certain events, including the Queen's Golden Jubilee, the 250th anniversary of the Royal and Ancient Golf Club, the 400th anniversary of the Royal College of Surgeons of Edinburgh, and a celebration of the career of American golfer Jack Nicklaus.

In 2015 it was announced that a new polymer £5 note would be issued in the second half of 2016. The new design was unveiled in April 2016, and features a portrait of author Nan Shepherd on the front. Alongside the portrait is an image of the Cairngorms, as well as a quote from Shepherd's book The Living Mountain. The rear of the note bears an image of two mackerel alongside an excerpt from Sorley MacLean's poem The Choice.

== Designs ==
Note	First issued	Colour	Size	Design	Additional information
Ilay	1987	Blue	135 × 70 mm	Front: Lord Ilay; Back: Culzen Castle	Withdrawn 1st March 2018
Polymer	2016	Blue	125 × 65 mm	Front: Nan Shepherd; Back: Two mackerel	

Information taken from The Committee of Scottish Bankers website.
