= Royal Bank of Scotland =

Scottish bank

The Royal Bank of Scotland plc

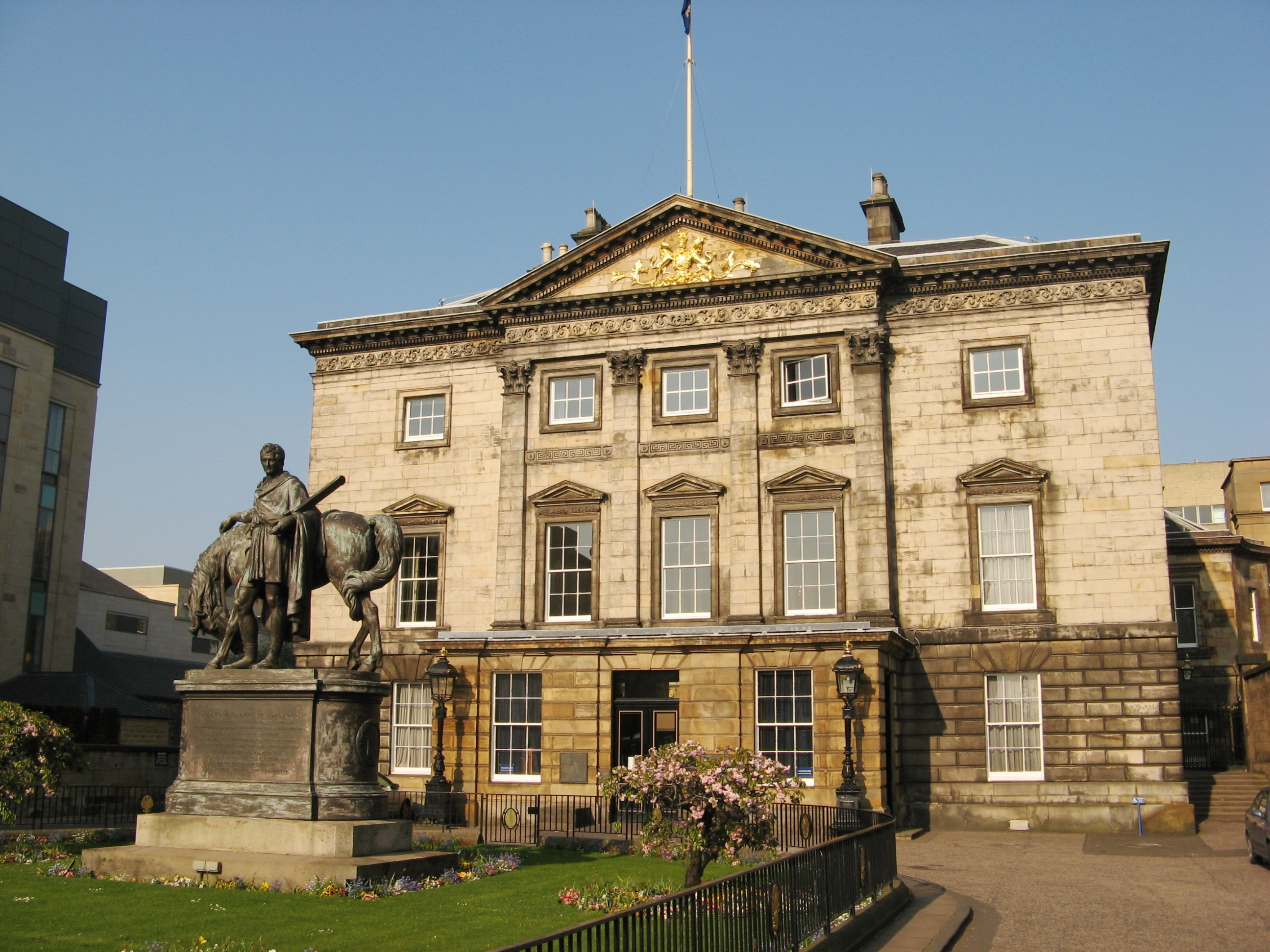
- Dundas House in Edinburgh, built in 1774, acquired by the Royal Bank of Scotland in 1821 and still its registered office
- Native name: Scottish Gaelic: Banca Rìoghail na h-Alba
- Type: Private
- Industry: Financial services
- Founded: 31 May 1727; 299 years ago
- Headquarters: Edinburgh, Scotland
- Key people: Paul Thwaite (CEO); Rick Haythorntwaite (chairman)
- Services: Consumer banking; Corporate banking; Finance and insurance
- Owner: NatWest Holdings
- Number of employees: 71,200
- Parent: NatWest Group
- Website: rbs.co.uk

The Royal Bank of Scotland plc (Scottish Gaelic: Banca Rìoghail na h-Alba), is a major retail and commercial bank based in Edinburgh, Scotland. It is one of the retail banking subsidiaries of NatWest Group (formerly known as The Royal Bank of Scotland Group), together with NatWest and Ulster Bank. The Royal Bank of Scotland has 62 branches in Scotland. The bank is completely separate from the fellow Edinburgh-based bank, the Bank of Scotland, which pre-dates the Royal Bank by 32 years. The Royal Bank of Scotland was established to provide a bank with strong Hanoverian and Whig ties.

Following ringfencing of the Group's core domestic business, the bank became a direct subsidiary of NatWest Holdings in 2019. NatWest Markets comprises the Group's investment banking arm. To give it legal form, the former RBS entity was renamed NatWest Markets in 2018; at the same time Adam and Company (which held a separate PRA banking licence) was renamed The Royal Bank of Scotland, with Adam and Company continuing as an RBS private banking brand until 2022.

== History ==
=== Foundation ===
The bank traces its origin to the Society of the Subscribed Equivalent Debt, which was set up by investors in the failed Company of Scotland to protect the compensation they received as part of the arrangements of the 1707 Acts of Union. The "Equivalent Society" became the "Equivalent Company" on 21 November 1724, and the new company wished to move into banking. The British government received the request favourably as the "Old Bank", the Bank of Scotland, was suspected of having Jacobite sympathies. Accordingly, the "New Bank" was chartered on 31 May 1727 as the Royal Bank of Scotland, with Archibald Campbell, Lord Ilay, appointed its first governor.

On 31 May 1728, the Royal Bank of Scotland invented the overdraft, which was later considered an innovation in modern banking. It allowed William Hogg, a merchant in the High Street of Edinburgh, access to £1,000 (£155,919 in today's value) credit.

=== Competition with the Bank of Scotland ===
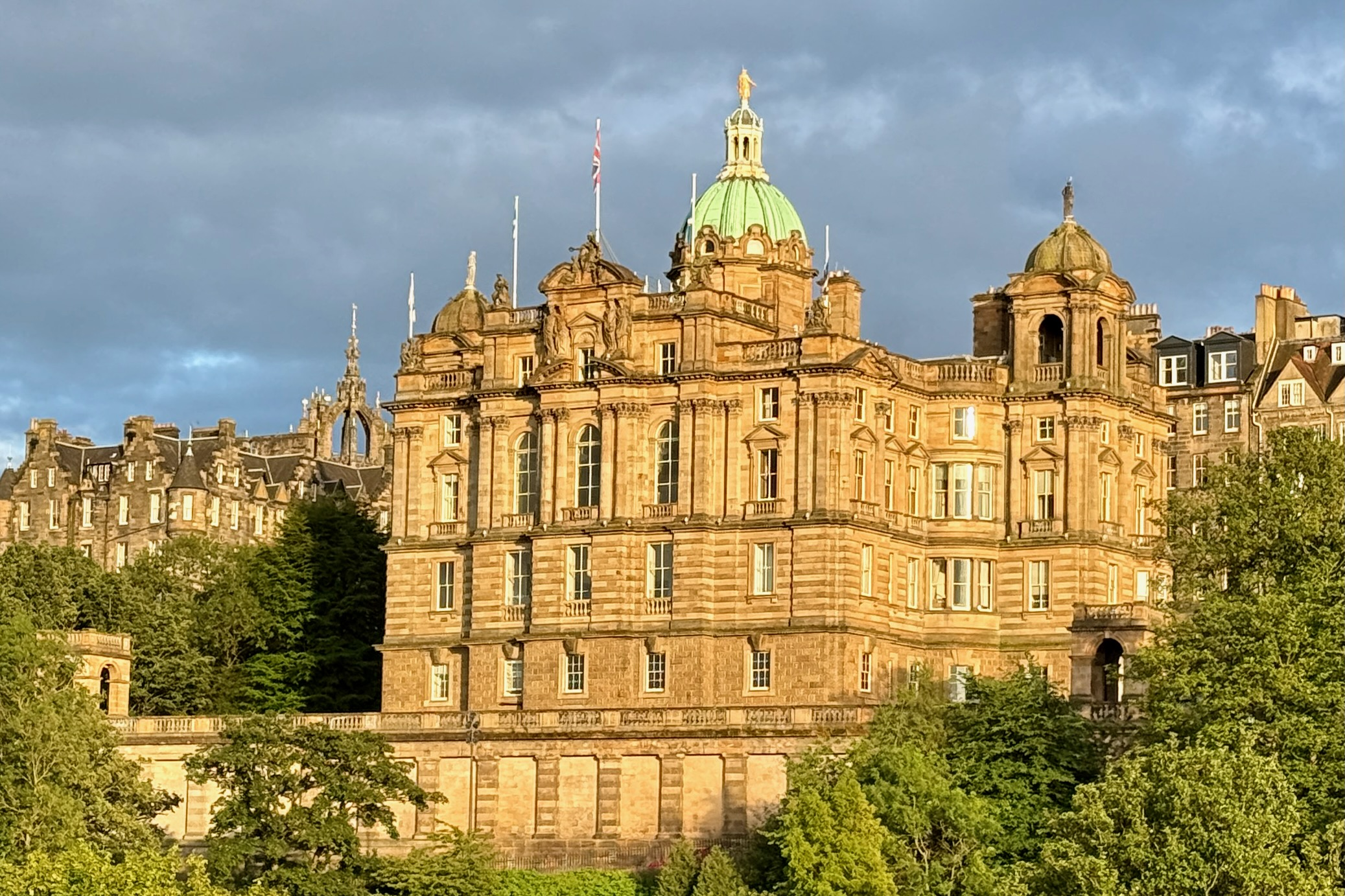
The Royal Bank of Scotland competed with the Bank of Scotland (pictured) in its early history

Competition between the Old and New Banks was fierce and centred on the issue of banknotes. The policy of the Royal Bank was to either drive the Bank of Scotland out of business or take it over on favourable terms. The Royal Bank built up large holdings of the Bank of Scotland's notes, which it acquired in exchange for its own notes, then suddenly presented to the Bank of Scotland for payment. To pay these notes, the Bank of Scotland was forced to call in its loans and, in March 1728, to suspend payments. The suspension relieved the immediate pressure on the Bank of Scotland at the cost of substantial damage to its reputation and gave the Royal Bank a clear space to expand its own business – although the Royal Bank's increased note issue also made it more vulnerable to the same tactics.

Despite talk of a merger with the Bank of Scotland, the Royal Bank did not possess the wherewithal to complete the deal. By September 1728, the Bank of Scotland was able to start redeeming its notes again, with interest, and in March 1729, it resumed lending. To prevent similar attacks in the future, the Bank of Scotland put an "option clause" on its notes, giving it the right to make the notes interest-bearing while delaying payment for six months; the Royal Bank followed suit. Both banks eventually decided that the policy they had followed was mutually self-destructive and a truce was arranged, but it still took until 1751 before the two banks agreed to accept each other's notes.

=== Scottish expansion ===
The bank opened its first branch office outside Edinburgh in 1783 when it opened one in Glasgow, in part of a draper's shop in the High Street. Further branches were opened in Dundee, Rothesay, Dalkeith, Greenock, Port Glasgow, and Leith in the first part of the nineteenth century.

In 1821, the bank moved from its original head office in Edinburgh's Old Town to Dundas House, on St. Andrew Square in the New Town. The building as seen along George Street forms the eastern end of the central vista in New Town. It was designed for Sir Lawrence Dundas by Sir William Chambers as a Palladian mansion, completed in 1774. An axial banking hall (Telling Room) behind the building, designed by John Dick Peddie, was added in 1857; it features a domed roof, painted blue internally, with gold star-shaped coffers. The banking hall continues in use as a branch of the bank, and Dundas House remains the registered head office of the bank to this day.

The rest of the nineteenth century saw the bank pursue mergers with other Scottish banks, chiefly as a response to failing institutions. The assets and liabilities of the Western Bank were acquired following its collapse in 1857; the Dundee Banking Company was acquired in 1864. By 1910, the Royal Bank of Scotland had 158 branches and around 900 staff.

By 1969, economic conditions were becoming more difficult for the banking sector. In response, the Royal Bank of Scotland merged with National Commercial Bank of Scotland. The merger resulted in a new holding company, the National and Commercial Banking Group, with 662 branches in Scotland, which all transferred to the Royal Bank name. The holding company was renamed The Royal Bank of Scotland Group in 1979 and became NatWest Group in July 2020.

=== Expansion into England ===
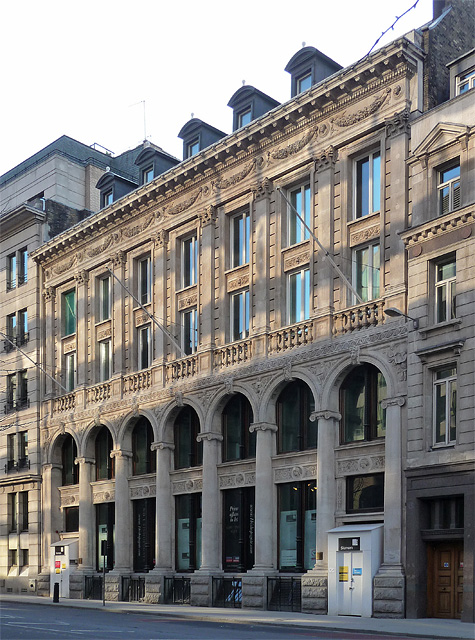
3–5 Bishopsgate in London, branch building of the Royal Bank of Scotland from 1877 to 1984

The expansion of the British Empire in the latter half of the nineteenth century saw the emergence of London as the largest financial centre in the world, attracting Scottish banks to expand southward into England. The first London branch of the Royal Bank of Scotland opened in 1874. However, English banks moved to prevent further expansion by Scottish banks into England; and, after a government committee was set up to examine the matter, the Scottish banks chose to drop their expansion plans. An agreement was reached, under which English banks would not open branches in Scotland and Scottish banks would not open branches in England outside London. This agreement remained in place until the 1960s, although various cross-border acquisitions were permitted.

The Royal Bank's English expansion plans were resurrected after World War I when it acquired various small English banks, including London-based Drummonds Bank (in 1924), which continued as a branch of the Royal Bank of Scotland; Williams Deacon's Bank, based in northwestern England (in 1930) and Glyn, Mills & Co. (in 1939), which together came to be known as the Three Banks Group; the English and Welsh branches were reorganised as Williams & Glyn's Bank in 1969, before adopting the Royal Bank name in 1985.

=== Takeover bids ===
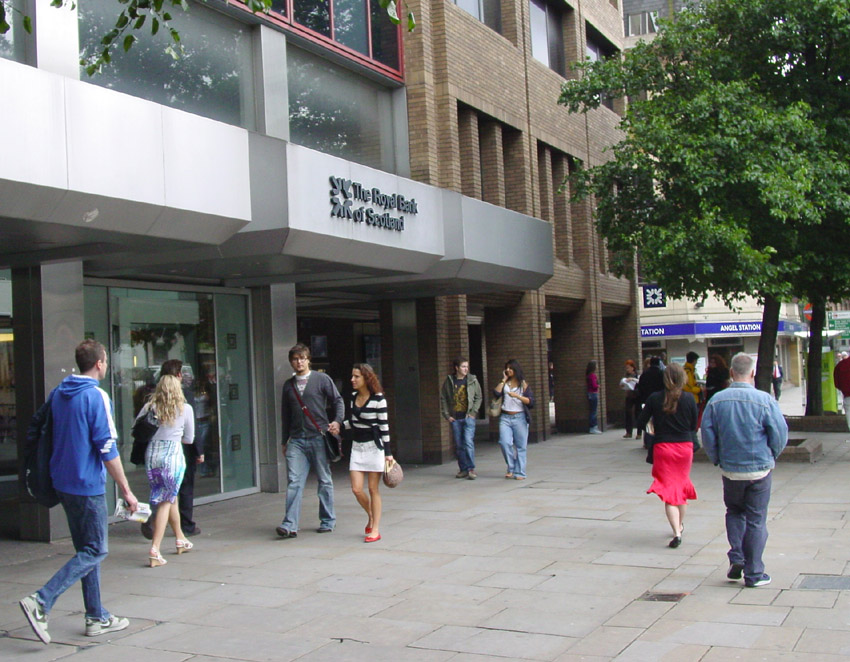
Branch of the Royal Bank of Scotland in Islington, London.

During the late 1970s and early 1980s, the Royal Bank was the subject of three separate takeover approaches. In 1979, Lloyds Bank, which had previously built up a 16.4% stake in the Royal Bank, made a takeover approach for the remaining shares it did not own. The offer was rejected by the board of directors on the basis that it was detrimental to the bank's operations. However, when the Standard Chartered Bank proposed a merger with the Royal Bank in 1980, the board responded favourably. Standard Chartered Bank was headquartered in London, although most of its operations were in the Far East, and the Royal Bank saw advantages in creating a truly international banking group. Approval was received from the Bank of England, and the two banks agreed to a merger plan that would have seen Standard Chartered acquire the Royal Bank and keep the UK operations based in Edinburgh. However, the bid was scuppered by the Hongkong and Shanghai Banking Corporation (HSBC) which tabled a rival offer. The bid by HSBC was not backed by the Bank of England and was subsequently rejected by the Royal Bank's board. However, the British government referred both bids to the Monopolies and Mergers Commission; both were subsequently rejected as being against the public interest.

The Bank did obtain an international partnership with Banco Santander Central Hispano of Spain, each bank taking a 5% stake in the other. However, this arrangement ended in 2005, when Banco Santander Central Hispano acquired UK bank Abbey National – and both banks sold their respective shareholdings.

=== International expansion ===
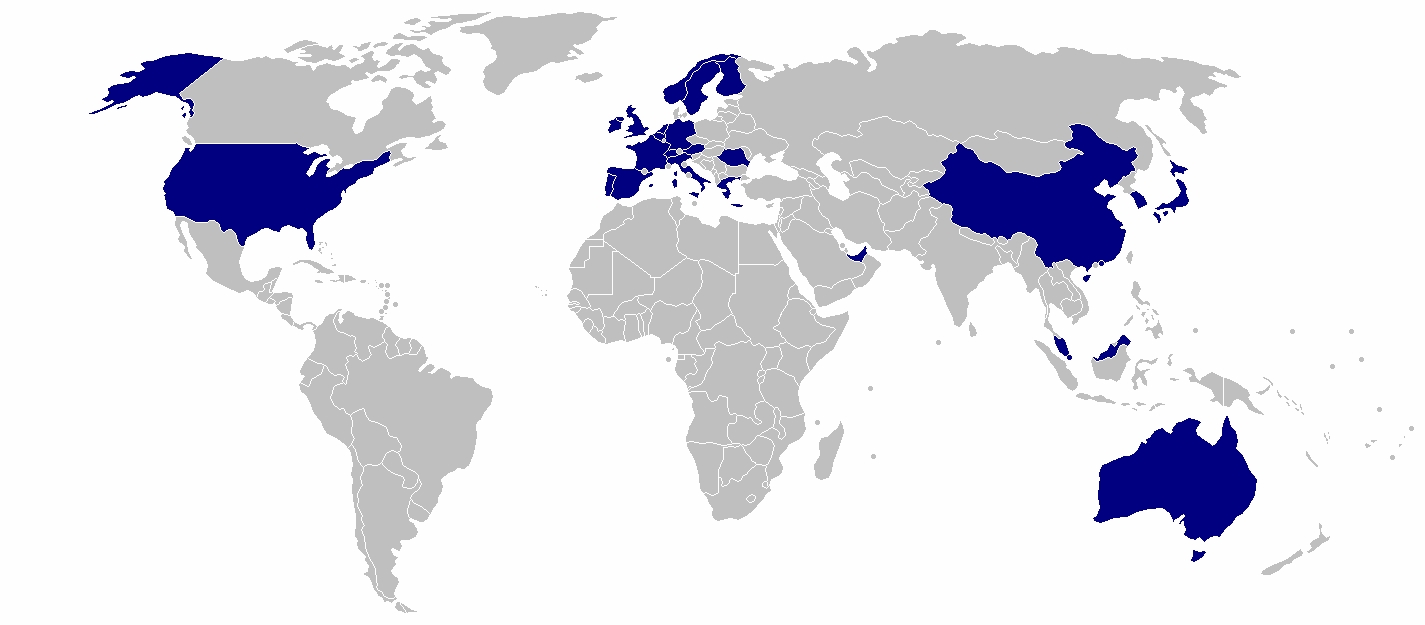
Former international branches of the Royal Bank of Scotland

The first international office of the bank was opened in New York in 1960. Subsequent international banks were opened in Chicago, Los Angeles, Houston, and Hong Kong. In 1988 the bank acquired Citizens Financial Group, a bank based in Rhode Island, United States. Since then, Citizens has acquired several other American banks and in 2004 acquired Charter One Bank.

From 1988 to 2015, it owned Citizens Financial Group, a bank in the United States, and from 2005 to 2009 RBS Group was the second-largest shareholder in the Bank of China, itself the world's fifth-largest bank by market capitalisation in February 2008.

=== Recent history ===
RBS logo used since 2003 until 2016

Following the implosion of the Royal Bank of Scotland in 2008 while under the direction of directors at its Edinburgh headquarters, and its rescue by taxpayer funds, it became a subsidiary of the UK Government. On 20 January 2011, Royal Bank of Scotland were fined £28.58 million for anti-competitive practices that were enacted with Barclays in relation to the pricing of loan products for large professional services firms. Also in 2011, Royal Bank of Scotland prevented Basic Account holders from using the ATMs of most rival banks (although they could still use those of NatWest, Tesco, Morrisons and the Post Office).

In June 2012, computer problems prevented customers accessing accounts. Royal Bank of Scotland released a statement on 12 June 2013 that announced a transition in which CEO Stephen Hester would stand down in December 2013 for the financial institution "to return to private ownership by the end of 2014". For his part in the procession of the transition, Hester received 12 months' pay and benefits worth £1.6 million, as well as the potential for £4 million in shares. The Royal Bank of Scotland stated that, as of the announcement, the search for Hester's successor would commence. Hester was replaced as CEO by New Zealander Ross McEwan, formerly the head of the bank's retail arm, on 1 October 2013. McEwan, who was 56 years old at the start of his tenure, will receive no bonus for his work in 2013 or at the end of 2014, and his pension will be replaced by an annual cash sum equivalent to 35 percent of his salary as CEO.

In November 2013, Royal Bank of Scotland announced it was in talks to sell a shipping loan in ’Eagle Bulk Shipping Inc.’ worth $800 million. It was also announced in that month that the bank was in talks to sell its equity derivatives business to a buyer rumoured to be BNP Paribas. In September 2014, Royal Bank of Scotland announced that they would move their headquarters to London in the event of a Yes vote in the Scottish referendum. Whilst this move would not affect day to day banking services in Scotland, there would be several major ramifications; the key issue being that the Scottish version of Royal Bank of Scotland would become a subsidiary to the London-based holding company. Therefore, tax would be paid chiefly through the London-based company, thus depriving Scotland of significant revenues. This would break a near 300-year period in which the Royal Bank of Scotland has been headquartered in Edinburgh. In March 2015, Royal Bank of Scotland agreed to sell its internationally managed private banking and wealth management business to Switzerland's Union Bancaire Privée UBP SA. The sale includes client relationships managed under Coutts and Adam and Company brands in Switzerland, Monaco, the UAE, Qatar, Singapore and Hong Kong. The terms of the sale were not announced. The operations being sold has CHF 32-billion of client assets under management. Royal Bank of Scotland will continue to offer private banking and wealth management in the British Isles, as well as to international clients with a strong connection to the UK.

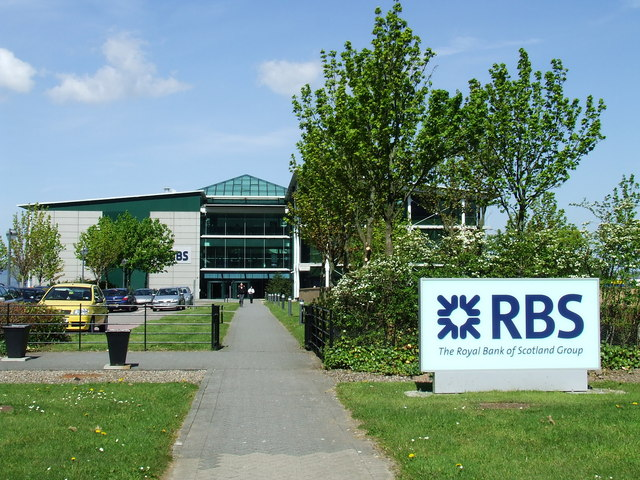
Royal Bank of Scotland mortgage centre in Inverclyde

On 20 March 2017, The Guardian reported that hundreds of banks had helped launder KGB-related funds out of Russia, as uncovered by an investigation named Global Laundromat. The Royal Bank of Scotland was listed among the 17 banks in the UK that were "facing questions over what they knew about the international scheme and why they did not turn away suspicious money transfers," as the bank "handled $113.1 million" in Laundromat cash. Other banks facing scrutiny under the investigation included HSBC, NatWest, Lloyds, Barclays and Coutts. Coutts, owned by RBS, had "accepted $32.8m worth of payments via its office in Zürich, Switzerland." NatWest, also owned by RBS, was named for allowing through $1.1 million in related funds.

In early 2018, The Royal Bank of Scotland Group announced its plans for restructuring to comply with new UK-wide rules on ring-fencing retail banking operations from riskier investment banking operations. As part of this restructuring, all retail banking assets of the existing Royal Bank of Scotland were transferred to Adam and Company, which assumed the Royal Bank of Scotland name in the process. Adam and Company continued as an RBS private banking brand in Scotland, along the same lines as the Messrs. Drummond and Child & Co. businesses in England. As part of the restructuring and brand management, it was decided that NatWest would become RBS Group's primary customer-facing brand in England and Wales. As a result, all Royal Bank of Scotland branded branches in England and Wales were closed as they were located close to NatWest branded branches, which customers would be able to use for counter services instead.

On 14 February 2020, it was announced that the holding company of Royal Bank of Scotland (Royal Bank of Scotland Group plc) would be renamed NatWest Group plc later that year, taking the brand under which the majority of its business is delivered. The change took place on 22 July 2020. The investment management business of Adam and Company was acquired by Canaccord Genuity Group in 2021 and its banking and lending business transferred to Coutts & Co. in 2022 using a banking business transfer scheme approved by the Court of Session in Edinburgh. Child & Co. also closed in 2022, leaving Messrs. Drummond and Holt's Military Banking as the only remaining branches of RBS operating in England and Wales.

==== Proposed Williams and Glyn divestment ====
As a consequence of the British Government taking an 81% shareholding in the RBS Group following the 2008 financial crisis, the group was required by a European Commission ruling to sell a portion of its business, as the commission regarded the shareholding as state aid.

Royal Bank of Scotland unveiled plans in 2009 to resurrect the dormant Williams and Glyn's brand name in preparation for the divestment of its Royal Bank of Scotland-branded retail banking business in England and its NatWest branches in Scotland.

On 27 September 2013, the Royal Bank of Scotland Group confirmed it had agreed to sell 308 Royal Bank of Scotland branches in England and Wales and 6 NatWest branches in Scotland to the Corsair consortium. The branches were due to be divested from the group in 2016 as a standalone business operating under the Williams & Glyn name, although, in August 2016, RBS cancelled the spin-off plan, stating that the new bank could not survive independently. It revealed it would instead seek to sell the division to another bank.

In February 2017, HM Treasury suggested that the bank should abandon the plan to sell the division, and instead focus on initiatives to boost competition within business banking in the United Kingdom. The plan would be subject to approval by the European Commission. A final agreement, known as the "Alternative Remedies Package", was reached with the European Commission in September 2017, allowing RBS Group to retain the Williams & Glyn assets and bringing the sale process to a close.

In May 2018, it was announced that 162 RBS branches in England or Wales that were to have become Williams & Glyn would be closed, resulting in almost 800 job losses, with customers able to use nearby NatWest branches for counter services instead. The closure of a further 54 branches was announced in September 2018 with an expected loss of 258 jobs.

== Banknotes ==
A Royal Bank of Scotland £5 note from 1964

Up until the middle of the 19th century, privately owned banks in Great Britain and Ireland were permitted to issue their own banknotes, and money issued by provincial Scottish, English, Welsh and Irish banking companies circulated freely as a means of payment. While the Bank of England eventually gained a monopoly for issuing banknotes in England and Wales, Scottish banks retained the right to issue their own banknotes and continue to do so to this day. The Royal Bank of Scotland, along with Clydesdale Bank and Bank of Scotland, still prints its own banknotes.

Notes issued by Scottish banks circulate widely and may be used as a means of payment throughout Scotland and the rest of the United Kingdom; although they do not have the status of legal tender they are accepted as promissory notes. No paper money is legal tender in Scotland, even that issued by the Bank of England (which is legal tender in England and Wales).

=== "Fabric of Nature" series (2016) ===
The £5 banknote was the first polymer note to be issued by the Royal Bank of Scotland.

From May 2016 RBS began to replace the "Ilay" series with the new "Fabric of Nature" series of polymer banknotes. The first polymer notes, the £5, came into circulation on 27 October 2016. The £5 note features Nan Shepherd on the obverse accompanied by a quote from her book The Living Mountain, and the Cairngorms in the background. The reverse shows a pair of mackerel, with an excerpt from the poem "The Choice" by Sorley MacLean.

The second polymer note to be introduced was the £10 note, which entered circulation in 2017. It shows Mary Somerville on the obverse, with a quote from her work 'The Connection of the Physical Sciences', and Burntisland beach in the background. The reverse displays two otters and an excerpt from the poem ‘Moorings’ by Norman MacCaig.

=== "Ilay" series (1987) ===
A £100 Royal Bank of Scotland note of the Ilay series

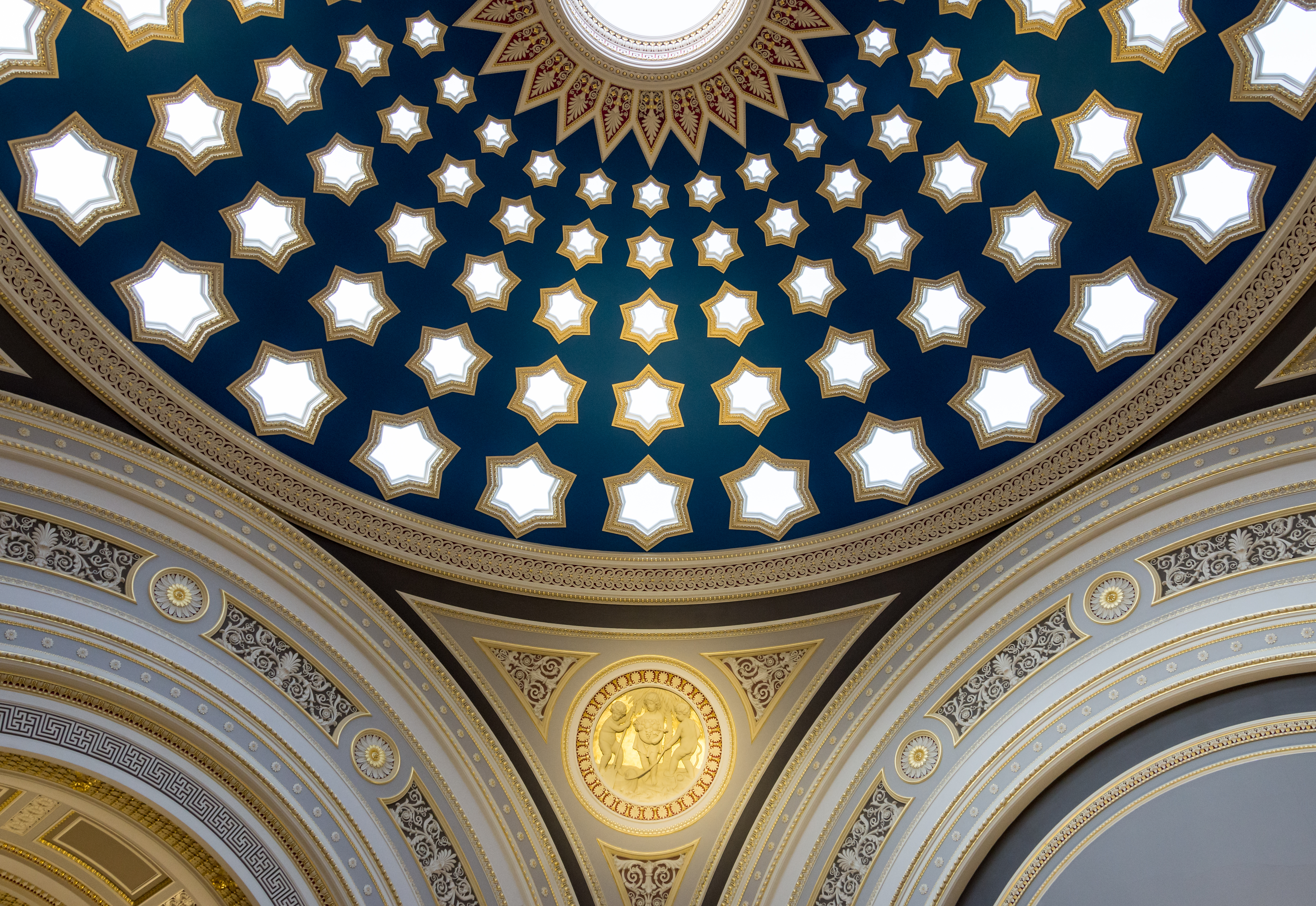
The star-design ceiling of the Edinburgh banking hall which featured on older banknotes

Prior to the current polymer series, the Royal Bank "Ilay" series of banknotes were in circulation, so-called because each denomination featured a picture of Lord Ilay (1682–1761), the first governor of the bank. The image was based on a portrait of Lord Ilay painted in 1744 by the Edinburgh artist Allan Ramsay.

The front of the notes also included an engraving of the facade of Dundas House, the mansion of Sir Laurence Dundas in St. Andrew Square, Edinburgh, which was built by Sir William Chambers in 1774 and later became the bank's headquarters; the bank's coat of arms; and the 1969 arrows logo and branding. The background graphic on both sides of the notes was a radial star design which was based on the ornate ceiling of the banking hall in the old headquarters building, designed by John Dick Peddie in 1857.

On the back of the notes were images of Scottish castles, with a different castle for each denomination:

- 1 pound note featuring Edinburgh Castle
- 5 pound note featuring Culzean Castle
- 10 pound note featuring Glamis Castle
- 20 pound note featuring Brodick Castle
- 50 pound note featuring Inverness Castle (introduced in 2005)
- 100 pound note featuring Balmoral Castle

As of 30 September 2022 the Ilay series was withdrawn, along with all non-polymer banknotes in the United Kingdom.

=== Commemorative banknotes ===
Occasionally the Royal Bank of Scotland issues special commemorative banknotes to mark particular occasions or to celebrate famous people. The Royal Bank was the first British bank to print commemorative banknotes in 1992 followed by several subsequent special issues. These notes are much sought after by collectors and they rarely remain long in circulation. Examples to date have included:

- a £1 note to mark the meeting of the Council of the European Union in Holyrood Palace during the UK's Presidency of the Council of the European Union (1992)
- a £1 note to mark the 100th Anniversary of the death of Robert Louis Stevenson (1994)
- a £1 note to mark the 150th Anniversary of the birth of Alexander Graham Bell (1997)
- a £20 note for the 100th birthday of Queen Elizabeth The Queen Mother (2000)
- a £5 note honouring veteran golfer Jack Nicklaus in his last competitive Open Championship at St Andrews (2005).
- a £1 note to mark the opening of the Scottish Parliament, depicting the General Assembly Hall of the Church of Scotland, the temporary home of the parliament, and a diagram of the floorplan of the new parliament building, designed by Enric Miralles (1999)
- a £50 note to mark the opening of the Royal Bank of Scotland's new headquarters in Gogarburn (2005)
- a £10 note to commemorate the Diamond Jubilee of Elizabeth II. On the reverse of the commemorative note are four intaglio portraits of Elizabeth II, showing her at different stages of her life (2012)
- a £5 note to commemorate the Ryder Cup. It is printed by Giesecke+Devrient on the "Hybrid" substrate.

== Services ==
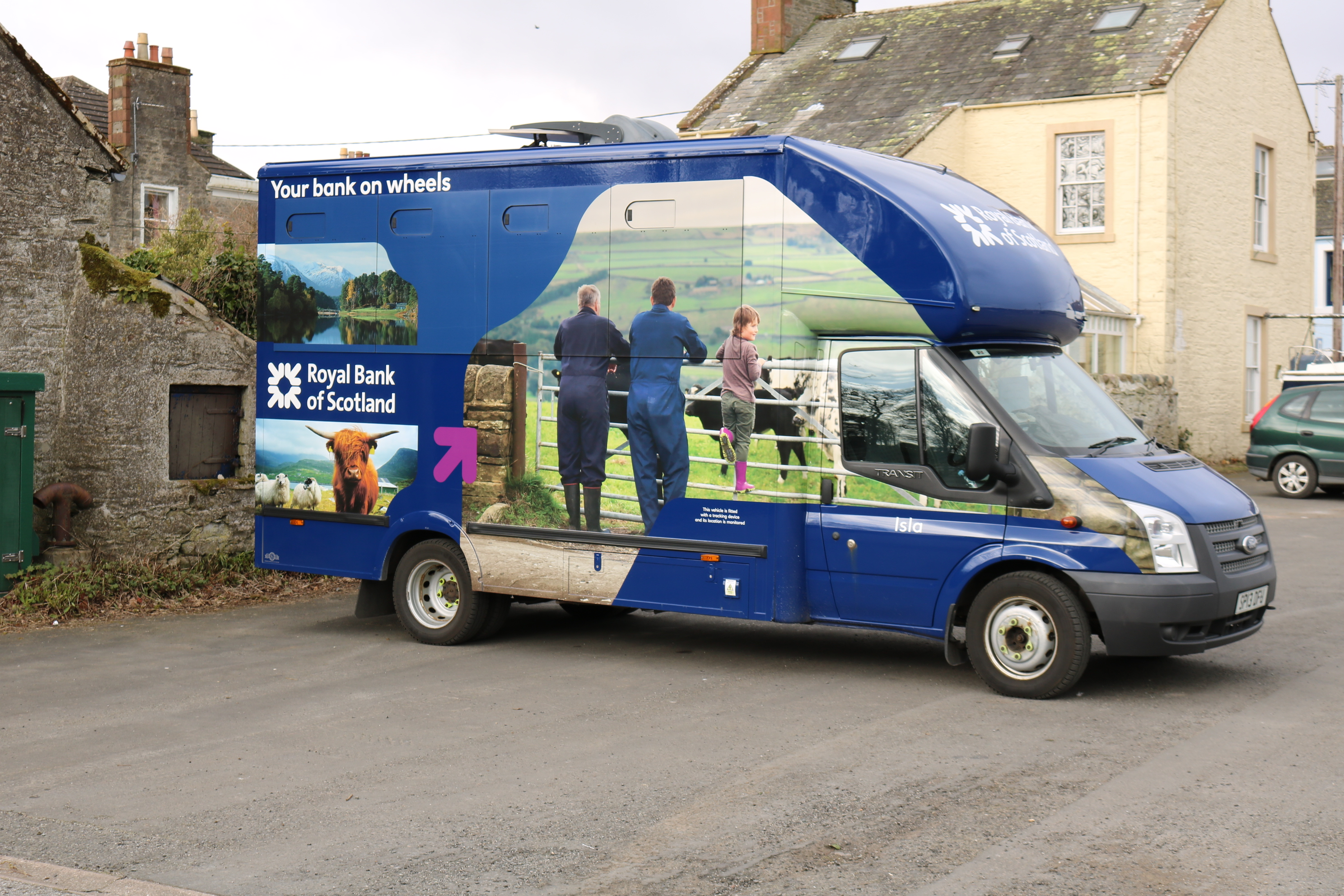
Royal Bank of Scotland "mobile bank" unit

The Royal Bank of Scotland provides a full range of banking and insurance services to personal, business, and commercial customers. As well as traditional branches, phone, and internet banking, Royal Bank of Scotland has operated "mobile branches" since 1946 using converted vans to serve rural areas. There are currently 19 mobile branches.

The bank is authorised by the Prudential Regulation Authority and regulated by both the Financial Conduct Authority and the Prudential Regulation Authority. It participates fully in the Faster Payments Service, an initiative to speed up certain payments, launched in 2008.

In 2006, The Royal Bank of Scotland Group undertook the first trial of PayPass contactless debit and credit cards in Europe. The bank is introducing Visa Debit cards with the technology for current accounts, which can be used to pay for purchases up to £30 by tapping an enabled card on the retailer's terminal. In an effort to enhance security, Royal Bank of Scotland and NatWest introduced hand-held devices in 2007 for use with a card to authorise online banking transactions.

Royal Bank of Scotland is a member of the Cheque and Credit Clearing Company Limited, Bankers' Automated Clearing Services Limited, the Clearing House Automated Payment System Limited and the LINK Interchange Network Limited. It is a member of the Financial Ombudsman Service, UK Payments Administration and of the British Bankers' Association; it subscribes to the Lending Code. The bank is covered by the Financial Services Compensation Scheme with The One account, Drummonds Bank and Holt's Military Banking under one licence.

== Branding ==
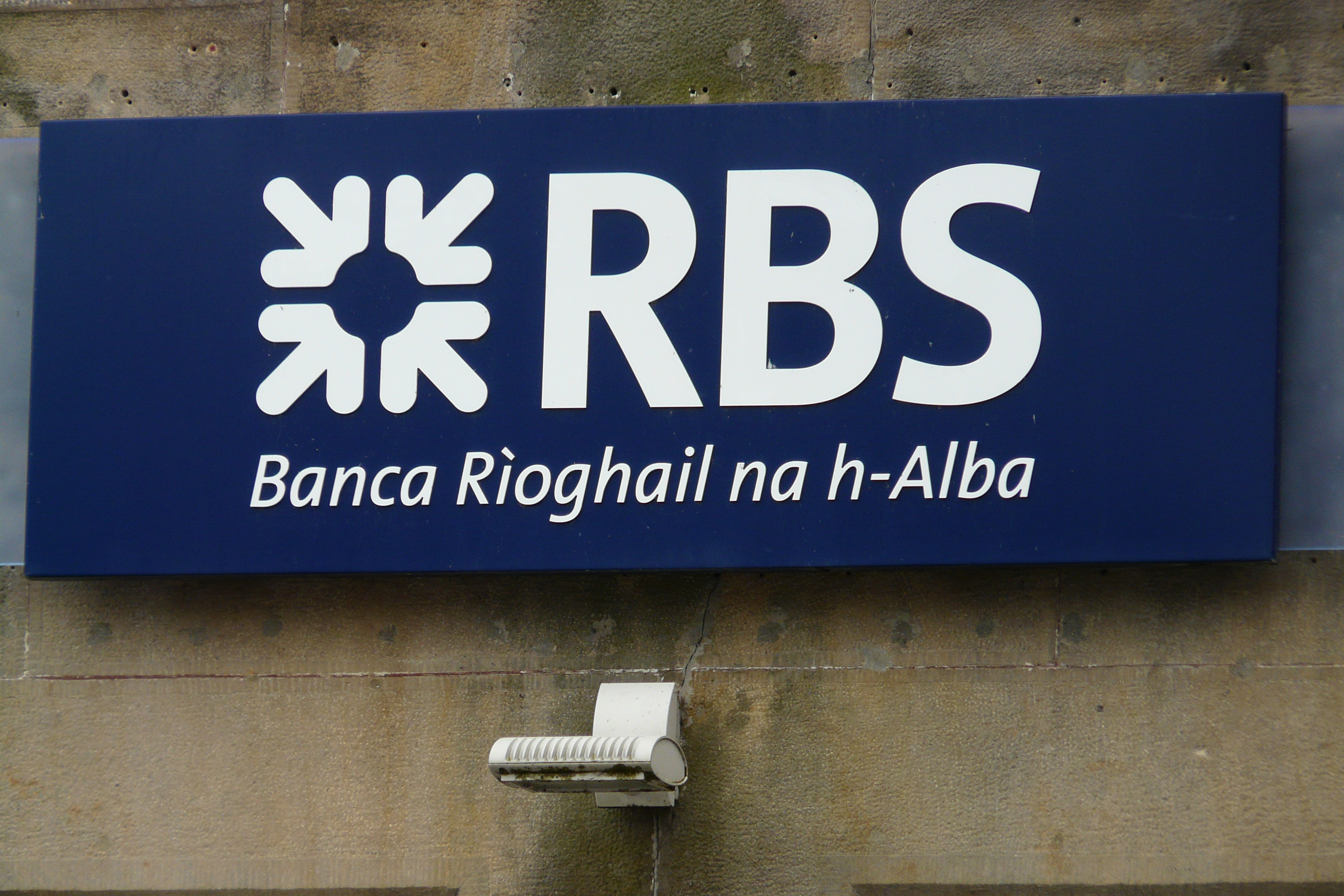
RBS logo with Scottish Gaelic text in Portree.

The Royal Bank of Scotland Group uses branding developed for the Bank on its merger with the National Commercial Bank of Scotland in 1969. The Group's logo takes the form of an abstract symbol of four inward-pointing arrows known as the "Daisy Wheel" and is based on an arrangement of 36 piles of coins in a 6 by 6 square, representing "the accumulation and concentration of wealth by the Group". The Daisy Wheel logo was later adopted by Royal Bank of Scotland Group subsidiaries Ulster Bank in Ireland, Citizens Financial Group in the United States - which as of 2026 still uses the logo as part of its branding despite RBS selling its remaining stake in the company in 2019. Until it was sold in 2010, payment processing company Worldpay also used the logo.

From 2003, the bank began to move away from referring to both the Group brand and its retail banking brand as "The Royal Bank of Scotland", instead using the "RBS" initialism. This was intended to support the positioning of the bank as a Global financial services player as opposed to its roots as a national bank, however, "The Royal Bank of Scotland" continued to be used alongside the RBS initialism, with both appearing on bank signage.

In spring 2014 the full bank name returned to print and television advertising in the form of a new logo with the omission of "The". In August 2016, Ross McEwan confirmed that the bank would use the full name for its business in Scotland in lieu of the RBS acronym, to distance the bank from its previous global expansion plans.

Royal Bank of Scotland sponsored the Williams F1 team from 2005 until the end of 2010. They also were the title sponsor for the Canadian Grand Prix from 2005 until the end of 2008. They have supported tennis player Andy Murray since he was aged 13.

== Controversies ==
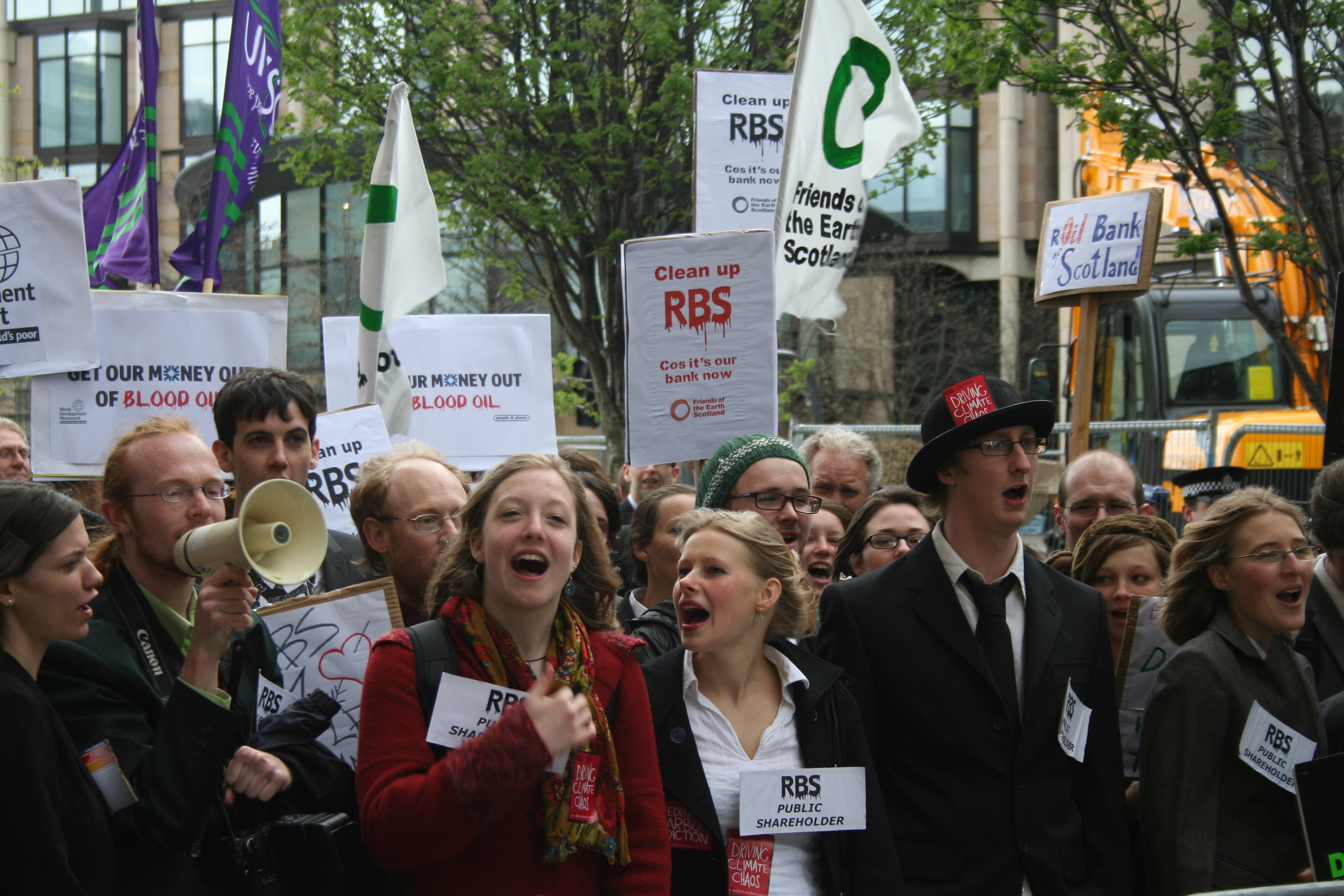
Protest outside the RBS (Royal Bank of Scotland) AGM, Morrison St., Edinburgh, on 18 April 2010

=== Fossil fuel financing ===
In 2007, Royal Bank of Scotland was promoted itself as "The Oil & Gas Bank" including hosting a website www.oilandgasbank.com. A Platform London report estimated that the carbon emissions embedded within Royal Bank of Scotland' project finance reached 36,900,000 tonnes in 2005, comparable to Scotland's carbon emissions. Royal Bank of Scotland helped to provide an estimated £8,000,000,000 from 2006-08 to the energy corporation E.ON and other coal-utilising companies. In 2012, 2.8% of Royal Bank of Scotland' total lending was provided to the power, oil and gas sectors combined. According to Royal Bank of Scotland' own figures, half of its deals to the energy sector were to wind power projects; although, this only included project finance and not general commercial loans.

Responding to this RBS branches and the company's AGM were targeted by protests, and a boycott of the bank was promoted, between 2007-11. A number of groups were involved including Platform London, People & Planet, the World Development Movement, Friends of the Earth and Friends of the Earth Scotland.

In August 2010, Climate Camp UK held a week-long camp in the parkland around RBS' global headquarters at Gogarburn, Edinburgh. A number of disruptive protests took place during the camp, including at RBS branches in the surrounding area.

=== 2008 bail-out ===
82% of Royal Bank of Scotland's shares were acquired by the UK government as part of the 2008 United Kingdom bank rescue package. The UK Government bought Royal Bank of Scotland stock for £42,000,000,000 representing 50p per share. In 2011, the shares were worth 19p, representing a taxpayer book loss of £26,000,000,000. Historically, the Royal Bank of Scotland stock price went from a high of over £69 in early-2007 (taking into account a 3 for 1 reverse stock split that took place later that year) to around £1.20 in February 2009 and up to £1.87 per share by December 2011. In 2012, RBS shares were consolidated on a 1 for 10 basis. The Stock has not recovered from the financial shock of early-2009 and is currently at £3.16 (30 October 2015.) This equated to a price of just 31.6 pence per pre-consolidation share.

The bonus payments paid to Royal Bank of Scotland staff subsequent to the 2008 United Kingdom bank rescue package caused controversy. Staff bonuses were nearly £1,000,000,000 in 2010, even though Royal Bank of Scotland reported losses of £1,100,000,000 for 2010. More than 100 senior bank executives were paid in excess of £1,000,000 each in bonuses. Consequently, former CEO Fred Goodwin was stripped of his knighthood in mid-January, and newly appointed CEO Stephen Hester renounced his £1,000,000 bonus after complaints over the bank's performance. In 2014, comedian Russell Brand staged a protest against banker's bonuses outside the offices of the RBS in London.

RBS' central role in the 2008 financial crisis led to it being targeted by a protest camp, 'Occupy Edinburgh', who set-up outside their headquarters on St. Andrews Square in October 2011. The camp was maintained for 108 days and included a number of rallies and protests, as well as a pirate flag being raised on top of the headquarters of the RBS.

=== Branch closures ===
In 2010, Royal Bank of Scotland promised not to close bank branches where they were the last branch in town. In 2014, Royal Bank of Scotland revoked this and closed 44 branches which were the last branch in town, as branch transactions had fallen by 30% over the last four years.

Royal Bank of Scotland will close 259 more branches across Britain in its latest round of cuts as customers shift to online banking.

=== Allegations of asset-stripping small business customers ===
In October 2016, BuzzFeed and BBC Newsnight published reports from a leaked internal document which showed that RBS had "Systematically Crushed British Businesses" with fines, interest rate hikes and loan withdrawals, often acquiring equity or property at firesale prices, turning a sizeable profit. RBS executives had previously assured Parliament that their Global Restructuring Group (GRG) was not a profit centre. Controversy regarding the GRG was rekindled by the leader of the Liberal Democrats, Vince Cable, and others in January 2018. In February 2018, the Financial Conduct Authority released a "Section 166" report from Promontory Financial Services to Nicky Morgan, Chair of the Treasury Select Committee, detailing widespread abuse of SMEs within GRG. This was despite protracted resistance by the FCA to releasing the report.

== See also ==
- List of investors in Bernard L. Madoff Investment Securities
