= Nan Shepherd =

Scottish memoirist, novelist and poet (1893–1981)

Anna "Nan" Shepherd
- Born: 11 February 1893; Cults, Aberdeenshire, Scotland
- Died: 27 February 1981 (aged 88); Woodend Hospital, Aberdeen, Scotland
- Education: University of Aberdeen
- Occupations: Author, poet
- Writing career
- Language: English, Scots
- Genres: Novels, poetry, non-fiction
- Notable works: The Quarry Wood (1928); The Weatherhouse (1930); A Pass in the Grampians (1933); The Living Mountain (1977)
- Movements: Modernism, Scottish Renaissance

Anna "Nan" Shepherd (11 February 1893 – 27 February 1981) was a Scottish modernist writer and poet, who authored the memoir, The Living Mountain, based on experiences of hill walking in the Cairngorms. The work has been cited as influential by nature writers Robert Macfarlane and Richard Mabey. She also wrote poetry and three novels set in small fictional communities in Northern Scotland. The landscape and weather of this area play a major role in her novels and provide a focus for her poetry.

For most of her working life, Shepherd was a lecturer in English at the Aberdeen College of Education.

== Life ==
Shepherd was born on 11 February 1893 at Westerton Cottage, Cults, near Aberdeen, the second child of Jane Smith (née Kelly) and John Shepherd. Her father was a civil engineer and her paternal grandparents were farmers, her maternal grandfather was a tailor in Aberdeen and her uncle was local architect William Kelly. Her family were Presbyterian. Shortly after her birth the family moved to a house, named Dunvegan, in the same town. She then lived there for most of her life. She attended Cults primary school and Aberdeen High School for Girls, after which she studied at the University of Aberdeen, graduating with an MA in 1915.

After university she joined Aberdeen College of Education, formerly Aberdeen Training Centre for Teachers, and in 1919 became a lecturer in English. She retired from teaching in 1956, and in her retirement edited the Aberdeen University Review until 1963. In 1964, the University of Aberdeen awarded her an honorary doctorate.

Shepherd remained unmarried, due in part to the massive death toll of the First World War, which had an important demographic impact on her generation. In her late twenties however, she had a passionate love affair with the married philosopher John Macmurray, and the despair of this frustrated passion gave rise to confessional poetry, autobiographical reflection, and ultimately a mystical relationship with the Cairngorm Mountains. These were the foundations of her literary output.

In her mid 50s she withdrew from the literary scene, but remained a friend and a supporter of other Scottish writers, including Neil M. Gunn, Marion Angus and Jessie Kesson.

On 27 February 1981, Shepherd died at Woodend Hospital, Aberdeen. She was 88.

== Works ==
=== Novels ===
Shepherd was a major contributor to early Scottish Modernist literature. Her first novel, The Quarry Wood (1928) has often been compared to Sunset Song by Lewis Grassic Gibbon, published four years later, as they both portray restricted, often tragic women in rural Scotland of that time. Her second novel, The Weatherhouse (1930), concerns interactions between people in a small rural Scottish community. Her third and final novel, A Pass in the Grampians (1933), concerns the departure of a teenage girl from a rural community for the big city.

Shepherd's fiction brings out the sharp conflict between the demands of tradition and the pull of modernity, particularly in women's lives. All three novels assign a major role to the landscape and weather in small northern Scottish communities they describe.

=== Poetry ===
While a student at university, Shepherd wrote poems for the student magazine, Alma Mater, and in 1934 she published a poetry collection, In the Cairngorms. This was reissued in 2015 with a new introduction by Robert Macfarlane.

=== Non-fiction ===
Shepherd was a keen hill-walker. Her love for the mountainous Grampian landscape led to a short non-fiction book The Living Mountain, written in the 1940s, but published only in 1977. It is now the book for which she is best known. It has been quoted as an influence by prominent nature writers such as Robert Macfarlane and Joe Simpson. The Guardian called it "the finest book ever written on nature and landscape in Britain". Its functions as a memoir and field notes combine with metaphysical nature writing in the tradition of Thoreau or John Muir. The 2011 Canongate edition included a foreword by Robert Macfarlane and an afterword by Jeanette Winterson, these were also included in the 2019 edition by the same publisher. Annabel Abbs retraced Shepherd's steps through the Cairngorms for her book, Windswept: Walking in the Footsteps of Trailblazing Women (Two Roads, 2021).

=== Essays and further poetry ===
In the years between the publication of In the Cairngorms and The Living Mountain, Shepherd placed articles and essays in magazines and journals, including the Aberdeen University Review and The Deeside Field. A selection of these, with several hitherto unpublished poems, were first collected as Wild Geese: A Collection of Nan Shepherd's Writing, published in 2019 by Galileo Publishers. This includes a short story, "Descent from the Cross", which appeared in the Scots Magazine in 1943.

== Recognition and legacy ==
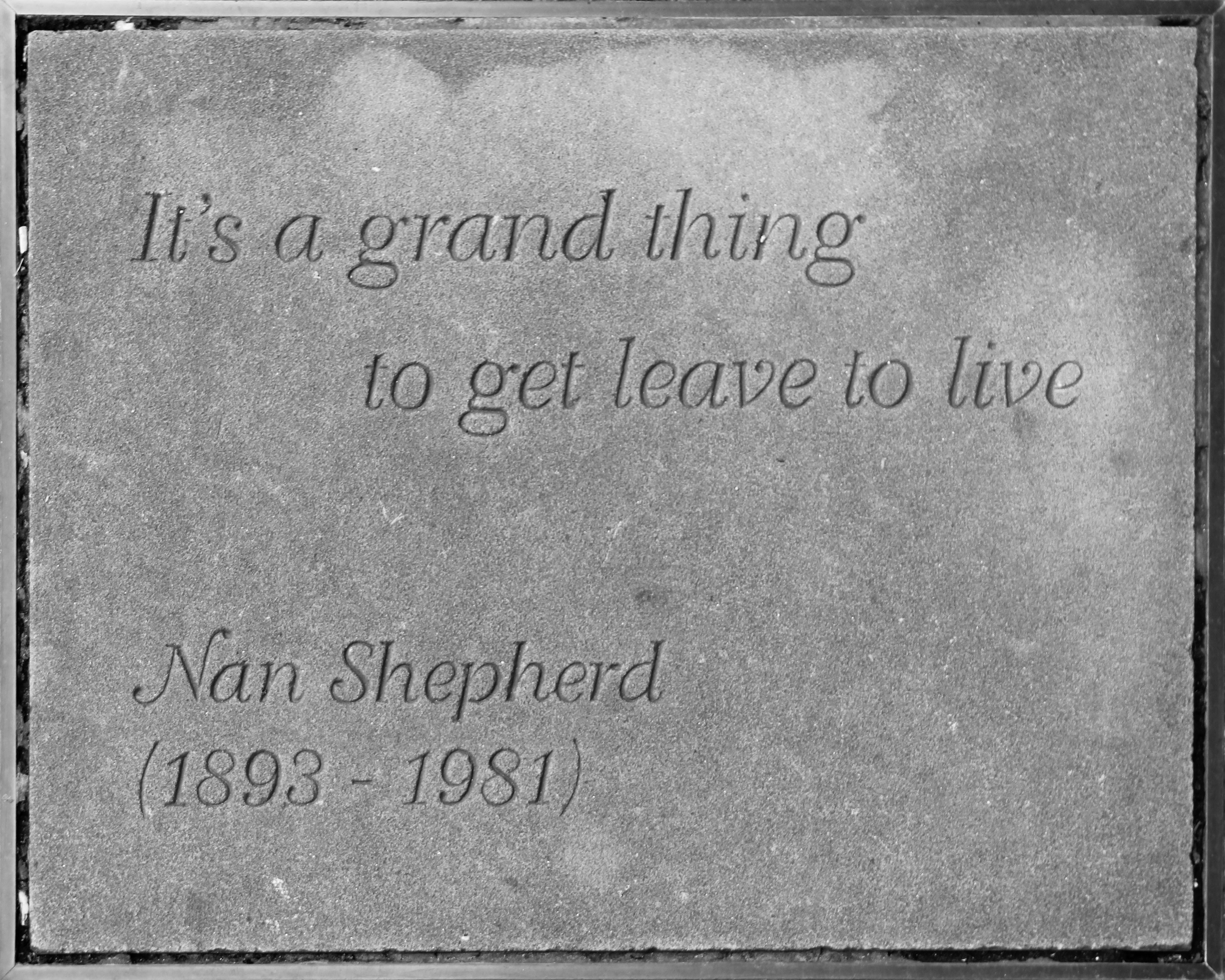
Nan Shepherd's stone slab outside the Writers' Museum in Edinburgh

Nan Shepherd on the Royal Bank of Scotland £5 note

Shepherd is commemorated in Makars' Court outside the Writers' Museum, in Edinburgh's Lawnmarket. Selections for such commemoration are made by The Writers' Museum, The Saltire Society and The Scottish Poetry Library.

The best-known image of Shepherd is a portrait photograph as a young woman wearing a headband and a brooch on her forehead. Shepherd had decided to have her portrait taken at a local photography studio. Whilst sitting for it, she picked up a length of photographic film, wrapped it round her head on a whim and attached a brooch to it, making her look like a Wagnerian princess. In 2016, this image was adapted as an illustration for a new series of £5 notes issued by the Royal Bank of Scotland.

In 2017, a commemorative plaque was placed outside her former home, Dunvegan, in the North Deeside Road, Cults.

In 2024, the play Nan Shepherd: Naked and Unashamed, written by Richard Baron and Ellie Zeegen, was produced in association with Kerri Andrews at Pitlochry Festival Theatre, as a co-production with Firebrand Theatre Company. The play tells the story of Shepherd as author, teacher, hillwalker and lover, and explores the 30-years-delay in the publication of her The Living Mountain. It had a second run in Pitlochry in May and June 2025, with Susan Coyle in the title role.

=== Nan Shepherd Prize ===
The Nan Shepherd Prize has been awarded every two years since 2019. "It aims not only to celebrate nature writing but provide an inclusive platform for new and emerging nature writers from underrepresented backgrounds." The winner receives a publishing deal with Canongate Books, editorial mentoring, and an advance of £10,000.

Winners of the Nan Shepherd Prize
Year	Author	Title
2019	Nina Mingya Powles	Small Bodies of Water
2021	Marchelle Farrell	Uprooting: From the Caribbean to the Countryside – Finding Home in an English Garden
2023	Alycia Pirmohamed	A Beautiful and Vital Place

=== Following Nan ===
The Following Nan project aims "to encourage others to experience the mountains 'Nan Style'", describing this style as:

- To connect (not conquer)
- To slow down (not race)
- To explore the micro (not just the macro)

In September 2024, the project took a group of nine women with mixed abilities and experience on a backpacking expedition in the Cairngorms. The film To Know A Mountain, which recorded the expedition, was shown at the 2024 Kendal Mountain Festival and selected for the 2025 Pirineos Mountain Film Festival and the 2025 London Mountain Film Festival. The Following Nan project has produced a "toolkit" to help others to follow Shepherd's style of mountaineering.

== See also ==
- People on Scottish banknotes
