= Dundas House =

Historical building in Scotland

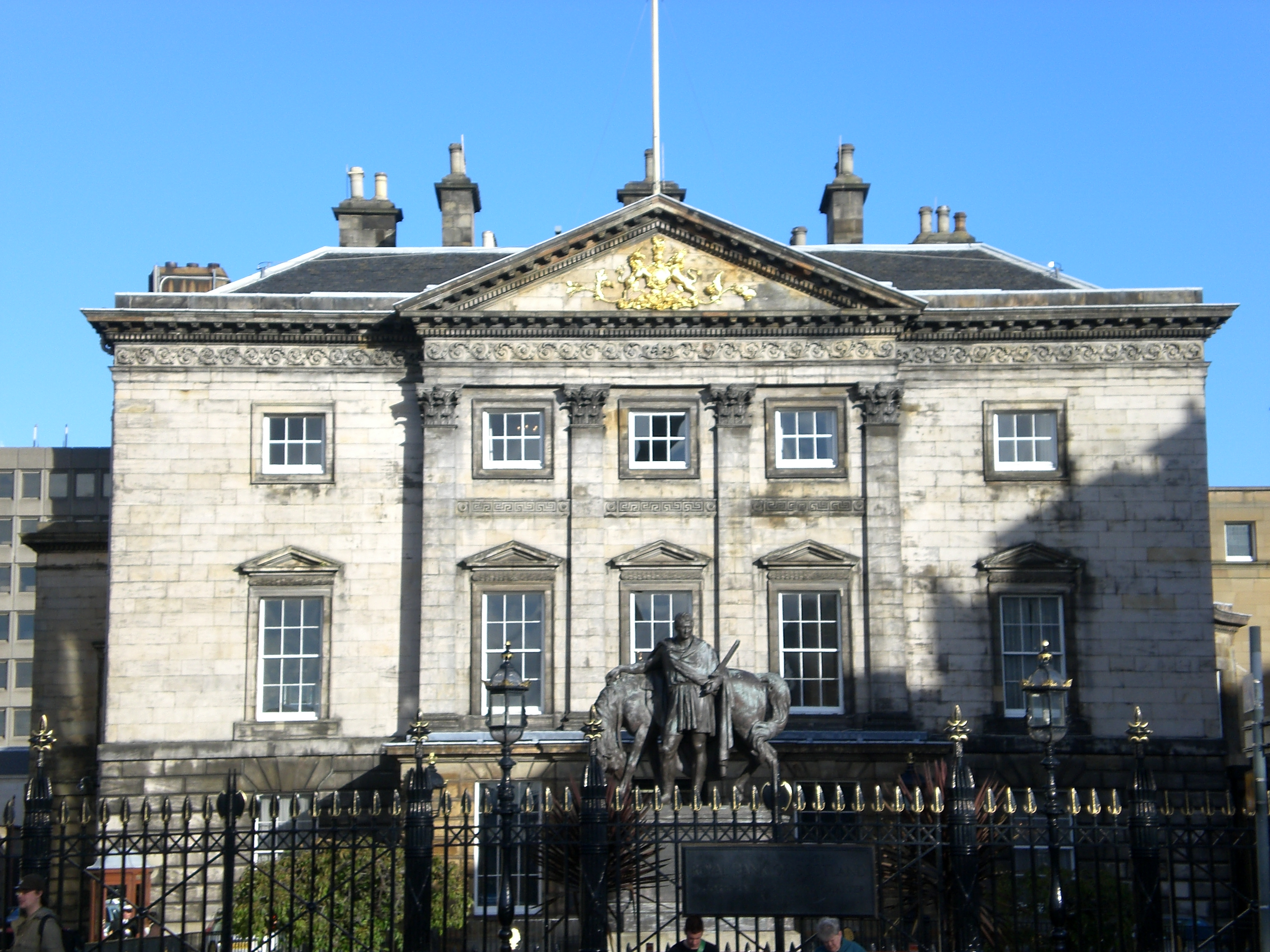
- Dundas House, Edinburgh

- Location within Edinburgh
- 55.954623°N 3.190952°W
- Location: St Andrew Square, Edinburgh, Scotland

History
- Built: 1771–4
- Built for: Sir Lawrence Dundas, 1st Baronet

Site notes
- Architect: Sir William Chambers

Listed Building – Category A
- Official name: 36 St Andrew Square, Dundas House, Royal Bank of Scotland Head Office
- Designated: 13 April 1965
- Reference no.: 29705

Dundas House is a Neoclassical building in Edinburgh, Scotland. It is located at 36 St Andrew Square, in the city's first New Town. The building was completed in 1774 as a private town house for Sir Lawrence Dundas by the architect Sir William Chambers. Much altered internally and extended over the years, today it is the registered office of the Royal Bank of Scotland and its parent, NatWest Group and is protected as a category A listed building.

== Background ==
The site was previously occupied by a rural refreshment house known as "Peace and Plenty" where visitors could enjoy strawberries and cream. This stood on the road from Edinburgh to Stockbridge, called Gabriels Road, of which remnants are still extant at its extremities.

When the town council made plans for a New Town drawn up by James Craig in 1767, the site of the courtyard in front of Dundas House was shown as a proposed church, St. Andrew's, acting as a counterpart to St. George's Church on what became Charlotte Square (originally to be called St. George's Square but an earlier development to the south of the Old Town had been named George Square). The two were separated by the New Town itself laid out on a formal grid centred on George Street along which the two churches were to face each other.

The site of Dundas House is indicated on Craig's plan as being owned by Sir Lawrence Dundas who decided to develop the land by erecting a prestigious townhouse. Initially, he invited designs from the architects John Carr and James Byres, but their proposals were not adopted. Dundas then turned to Sir William Chambers who drew up plans for the mansion in early 1771. The designs were agreed, and soon afterwards construction began on the house. The building was completed by January 1774.

In 1780 Hugo Arnot described the building as "incomparably the handsomest townhouse we ever saw".

The proposed St Andrew's Church was subsequently built at a less prominent site at 13 George Street.

== Commercial use ==
Lord Dundas died in 1781 and his son Sir Thomas Dundas, 2nd Baronet inherited the house. He sold the house to the government in 1794 who converted it to the Excise House, which opened in 1795. At this stage it gained the royal coat of arms of the British Customs and Excise in its pediment.

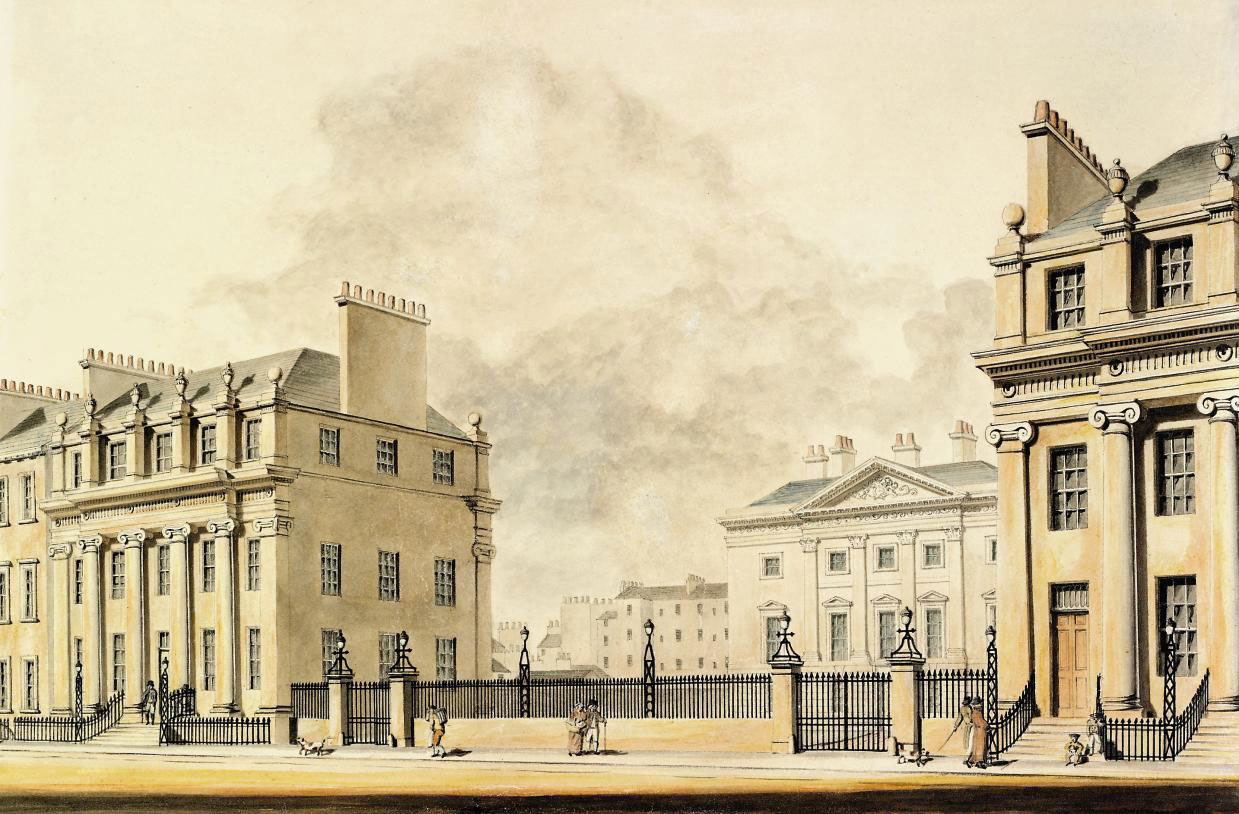
Dundas House, drawn by William Elliott, in 1818

Dundas House was acquired by the Royal Bank of Scotland in 1825 for £35,300. The interior was altered in 1825 and 1828 by Archibald Elliot the Younger, and in 1836 by William Burn. Much of these alterations were removed by John Dick Peddie in 1857 when a banking hall with a distinctive pierced dome was added to the rear of the existing house.

In 1834, a statue of John Hope, 4th Earl of Hopetoun, who had served as Governor of the Bank 1820–23, was placed in the garden in front of Dundas House. The statue was originally commissioned in 1824 by a group of high ranking persons in Edinburgh, led by James Gibson-Craig, from the sculptor Thomas Campbell. Campbell created it in Rome and it was shipped to Britain in 1828. The statue was originally commissioned for Charlotte Square. but its location on the courtyard of Dundas House was agreed by the architect in January 1830, and an appropriate plinth was designed to respect the frontage of Dundas House.

In 1972 the 19th-century banking screens and counters were removed and replaced by white marble counters.

== Architecture ==
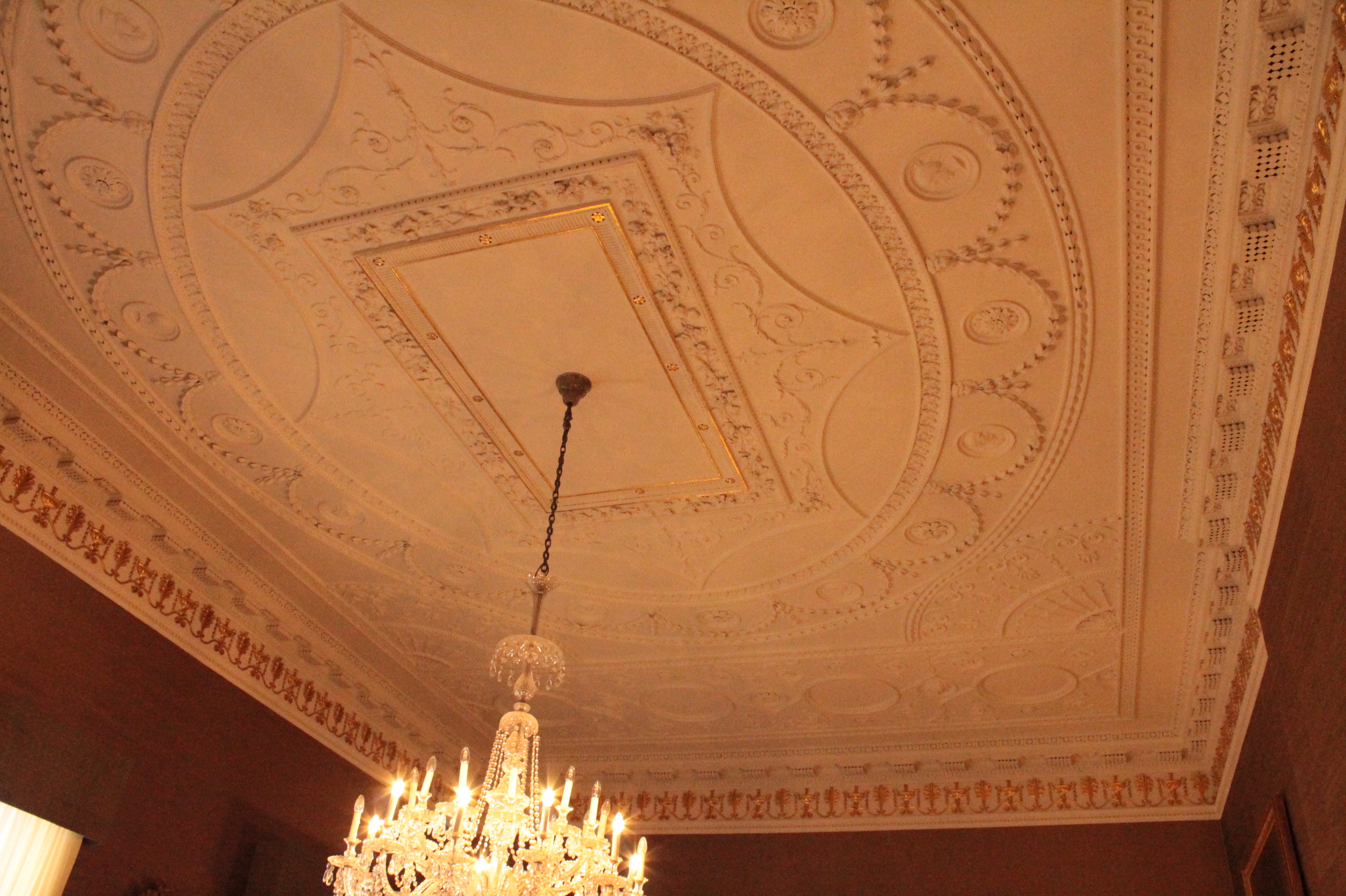
Boardroom ceiling, Dundas House

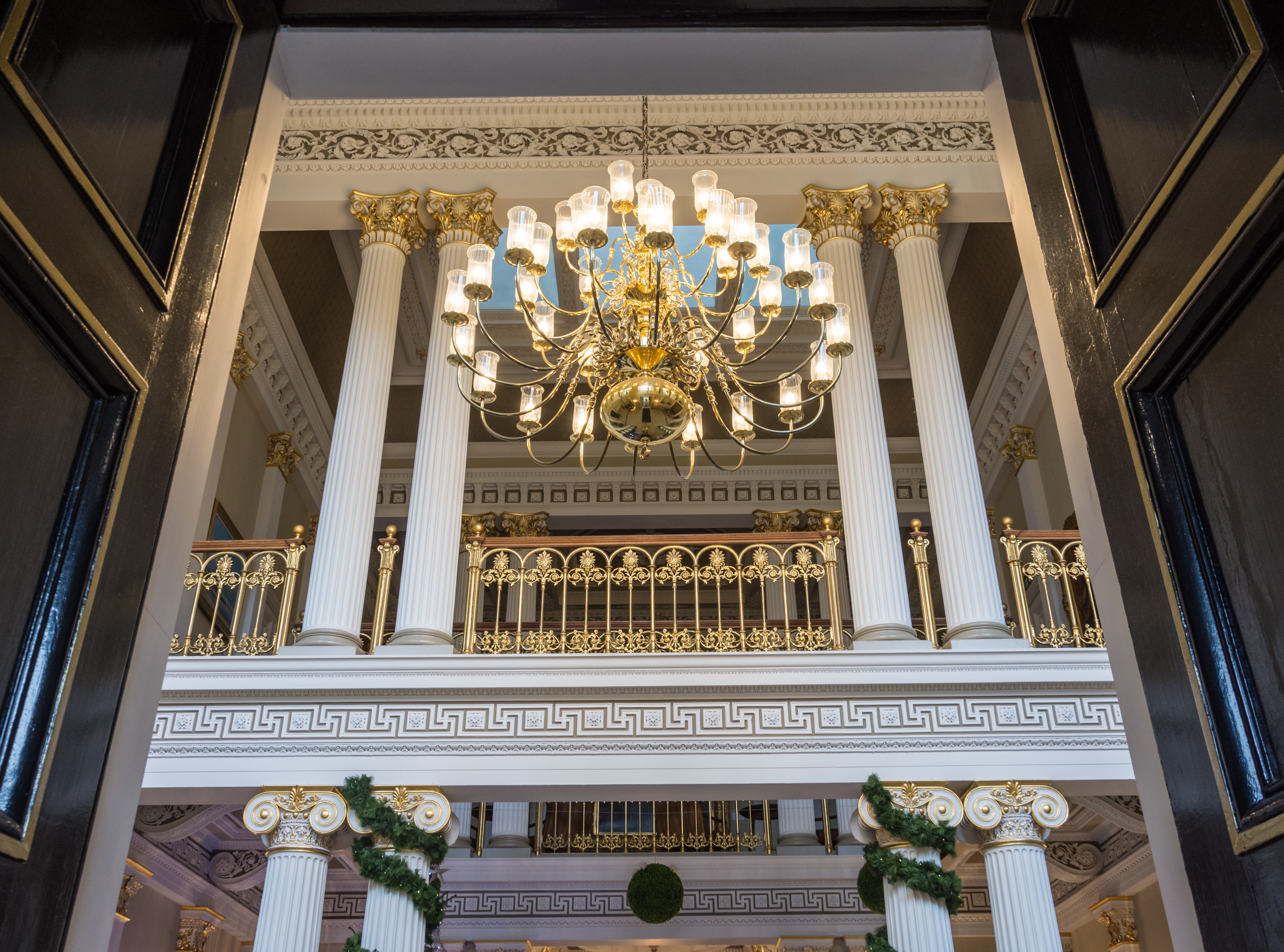
The ornate entrance hall

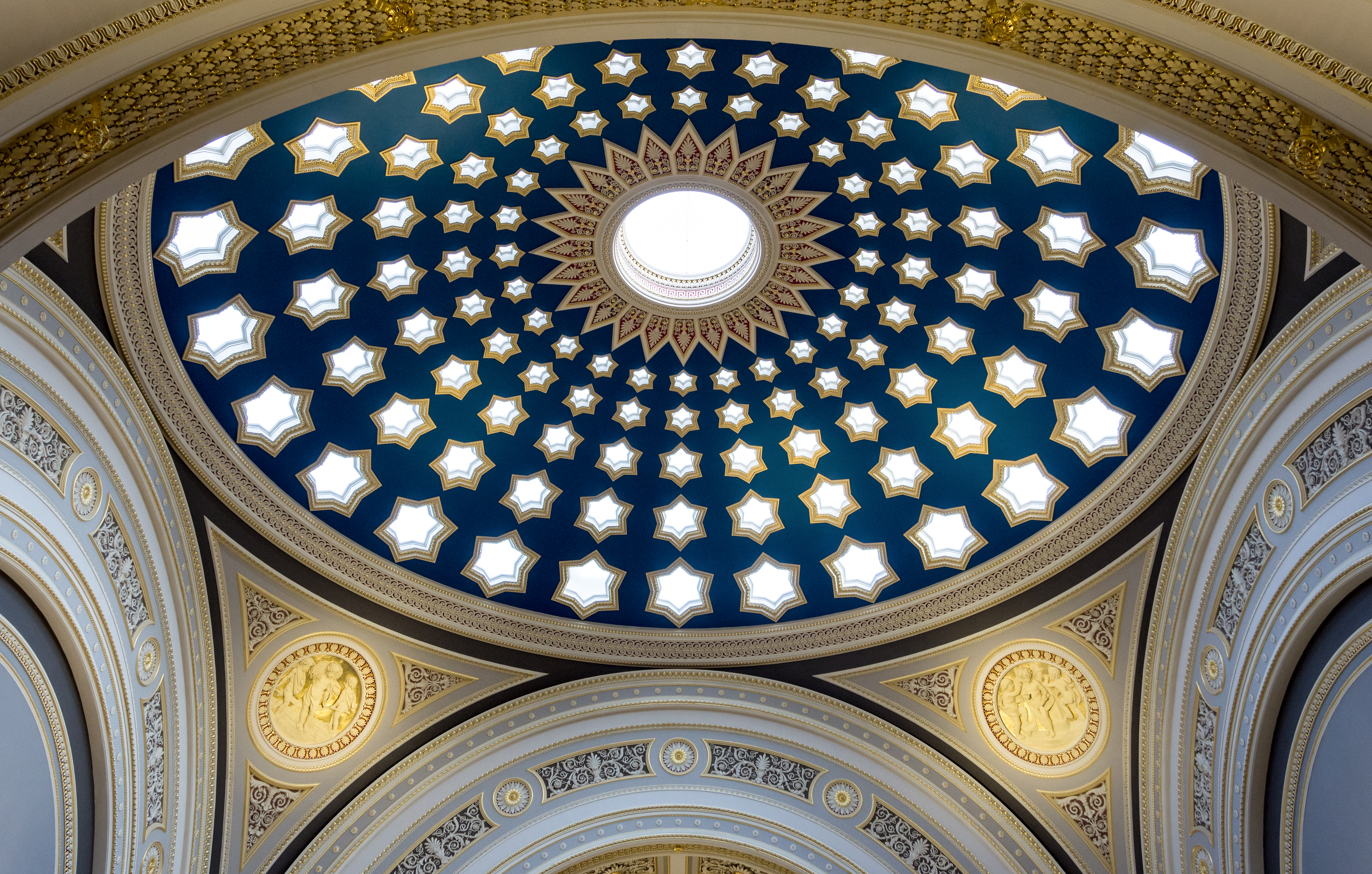
The starry domed ceiling over the banking hall in Dundas House

Dundas House is a free-standing house designed in the Palladian style. It was modelled on Roger Morris's 1729 Palladian villa Marble Hill House in Twickenham, London but is much grander.

The house is built of cream sandstone ashlar, weathered to light grey, from Ravelston Quarry some three miles to the west. It is fronted with a set of Corinthian pilasters supporting a large central pediment. The house is faced with ashlar with a rusticated ground floor.

The large, opulent banking hall, added by Peddie in 1857, is covered by a large circular blue dome which is pierced by 5 tiers of star-shaped gold-rimmed coffered skylights radiating out from the central oculus which diminish in size towards the centre, representing the firmament. An illustration of this star pattern featured on Royal Bank of Scotland's "Islay" series of banknotes which were in circulation 1987–2016.

== The Dunard Centre ==
In 2017, the International Music and Performing Arts Charitable Trust Scotland (IMPACT Scotland) announced plans to develop a 1,000-seat concert venue, to be known as The Dunard Centre, behind Dundas House, replacing a block of banking offices that was built in the 1960s. Dundas House would be retained as a bank and would continue to be accessible to the public. Revised planning permission for the development was granted in 2021 following a legal challenge by the developers of the St James Quarter. Work on clearing the site got under way in February 2023. In June 2024, it was announced that the construction of the building would start early in 2025, with a target completion date in 2029.

== See also ==
- Banknotes of Scotland (featured on design)
