= Banknotes of the pound sterling =

Pound sterling banknotes	The UK and Crown dependencies (red) and overseas territories (blue) using the pound or their local issue

ISO 4217
- Code: GBP

Denominations
- Currency symbol: £
- Subunit: p (penny) (1/100)
Banknotes
- Freq. used: £5, £10, £20, £50
- Rarely used: £1 (not used by the Bank of England, Bank of Scotland, Royal Bank of Scotland, Clydesdale Bank, or in NI); £100 (not issued by the Bank of England)
- Higher valued banknotes do exist, such as the £1,000,000 (Giant) and £100,000,000 (Titan), however, usage is restricted– such as through backing Scottish and Northern Ireland banknotes

Issuance
- Central bank: Bank of England
Note-issuing banks
- England and Wales: Bank of England
- Scotland: Bank of Scotland; Royal Bank of Scotland; Clydesdale Bank
- Northern Ireland: Northern Bank / Danske Bank; Ulster Bank; Bank of Ireland
- Crown dependencies: States of Guernsey; States of Jersey; Isle of Man Government
- Printer: De La Rue

Demographics
- England, Scotland, Northern Ireland, Jersey, Guernsey, Isle of Man
- British Antarctic Territory, South Georgia and the South Sandwich Islands, St Helena, Ascension and Tristan da Cunha (Tristan da Cunha only), Gibraltar

The pound sterling (symbol: £; ISO 4217 currency code: GBP) is the official currency of the United Kingdom, Jersey, Guernsey, the Isle of Man, British Antarctic Territory, South Georgia and the South Sandwich Islands, and Tristan da Cunha. Various banknotes are used within the United Kingdom. The Bank of England has a legal monopoly of banknote issuance in England and Wales, but not in Scotland and Northern Ireland, where three banks in Scotland and three in Northern Ireland, issue their own banknotes as provisioned by the Banking Act 2009. However, the law requires that the issuing banks in Scotland and Northern Ireland hold a sum of Bank of England banknotes (or gold) equivalent to the total value of notes issued.

Versions of the pound sterling issued by Crown Dependencies and other areas are regulated by their local governments and not by the Bank of England. Four British Overseas Territories (Gibraltar, Saint Helena, Ascension Island and the Falkland Islands) also have currencies called pounds which are at par with the pound sterling.

== Currently circulating Bank of England notes ==
The pound sterling banknotes in current circulation consist of Series G Bank of England notes in denominations of £5, £10, £20 and £50. The obverse of these banknotes issued until 4 June 2024 feature the portrait of Elizabeth II originally introduced in 1990. Starting on 5 June 2024, the Bank of England began issuing notes featuring a portrait of Charles III, which will circulate alongside the Elizabeth II notes and gradually replace them. (Note: The designs for the circulation of banknotes can be found here via the Bank of England.) Select banks in Scotland and Northern Ireland also issue their own banknotes at par with Bank of England issues. Scottish and Northern Irish notes, which are not legal tender but are promissory notes, are occasionally rejected as payment in England by merchants unfamiliar with them, and are likely difficult or impossible to exchange outside Britain.

Value	Dimensions	Main colour	Reverse figure	Issue date
Series G polymer banknotes
£5	125 × 65 mm (4.9 × 2.6 in)	Turquoise/Blue	1941 portrait of Winston Churchill by Yousuf Karsh, the Elizabeth Tower, and the maze at Blenheim Palace, the quote "I have nothing to offer but blood, toil, tears and sweat." from a 1940 speech by Churchill, and the Nobel Prize medal.	13 September 2016
£10	132 × 69 mm (5.2 × 2.7 in)	Orange	Portrait of author Jane Austen by James Andrews, based on a portrait by her sister, Cassandra (c. 1810), the quote "I declare after all there is no enjoyment like reading!" from Pride and Prejudice, an illustration of Elizabeth Bennet and a view of Godmersham Park in Kent.	14 September 2017
£20	139 × 73 mm (5.5 × 2.9 in)	Purple	Self-portrait of artist J. M. W. Turner (c.1799), a version of Turner's The Fighting Temeraire, the quote "Light is therefore colour" from an 1818 lecture by Turner, and a copy of Turner's signature as made on his will.	20 February 2020
£50	146 × 77 mm (5.7 × 3.0 in)	Red	1951 photographic portrait of mathematician and computer science pioneer Alan Turing with formulae from Turing's proof and technical drawings for the Bombe, the quote "This is only a foretaste of what is to come and only the shadow of what is going to be" from a 1949 interview with The Times, over a background of Pilot ACE.	23 June 2021

== History ==
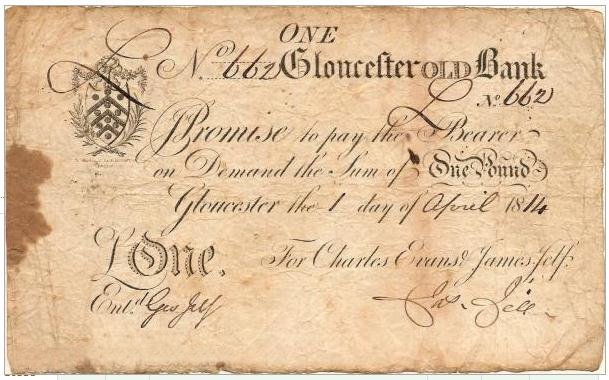
An example of a provincial English banknote: a £1 note issued in 1814 by the Gloucester Old Bank

Until the middle of the 19th century, privately owned banks in Great Britain and Ireland were free to issue their own banknotes. Paper currency issued by a wide range of provincial and town banking companies in England, Wales, Scotland and Ireland circulated freely as a means of payment.

As gold shortages affected the supply of money, note-issuing powers of the banks were gradually restricted by various acts of Parliament, until the Bank Charter Act 1844 gave exclusive note-issuing powers to the central Bank of England. Under the act, no new banks could start issuing notes; and note-issuing banks gradually vanished through mergers and closures. The last private English banknotes were issued in 1921 by Fox, Fowler and Company, a Somerset bank.

However, some of the monopoly provisions of the Bank Charter Act 1844 only applied to England and Wales. The Bank Notes (Scotland) Act 1845 was passed the following year, and to this day, three retail banks retain the right to issue their own sterling banknotes in Scotland, and four in Northern Ireland. Notes issued in excess of the value of notes outstanding in 1844 (1845 in Scotland) must be backed up by an equivalent value of Bank of England notes.

Following the partition of Ireland, the Irish Free State created an Irish pound in 1928; the new currency was pegged to sterling until 1979. The issue of banknotes for the Irish pound fell under the authority of the Currency Commission of the Republic of Ireland, which set about replacing the private banknotes with a single Consolidated Banknote Issue in 1928. In 1928, the Currency and Bank Notes Act 1928 reduced the fiduciary limit for Irish-bank issued sterling banknotes circulating in Northern Ireland to take account of the reduced size of the territory concerned.

Elizabeth II was not the first British monarch to have her face on UK banknotes. George II, George III and George IV appeared on early Royal Bank of Scotland notes and George V appeared on 10/– and £1 notes issued by the British Treasury between 1914 and 1928. However, prior to the issue of its Series C banknotes in 1960, Bank of England banknotes generally did not depict the monarch. Today, notes issued by Scottish and Northern Irish banks do not depict the monarch.

The monarch is depicted on banknotes issued by the Crown dependencies and on some of those issued by overseas territories.

Key events and acts of Parliament that affected the course of banknote history in Great Britain and Ireland
Year	Event	Extent	Impact
1694	Bank of England Act 1694	England & Wales	Incorporation of the Bank of England.
1695	Bank of Scotland Act 1695	Scotland	Creation of the Bank of Scotland, principally as a trading bank.
1696	First banknotes issued by the Bank of Scotland	Scotland	The first sterling notes issued
1707	Acts of Union 1707	England & Wales; Scotland	English and Scottish parliaments merged into the Parliament of Great Britain
1708; 1709	Bank of England Act 1708; Bank of England Act 1709	England & Wales	Prohibition of companies or partnerships of more than six people to set up banks and issue notes, preventing smaller banks from printing their own money.
1727	Chartering of the Royal Bank of Scotland	Scotland	Broke the monopoly of the Bank of Scotland, initiated the banking war when the Royal Bank attempted to drive the Bank of Scotland out of business by stockpiling and then presenting its notes for payment.
1765	Bank Notes (Scotland) Act 1765	Scotland	Prohibited deferred conversion of notes into coin and the issue of notes for values under £1 by banks in Scotland.
1801	Act of Union 1800	Great Britain & Ireland	British and Irish parliaments merged into the Parliament of Great Britain and Ireland
1826	Country Bankers Act 1826	England & Wales	Allowed joint-stock banks with more than six partners which were at least 65 miles away from London to print their own money. Bank of England allowed to open branches in major English provincial cities, enabling wider distribution of its notes.
1826	Bank Notes Act 1826; Bankers (Scotland) Act 1826	Great Britain	Prohibition of circulation of notes under £5 in England. Attempts to apply this law in Scotland fail after a protest by Sir Walter Scott, and the Scottish £1 note is saved.
1833	Bank Notes Act 1833	England & Wales	Gave Bank of England notes official status as legal tender for all sums above £5 in England and Wales to guarantee public confidence in the notes even in the event of a gold shortage.
1844	Bank Charter Act 1844	UK	Took away the note-issuing rights of any new banks; existing note-issuing banks barred from expanding their issue. Began the process of giving the Bank of England a monopoly over banknote issue in England and Wales.
1845	Bank Notes (Scotland) Act 1845	Scotland	Regulated the issue of notes in Scotland; most Scottish banknotes had to be backed by Bank of England notes
1908	Bank closure	Wales	The last private note issuer in Wales, the North and South Wales Bank, loses its note-issuing rights under the 1844 act after it is acquired by Midland Bank.
1914	Currency and Bank Notes Act 1914	UK	HM Treasury given powers to issue banknotes to the values of £1 and 10/– in the UK (ended 1928)
1921	Bank closure	England	The last private note issuer in England, Fox, Fowler and Company of Somerset, loses its note-issuing rights under the 1844 act after it is acquired by Lloyds Bank.
1928	Irish pound established	Ireland	Following the Partition of Ireland, the Irish pound is established as a separate currency (at parity with sterling until 1979); Northern Ireland remains within sterling
1954	Currency and Bank Notes Act 1954	UK	Extended the Bank Notes Act 1833 to make Bank of England notes under £5 in value legal tender; the act also applied to Scotland, making English 10/– and £1 legal tender for the first time. Bank of England withdrew low-denomination notes in 1969 and 1988, removing legal tender from Scotland.
2008	Banking Act 2009	UK	A consequence of the 2008 financial crisis, this act altered the rules governing the issue of private banknotes in Scotland and Northern Ireland, and requires commercial issuing banks to hold backing assets to protect the value of their notes in the event of commercial failure of the bank.

== Everyday use and acceptance ==
The wide variety of sterling notes in circulation means that acceptance of different sterling banknotes varies. Their acceptance may depend on the experience and understanding of individual retailers, and it is important to understand the idea of "legal tender", which is often misunderstood (see section below).

In summary, the various banknotes are used as follows:

=== Bank of England banknotes ===
Most sterling notes are issued by the Bank of England. These are legal tender in England and Wales. Bank of England notes are generally accepted in the Overseas Territories which are at parity with sterling. In Gibraltar, there are examples of pairs of automatic cash dispensers placed together, one stocked with Bank of England notes, and the other with local ones.

=== Scottish banknotes ===
Banknotes issued by Scottish banks are the recognised sterling currency in Scotland, although they are not legal tender (nor, in Scottish law, are Bank of England notes). They are always accepted by traders in Scotland, and are usually accepted elsewhere in the United Kingdom. However, some retailers outside Scotland may be unfamiliar with the notes and they are sometimes refused. Institutions such as clearing banks, building societies and the Post Office will readily accept Scottish bank notes. Branches of the Scottish note-issuing banks situated in England dispense Bank of England notes and are not permitted to dispense their own notes from those branches. Modern Scottish banknotes are denominated in sterling, and have exactly the same value as Bank of England notes; they should not be confused with the former pound Scots, a separate currency which was abolished in 1707.

=== Northern Irish banknotes ===
Banknotes issued by Northern Irish banks have the same legal status as Scottish banknotes in that they are promissory notes issued in pounds sterling and may be used for cash transactions anywhere in the United Kingdom. However, they are rarely seen outside of Northern Ireland. In England and Wales, although they might be accepted by any shop, they are often not accepted without explanation. Like Scottish notes, clearing banks and building societies will accept them. Northern Irish pound sterling banknotes should not be confused with the Irish pound (or punt), the former currency of the Republic of Ireland, which was replaced by the euro in 2002.

=== Banknotes of the Crown dependencies ===
The Bailiwicks of Jersey and Guernsey, and the Isle of Man, are possessions of the Crown but are outside the United Kingdom; they are in currency union with the United Kingdom and issue pound sterling banknotes in local designs (Jersey and Guernsey pounds are freely interchangeable within the Channel Islands). In the United Kingdom, they are intermittently accepted by merchants. However, they are accepted by banks and post offices and the holder can exchange these notes for other sterling banknotes. They also issue their own coinage.

=== British Overseas Territories ===
There are fourteen British Overseas Territories, many of which issue their own currencies which are distinct under ISO 4217: Gibraltar, the Falkland Islands, and St Helena, Ascension Island have their own pounds which are at par with sterling. These notes cannot be used in the UK or outside the territories of origin. Falkland Island pounds are also valid in South Georgia and the South Sandwich Islands and the British Antarctic Territory. Saint Helena pounds, however, cannot be used in the constituent territory of Tristan da Cunha, where sterling is the only official currency.

The remaining British Overseas Territories use the Bermudian dollar, the Cayman Islands dollar, the Eastern Caribbean dollar, the Euro, the New Zealand dollar, or the United States dollar.

== Legal tender ==
In the UK legal tender specifically relates to the settlement of debts: a debtor cannot successfully be sued for non-payment if they pay the exact amount into court in legal tender. Legal tender is solely for the guaranteed settlement of debts, and does not imply a right to pay with cash in other contexts.

Banknotes do not have to be classed as legal tender to be acceptable for trade; millions of retail transactions are carried out each day in the UK using debit cards and credit cards, none of which is a payment using legal tender. Equally, traders may offer to accept payment in foreign currency, such as the euro, yen, or US dollars. Acceptability as a means of payment is essentially a matter for agreement between the parties involved. Where a transaction is subject to VAT, the transaction must be converted to sterling for tax purposes.

Millions of pounds' worth of sterling banknotes in circulation are not legal tender, but that does not mean that they are illegal or of lesser value; their status is of "legal currency" (that is to say that their issue is approved by the British parliament) and they are backed up by Bank of England securities.

Bank of England notes are the only banknotes that are legal tender in England and Wales. Scottish and Northern Irish banknotes are not legal tender anywhere, and Jersey, Guernsey and Manx banknotes are only legal tender in their respective jurisdictions. Although these banknotes are not legal tender in the UK, this does not mean that they are illegal under English law, and creditors and traders may accept them if they so choose. Traders may, on the other hand, choose not to accept banknotes as payment, as contract law across the United Kingdom allows parties not to engage in a transaction at the point of payment if they choose not to.

In Scotland and Northern Ireland, no banknotes, not even those issued by local banks, are legal tender. They have a similar legal standing to cheques or debit cards, in that their acceptability as a means of payment is essentially a matter for agreement between the parties involved, although Scots law requires any reasonable offer for settlement of a debt to be accepted.

Until 31 December 1984, the Bank of England issued £1 notes, and these notes did have legal tender status in Scotland and Northern Ireland while they existed. The Currency and Bank Notes Act 1954 defined Bank of England notes of less than £5 in value as legal tender in Scotland. Since the English £1 note was removed from circulation in 1988, this leaves a legal curiosity in Scots law whereby there is no paper legal tender in Scotland. HM Treasury has proposed extending legal tender status to Scottish banknotes. The proposal has been opposed by Scottish nationalists who believe it would reduce the independence of the Scottish banking sector.

Most of the notes issued by the note-issuing banks in Scotland and Northern Ireland have to be backed by Bank of England notes held by the issuing bank. The combined size of these banknote issues is well over a billion pounds. To make it possible for the note-issuing banks to hold equivalent values in Bank of England notes, the Bank of England issues special notes with denominations of one million pounds ("Giants") and one hundred million pounds ("Titans") for internal use by the other banks.

Banknotes are no longer redeemable in gold, and the Bank of England will only redeem sterling banknotes for more sterling banknotes or coins. The contemporary sterling is a fiat currency which is backed only by securities; in essence promissory notes from the Treasury that represent future income from the taxation of the population. Some economists term this "currency by trust", as sterling relies on the faith of the user rather than any physical specie.

== Issuing banks and authorities ==
The following table lays out the various banks or authorities which are authorised to print pound sterling banknotes, organised by territory:

United Kingdom
England and Wales	Scotland	Northern Ireland
Bank of England	Bank of Scotland; Royal Bank of Scotland; Clydesdale Bank	Bank of Ireland; Danske Bank; Ulster Bank; A further retail bank, First Trust Bank, issued its own banknotes until 30 June 2020
Crown dependencies
Isle of Man	Bailiwick of Jersey	Bailiwick of Guernsey
Isle of Man Government (Manx pound)	States of Jersey (Jersey pound)	States of Guernsey (Guernsey pound)
British overseas territories
Gibraltar	Saint Helena	Falkland Islands
Government of Gibraltar (Gibraltar pound)	Government of Saint Helena (Saint Helena pound)	Government of the Falkland Islands (Falkland Islands pound)

== Bank of England notes ==
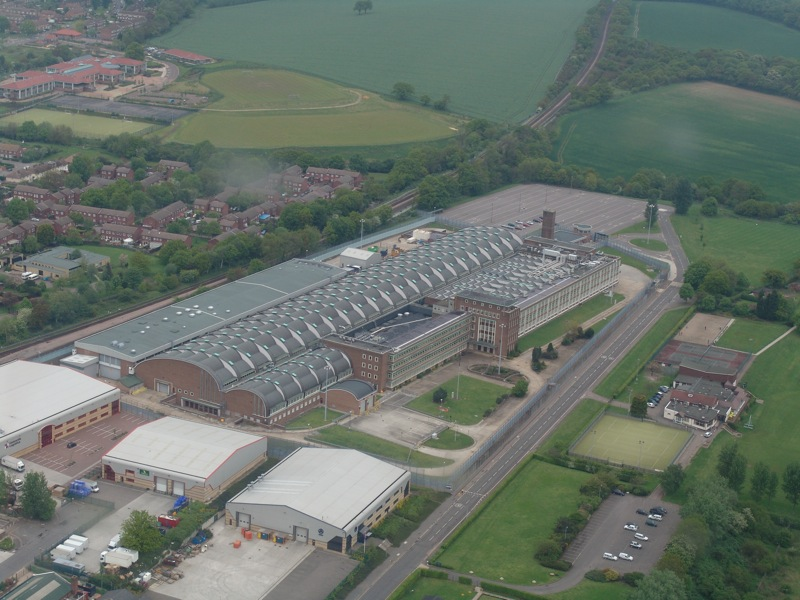
The Debden Security Printing Ltd printing facility, owned by De La Rue, which prints Bank of England banknotes

In 1921, the Bank of England gained a legal monopoly on the issue of banknotes in England and Wales, a process that started with the Bank Charter Act 1844 when the rights of other banks to issue notes was restricted.

The bank issued its first banknotes in 1694, although before 1745 they were written for irregular amounts, rather than predefined multiples of a pound. It tended to be times of war, which put inflationary pressure on the British economy, that led to greater note issue. In 1759, during the Seven Years' War, when the lowest-value note issued by the Bank was £20, a £10 note was issued for the first time. In 1793, during the war with revolutionary France, the Bank issued the first £5 note. Four years later, £1 and £2 notes appeared, although not on a permanent basis. Notes did not become entirely machine-printed and payable to the bearer until 1855.

At the start of the First World War, the government issued £1 and 10/– Treasury notes to replace the sovereign and half-sovereign gold coins. The first coloured banknotes were issued in 1928, and were also the first notes to be printed on both sides. The Second World War saw a reversal in the trend of warfare creating more notes: to combat forgery, higher denomination notes (some as high as £1,000) were removed from circulation. (Note: The Bank of England issued banknotes in denominations of £100, £200, £500 and £1000 starting in 1725. These denominations were withdrawn on 16 April 1945 and have not been superseded. However, a number of Scottish and Northern Irish retail banks still issue £100 notes.)

There are no Welsh banknotes in circulation; Bank of England notes are used throughout Wales. The last Welsh banknotes were withdrawn in 1908 upon the closure of the last Welsh bank, the North and South Wales Bank. An attempt was made in 1969 by a Welsh banker to revive Welsh banknotes, but the venture was short-lived and the notes did not enter general circulation, surviving today only as a collectors' curiosity.

All Bank of England notes issued since Series C in 1960 through June 2024 depict Elizabeth II, who was monarch at the time, on the obverse side, in full view facing left; her image also appears as a hidden watermark, facing right; recent issues have the anti-photocopier security EURion constellation around.

In September 2022, following the death of Elizabeth II, speculation arose as to when the Bank of England would begin replacing banknotes with her portrait on for ones with the portrait of Charles III. After the end of the mourning period, the Bank announced that the portrait of the King intended for use on its banknotes would be released by the end of 2022. New banknotes with the portrait of the King would circulate alongside existing banknotes with the image of the late Queen for an unspecified period. Images of the revised notes featuring a new portrait of the King, as well as his personal cypher, were released by the Bank of England on 20 December 2022, and entered circulation on 5 June 2024. The portrait of Charles III is based on a photograph taken when he was in his early 60s.

The Bank of England has a set of criteria for choosing characters for banknotes – initially, it looks at who has previously featured, to allow for a reflection of the diversity of society. It does not accept fictional characters, or any living people with the exception of the reigning monarch, but instead aims for individuals that are both widely admired, and are considered to have made an important contribution to British society and culture. The final criterion is that the individual has an easily recognisable portrait available for use. This does not need to be a painting, as, up to October 2026, there have been two sculptures and two photographs used.

=== Historical figures ===
Bank of England historical figures notes
Value	Size	Obverse portrait	Reverse portrait	Issued	Withdrawn	Time in circulation
Series D
10/-	121 × 62 mm (4.8 × 2.4 in)	Queen Elizabeth II in Garter mantle and hat by Harry Eccleston	Sir Walter Raleigh by Unknown	Never issued		
50p	121 × 62 mm (4.8 × 2.4 in)	Queen Elizabeth II in Garter mantle and hat by Harry Eccleston	Sir Walter Raleigh by Unknown	Never issued		
£1	135 × 67 mm (5.3 × 2.6 in)	Queen Elizabeth II in Garter mantle and Diamond Diadem by Harry Eccleston	Sir Isaac Newton by Sir Godfrey Kneller	9 February 1978	11 March 1988	10 years, 1 month and 2 days
£5	145 × 78 mm (5.7 × 3.1 in)	Queen Elizabeth II in Garter mantle and Diamond Diadem by Harry Eccleston	Duke of Wellington by Sir Thomas Lawrence	11 November 1971	29 November 1991	20 years, 2 weeks and 4 days
£10	151 × 85 mm (5.9 × 3.3 in)	Queen Elizabeth II in Robe of State and Diamond Diadem by Harry Eccleston	Florence Nightingale by Unknown	20 February 1975	20 May 1994	19 years and 3 months
£20	160 × 90 mm (6.3 × 3.5 in)	Queen Elizabeth II in Robe of State and Diamond Diadem by Harry Eccleston	William Shakespeare by William Kent & Peter Scheemakers	9 July 1970	19 March 1993	22 years, 8 months, 1 week and 3 days
£50	169 × 95 mm (6.7 × 3.7 in)	Queen Elizabeth II in Robe of State and Diamond Diadem by Harry Eccleston	Sir Christopher Wren by Sir Godfrey Kneller	20 March 1981	20 September 1996	15 years and 6 months
Series E
£5	135 × 70 mm (5.3 × 2.8 in)	Queen Elizabeth II in Girls of Great Britain and Ireland Tiara by Don Ford	George Stephenson by Charles Turner	7 June 1990	21 November 2003	13 years, 5 months, 1 week and 6 days
£10	142 × 75 mm (5.6 × 3.0 in)	Queen Elizabeth II in Girls of Great Britain and Ireland Tiara by Don Ford	Charles Dickens by John Watkins	29 April 1992	31 July 2003	11 years, 3 months and 2 days
£20	149 × 80 mm (5.9 × 3.1 in)	Queen Elizabeth II in Girls of Great Britain and Ireland Tiara by Don Ford	Michael Faraday by Henry Dixon	5 June 1991	28 February 2001	9 years, 8 months, 3 weeks and 2 days
£50	156 × 85 mm (6.1 × 3.3 in)	Queen Elizabeth II in Girls of Great Britain and Ireland Tiara by Don Ford	Sir John Houblon by Robert Grave	20 April 1994	30 April 2014	20 years, 1 week and 3 days
Series E (Variant)
£5	135 × 70 mm (5.3 × 2.8 in)	Queen Elizabeth II in Girls of Great Britain and Ireland Tiara by Don Ford	Elizabeth Fry by Charles Robert Leslie	21 May 2002	5 May 2017	14 years, 11 months and 2 weeks
£10	142 × 75 mm (5.6 × 3.0 in)	Queen Elizabeth II in Girls of Great Britain and Ireland Tiara by Don Ford	Charles Darwin by Julia Margaret Cameron	7 November 2000	1 March 2018	17 years, 3 months, 3 weeks and 1 day
£20	149 × 80 mm (5.9 × 3.1 in)	Queen Elizabeth II in Girls of Great Britain and Ireland Tiara by Don Ford	Sir Edward Elgar by Unknown	22 June 1999	30 June 2010	11 years, 1 week and 1 day
£50	Never designed					
Series F
£5	Never designed					
£10	Never designed					
£20	149 × 80 mm (5.9 × 3.1 in)	Queen Elizabeth II in Girls of Great Britain and Ireland Tiara by Don Ford	Adam Smith by James Tassie	13 March 2007	30 September 2022	15 years, 6 months, 2 weeks and 3 days
£50	156 × 85 mm (6.1 × 3.3 in)	Queen Elizabeth II in Girls of Great Britain and Ireland Tiara by Don Ford	Matthew Boulton & James Watt by William Ridley and Sir Thomas Lawrence	2 November 2011	30 September 2022	10 years, 10 months and 4 weeks
Series G (Queen Elizabeth II)
£5	125 × 65 mm (4.9 × 2.6 in)	Queen Elizabeth II in Girls of Great Britain and Ireland Tiara by Don Ford	Sir Winston Churchill by Yousuf Karsh	13 September 2016	In use	10 years, 1 month and 5 days
£10	132 × 69 mm (5.2 × 2.7 in)	Queen Elizabeth II in Girls of Great Britain and Ireland Tiara by Don Ford	Jane Austen by James Andrews	14 September 2017	In use	9 years, 1 month and 4 days
£20	139 × 73 mm (5.5 × 2.9 in)	Queen Elizabeth II in Girls of Great Britain and Ireland Tiara by Don Ford	J. M. W. Turner by J.M.W. Turner	20 February 2020	In use	6 years, 7 months and 4 weeks
£50	146 × 77 mm (5.7 × 3.0 in)	Queen Elizabeth II in Girls of Great Britain and Ireland Tiara by Don Ford	Alan Turing by Elliott & Fry	23 June 2021	In use	5 years, 3 months, 3 weeks and 6 days
Series G II (King Charles III)
£5	125 × 65 mm (4.9 × 2.6 in)	King Charles III	Sir Winston Churchill by Yousuf Karsh	5 June 2024	In use	2 years, 4 months, 1 week and 6 days
£10	132 × 69 mm (5.2 × 2.7 in)	King Charles III	Jane Austen by James Andrews	5 June 2024	In use	2 years, 4 months, 1 week and 6 days
£20	139 × 73 mm (5.5 × 2.9 in)	King Charles III	J. M. W. Turner by J.M.W. Turner	5 June 2024	In use	2 years, 4 months, 1 week and 6 days
£50	146 × 77 mm (5.7 × 3.0 in)	King Charles III	Alan Turing by Elliott & Fry	5 June 2024	In use	2 years, 4 months, 1 week and 6 days
High Value
£1,000,000	210 × 148 mm (8.3 × 5.8 in)	None		c. 1990	Uncirculated	
£10,000,000	228 × 152 mm (9.0 × 6.0 in)	None		2003	Uncirculated	
£100,000,000	297 × 210 mm (11.7 × 8.3 in)	None		2004	Uncirculated	

==== Series D ====
In the mid-1960s, shortly after the introduction of Series C, the Bank of England proposed to introduce a new banknote series featuring people from British history. In addition to enhancing the appearance of banknotes, the complexity of the new designs was intended to make counterfeiting harder. The task of designing the new Series D notes was given to the Bank's new in-house designer, Harry Eccleston, who not only designed the notes themselves, but also created three individual portraits of the Queen. (Note: The first saw the Queen in Garter robe and cap, and was intended for the 10 shilling note; the second had the Garter cap replaced by the George IV State Diadem, and also featured Queen Alexandra's cluster earrings, and was used for the one pound and five pound notes; the third had the Garter robe replaced by Robe of State, and featured the State Diadem, Queen Alexandra's earrings and Queen Victoria's Golden Jubilee necklace, and was for the ten, twenty and fifty pound notes.) It was initially envisaged that all of the denominations of notes then in circulation would be issued under Series D. To that end, a Series D 10/– note was designed, featuring Sir Walter Raleigh, and which would become the 50 pence note upon decimalisation, and intended to be the first of the new series to be issued. However, inflation had shorted the estimated lifespan of the note to roughly five months in circulation. As a result, the new note was not introduced, and the 10/- note was instead replaced with a 50p coin in 1969. Instead, the £20 note was the first Series D note to enter circulation in 1970, with William Shakespeare on the reverse.

Runaway inflation through the 1970s also considerably eroded the lifespan of the £1 note, and the Series D £1 note, featuring Sir Isaac Newton, was discontinued in 1984, having been replaced by a coin the year before, and was officially withdrawn from circulation in 1988. Nonetheless, all banknotes, regardless of when they were withdrawn from circulation, may be presented at the Bank of England where they will be exchanged for current banknotes. Other banks may also decide to exchange old banknotes, but they are under no obligation to do so.

==== Series E ====
When Series E was introduced in 1990, a new portrait of the Queen was commissioned based on photographs by Don Ford, one of the Bank of England's photographers. In this portrait, intended for all of the Series E banknotes, the Queen is shown wearing the Girls of Great Britain and Ireland Tiara, Queen Alexandra's cluster earrings and Queen Victoria's Golden Jubilee necklace. Two different Series E sets were produced, each with a different set of historical figures - the first Series E banknote was the £5 featuring George Stephenson, followed by the £20 (Michael Faraday), the £10 (Charles Dickens) and the £50 (Sir John Houblon). The three lower denominations were replaced by the Series E (Variant) series, featuring Elizabeth Fry, Charles Darwin and Sir Edward Elgar; the £50 note was not replaced during this period.

==== Series F ====
The Series F banknotes consists of the £20 note introduced in 2007 and the £50 introduced in 2011; no £5 or £10 notes were designed for this series. Its launch was announced on 29 October 2006 by the Governor of the Bank of England. These notes were withdrawn on 30 September 2022, after which they are only exchangeable for Series G banknotes.

The first of these new notes, a £20 note, features the Scottish economist Adam Smith, the first Scot to appear on an English note. (The first non-Englishman, Anglo-Irish Field Marshal Arthur Wellesley, Duke of Wellington, appeared on the Series D £5 in 1971.) Smith also features on £50 notes issued by the Clydesdale Bank. Previous issues of Bank of England £20 notes were known to have suffered from a higher incidence of counterfeiting (276,000 out of 290,000 cases detected in 2007) than any other denomination. The note, which also includes enhanced security features, entered circulation on 13 March 2007.

The next new Series F banknote, the £50 note, entered circulation on 2 November 2011. It is the first Bank of England banknote to feature two Britons on the reverse: James Watt (another Scotsman) and Matthew Boulton.

The £5 and £10 notes were never issued.

==== Series G ====
Series G portraits

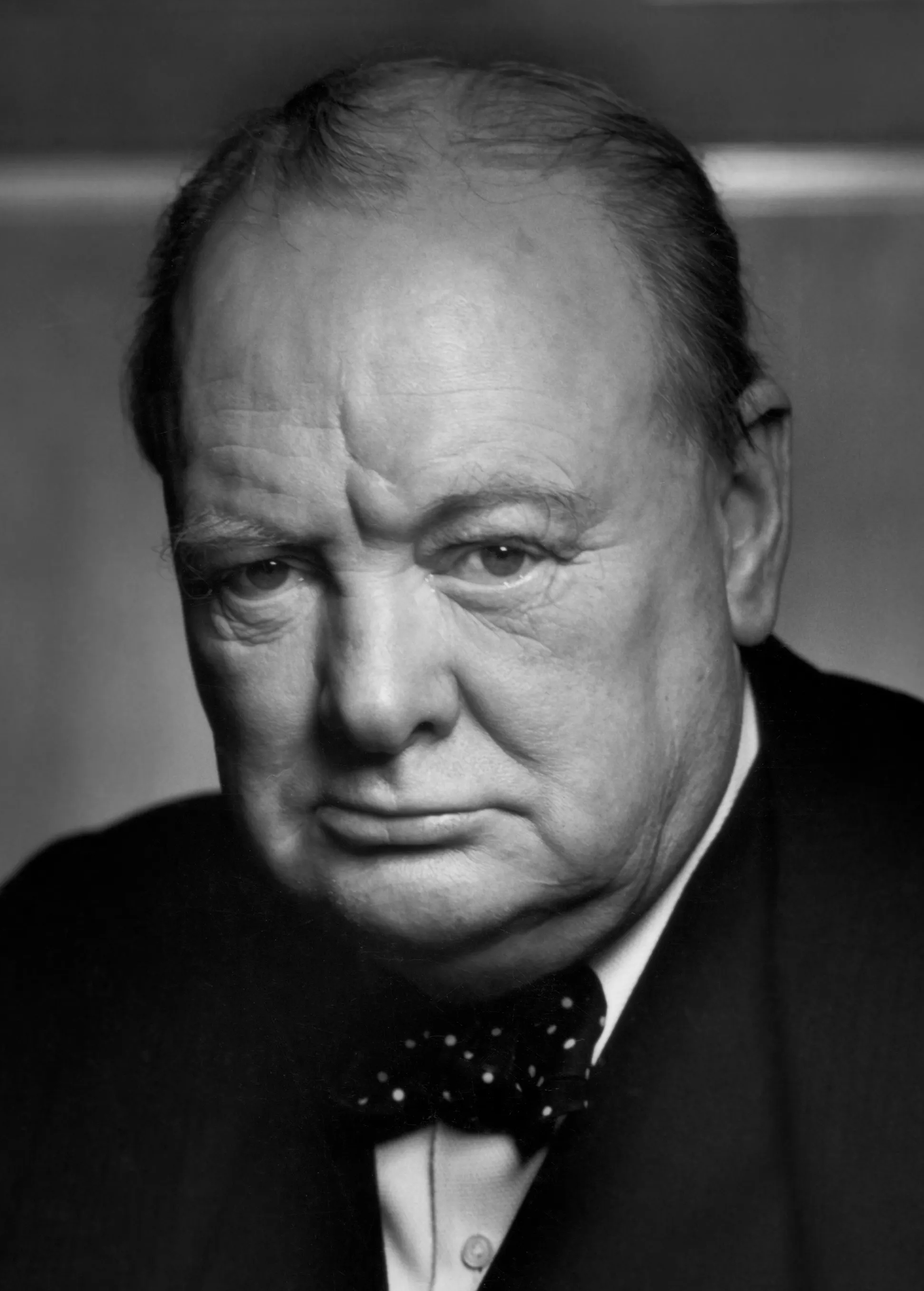
Sir Winston Churchill

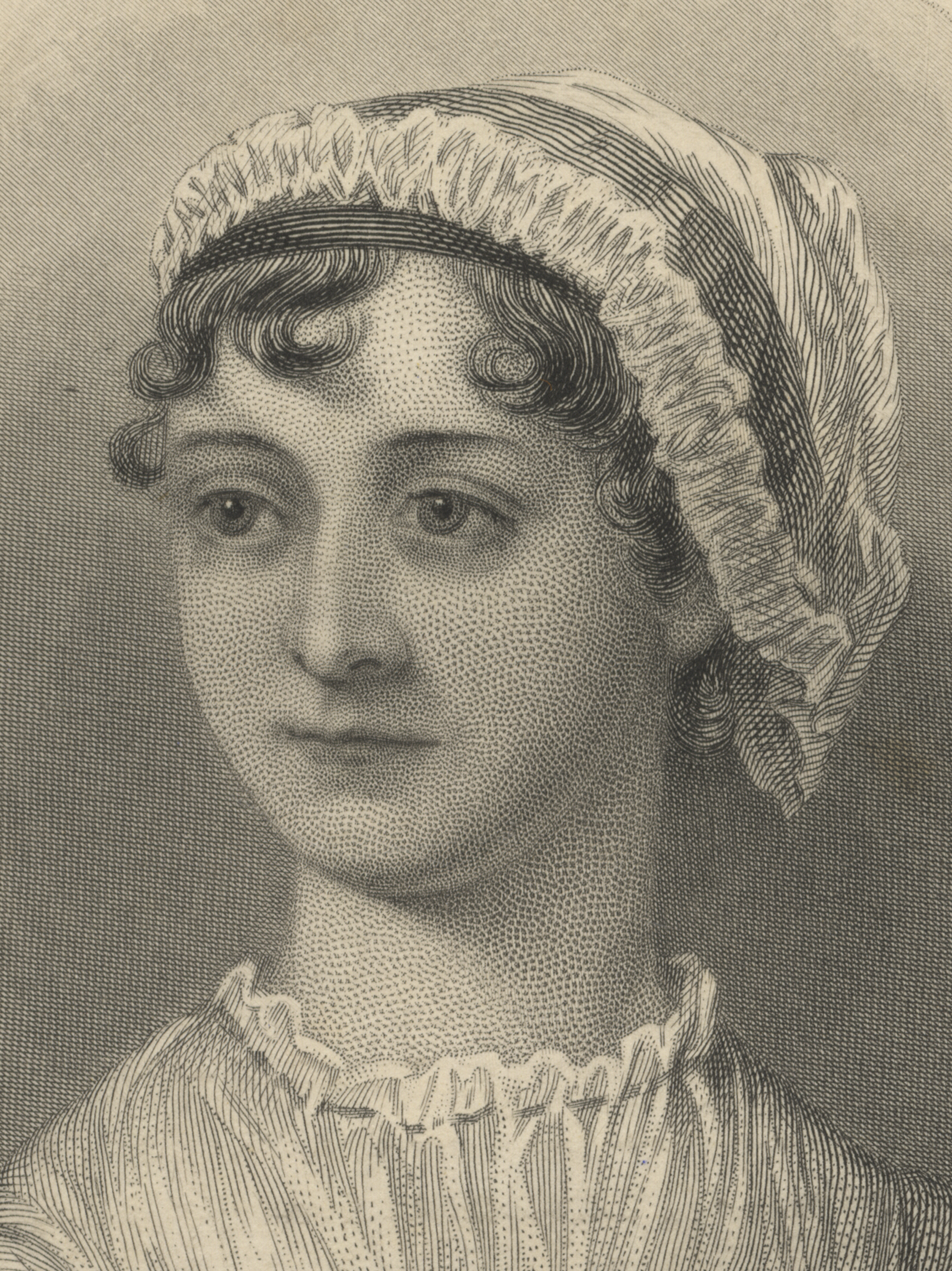
Jane Austen

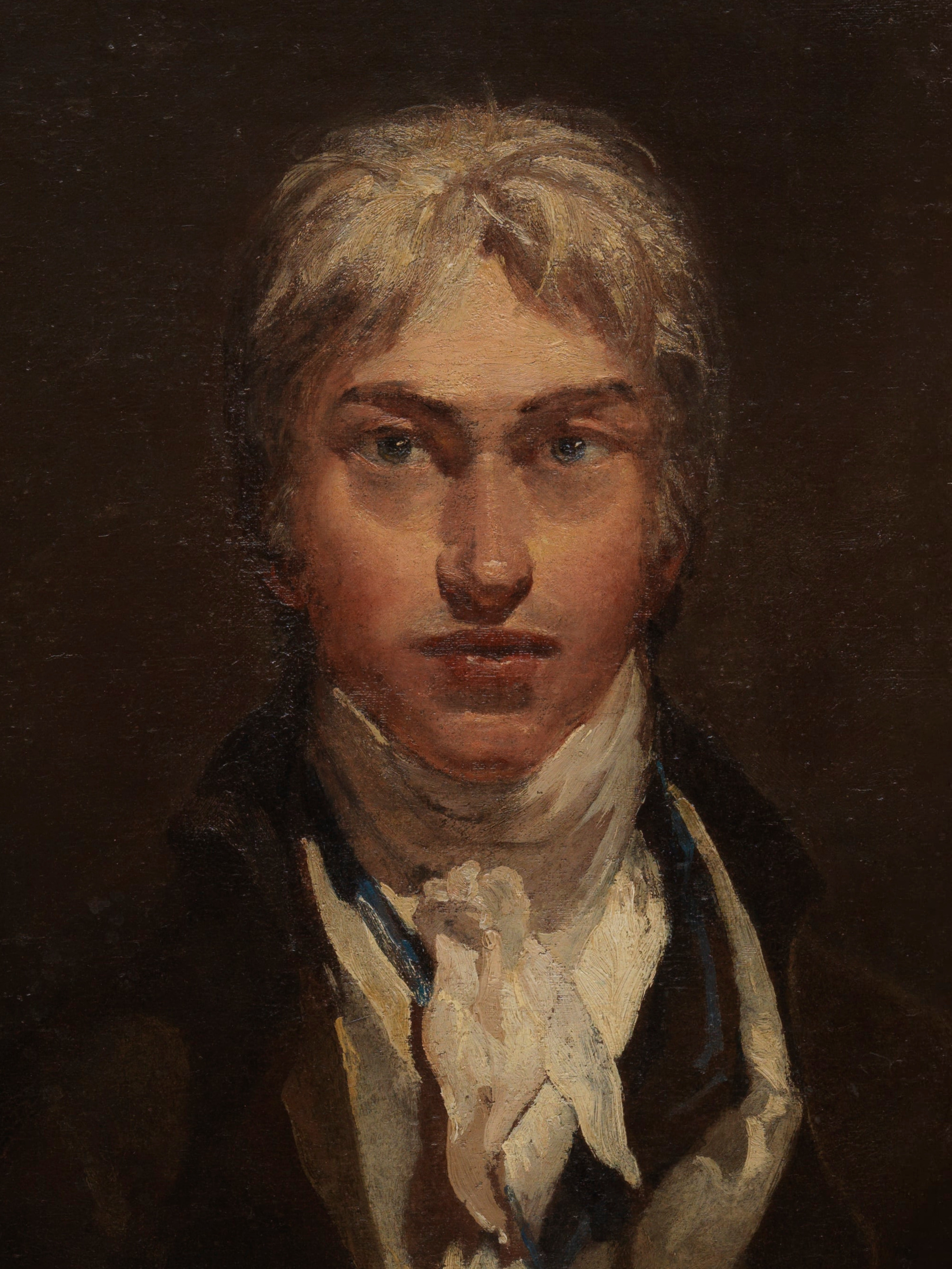
J. M. W. Turner

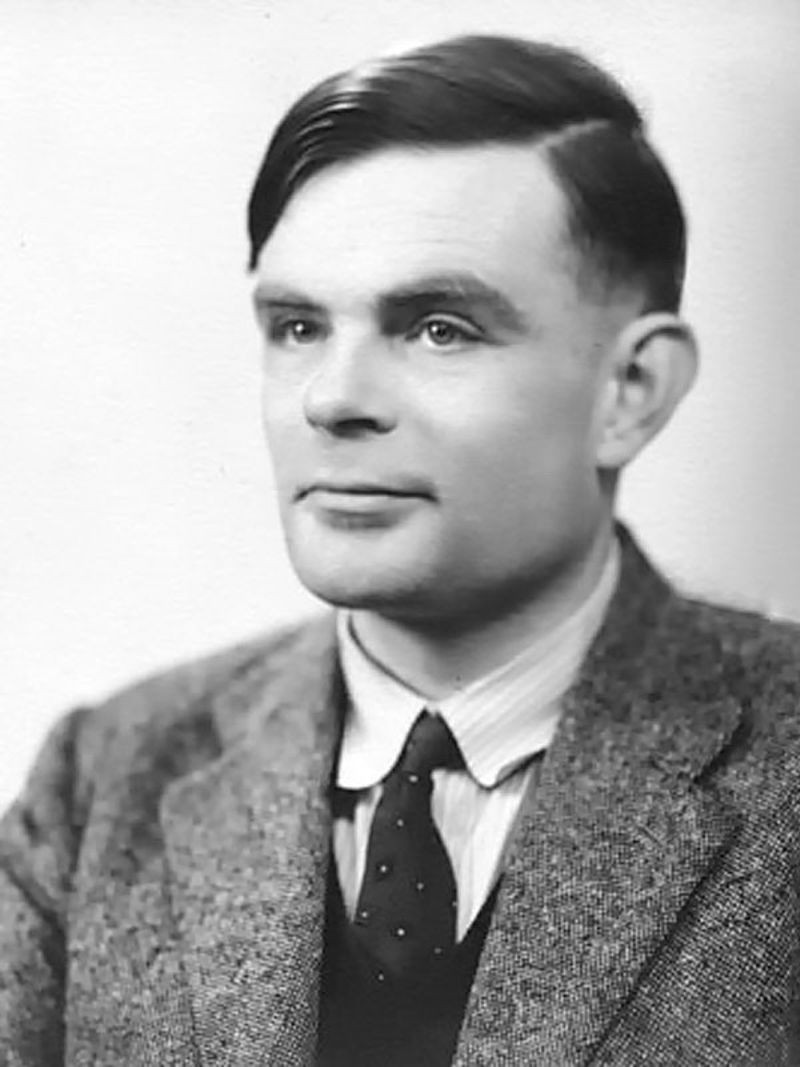
Alan Turing

In 2011, the Bank of England announced plans to begin introducing a new set of banknotes, which were to become Series G. As part of the initial consultation, the bank obtained opinion on whether the planned new banknotes should continue to be made from banknote paper, or if they should be polymer. Having made the decision to switch to polymer banknotes, the first note of Series G, the polymer £5 note, entered circulation on 13 September 2016; the £10 note on 14 September 2017; the £20 note on 20 February 2020; and the £50 on 23 June 2021. The material used to make the banknotes is biaxially oriented polypropylene.

In April 2013, the Bank of England announced that its next planned new note issue, intended to be the £5 note in 2016, would feature former British Prime Minister Winston Churchill. The selection of Churchill to replace Elizabeth Fry raised some debate about the representation of women on British banknotes, with critics raising concerns that Bank of England notes would portray exclusively male figures, other than Elizabeth II who appears on every sterling coin and Bank of England note. In July 2013 it was announced that the Series F £10 note design would bear a portrait of 19th century author Jane Austen. In 2015, the Bank announced that they were accepting suggestions from the public for a figure from the visual arts to appear on the £20 note to replace Adam Smith, with the new note to be introduced in 2020. In April 2016, it was announced that J. M. W. Turner had been selected to appear on the new £20 note.

In September 2013 the Bank of England opened a period of public consultation about the introduction of polymer, or plastic, banknotes, which would be introduced into circulation from 2016 if the proposals were supported. The polymer notes will be "around 15% smaller" than the notes being replaced. Following the consultation, in December 2013, the Bank confirmed that plastic or polymer notes would be brought into circulation in 2016 with the introduction of the £5 note featuring Sir Winston Churchill. A spokesman for LINK, the company that operates many of the cash machines in the United Kingdom, said there would need to be significant investment as machines would need to be altered to fit the polymer £5 banknotes, which would be smaller than the previous ones. The Jane Austen polymer £10 note went into circulation in September 2017. The £20 shows J. M. W. Turner (from a self-portrait), the quote "Light is therefore colour" from an 1818 lecture by Turner, and a view of The Fighting Temeraire.

In March 2018, the Treasury began a consultation looking at the potential withdrawal of the £50 note, as well as the one and two pence coins, on the basis that they are used significantly less than other denominations, with an additional rationale over the £50 note being the perception in the UK of its use in money laundering, tax evasion and other financial crime, despite the demand for it overseas. The Series F version was introduced in 2011, while its predecessor was in circulation for twenty years, so there was some consideration to withdrawing the £50 note entirely as a way of combatting tax evasion, and the fact that cash transactions using such a high value note are becoming increasingly rare. However, in October 2018 the Bank of England announced plans to introduce a Series G polymer £50 note, following the review by the government. The new £50 note is planned for introduction once the Series G £20 note featuring J. M. W. Turner is released. In July 2019, it was announced that the new note would feature computer pioneer Alan Turing, from a photograph taken by the Elliott & Fry photographic studio in 1951, a table of formulae from Turing's 1936 work On Computable Numbers, with an application to the Entscheidungsproblem, an image of the Automatic Computing Engine Pilot machine, technical drawings of the British bombe machine, the quote "This is only a foretaste of what is to come, and only the shadow of what is going to be" from an interview Turing gave to The Times on 11 June 1949, and a ticker tape showing Turing's date of birth in binary code.

=== UK wildlife and birds ===
==== Series H ====
On 2 July 2025, the Bank of England launched a consultation intended to garner public views of what should appear on the next planned series of banknotes. This opened the possibility that the use of historical figures, the choice of whom for individual series has sometimes proven controversial, may be ended. Various subjects were suggested by the Bank, including architecture and landmarks; art, culture and sport; noteworthy events from British history; innovation; or nature, wildlife and birds or natural landscapes. The choice of retaining historical figures was also suggested. On 11 March 2026, The Bank of England announced that British wildlife and British birds would feature on new Bank of England notes, after 60% of respondents in the consultation supported the theme. A further public consultation will invite suggestions for the specific animals to be depicted.

=== High-value notes ===
Not since 1945 have notes with a higher value than £50 been issued for general circulation by the Bank of England, although banks in Channel Islands, Scotland and Northern Ireland still use £100 notes. However, the Bank of England does produce higher-value notes that are used to maintain parity with Scottish and Northern Irish notes. Banknotes issued by Scottish and Northern Irish banks have to be backed pound for pound by Bank of England notes (other than a small amount representing the currency in circulation in 1845), and special £1 million and £100 million notes are used for this purpose. Their design is based on the old Series A notes.

== Scotland and Northern Ireland ==
While provincial banks in England and Wales lost the right to issue paper currency altogether, the practice of private banknote issue has continued in Scotland and Northern Ireland. The right of Scottish banks to issue notes is popularly attributed to the author Sir Walter Scott, who, in 1826, waged a campaign to retain Scottish banknotes under the pseudonym Malachi Malagrowther. Scott feared that the limitation on private banknotes proposed with the Bankers (Scotland) Act 1826 would have adverse economic consequences if enacted in Scotland because gold and silver were scarce and Scottish commerce relied on small notes as the principal medium of circulating money. His action eventually halted the abolition of private banknotes in Scotland.

Scottish and Northern Irish banknotes are unusual, firstly because they are issued by retail banks, not central banks, and secondly, as they are technically not legal tender anywhere in the UK – not even in Scotland or Northern Ireland – as they are in fact promissory notes.

Six retail banks have the authority of HM Treasury to issue sterling banknotes as currency. Despite this, the notes can be refused at the discretion of recipients in England and Wales, and are often not accepted by banks and exchange bureaus outside the United Kingdom. This is particularly true in the case of the Royal Bank of Scotland £1 note, which is the only £1 note to remain in circulation in the UK.

In 2000, the European Central Bank indicated that, should the United Kingdom join the Euro, Scottish banks (and, by extension, Northern Irish banks) would have to cease banknote issue. During the 2008 financial crisis, the future of private banknotes in the United Kingdom was uncertain as several banks were rescued from collapse by the United Kingdom government. The Banking Act 2009 was passed to improve protection for holders of banknotes issued by the authorised banks, so that the notes would have the same level of guaranteed value to that of Bank of England notes. Critics of the 2009 Act expressed concerns that it would restrict the issue of banknotes by commercial banks in Scotland and Northern Ireland by removing many of the provisions of the earlier Acts quoted above. Under the original proposals, banks would have been forced to lodge sterling funds with the Bank of England to cover private note issue for a full week, rather than over a weekend, thereby losing four days' interest and making banknote production financially unviable. Following negotiations among the UK Treasury, the Bank of England and the Scottish banks, it was agreed that the funds would earn interest, allowing them to continue to issue their own notes.

During the public debate leading up to the 2014 Scottish independence referendum, the question of Scotland's future currency was discussed. Whilst the SNP advocated a currency union between an independent Scotland and the remaining United Kingdom, HM Treasury issued a statement in April 2013 stating that the present relationship with the Bank of England could be changed after independence, with the result that Scottish banks might lose the ability to issue banknotes backed by Bank of England funds.

=== Scotland ===
Until 1701 Scotland issued its own pound, the Pound Scots. (Pound Scots paper banknotes, the preceding currency of the Kingdom of Scotland, were the first to be issued in Europe, printed and circulated by the Bank of Scotland in 1696.) With the Acts of Union 1707, the pound Scots was replaced by sterling coin at the rate of 12:1 (£1 Scots = twenty English pence sterling), Today, there is no distinct Scots currency; but Scotland's three largest clearing banks (the Royal Bank of Scotland, the Bank of Scotland and the Clydesdale Bank) issue banknotes denominated in sterling. The issuing of retail-bank banknotes in Scotland is subject to the Bank Charter Act 1844, Banknotes (Scotland) Act 1845, the Currency and Bank Notes Act 1928, and the Coinage Act 1971. Pursuant to some of these statutes, the Commissioners for Revenue and Customs publishes an account of "the Amount of Notes authorised by Law to be issued by the several Banks of Issue in Scotland, and the Average Amount of Notes in Circulation, and of Bank of England Notes and Coin held" in the London Gazette. See for example Gazette Issue 58254 published 21 February 2007 at page 2544.

==== Bank of Scotland notes ====
All Bank of Scotland notes bear a portrait of Sir Walter Scott on the front in commemoration of his 1826 Malachi Malagrowther campaign for Scottish banks to retain the right to issue their own notes. Bank of Scotland's 2007 redesign of their banknotes are known as the Bridges of Scotland series. These notes were introduced on 17 September 2007, and show Scotland's most famous bridges on the reverse side. The Bridges of Scotland series is currently being refreshed with the issue of new polymer notes with designs that follow the same basic theme of "bridges". The previous Tercentenary series notes are being withdrawn from circulation and replaced with the 2007 series (or polymer series as these are issued), but remain legal currency. Following the announcement that HBOS (Bank of Scotland's parent company) would be taken over by Lloyds TSB in September 2008, it was confirmed that the new banking company would continue to print bank notes under the Bank of Scotland name. According to the Bank Notes (Scotland) Act 1845, the bank could have lost its note-issuing rights, but by retaining headquarters within Scotland, banknote issue will continue.

Bank of Scotland banknotes
Denomination	Obverse	Reverse
Tercentenary Series (1995)
£5	Sir Walter Scott	vignette of oil and energy
£10	Sir Walter Scott	vignette of distilling and brewing
£20	Sir Walter Scott	vignette of education and research
£50	Sir Walter Scott	vignette of arts and culture
£100	Sir Walter Scott	vignette of leisure and tourism
Bridges of Scotland Series (2007)
£5	Sir Walter Scott	the Brig o' Doon
£10	Sir Walter Scott	the Glenfinnan Viaduct
£20	Sir Walter Scott	the Forth Bridge
£50	Sir Walter Scott	the Falkirk Wheel
£100	Sir Walter Scott	the Kessock Bridge
Polymer Series (2016 onwards)
£5	Sir Walter Scott	the Brig o' Doon
£10	Sir Walter Scott	the Glenfinnan Viaduct
£20	Sir Walter Scott	the Forth Bridge
£50	Sir Walter Scott	the Falkirk Wheel
£100	Sir Walter Scott	Dr Flora Murray

==== Royal Bank of Scotland notes ====
As of August 2017, the Royal Bank of Scotland is in the process of adopting a new series of banknotes. These will be made of polymer. Two (the £5 and £10 notes) have already been released, whilst a new £20 note is being designed. The £5 note shows Nan Shepherd on the obverse accompanied by a quote from her 1977 book The Living Mountain, and the Cairngorms in the background. The reverse displays two mackerel, with an excerpt from the poem An Roghainn (The Choice) by Scottish Gaelic poet Sorley MacLean. The obverse of the £10 note shows Mary Somerville, with a quote from her work 'The Connection of the Physical Sciences', and Burntisland beach in the background. The reverse displays two otters and an excerpt from the poem 'Moorings' by Norman MacCaig. The obverse of the £20 note, to be introduced in 2020, will show Catherine Cranston.

The previous series of Royal Bank of Scotland notes, originally issued in 1987, remains in circulation, although it is now in the process of being replaced by polymer notes. On the front of each note is a picture of Lord Ilay (1682–1761), the first governor of the bank, based on a portrait painted in 1744 by the Edinburgh artist Allan Ramsay. The front of the notes also feature an engraving of the bank's former headquarters in St. Andrew Square, Edinburgh. The background graphic on both sides of the notes is a radial star design which is based on the ornate ceiling of the banking hall in the old headquarters building. On the back of the notes are images of Scottish castles, with a different castle for each denomination.

Occasionally the Royal Bank of Scotland issues commemorative banknotes. Examples include the £1 note issued to mark the 150th Anniversary of the birth of Alexander Graham Bell in 1997, the £20 note for the 100th birthday of Queen Elizabeth The Queen Mother in 2000, the £5 note honouring veteran golfer Jack Nicklaus in his last competitive Open Championship at St Andrews in 2005, and the £10 note issued in commemoration of HM Queen Elizabeth II's Diamond Jubilee in 2012. These notes are much sought after by collectors and they rarely remain long in circulation.

Royal Bank of Scotland banknotes
Denomination	Obverse	Reverse
Ilay Series (1987)
£1	Lord Ilay	Edinburgh Castle
£5	Lord Ilay	Culzean Castle
£10	Lord Ilay	Glamis Castle
£20	Lord Ilay	Brodick Castle
£50	Lord Ilay	Inverness Castle (introduced 2005)
£100	Lord Ilay	Balmoral Castle
Fabric of Nature series (2016 onwards)
£5	Nan Shepherd	mackerel
£10	Mary Somerville	otter
£20	Catherine Cranston	red squirrel
£50	Flora Stevenson	osprey

==== Clydesdale Bank notes ====
Clydesdale Bank has three series of banknotes in circulation at present. The most recent set of notes, the Polymer Series started coming into circulation in March 2015, when the Clydesdale Bank became the first bank in Great Britain to issue polymer banknotes. The £5 commemorative notes, issued to mark the 125th anniversary of the construction of the Forth Bridge, contain several new security features including a reflective graphic printed over a transparent "window" in the banknote. Further notes in the polymer series will be introduced over time, replacing the previous paper notes.

The polymer notes continue the theme of the World Heritage Series of paper banknotes, introduced in autumn 2009. The new notes each depict a different notable Scot on the front and on the reverse bear an illustration of one of Scotland's UNESCO World Heritage Sites.

Banknotes of the earlier Famous Scots Series portray notable Scottish historical people along with items and locations associated with them.

The Clydesdale Bank also occasionally issues special edition banknotes, such as a £10 note celebrating the bank's sponsorship of the Scotland team at the 2006 Commonwealth Games

Clydesdale Bank banknotes
Denomination	Obverse	Reverse
Famous Scots Series
£5	Robert Burns	A field mouse from Burns' poem To a Mouse
£10	Mary Slessor	A map of Calabar, Nigeria, and African missionary scenes
£20	Robert the Bruce	The Bruce on horseback with the Monymusk Reliquary against a background of Stirling Castle
£50	Adam Smith	Industrial tools against a background of sailing ships
£100	Lord Kelvin	University of Glasgow
World Heritage Series (2009)
£5	Sir Alexander Fleming	St Kilda
£10	Robert Burns	Edinburgh Old and New Towns
£20	Robert the Bruce	New Lanark
£50	Elsie Inglis	Antonine Wall
£100	Charles Rennie Mackintosh	Neolithic Orkney
World Heritage (Polymer) Series (2015 onwards)
£5	Sir William Arrol	Forth Bridge
£10	Robert Burns	Edinburgh Old and New Towns
£20	Robert the Bruce	St Kilda

=== Northern Ireland ===
In Northern Ireland, three retail banks exercise their right to issue pound sterling notes: Bank of Ireland, Danske Bank (formerly Northern Bank) and Ulster Bank. As of 2020, Northern Bank and Ulster Bank are the only two banks that have issued special commemorative notes so far.

Until June 2020, First Trust Bank (formerly Allied Irish Banks and now AIB (NI)) issued their own banknotes but no longer do so.

==== Bank of Ireland notes ====
A Bank of Ireland £5 note

Like other banks in Northern Ireland, Bank of Ireland retains its note-issuing rights from before the partition of Ireland; while Bank of Ireland is headquartered in Dublin, it issues sterling notes within the United Kingdom. In spite of its name, Bank of Ireland is not, and never has been, a central bank; it is a retail bank. Its sterling notes should not be confused with banknotes of the former Irish pound which were in use in the Republic of Ireland before the adoption of the euro in 2001.

Banknotes issued by Bank of Ireland are of a uniform design, with denominations of £5, £10, £20, £50 and £100 each differentiated by colour. The notes all feature an illustration of a seated woman, Hibernia, and the heraldic shields of the Counties of Northern Ireland. Until April 2008, all Bank of Ireland notes featured an illustration of Queen's University of Belfast on the reverse side. A new series of £5, £10 and £20 notes issued in April 2008 depicts the Old Bushmills Distillery and these new notes will gradually replace the previous series as older notes are withdrawn from circulation. In 2019 the Bank of Ireland released new Polymer banknotes with the same design as their paper counterparts but the same size as the Bank of England equivalents.

==== First Trust Bank ====
A First Trust Bank £100 note

Until June 2020, First Trust Bank issued notes in denominations of £10, £20, £50 and £100. The notes bear portraits of generic Northern Irish people on the front with varied illustrations on the reverse. Until 1993 the bank issued notes under its former trading name, Allied Irish Banks.

Denomination	Obverse	Reverse
£10	Generic young man	The ship Girona
£20	Generic old woman	The chimney at Lacada Point, Giant's Causeway
£50	Generic old man	A 1588 commemorative medal and cherubs
£100	Old man and woman together	Spanish Armada

In February 2019, First Trust announced it would stop issuing its own banknotes, with the final withdrawal on 30 June 2020. Any notes still in circulation remained legal currency until 30 June 2022, after which they could be exchanged for other sterling notes at branches of the bank.

==== Danske Bank ====
A Danske Bank £10 note

A Northern Bank £20 note

In 2012, Northern Bank adopted the name of its Copenhagen-based parent company Danske Bank Group and rebranded its retail banking operation. In June 2013 the bank issued a new series of £10 and £20 notes bearing the new brand name; at the same time it also announced that it would cease production of £50 and £100 notes. Older notes bearing the Northern Bank name will continue in circulation for some time as they are gradually withdrawn, and remain acceptable forms of payment in Northern Ireland. In spite of the Danish name on the new notes, banknotes issued by Danske Bank are sterling notes and should not be confused with banknotes of the Danish krone issued by the Danmarks Nationalbank, Denmark's central bank.

Danske Bank does not issue £5 notes, but a special commemorative £5 note was issued by the Northern Bank to mark the year 2000; it was a polymer banknote, printed on synthetic polymer instead of paper. It is the only one of the bank's pre-2004 notes still in circulation; all others were recalled following the £26.5 million pound robbery at its Belfast headquarters in 2004.

Denomination	Obverse	Reverse
£5	"Alpha" (α) motif, Solar System, stars	Stars, globe, electronic circuitry, and the Space Shuttle
£10	J. B. Dunlop	Dome and pediment of Belfast City Hall
£20	Harry Ferguson	Dome and pediment of Belfast City Hall
£50	Sir S. C. Davidson	Dome and pediment of Belfast City Hall
£100	James Martin	Dome and pediment of Belfast City Hall

As of 2019, Danske Bank only issues the £10 and £20 denominations.

==== Ulster Bank ====
An Ulster Bank £20 note featuring the older NatWest arrowheads device

Ulster Bank notes all feature a vignette of three Northern Ireland views: the Mourne Mountains, the Queen Elizabeth Bridge and the Giant's Causeway. Notes issued from 1 January 2007 feature the Royal Bank of Scotland "daisy wheel" logo.

In November 2006, Ulster Bank issued its first commemorative banknote – an issue of one million £5 notes commemorating the first anniversary of the death of Northern Irish footballer George Best.

In June 2018, Ulster Bank announced the introduction of a new series of polymer banknote designs. The new series was designed around the theme "Living in Nature", highlighting Northern Ireland's botanical, zoological and geographical features. The first announced were the five-pound note, featuring images of Strangford Lough, the Brent goose and the fuchsia, was designed using the theme of "migration", while the ten-pound note, which carries the theme of "growth", features Lough Erne, the Irish hare and the Guelder-rose. In August 2019, the design of the new twenty-pound note was revealed, with the idea of Northern Ireland as 'dwelling place', and images including Lough Neagh, the European eel and the Hawthorn flower.

As part of the transfer of the business of Ulster Bank Limited to National Westminster Bank PLC that was completed on 3 May 2021, in 2020 the right to issue banknotes was transferred from Ulster Bank Limited to National Westminster Bank PLC.

== Channel Islands ==
The Channel Islands are grouped for administrative purposes into the Bailiwicks of Jersey and Guernsey. The islands are not part of the United Kingdom but are dependencies of the British Crown and in currency union with the UK. Both Jersey and Guernsey issue their own banknotes. These notes circulate freely between the two territories, so Jersey notes are commonly used in Guernsey, and vice versa. Private banknotes are no longer in circulation in the Channel Islands. These notes are legal tender in their jurisdictions but are not legal tender in the UK.

The Government of Alderney (a part of the Bailiwick of Guernsey) is also licensed to issue its own currency, the Alderney pound, but only mints special commemorative sterling coins and does not issue banknotes.

=== States of Jersey notes ===
The current series of notes entered circulation on 29 April 2010. The obverse of the notes includes a portrait of Queen Elizabeth II based on a photograph by Mark Lawrence, alongside a view of an important Jersey landmark, with text in English. The reverse of each note includes an image of one of Jersey's numerous historic coastal defence towers, built in the late 18th century, as well as a further image of cultural or landscape importance, images of the twelve parish crests, and with denomination worded in French and Jèrriais. The watermark is a Jersey cow, and further security features include a see-through map of Jersey, and on the £10, £20 and £50 a patch hologram showing a varying image of the coat of arms of Jersey and the Island of Jersey on a background pattern of La Corbière lighthouse. On 1 June 2012, a £100 note was issued to commemorate the Diamond Jubilee of Queen Elizabeth II.

Denomination	Colour	Obverse design	Reverse design
£1	Green	Queen Elizabeth II; Liberation Sculpture in Saint Helier	Le Hocq Tower; La Hougue Bie
£5	Sky blue	Queen Elizabeth II; Le Rât Cottage	Archirondel Tower; Les Augrès Manor
£10	Burnt Sienna	Queen Elizabeth II; Hermitage of Saint Helier	Seymour Tower; Lalique sculpture in the Glass Church
£20	Violet	Queen Elizabeth II; States Building	La Rocco Tower; States Chamber
£50	Red	Queen Elizabeth II; Mont Orgueil	Tower, Ouaisné; La Marmotière, Les Écréhous
£100	Purple	Queen Elizabeth II; map of Jersey and Cotentin peninsula	Royal mace of Jersey; Flag of Jersey

The previous series, gradually being withdrawn from circulation in 2010, depicted Queen Elizabeth II on the front and various landmarks of Jersey or incidents in Jersey history on the reverse.

=== States of Guernsey notes ===
The Guernsey pound is legal tender in Guernsey, but also circulates freely in Jersey. It is a sterling pound but the word "sterling" is omitted on banknotes, as on the English ones. Guernsey banknotes can also be exchanged in banks and in bureaux de change, although it has been reported that British banks no longer accept £1 Guernsey banknotes because they no longer have the facility for handling £1 UK banknotes (which are only issued in Scotland).

In addition to coins, the following banknotes are used:

- £1 note, green, Daniel De Lisle Brock, Bailiff of Guernsey (1762–1842) and Royal Court, St Peter Port (1840) on front and the Market, St Peter Port on back
- £5 note, pink, Queen Elizabeth II and the Town Church, St Peter Port on front, and Fort Grey and Hanois Lighthouse (1862) on the back
- £10 note, blue/orange, Queen Elizabeth II and Elizabeth College, St Peter Port on the front and Saumarez Park, Les Niaux Watermill, Le Trepied Dolmen on the back
- £20 note, pink, Queen Elizabeth II and St James Concert Hall, St Peter Port on the front and Vale Castle and St Sampson's Church on the back
- £50 note, light brown, Queen Elizabeth II and the Royal Court House on the front and St Andrew's Church and La Gran'mère on the back

== Isle of Man ==
The Isle of Man Government issues its own banknotes and coinage, which are legal tender in the Isle of Man. Manx pounds are a local issue of sterling, but the word "sterling" does not appear on the banknotes. These notes can be exchanged in banks and in bureaux de change in the United Kingdom.

The front of all Manx banknotes features images of Queen Elizabeth II (not wearing a crown: she was only Lord of Mann on the island) and the Triskeles (three legs emblem). Each denomination features a different scene of the island on its reverse side:

- £1 – Tynwald Hill
- £5 – Castle Rushen
- £10 – Peel Castle
- £20 – Laxey Wheel
- £50 – Douglas Bay

== British overseas territories ==
Three British overseas territories use their own separate currencies denominated in pounds which are at par with the pound sterling. The governments of these territories print their own banknotes which in general may only be used within their territory of origin. Bank of England notes usually circulate alongside the local note issues and are accepted as legal currency.

=== Gibraltar ===
In Gibraltar, banknotes are issued by the Government of Gibraltar. The pound was made sole legal tender in 1898 and Gibraltar has issued its own banknotes since 1934. The notes bear an image of the British monarch on the obverse and the wording "pounds sterling", meaning that more retailers in the UK will accept them.

=== Falkland Islands ===
The Falkland Islands pound is the currency of the Falkland Islands. Banknotes are issued by the Falkland Islands Government. The illustrations on all notes are the same, featuring the British monarch, wildlife and local scenes; denominations are distinguished by the size and colour of the notes.

=== St Helena, Ascension and Tristan da Cunha ===
St Helena, Ascension and Tristan da Cunha's constituent territories of Saint Helena and Ascension Island use the Saint Helena pound. Banknotes in these areas are issued by the Saint Helena Government and bear the image of the British monarch.

== See also ==
- Banking in the United Kingdom
- Bradbury Wilkinson and Company, printer of banknotes, postage stamps and share certificates
- Coins of the pound sterling
- History of banking in the United Kingdom
- List of British banknotes and coins
- List of people on banknotes
- List of British currencies
- Polymer banknote
- Pound Scots and Scottish coinage, currency of Scotland before the union with England

=== Commonwealth ===
States within the Commonwealth of Nations issue their own banknotes which are separate currencies:

- Commonwealth banknote-issuing institutions
