= Bank of Scotland £10 note =

Ten pounds
- Country: United Kingdom
- Value: £10 sterling
- Width: 132 mm
- Height: 69 mm
- Security features: See-through window, raised print, security thread, mask, microlettering
- Material used: Polymer
- Years of printing: 1695–present 2017–present (current design)

Obverse
- Design: Walter Scott
- Design date: 2017

Reverse
- Design: Glenfinnan Viaduct
- Design date: 2017

The Bank of Scotland £10 note, also known informally as a tenner, is a sterling banknote. It is the second smallest denomination of banknote issued by the Bank of Scotland. The current polymer note, first issued in 2017, bears the image of Sir Walter Scott on the obverse and a vignette of the Glenfinnan Viaduct on the reverse.

== History ==
Paper currency was introduced in Scotland immediately following the foundation of the Bank of Scotland in 1695. Early banknotes were monochrome, and printed on one side only. The issuing of banknotes by Scottish banks was regulated by the Banknote (Scotland) Act 1845 until it was superseded by the Banking Act 2009. Though strictly not legal tender in Scotland, Scottish banknotes are nevertheless legal currency and are generally accepted throughout the United Kingdom. Scottish banknotes are fully backed such that holders have the same level of protection as those holding genuine Bank of England notes. The £10 note is currently the second smallest denomination of banknote issued by the Bank of Scotland. Scottish banknotes are not withdrawn in the same manner as Bank of England notes, and therefore several different versions of the Bank of Scotland ten pound note may be encountered although the Committee of Scottish Bankers encouraged the public to spend or exchange older, non-polymer ten pound notes before 1 March 2018.

The Tercentenary series of Bank of Scotland notes was introduced in 1995, and is named for the three hundredth anniversary of the bank's founding, which occurred in that year. Each note features a portrait of Walter Scott on the front. The £10 note has a diamond on the front (other denominations having different shapes) to aid identification for those with impaired vision. The back features an image of The Mound, the location of the bank's headquarters. Each denomination also features a rear design reflecting a certain aspect of Scottish industry and society. On the £10 note the rear design represents the distilling and brewing sector. Three symbols appear on the right-hand side of the rear of the note. These are (from top to bottom) Pallas, goddess of weaving (symbol of the British Linen Bank which merged with the Bank of Scotland in 1971), a saltire with gold bezants (part of the bank's coat of arms), and ship (a symbol of the Union Bank of Scotland which merged with the Bank of Scotland in 1955).

The Bridges series of banknotes was introduced in 2007 to replace the Tercentenary series. The size and colour remain is unchanged, and Walter Scott remains on the obverse. The image of The Mound was moved to the front and a new rear design featuring the Glenfinnan Viaduct appears. The text has been updated to a more modern style and new large, raised numerals act as an aid for the partially sighted.

A new polymer £10 note was issued on 10 October 2017. The new note is the same size as the polymer Bank of England £10 note. It continues to feature Walter Scott on the front, and also features The Mound on both sides, appearing alongside the Glenfinnan Viaduct on the reverse.

== Designs ==
Note	First issued	Colour	Size	Design	Additional information
Tercentenary	1995	Brown	142 × 75 mm	Front: Walter Scott; Back: Distilling and brewing sector	withdrawn 1st March 2018
Bridges	17 September 2007	Brown	142 × 75 mm	Front: Walter Scott; Back: Glenfinnan Viaduct	withdrawn 1st March 2018
Polymer	10 October 2017	Brown	132 x 69 mm	Front: Walter Scott; Back: Glenfinnan Viaduct	

Information taken from The Committee of Scottish Bankers website.
