= Bank of Scotland £5 note =

Scottish banknote

Five pounds
(United Kingdom)
- Value: £5 sterling
- Width: 125 mm
- Height: 65 mm
- Security features: See-through window, raised print, security thread, mask, microlettering
- Material used: Polymer
- Years of printing: 1695–present 2016–present (current design)

Obverse
- Design: Walter Scott
- Design date: 2016

Reverse
- Design: Brig o' Doon
- Design date: 2016

The Bank of Scotland £5 note, also known informally as a fiver, is a sterling banknote. It is the smallest denomination of banknote issued by the Bank of Scotland. The current polymer note, first issued in October 2016, bears the image of Sir Walter Scott on the obverse and a vignette of the Brig o' Doon on the reverse. The polymer replaces a cotton note also featuring a portrait of Sir Walter Scott.

== History ==
Paper currency was introduced in Scotland immediately following the foundation of the Bank of Scotland in 1695. Early banknotes were monochrome, and printed on one side only. The issuing of banknotes by Scottish banks was regulated by the Banknote (Scotland) Act 1845 until it was superseded by the Banking Act 2009. Though strictly not legal tender in Scotland, Scottish banknotes are nevertheless legal currency and are generally accepted throughout the United Kingdom. Scottish banknotes are fully backed such that holders have the same level of protection as those holding genuine Bank of England notes. The £5 note is currently the smallest denomination of banknote issued by the Bank of Scotland.

Scottish banknotes are not withdrawn in the same manner as Bank of England notes, and therefore several different versions of the Bank of Scotland five pound note may be encountered, although the Committee of Scottish Bankers encouraged the public to spend or exchange older, non-polymer five pound notes before 1 March 2018.

The Tercentenary series of Bank of Scotland notes was introduced in 1995, and was named for the three hundredth anniversary of the bank's founding, which occurred in that year. Each note featured a portrait of Walter Scott on the front. The £5 note had a circle on the front (other denominations having different shapes) to aid identification for those with impaired vision. The back featured an image of The Mound, the location of the bank's headquarters. Each denomination also featured a rear design reflecting a certain aspect of Scottish industry and society. On the £5 note the rear design represented the oil and energy industry. Three symbols appeared on the right-hand side of the rear of the note. These are (from top to bottom) Pallas, goddess of weaving (symbol of the British Linen Bank which merged with the Bank of Scotland in 1971), a saltire with gold bezants (part of the bank's coat of arms), and ship (symbol of the Union Bank of Scotland which merged with the Bank of Scotland in 1955).

The Bridges series of banknotes was introduced in 2007 to replace the Tercentenary series. The size and colour remain was unchanged, and Walter Scott remained on the obverse. The image of The Mound was moved to the front and a new rear design featuring the Brig o' Doon appeared. The text was updated to a more modern style and new large, raised numerals acted as an aid for the partially sighted.

In June 2016 the design was unveiled for a new polymer £5 note, which was available from 4 October onwards. The new note is the same size as the polymer Bank of England £5 note. It continues to feature Walter Scott on the front, and also features The Mound on both sides, appearing alongside the Brig o' Doon on the reverse.

== Designs ==
Note	First issued	Colour	Size	Design	Additional information
Tercentenary	1995	Blue	135 × 70 mm	Front: Walter Scott; Back: Oil and energy industry	withdrawn 1st March 2018
Bridges	17 September 2007	Blue	135 × 70 mm	Front: Walter Scott; Back: Brig o' Doon	withdrawn 1st March 2018
Polymer	4 October 2016	Blue	125 × 65 mm	Front: Walter Scott; Back: Brig o' Doon and The Mound	

Information taken from The Committee of Scottish Bankers website.
