= Bank of Scotland £100 note =

One hundred pounds
- Country: United Kingdom
- Value: £100 sterling
- Width: 153 mm
- Height: 81 mm
- Security features: Raised print, metallic thread, watermark, microlettering, UV feature, iridescent band, see-through registration device
- Material used: Polymer
- Years of printing: 1695–present 2022–present (current design)

Obverse
- Design: Walter Scott
- Design date: 2022

Reverse
- Design: Flora Murray
- Design date: 2022

The Bank of Scotland £100 note is a sterling banknote. It is the largest of five banknote denominations issued by the Bank of Scotland. The current polymer note, first issued in 2022 bears the image of Walter Scott on the obverse and Flora Murray on the reverse.

== History ==
Paper currency was introduced in Scotland immediately following the foundation of the Bank of Scotland in 1695. Early banknotes were monochrome, and printed on one side only. The issuing of banknotes by Scottish banks was regulated by the Banknote (Scotland) Act 1845 until it was superseded by the Banking Act 2009. Scottish banknotes are legal currency and are generally accepted throughout the United Kingdom. However, they are not legal tender; not even in Scotland, where only Royal Mint coins are legal tender. Scottish banknotes are fully backed such that holders have the same level of protection as those holding genuine Bank of England notes. The £100 note is currently the largest of five denominations of banknote issued by the Bank of Scotland.

The Tercentenary series of Bank of Scotland notes was introduced in 1995, and is named for the three hundredth anniversary of the bank's founding, which occurred in that year. Each note features a portrait of Walter Scott on the front. The £100 note has three merging circles on the front (other denominations having different shapes) to aid identification for those with impaired vision. The back features an image of The Mound, the location of the bank's headquarters. Each denomination also features a rear design reflecting a certain aspect of Scottish industry and society. On the £100 note the rear design represents Scotland's tourism sector. Three symbols appear on the right-hand side of the rear of the note. These are (from top to bottom) Pallas, goddess of weaving (symbol of the British Linen Bank which merged with the Bank of Scotland in 1971), a saltire with gold bezants (part of the bank's coat of arms), and ship (symbol of the Union Bank of Scotland which merged with the Bank of Scotland in 1955.

The Bridges series of banknotes was introduced in 2007 to replace the Tercentenary series. The size and colour remain unchanged, and Walter Scott remains on the obverse. The image of The Mound was moved to the front and a new rear design featuring the Kessock Bridge appears. The text has been updated to a more modern style and new large, raised numerals act as an aid for the partially sighted.

On 9 May 2022, a new polymer £100 note was introduced to replace the paper notes, featuring Dr Flora Murray on one side and Sir Walter Scott and The Mound on the other. Unlike the paper note, it is turquoise instead of red.

== Designs ==
Note	First issued	Colour	Size	Design	Additional information
Tercentenary	1995	Red	163 × 90 mm	Front: Walter Scott; Back: Tourism	Withdrawn 29th September 2023
Bridges	2007	Red	163 × 90 mm	Front: Sir Walter Scott; Back: Kessock Bridge	Withdrawn 29th September 2023
Polymer	2022	Green	153 × 81 mm	Front: Sir Walter Scott; Back: Dr Flora Murrary	

Information taken from The Committee of Scottish Bankers website.
