= Clydesdale Bank £10 note =

Scottish banknote

Ten pounds
- Country: United Kingdom
- Value: £10 sterling
- Width: 132 mm
- Height: 69 mm
- Security features: See-through window, raised print, security thread, mask, microlettering
- Material used: Polymer
- Years of printing: 1838–present 2017–present (current design)

Obverse
- Design: Robert Burns
- Design date: 2017

Reverse
- Design: Old and New Towns of Edinburgh
- Design date: 2017

The Clydesdale Bank £10 note, also known informally as a tenner, is a sterling banknote. It is the second smallest denomination of banknote issued by Clydesdale Bank. The current polymer note, first issued in 2017, bears an image of Scottish poet Robert Burns on the obverse and a vignette of the Old and New Towns of Edinburgh on the reverse.

== History ==
Clydesdale Bank began issuing £10 notes in 1838, the same year as the bank's founding. Early banknotes were monochrome, and printed on one side only. The issuing of banknotes by Scottish banks was regulated by the Banknote (Scotland) Act 1845 until it was superseded by the Banking Act 2009. Though strictly not legal tender in Scotland, Scottish banknotes are nevertheless legal currency and are generally accepted throughout the United Kingdom. Scottish banknotes are fully backed such that holders have the same level of protection as those holding genuine Bank of England notes. The £10 note is currently the second smallest denomination of banknote issued by Clydesdale Bank.

Scottish banknotes are not withdrawn in the same manner as Bank of England notes, and therefore several different versions of the Clydesdale ten pound note may be encountered. The "Famous Scots" issue of the £10 note featuring missionary Mary Slessor was introduced in 1997. On the reverse of this note are a series of images connected to Slessor's work, including a map of the area in which she worked and a vignette showing her work with children. In 2006 a version of the Slessor note marking the bank's sponsorship of Scotland's Commonwealth Games team was produced. This note has an alternate reverse displaying a montage of sporting events. The "World Heritage" series £10 note was introduced in 2009. This note featured a portrait of Scottish poet Robert Burns on the front, and the Old Town and New Town of Edinburgh on the back. A new polymer note went into circulation in 2017, replacing previous cotton issues. This new note continued to feature Robert Burns on the front and views of Edinburgh, including Edinburgh Castle, on the back. The Committee of Scottish Bankers encouraged the public to spend or exchange older, non-polymer ten pound notes before 1 March 2018.

== Designs ==
Note	First issued	Colour	Size	Design	Additional information
Famous Scots	1997	Brown	142 × 75 mm	Front: Mary Slessor; Back: Various images	Withdrawn 1st March 2018
World Heritage	2009	Brown	142 × 75 mm	Front: Robert Burns; Back: Old and New Towns of Edinburgh	Withdrawn 1st March 2018
Polymer	2017	Brown	132 × 69 mm	Front: Robert Burns; Back: Old and New Towns of Edinburgh	
