= Clydesdale Bank £20 note =

Sterling banknote

Twenty pounds
- Country: United Kingdom
- Value: £20 sterling
- Width: 139 mm
- Height: 73 mm
- Security features: Raised print, metallic thread, watermark, microlettering, UV feature, holographic feature, see-through registration device
- Material used: Polymer
- Years of printing: 1838–present 2020–present (current design)

Obverse
- Design: Robert the Bruce
- Design date: 2020

Reverse
- Design: St Kilda
- Design date: 2020

The Clydesdale Bank £20 note is a sterling banknote. It is the third largest denomination of banknote issued by Clydesdale Bank. The current polymer note, first issued in 2020, bears a portrait of the Scottish king Robert the Bruce on the obverse and an image of the islands of St Kilda on the reverse.

== History ==
Clydesdale Bank began issuing £20 notes in 1838, the same year as the bank's founding. Early banknotes were monochrome, and printed on one side only. The issuing of banknotes by Scottish banks was regulated by the Banknote (Scotland) Act 1845 until it was superseded by the Banking Act 2009. Though strictly not legal tender in Scotland, Scottish banknotes are nevertheless legal currency and are generally accepted throughout the United Kingdom. Scottish banknotes are fully backed such that holders have the same level of protection as those holding genuine Bank of England notes. The £20 note is currently the third largest denomination of banknote issued by Clydesdale Bank.

The Famous Scots issue of the £20 note featuring the Scottish king Robert the Bruce was introduced in 1971. On the reverse of this note are several images representing a statue of Robert the Bruce, the Monymusk reliquary, Stirling Castle, and a William Wallace monument. The note was updated in 2005 with the bank's new logo on the front, an image of the bank’s new Exchange building. A commemorative issue of the £20 note was produced in 1999 to celebrate Glasgow's designation as that year's UK City of Architecture and Design. This note has a portrait of the architrave Alexander Thomson on the front and an image of Charles Rennie Mackintosh's Lighthouse on the back alongside a representation of the dome of Holmwood House. Another commemorative note was issued in 2006 to celebrate the 700th anniversary of the coronation of Robert the Bruce. This note has Robert the Bruce's coat of arms on the front and a vignette celebrating the anniversary on the back. The World Heritage series £20 note was introduced in 2009. This note also features a portrait of Robert the Bruce on the front, and an image of the model industrial settlement of New Lanark on the back.

On 27 February 2020, a new polymer £20 note was introduced to replace the paper notes.

== Designs ==
| Note | First issued | Colour | Size | Design | Additional information |
|---|---|---|---|---|---|
| Famous Scots | 1971 | Pink | 149 × 80 mm | Front: Robert the Bruce; Back: Various images | Withdrawn 30th September 2022 |
| World Heritage | 2009 | Pink | 149 × 80 mm | Front: Robert the Bruce; Back: New Lanark | Withdrawn 30th September 2022 |
| Polymer | 2020 | Purple | 139 × 73 mm | Front: Robert the Bruce; Back: St Kilda | |

Information taken from The Committee of Scottish Bankers website.
