= Walter Weller =

Austrian-born conductor

Walter Weller (30 November 1939 – 14 June 2015) was an Austrian-born conductor and classical violinist. He made several recordings over the years, founded his own string quartet, and led or co-led several well known orchestras and operas. Weller won multiple awards throughout his lifetime.

== Life ==
Weller was born in Vienna, Austria, where he began taking violin lessons at the age of six. He went on to study at the Vienna Hochschule für Musik and first gained renown as a prodigy on the violin. His father, also named Walter Weller, was a violinist in the Vienna Philharmonic. At age 17, Weller became a member of both the Vienna Philharmonic and the Vienna State Opera Orchestras. In 1961, at age 22, he became joint concertmaster of the Vienna Philharmonic with Willi Boskovsky, and remained in this post for 11 years.

While leading the orchestra, Weller also established and led his own string quartet, the Weller Quartet, from 1958 to 1969. In 1966, he married Elisabeth Samohyl, and the couple had a son.

Weller's first engagements as a conductor were in 1966, deputising at short notice for Karl Böhm. His conducting debut at the Vienna State Opera was in 1969, leading Die Entführung aus dem Serail. He later served as Generalmusikdirektor (GMD) of Duisburg, Germany, for the 1971–1972 season. From 1975 to 1978, he was principal conductor of the Niederösterreichischen Tonkünstlerorchester. From 1994 to 1997, he was chief conductor of the Basel Symphony Orchestra, the last conductor with that title before the orchestra joined with the Radio Symphony Orchestra Basel to form the Sinfonieorchester Basel, and in parallel, was GMD in Basel. He also served as principal guest conductor of the Spanish National Orchestra from 1987 until 2002. Weller served as music director of the National Orchestra of Belgium from 2007 to 2012, at which time he became honorary conductor of the orchestra. In 2010, he became the first honorary conductor of the Trondheim Symphony Orchestra. He also became Conductor Laureate of the Stuttgart Philharmonic Orchestra and Associate Director of the Valencia Orchestra.

In Great Britain, Weller held several principal conductorships. From 1977 to 1980, he was principal conductor of the Royal Liverpool Philharmonic Orchestra. He then held the same post with the Royal Philharmonic Orchestra from 1980 to 1986. In 1992, he became principal conductor of the Scottish National Orchestra, and helped to mediate strained relations between the orchestra's musicians and management at the time. He served as the SNO's principal conductor until 1997, and subsequently became the orchestra's Conductor Emeritus.

== Recordings ==
The Weller Quartet's recordings for Decca Records included Haydn’s complete Op 33, Mozart, Beethoven, Brahms, Berg and Shostakovich.

Weller's recording début as a conductor was with the Vienna orchestra in operatic excerpts sung by Pilar Lorengar. His next was directing the Suisse Romande Orchestra in Shostakovich's Symphony No. 1 and Symphony No. 9. His recordings of the Beethoven, Mendelssohn and Prokofiev symphony cycles have long remained available on LP and CD. In 2025 he recordings for Decca were gathered in a 20-CD box set and re-issued by Eloquence, which included the Prokofiev, a Mozart violin concerto cycle with Mayumi Fujikawa, a Bartók piano concerto cycle with Pascal Rogé, Má vlast, and Brahms Hungarian Dances. In the studio his preference was ensuring complete movements were recorded in one take, to avoid editing in small sections.

== Recognition ==
Weller was awarded the Grand Decoration of Honour in Silver for services to the Republic of Austria in 1998. He was also the recipient of the Mozart Interpretationspreis, Salzburg. In Vienna, he was awarded the "Golden Beethoven Medal".

The Bank of Scotland honored Weller by printing his portrait on a special 50 pound note.

Weller was thanked in the acknowledgements to Jilly Cooper's novel Appassionata, due to his support to her research.

== Sources ==
- The Gramophone, February 1973
