= Clydesdale Bank £5 note =

Scottish banknote

Five pounds
- Country: United Kingdom
- Value: £5 sterling
- Width: 125 mm
- Height: 65 mm
- Security features: Clear window, raised print, iridescence, colour-changing ink, microtext, UV printing, see-through registration device (paper issue)
- Material used: Polymer
- Years of printing: 1838–present 2015–present (current design)

Obverse
- Design: William Arrol
- Design date: 2015

Reverse
- Design: Forth Bridge
- Design date: 2015

The Clydesdale Bank £5 note, also known informally as a fiver, is a sterling banknote. It is the smallest denomination of banknote issued by Clydesdale Bank. The current polymer note, first issued in 2015, bears an image of engineer William Arrol on the obverse and an image of the Forth Bridge on the reverse. It was the first fully polymer banknote to go into circulation in the United Kingdom.

== History ==
Clydesdale Bank began issuing £5 notes in 1838, the same year as the bank's founding. Early banknotes were monochrome, and printed on one side only. The issuing of banknotes by Scottish banks was regulated by the Banknote (Scotland) Act 1845 until it was superseded by the Banking Act 2009. Though not strictly legal tender in Scotland, Scottish banknotes are nevertheless legal currency and are generally accepted throughout the United Kingdom. Scottish banknotes are fully backed such that holders have the same level of protection as those holding genuine Bank of England notes. The £5 note is currently the smallest denomination of banknote issued by Clydesdale Bank.

Scottish banknotes are not withdrawn in the same manner as Bank of England notes, and therefore several different versions of the Clydesdale five pound note may be encountered, although the Committee of Scottish Bankers encouraged the public to spend or exchange older, non-polymer five pound notes before 1 March 2018. The "Famous Scots" issue of the £5 note featuring Scottish poet Robert Burns was introduced in 1971. On the reverse are images of a field mouse and wild roses, inspired by two of Burns' poems. A "World Heritage" series £5 note was introduced in 2009. This note features a portrait of biologist Alexander Fleming on the front, and an image of the World Heritage Site of St Kilda on the back. In 2015 a new polymer note was introduced, featuring an image of the Forth Bridge on the reverse and a portrait of William Arrol, whose firm constructed the bridge, on the obverse. This note was the first British banknote to be made entirely from polymer.

== Designs ==
Note	First issued	Colour	Size	Design	Additional information
Famous Scots	1971	Blue	135 × 70 mm	Front: Robert Burns; Back: Various images	Withdrawn 1st March 2018
World Heritage	2009	Blue	135 × 70 mm	Front: Alexander Fleming; Back: St Kilda	Withdrawn 1st March 2018
Polymer	2015	Blue	125 × 65 mm	Front: William Arrol; Back: Forth Bridge	

Information taken from The Committee of Scottish Bankers website.
