= Clydesdale Bank £50 note =

Fifty pounds
- Country: United Kingdom
- Value: £50 sterling
- Width: 156 mm
- Height: 85 mm
- Security features: Raised print, metallic thread, watermark, microlettering, UV feature, holographic feature, see-through registration device
- Material used: Cotton
- Years of printing: 2009–2015

Obverse
- Design: Elsie Inglis
- Design date: 2009

Reverse
- Design: Antonine Wall
- Design date: 2009

The Clydesdale Bank £50 note was a sterling banknote. Until its withdrawal it was the second largest denomination of banknote issued by the Clydesdale Bank. The last cotton note, first issued in 2009 bears a portrait of Elsie Inglis, founder of the Scottish Women's Hospitals, on the obverse and an image of the Antonine Wall on the reverse.

== History ==
The Clydesdale Bank began issuing banknotes (although not in £50 denominations) in 1838, the same year as the bank's founding. Early banknotes were monochrome, and printed on one side only. The issuing of banknotes by Scottish banks was regulated by the Banknote (Scotland) Act 1845 until it was superseded by the Banking Act 2009. Though strictly not legal tender in Scotland, Scottish banknotes are nevertheless legal currency and are generally accepted throughout the United Kingdom. Scottish banknotes are fully backed such that holders have the same level of protection as those holding genuine Bank of England notes. The £50 note was the second largest denomination of banknote issued by the Clydesdale Bank.

The Famous Scots issue of the £50 note featuring economist Adam Smith was introduced in 1981. On the reverse of this note are several images representing engineering and agricultural machinery in the eighteenth century. The current World Heritage series £50 note was introduced in 2009. This note features a portrait of Elsie Inglis on the front, and an image of the Antonine Wall on the back.

The Clydesdale Bank £50 note was withdrawn from circulation on 30 September 2022. At present no successor polymer note has been issued.

== Designs ==
Note	First issued	Colour	Size	Design	Additional information
Famous Scots	1981	Green	156 × 85 mm	Front: Adam Smith; Back: Various images	Withdrawn 30th September 2022
World Heritage	2009	Green	156 × 85 mm	Front: Elsie Inglis; Back: Antonine Wall	Withdrawn 30th September 2022

Information taken from The Committee of Scottish Bankers website.
