= Bank of Scotland £50 note =

Fifty pounds
- Country: United Kingdom (Scotland only)
- Value: £50 sterling
- Width: 146 mm
- Height: 77 mm
- Security features: Raised print, metallic thread, watermark, microlettering, UV feature, iridescent band, see-through registration device
- Material used: Polymer
- Years of printing: 1695–present 2021–present (current design)

Obverse
- Design: Walter Scott
- Design date: 2021

Reverse
- Design: Falkirk Wheel and The Kelpies
- Design date: 2021

The Bank of Scotland £50 note is a sterling banknote used in Scotland, as one of the various banknotes in the United Kingdom. It is the second largest of five banknote denominations issued by the Bank of Scotland. The current polymer note, first issued in 2021 bears the image of Walter Scott on the obverse and a vignette of the Falkirk Wheel and The Kelpies on the reverse.

== History ==
Paper currency was introduced in Scotland immediately following the foundation of the Bank of Scotland in 1695. Early banknotes were monochrome, and printed on one side only. The issuing of banknotes by Scottish banks was regulated by the Banknote (Scotland) Act 1845 until it was superseded by the Banking Act 2009. Though strictly not legal tender in Scotland, Scottish banknotes are nevertheless legal currency and are generally accepted throughout the United Kingdom. Scottish banknotes are fully backed such that holders have the same level of protection as those holding genuine Bank of England notes. The £50 note is currently the second largest of five denominations of banknote issued by the Bank of Scotland.

The Tercentenary series of Bank of Scotland notes was introduced in 1995, and is named for the three hundredth anniversary of the bank's founding, which occurred in that year. Each note features a portrait of Walter Scott on the front. The £50 note has a triangle on the front (other denominations having different shapes) to aid identification for those with impaired vision. The back features an image of The Mound, the location of the bank's headquarters. Each denomination also features a rear design reflecting a certain aspect of Scottish industry and society. On the £50 note the rear design represents Scotland's achievements in art and culture. Three symbols appear on the right-hand side of the rear of the note. These are (from top to bottom) Pallas, goddess of weaving (symbol of the British Linen Bank which merged with the Bank of Scotland in 1971), a saltire with gold bezants (part of the bank's coat of arms), and ship (symbol of the Union Bank of Scotland which merged with the Bank of Scotland in 1955).

The Bridges series of banknotes was introduced in 2007 to replace the Tercentenary series. The size and colour remain is unchanged, and Walter Scott remains on the obverse. The image of The Mound was moved to the front and a new rear design featuring the Falkirk Wheel appears. The text has been updated to a more modern style and new large, raised numerals act as an aid for the partially sighted.

On 1 July 2021, a new polymer £50 note was introduced to replace the paper notes, featuring the Falkirk Wheel and The Kelpies. Unlike the paper note, it is red instead of green.

== Designs ==
Note	First issued	Colour	Size	Design	Additional information
Tercentenary	1995	Green	156 × 85 mm	Front: Walter Scott; Back: Arts and culture	Withdrawn 30th September 2022
Bridges	17 September 2007	Green	156 × 85 mm	Front: Walter Scott; Back: Falkirk Wheel	Withdrawn 30th September 2022
Bridges	1 July 2021	Red	146 x 77 mm	Front: Walter Scott; Back: Falkirk Wheel and Kelpies	

Information taken from The Committee of Scottish Bankers website.
