= Clydesdale Bank £100 note =

Scottish banknote

One hundred pounds
- Country: United Kingdom
- Value: £100 sterling
- Width: 163 mm
- Height: 90 mm
- Security features: Raised print, metallic thread, watermark, microlettering, UV feature, holographic feature, see-through registration device
- Material used: Cotton
- Years of printing: 1838–2009; 2009(current design)

Obverse
- Design: Charles Rennie Mackintosh
- Design date: 2009

Reverse
- Design: Heart of Neolithic Orkney
- Design date: 2009

The Clydesdale Bank £100 note is a sterling banknote. It is the largest denomination of banknote issued by Clydesdale Bank. The current cotton note, first issued in 2009 bears a portrait of the designer and artist Charles Rennie Mackintosh on the obverse and images of the Heart of Neolithic Orkney on the reverse.

== History ==
Clydesdale Bank began issuing £100 notes in 1838, the same year as the bank's founding. Early banknotes were monochrome, and printed on one side only. The issuing of banknotes by Scottish banks was regulated by the Banknote (Scotland) Act 1845 until it was superseded by the Banking Act 2009. Though strictly not legal tender in Scotland, Scottish banknotes are nevertheless legal currency and are generally accepted throughout the United Kingdom. Scottish banknotes are fully backed such that holders have the same level of protection as those holding genuine Bank of England notes. The £100 note is currently the largest denomination of banknote issued by Clydesdale Bank.

The Famous Scots issue of the £100 note featuring scientist William Thomson, 1st Baron Kelvin was introduced in 1971. On the reverse of this note is an image of Lord Kelvin's lecture room. The current World Heritage series £100 note was introduced in 2009. This note features a portrait of designer and artist Charles Rennie Mackintosh on the front, and images of the Heart of Neolithic Orkney on the back.

== Designs ==
Note	First issued	Colour	Size	Design	Additional information
Famous Scots	1971	Red	163 × 90 mm	Front: Lord Kelvin; Back: Lord Kelvin's lecture room	Withdrawn 29th September 2023
World Heritage	2009	Red	163 × 90 mm	Front: Charles Rennie Mackintosh; Back: Orcadian Neolithic monuments	Withdrawn 29th September 2023

Information taken from The Committee of Scottish Bankers website.
