= The Royal Bank of Scotland £10 note =

Sterling banknote

Ten pounds
- Country: United Kingdom
- Value: £10 sterling
- Width: 132 mm
- Height: 69 mm
- Security features: See-through window, raised print, security thread, image transition, UV fluorescence, microlettering
- Material used: Polymer
- Years of printing: 1727–present 2017–present (current design)

Obverse
- Design: Mary Somerville
- Design date: 2017

Reverse
- Design: Two otters
- Design date: 2017

The Royal Bank of Scotland £10 note, also known as a tenner, is a sterling banknote. It is the third smallest denomination of banknote issued by The Royal Bank of Scotland. The current polymer note, first issued in 2017, bears a portrait of scientist Mary Somerville on the front and a pair of otters on the reverse.

== History ==
The Royal Bank of Scotland began issuing £10 notes in 1727, the same year as the bank's founding. Early banknotes were monochrome, and printed on one side only. The issuing of banknotes by Scottish banks was regulated by the Banknote (Scotland) Act 1845 until it was superseded by the Banking Act 2009. Though strictly not legal tender in Scotland, Scottish banknotes are nevertheless legal currency and are generally accepted throughout the United Kingdom. Scottish banknotes are fully backed such that holders have the same level of protection as those holding genuine Bank of England notes. The £10 note is currently the third smallest denomination of banknote issued by The Royal Bank of Scotland.

Scottish banknotes are not withdrawn in the same manner as Bank of England notes, and therefore several different versions of the Royal Bank of Scotland ten pound note may be encountered. The Ilay series of banknotes was first issued in 1987. These banknotes featured a portrait of Lord Ilay, first governor of the bank, on the front. Lord Ilay's image is also used as a watermark on the notes. Other design elements include the bank's coat of arms and logo, the facade of Dundas House, the bank's headquarters in Edinburgh, and a pattern representing the ceiling of the headquarters' banking hall. All of the Ilay series notes feature a castle on the back. On the reverse of the £10 note is an image of Glamis Castle.

The current new polymer £10 note was issued in 2017, and the Committee of Scottish Bankers encouraged the public to spend or exchange older, non-polymer ten pound notes before 1 March 2018. The new design was unveiled in April 2016, and features a portrait of scientist Mary Somerville on the front. Alongside the portrait is an image of Burntisland beach, as well as a quote from Somerville's work The Connection of the Physical Sciences. The rear of the note bears an image of two otters alongside an excerpt from Norman MacCaig's poem Moorings.

== Designs ==
Note	First issued	Colour	Size	Design	Additional information
Ilay	1987	Brown	142 × 75 mm	Front: Lord Ilay; Back: Glamis Castle	Withdrawn 1st March 2018
Polymer	4 October 2017	Brown	132 × 69 mm	Front: Mary Somerville; Back: Two otters	

Information taken from The Committee of Scottish Bankers website.
