= Bank Charter Act 1844 =

Act of the Parliament of the United Kingdom restricting bank powers

Bank Charter Act 1844 (Note: The citation of this act by this short title was authorised by section 1 of, and the first schedule to, the Short Titles Act 1896. Due to the repeal of those provisions it is now authorised by section 19(2) of the Interpretation Act 1978.)
- Act of Parliament
- Parliament of the United Kingdom
- Long title: An Act to regulate the Issue of Bank Notes, and for giving to the Bank of England certain Privileges for a limited Period.
- Citation: 7 & 8 Vict. c. 32
- Territorial extent: United Kingdom

Dates
- Royal assent: 19 July 1844
- Commencement: 19 July 1844 (Note: The Acts of Parliament (Commencement) Act 1793.)
Other legislation
Amended by	Bankers' Compositions Act 1856; Statute Law Revision Act 1874 (No. 2); Currency and Bank Notes Act 1928; Currency and Bank Notes Act 1939; Statute Law (Repeals) Act 1971; Finance Act 1972; Statute Law (Repeals) Act 1973; Banking Act 1979; Banking Act 2009; Statute Law (Repeals) Act 2004

Status: Partially repealed

Text of statute as originally enacted

Revised text of statute as amended

Text of the Bank Charter Act 1844 as in force today (including any amendments) within the United Kingdom, from legislation.gov.uk.

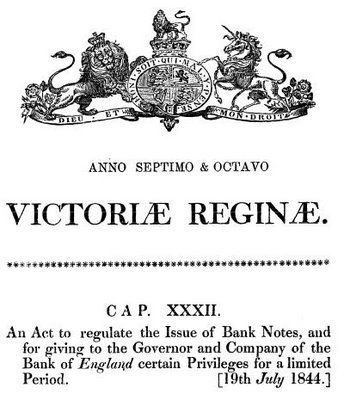
Bank Act of 1844

The Bank Charter Act 1844 (7 & 8 Vict. c. 32), sometimes referred to as the Peel Banking Act of 1844, is an act of the Parliament of the United Kingdom, passed under the government of Robert Peel, which restricted the powers of British banks and gave exclusive note-issuing powers to the central Bank of England. It is one of the Bank of England Acts 1694 to 1892.

== Purpose ==
Until the mid-nineteenth century, commercial banks in Britain and Ireland could issue their own banknotes, and notes issued by provincial banking companies were commonly in circulation.

The Act created a separate Issue Department at the Bank of England and initially set aside £14 million in securities there, together with gold coin and gold and silver bullion, as backing for notes in circulation; silver bullion could not exceed one-quarter of the department's gold coin and bullion. The Act also placed strict curbs on the issuance of notes by the country banks, barring any new "banks of issue" in any part of the United Kingdom and thus beginning the process of centralizing banknote issuance.

The act was a victory for the British Currency School, who argued that the issue of new banknotes was a major cause of price inflation.

Although the act required new notes to be backed fully by gold or government debt, the government retained the power to suspend the Act in case of financial crisis, and this in fact happened several times: in 1847 and 1857, and during the 1866 Overend Gurney crisis.

Also, while the act restricted the supply of new notes, it did not restrict the creation of new bank deposits, and these would continue to increase in size over the course of the 19th century.

Bank deposits are sums of money that a bank, backed by considerable collateral, may choose to deposit in the holder’s account as a loan which requires repayment with interest. The money comes into existence when the bank creates the deposit, and when the loan is paid off, the money disappears from the bank’s balance sheet. While a loan is effectively a cash advance provided by the bank to the customer, in the long term the effect of unrestricted creation of bank deposits (money) can lead to inflation in the markets into which that money is channelled, such as the property market through banks' mortgage lending.

As a result of the act, as provincial banking companies merged to form larger banks, they lost their right to issue notes. The English private banknote eventually disappeared, leaving the Bank of England with a monopoly of note issue in England and Wales. The last private bank to issue its own banknotes in England and Wales was Fox, Fowler and Company in 1921.

The Bank Notes (Scotland) Act 1845 (8 & 9 Vict. c. 38) adopted a year later was more lenient, allowing banks in Scotland to issue more than their 1845 circulation amount, as long as the additional circulation was backed pound-for-pound with gold reserves at head office. Merging banks were also allowed to combine their issues.

Today three commercial banks in Scotland and three in Northern Ireland continue to issue their own sterling banknotes, regulated by the Bank of England.

== Subsequent developments ==
Sections 23 and 24 of, and schedules (B) and (C), were repealed by section 1 of, and the part III of the schedule to, the Statute Law (Repeals) Act 1971, which came into force on 27 July 1971.

In section 1, the words from " subject to the rules " onwards, and section 26 of the act were repealed by section 1(1) of, and part IV of schedule 1 to, the Statute Law (Repeals) Act 1973, which came into force on 18 July 1973.

The Banking Act 2009 abolished the "weekly return" of the number of banknotes issued by the Bank of England: "Section 6 of the Bank Charter Act 1844 (Bank to produce weekly account) shall cease to have effect".

== Outcomes ==
The Cambridge economic historian Charles Read has argued that this legislation reduced Britain's fiscal capacity to pay for humanitarian relief during the Great Famine in Ireland (1845–1852), and that it also made the financial crises of 1847, 1857 and 1866 worse than they would otherwise have been. (More traditional explanations for the UK Government's decisions to withhold relief and intervention are given in the article about the famine.)

== See also ==
- Henry Meulen – a critic who saw the Bank Charter Act as a cause of economic depression and political revolution
- Banknotes of the pound sterling – a list of note-issuing banks in the Sterling area
  - Banknotes of Scotland
  - Banknotes of Northern Ireland
- Fractional reserve banking
- Central bank
