= Harry Eccleston =

H N Eccleston OBE
- Born: 21 January 1923; Coseley, Staffordshire, England
- Died: 30 April 2010 (aged 87); Upminster, Essex, England
- Education: Bilston School of Art; Birmingham College of Art; Royal College of Art
- Occupations: Artist; Illustrator
- Organization: Bank of England
- Known for: Designing banknotes

Harry Norman Eccleston, OBE (21 January 1923 – 30 April 2010) was an artist from Coseley, Staffordshire (now West Midlands), England. He was the first full-time artist and designer of banknotes at the Bank of England.

== Artist ==
He trained at Bilston School of Art, and in 1939, Birmingham College of Art, then later, after Royal Navy service in World War II, at the Royal College of Art. Although he lived in London, Eccleston's interest in his native Black Country continued throughout his life as produced paintings and etchings of the industrial landscape. Eccleston made a number of drawings and studies of the people of the Black Country and the steelworks that he had been exposed to in his childhood. As a perfectionist his drawing are precise and mathematical, making him "one of the finest engravers of his day."

== Banknote design ==
He joined the Bank of England in 1958 as their first in-house artist-designer, and was the designer of the "D" series of British banknotes — the first pictorial notes. They all featured Queen Elizabeth II, as well as Isaac Newton (£1), the Duke of Wellington (£5), Florence Nightingale (£10), William Shakespeare (£20) and Christopher Wren (£50). The notes were issued in 1970 and in use until 1981. Ecclestone retired from the Bank of England in 1983.

== Recognition ==
He was appointed Officer of the Order of the British Empire in 1979. In 2003 he was given an honorary doctorate of arts, by the University of Wolverhampton, for his services to banknote design and printmaking. He was elected as a member of the Royal West of England Academy and as an Honorary Member of the RBSA.

== Art works ==
Examples of Harry Eccleston's work are held in a number of public collections, including the Black Country Living Museum and Birmingham Museum and Art Gallery.
