= Bank of Ireland £50 note =

Bank of Ireland banknote denomination

Fifty pounds
- Country: United Kingdom
- Value: £50 sterling
- Security features: Raised print, watermark, security thread, see-through window, microprinting, UV feature
- Material used: Cotton
- Years of printing: 2013 (current design)

Obverse
- Design: Hibernia
- Design date: 2013

Reverse
- Design: Old Bushmills Distillery
- Design date: 2013

The Bank of Ireland £50 note is a sterling banknote. It is the second largest denomination of banknote issued by the Bank of Ireland.

== History ==
The Bank of Ireland began issuing notes in 1783, the same year as the bank's founding. Early banknotes were denominations of the Irish Pound, but following that currency's abolition in 1826 banknotes produced by the Bank of Ireland were denominated in pounds sterling. These early banknotes were printed by the bank in Dublin, and featured a design with a row of Mercury heads across the top. This basic design remained effectively unchanged for 120 years. Northern Irish banknotes are fully backed such that holders have the same level of protection as those holding genuine Bank of England notes. The £50 note is currently the second largest denomination of banknote issued by the Bank of Ireland.

The £50 note of the Queen's University Belfast Series was first issued in 2004. This issue features a representation of Hibernia on the front, alongside shields of arms of the six counties of Northern Ireland. The back of this note displays an image of Queen's University Belfast. In 2008 a new series featuring the image of the Old Bushmills Distillery on the reverse was introduced, although no new £50 note was issued. Apart from this change of rear design the difference between this series and the preceding series is minimal. The design of the Bushmills series was tweaked in 2013, and a new £50 note was introduced, with slight changes of the front design taking place. The 2013 note also features an image of the Bushmills Distillery on the reverse.

== Designs ==
Note	First issued	Colour	Size	Design	Additional information
Queen's University Belfast	2004	Green		Front: Hibernia; Back: Queen's University Belfast	Withdrawn 29th September 2023
Bushmills (2013)	2013	Purple		Front: Hibernia; Back: Bushmills Distillery	Withdrawn 29th September 2023

Information taken from Bank of Ireland website.
