= Bank of Ireland £100 note =

One hundred pounds
- Country: United Kingdom
- Value: £100 sterling
- Security features: Raised print, watermark, security thread, see-through window, microprinting, UV feature
- Material used: Cotton
- Years of printing: 2005 (current design)

Obverse
- Design: Hibernia
- Design date: 2005

Reverse
- Design: Queen's University Belfast
- Design date: 2005

The Bank of Ireland £100 note is a sterling banknote. It is the largest denomination of banknote issued by the Bank of Ireland.

== History ==
The Bank of Ireland began issuing notes in 1783, the same year as the bank's founding. Early banknotes were denominations of the Irish Pound, but following that currency's abolition in 1826 banknotes produced by the Bank of Ireland were denominated in pounds sterling. These early banknotes were printed by the bank in Dublin, and featured a design with a row of Mercury heads across the top. This basic design remained effectively unchanged for 120 years. Northern Irish banknotes are fully backed such that holders have the same level of protection as those holding genuine Bank of England notes. The £100 note is currently the largest denomination of banknote issued by the Bank of Ireland.

The £100 note of the Queen's University Belfast Series was first issued in 2005. This issue features a representation of Hibernia on the front, alongside shields of arms of the six counties of Northern Ireland. The back of this note displays an image of Queen's University Belfast. Although most of the Bank of Ireland's banknotes were replaced by the Bushmills Series in 2008, new £100 notes are still issued as the Queen's University Belfast Series.

== Designs ==
Note	First issued	Colour	Size	Design	Additional information
Queen's University Belfast	2005	Red		Front: Hibernia; Back: Queen's University Belfast	Withdrawn 29th September 2023

Information taken from Bank of Ireland website.

== See also ==
- Banknotes of Ireland
- Central Bank of Ireland IR£100 note
