= Bank of Ireland £10 note =

Ten pounds
(United Kingdom)
- Value: £10 sterling
- Security features: Raised print, watermark, security thread, see-through window, microprinting, UV feature
- Material used: Cotton
- Years of printing: 2013–present (current design)

Obverse
- Design: Hibernia
- Design date: 2013

Reverse
- Design: Old Bushmills Distillery
- Design date: 2013

The Bank of Ireland £10 note is a sterling banknote. It is the second smallest denomination of banknote issued by the Bank of Ireland.

== History ==
The Bank of Ireland began issuing notes in 1783, the same year as the bank's founding. Early banknotes were denominations of the Irish Pound, but following that currency's abolition in 1826 banknotes produced by the Bank of Ireland were denominated in pounds sterling. These early banknotes were printed by the bank in Dublin, and featured a design with a row of Mercury heads across the top. This basic design remained effectively unchanged for 120 years. Northern Irish banknotes are fully backed such that holders have the same level of protection as those holding genuine Bank of England notes. The £10 note is currently the second smallest denomination of banknote issued by the Bank of Ireland.

The £10 note of the Queen's University Belfast Series was first issued in 2005. This issue features a representation of Hibernia on the front, alongside shields of arms of the six counties of Northern Ireland. The back of this note displays an image of Queen's University Belfast. In 2008 a new series featuring the image of the Old Bushmills Distillery on the reverse was introduced. Apart from this change of rear design the difference between this note and the preceding series is minimal. The design of the £10 note was tweaked in 2013, with slight changes of the front design taking place. The 2013 note also features an image of the Bushmills Distillery on the reverse.

== Designs ==
Note	First issued	Colour	Size	Design	Additional information
Queen's University Belfast	2005	Brown		Front: Hibernia; Back: Queen's University Belfast	
Bushmills (2008)	2008	Brown		Front: Hibernia; Back: Bushmills Distillery	
Bushmills (2013)	2013	Brown		Front: Hibernia; Back: Bushmills Distillery	

Information taken from Bank of Ireland website.
