= Charles Read (British historian) =

English economic historian

Charles Read AFHEA FRHistS FRSA
- Born: London, England
- Occupations: Historian and academic

Academic background
- Education: Christ's College, Cambridge

Academic work
- Discipline: Economic history
- Institutions: Corpus Christi College, Cambridge; Peterhouse, Cambridge; Regent's Park College, Oxford

Charles Read is a British economic historian who teaches at the University of Oxford and the University of Cambridge. He has written three books and used to write and edit for The Economist.

== Early life and education ==
Read was born in London and is of English, Welsh, Armenian and Ethiopian ancestry. He completed his BA, MPhil and PhD degrees at Christ's College, Cambridge with a focus on economic history, with his doctoral research garnering four academic prizes, including a prize from the International Economic History Association for the best PhD dissertation completed in 2015, 2016 or 2017.

== Career ==
Read was a fellow of Corpus Christi College, Cambridge, where he taught economics and history and served as the founding director of its Bridging Course (an introduction to university life aimed at widening participation), "the first of its kind in Cambridge". He also served as Junior Proctor of the university for the 2023/24 academic year.

In 2024 he was elected as Senior Tutor and a Tutorial Fellow in History and Economics at Regent's Park College, Oxford. He is also a Bye-Fellow and a Director of Studies in Economics of Peterhouse, Cambridge. He is also an elected Fellow of the Royal Historical Society and the Royal Society of Arts. Read previously wrote and edited for The Economist.

== Works ==
Read has written three books:

- The Great Famine in Ireland and Britain's Financial Crisis (2022), which challenges the idea that the severity of the Irish famine was the result of British colonialism and laissez-faire ideas.
- Calming the Storms: the Carry Trade, the Banking School and British Financial Crises since 1825 (2023) discusses British financial crises over the past two hundred years, focusing on carry trade and monetary policy. A review of the book in the weekly Cambridge Independent newspaper stated that the book stake a claim for Read to be 'Cambridge's avatar economist for the 21st century'.
- The Financial Crisis of 1847 and the British Empire (forthcoming), under contract with British Academy Monographs.
