= Brig o' Doon =

Bridge in South Ayrshire, Scotland

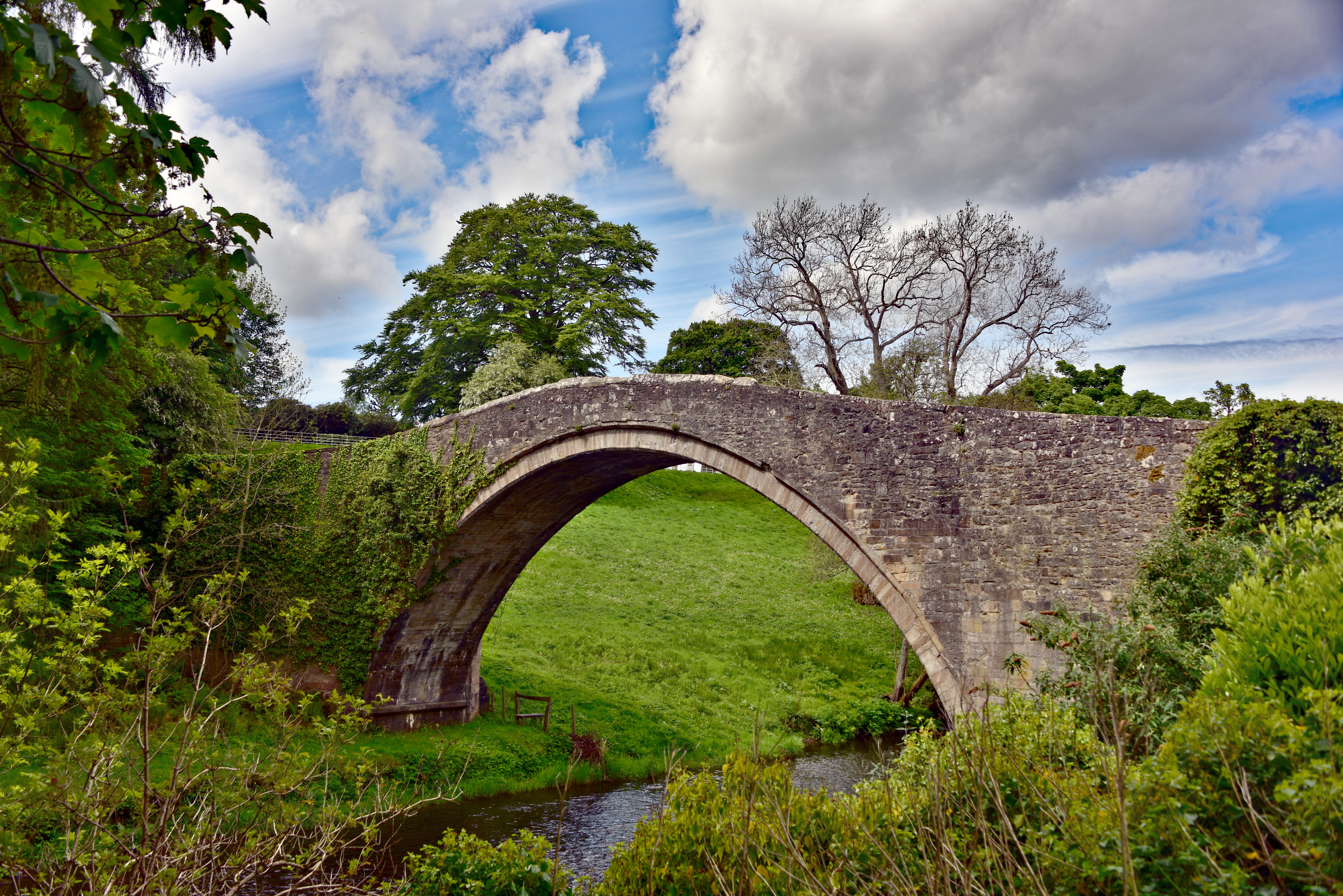
- Coordinates: 55°25′33.460″N 4°38′12″W
- Crosses: River Doon

Characteristics
- Longest span: 72 feet (22 m)

Listed Building – Category A
- Official name: Alloway (off), Brig O'Doon
- Designated: 4 February 1971
- Reference no.: LB21474

Location
- Interactive map of Brig o' Doon

The Brig o' Doon (or Brig O'Doon), sometimes called the Auld Brig or Old Bridge of Doon, is a late medieval bridge over the River Doon in Ayrshire, Scotland, and a Category A listed historic structure.

== History ==
The words auld and brig are Scots for "old" and "bridge", hence the auld Brig o' Doon is "the old Bridge of Doon".

The bridge is thought to have been built in the early fifteenth century. According to John R. Hume, the bridge was built by James Kennedy, who died in 1465, but the first recorded mention was in 1512. The bridge was described as "ruinous" in 1593.

The bridge features on the 2007 and 2016 series of £5 notes issued by the Bank of Scotland, alongside the statue to Robert Burns located in Dumfries.

== Design ==
The bridge is located near Alloway and crosses the River Doon. It is a single arched bridge, with a steeply humped span of 72 ft (22 m) and a rise of 26 ft (7.9 m). It has been repaired many times, most recently in 1978, and many parts of the stonework do not match.

Bridge of Doon Act 1811
- Act of Parliament
- Parliament of the United Kingdom
- Long title: An Act for building and maintaining a Bridge over the Water of Doon, which runs between the parishes of Ayr and Maybole, in the County of Ayr.
- Citation: 51 Geo. 3. c. xxxviii

Dates
- Royal assent: 6 May 1811

Other legislation
- Repealed by: Ayr Turnpike Roads Act 1827

Status: Repealed

Text of statute as originally enacted

The B7024 public road is carried over the River Doon by the New Bridge of Doon, a single-arch stone bridge built downstream of the old one in 1816 to cope with increasing traffic. The old bridge was sold to the builders of the new bridge as a quarry for material, but money was raised to purchase the old bridge back, and the trustees of the new bridge decided to quarry somewhere else.

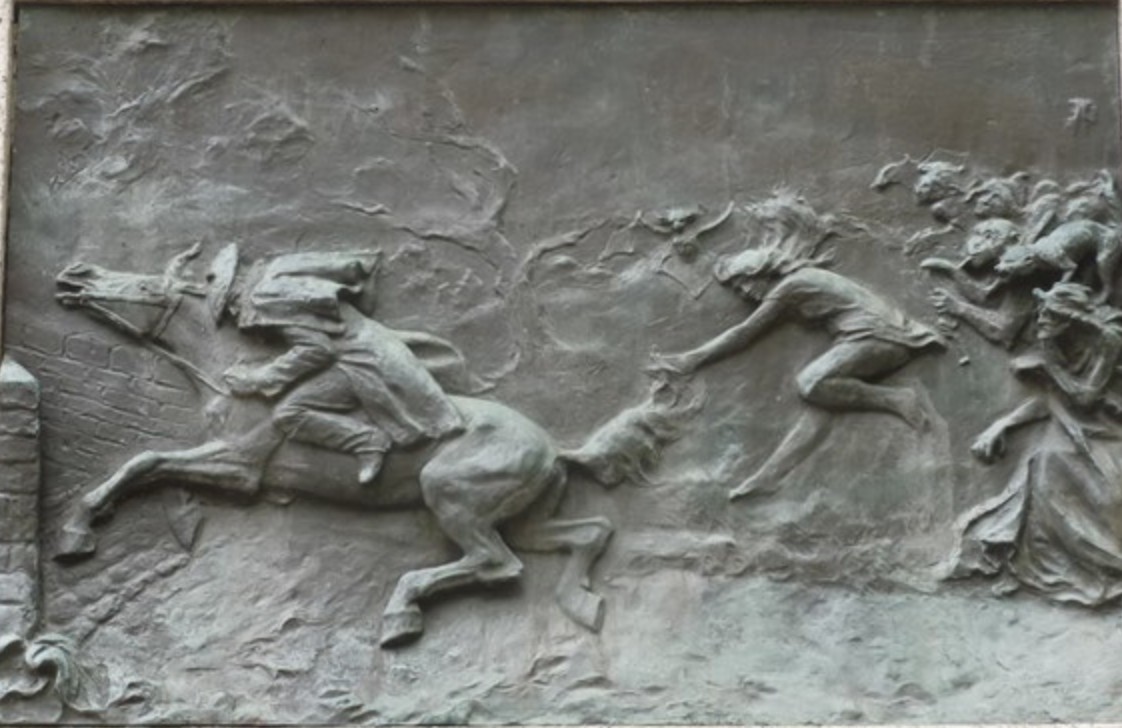
Tam O’Shanter reaches Brig o'Doon, Robbie Burns Statue, Victoria Park, Halifax, Nova Scotia.

The line of the cobbles in the roadway is cranked, due to the belief that this pattern would stop witches from crossing.

== In literature ==
It is used as the setting for the final verse of the Robert Burns poem "Tam o' Shanter". In this scene, Tam is on horseback and is being chased by Nannie the witch. He is just able to escape her by crossing the bridge (over a running stream), narrowly avoiding her attack as she is only able to grab the horse's tail which comes away in her hands:

The carlin caught her by the rump
And left puir Meg wi' scarce a stump.

The Broadway musical Brigadoon also takes its name from this site, though the musical's location is fictional.

== Gallery ==
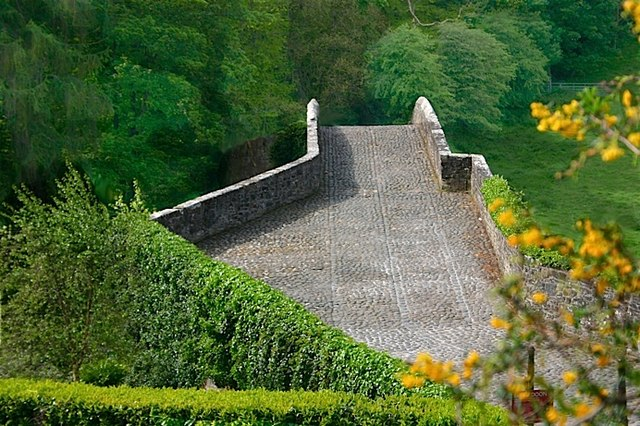
The view over the bridge to the south-west.

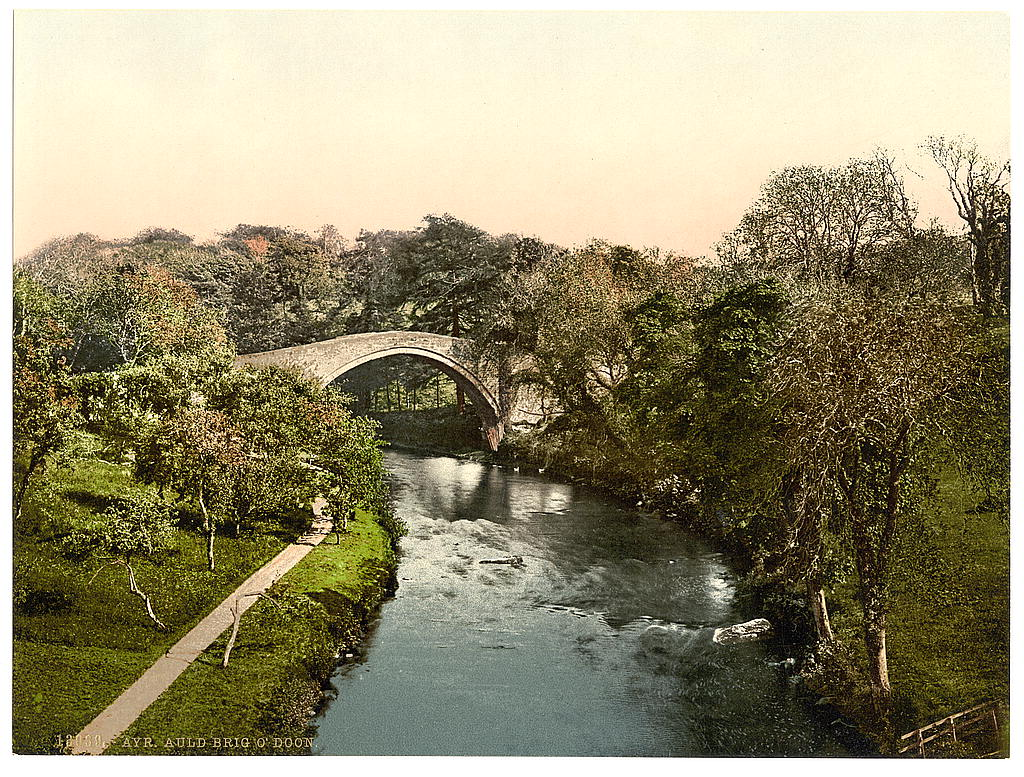
"Auld Brig O'Doon, Ayr, Scotland",
c. 1890 – 1900.

== See also ==
- Banknotes of Scotland (featured on design)
- List of bridges in Scotland
