= Danske Bank £20 note =

Danish banknote

Twenty pounds
- Country: United Kingdom
- Value: £20 sterling
- Security features: Raised print, watermark, security thread, see-through window, microprinting, UV feature
- Material used: Cotton
- Years of printing: 2013–present (current design)

Obverse
- Design: Harry Ferguson
- Design date: 2013

Reverse
- Design: Pediment of Belfast City Hall
- Design date: 2013

The Danske Bank £20 note is a sterling banknote. It is the second smallest denomination of banknote issued by Danske Bank in Northern Ireland.

== History ==
The Northern Bank Partnership was founded in Belfast in 1809, becoming the Northern Bank in 1924. The Northern Bank was acquired by Danske Bank Group in 2005, and took on the branding of its parent company in 2012.

In common with other banks in Ireland in the nineteenth century, the Northern Bank printed its own banknotes. Early banknotes were similar to those issued by other banks, although unlike most other banks, Northern Bank banknotes were always printed on both sides. These early notes were only payable at the branch which issued them, and so required the name of the branch to be printed on them. In the 1860s a new series of notes was produced which featured the names of multiple branches of the bank.

Northern Irish banknotes are fully backed such that holders have the same level of protection as those holding genuine Bank of England notes. The £20 note is currently the highest denomination of banknote issued by Danske Bank. The current design featuring an image of engineer and inventor Harry Ferguson was first introduced in 2013, and is unchanged from the previous issue, except that the note bears the name Danske Bank, rather than Northern Bank. Meanwhile, a polymer note has been issued since July 2020.

== Designs ==
Note	First issued	Colour	Size	Design	Additional information
Ferguson (2013)	2013	Blue	149 × 80 mm	Front: Harry Ferguson; Back: Pediment of Belfast City Hall	

Information taken from Danske Bank website.
