= Currency and Bank Notes Act 1928 =

Act of the Parliament of the United Kingdom

Currency and Banknotes Act 1928 (Note: Section 13(1).)
- Act of Parliament
- Parliament of the United Kingdom
- Long title: An Act to amend the law relating to the issue of bank notes by the Bank of England and by banks in Scotland and Northern Ireland, and to provide for the transfer to the Bank of England of the currency notes issue and of the assets appropriated for the redemption thereof, and to make certain provisions with respect to gold reserves and otherwise in connection with the matters aforesaid and to prevent the defacement of bank notes.
- Citation: 18 & 19 Geo. 5. c. 13
- Territorial extent: United Kingdom

Dates
- Royal assent: 2 July 1928
- Commencement: (Note: Section 13(2).)
Other legislation
Amends	Bank of England Act 1833; Bank Charter Act 1844; Bank of England Act 1861; Bank Act 1892; Currency and Bank Notes Act 1914; Finance Act 1915; Gold Standard Act 1925
Repeals/revokes	Currency and Bank Notes (Amendment) Act 1914
Amended by	Exchange Control Act 1947; Statute Law Revision Act 1950; Currency and Bank Notes Act 1954; Statute Law (Repeals) Act 1973; Criminal Procedure (Scotland) Act 1975; Criminal Law Act 1977; Criminal Justice Act 1982; Currency Act 1983; Fines and Penalties (Northern Ireland) Order 1984; Statute Law (Repeals) Act 2008; Banking Act 2009

Status: Partially repealed

Text of statute as originally enacted

Revised text of statute as amended

Text of the Currency and Bank Notes Act 1928 as in force today (including any amendments) within the United Kingdom, from legislation.gov.uk.

The Currency and Bank Notes Act 1928 (18 & 19 Geo. 5. c. 13) is an act of the Parliament of the United Kingdom relating to banknotes. Among other things, it makes it a criminal offence to deface a banknote.
