= Bank of England £10 note =

Banknote in England and Wales

Ten pounds
- Country: United Kingdom; (predominantly England and Wales)
- Value: £10 sterling
- Width: 132 mm
- Height: 69 mm
- Security features: See-through window with the King's/Queen's portrait with a gold foil patch on the front of the note and silver on the back both in the shape of Winchester cathedral. raised dots, finely detailed bronze opened book shaped metallic image containing the letters "J" and "A", coloured border of a coloured quill shape which changes colour from orange to purple when the note is tilted, silver foil patch, micro-lettering, textured print, UV feature, hologram image in the shape of an open book which changes "Ten" and "Pounds".
- Material used: Polymer
- Years of printing: 1759–1943; 1964–1975; 1975–1992; 1992–2000; 2000–2016; 2017–2022; 2023–present (current design)

Obverse
- Design: King Charles III
- Design date: 5 June 2024

Reverse
- Design: Jane Austen
- Design date: 5 June 2024

The Bank of England £10 note, also known informally as a tenner, is a sterling banknote circulated in the United Kingdom, particularly in England and Wales. (Note: Other £10 banknotes are more commonly used in Scotland and Northern Ireland) It is the second-lowest denomination of banknote issued by the Bank of England. The current polymer note, first issued on 5 June 2024, bears the images of King Charles III and the late Queen Elizabeth II first issued on 14 September 2017 on the obverse, and the image of author Jane Austen on the reverse. The final cotton paper note featuring a portrait of naturalist Charles Darwin, first issued in 2000, was withdrawn from circulation on 1 March 2018.

== History ==
Ten pounds notes were introduced by the Bank of England for the first time in 1759 as a consequence of gold shortages caused by the Seven Years' War. The earliest notes were handwritten, and were issued as needed to individuals. These notes were written on one side only and bore the name of the payee, the date, and the signature of the issuing cashier. With the exception of the Restriction period between 1797 and 1821, when the French Revolutionary Wars and the Napoleonic Wars caused a bullion shortage, these notes could be exchanged in full, or in part, for an equivalent amount of gold when presented at the bank. If redeemed in part, the banknote would be signed to indicate the amount that had been redeemed. From 1853 printed notes replaced handwritten notes, with the declaration "I promise to pay the bearer on demand the sum of ten pounds" replacing the name of the payee. This declaration remains on Bank of England banknotes to this day. A printed signature of one of three cashiers appeared on the printed notes, though this was replaced by the signature of the Chief Cashier from 1870 onwards.

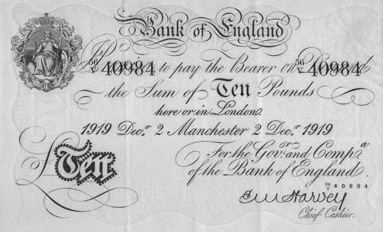
A £10 note, issued from Manchester in 1919.

The ability to redeem banknotes for gold ceased in 1931 when Britain stopped using the gold standard. The £10 note ceased to be produced by the Bank of England in 1943, and it was not until 1964 with the advent of the series C notes that the denomination was re-introduced. These brown notes were the first £10 notes to feature an image of the monarch on the front, and unlike the previous "White" notes they had a reverse; in this case featuring a lion. The C series was replaced by the D series beginning in 1975, with the new notes having a portrait of Florence Nightingale on the back. The tradition of portraying historical British figures on the reverse continued with the E series, first issued in 1992, with an image of Charles Dickens appearing. Series E notes are multicoloured, although they are predominantly orange-brown. From series E onward Bank of England £10 notes feature "windowed" metal thread; this thread appears as a dashed line, yet forms a single line when held up to the light.

The revised Series E £10 note was introduced in 2000. It featured a portrait of Charles Darwin on the back as well as an illustration of HMS Beagle and images of various flora and fauna. The note featured a number of security features in addition to the metallic thread, including raised print, a watermark, microlettering, a hologram, and a number ten which only appears under ultraviolet light. An F series £10 note was never issued.

=== Polymer note ===
In 2013, Mark Carney, Governor of the Bank of England, announced that a newly designed £10 banknote, in polymer, rather than cotton paper, and featuring early 19th-century novelist Jane Austen, would be issued. The date of issue was subsequently confirmed as 14 September 2017. The decision to replace Darwin with Austen followed a campaign to have a woman on the back of a Bank of England banknote when it was announced that the only woman to feature on the back of a note — prison reformer Elizabeth Fry on the £5 note — was to be replaced by Winston Churchill.

Like the £5 note featuring Churchill, the new £10 note is made from polymer rather than cotton paper. It depicts:

- The quotation "I declare after all there is no enjoyment like reading!" from Pride and Prejudice (Miss Bingley, Chapter XI). Austen's character Caroline Bingley, who says this in the novel, in fact has no interest in reading and is attempting to impress Mr Darcy, the book's romantic hero.
- A portrait of Jane Austen, commissioned by James Edward Austen Leigh (Jane Austen's nephew) in 1870, which was adapted from an original sketch of Jane Austen drawn by her sister, Cassandra Austen.
- An illustration of Miss Elizabeth Bennet undertaking "the examination of all the letters which Jane had written to her" – from a drawing by Isabel Bishop (1902–1988).
- An image of Godmersham Park, the home of Edward Austen Knight, Jane Austen's brother. Jane Austen visited the house often and it is believed that it was the inspiration for a number of her novels.
- Jane Austen's writing table – the central design in the background is based on the twelve-sided writing table, and writing quills, used by Jane Austen at Chawton Cottage.

Winchester Cathedral, where Austen is buried, is depicted in gold foil on the front of the note and silver on the back. The note with serial number AA01001817 was donated to Winchester Cathedral, marking the year of Austen's burial, 1817.

== Designs ==
Source: Bank of England

Note	image	First issued	Last issued	Ceased to be legal tender	Colour	Size	Design	Additional information
White		1759	1943	16 April 1945	Monochrome (printed on one side only)	211 × 133 mm (may vary)		Denomination discontinued from 1945 until 1964
Series C		21 February 1964	1975	31 May 1979	Brown	150 × 93 mm	Front: Queen Elizabeth II; Back: Lion	First £10 note to carry a portrait of the monarch and use threaded paper
Series D		20 February 1975	1992	20 May 1994	Predominantly brown	151 × 85 mm	Front: Queen Elizabeth II; Back: Florence Nightingale	Those issued from 16 July 1987 onward have a "windowed" security thread
Series E		29 April 1992	October 2000	31 July 2003	Multicoloured (predominantly orange-brown)	142mm x 75mm	Front: Queen Elizabeth II; Back: Charles Dickens	Those notes issued from November 1993 have an additional denomination symbol £10 on each side
Series E (variant)		7 November 2000	2016	1 March 2018	Multicoloured (predominantly orange-brown)	142 × 75 mm	Front: Queen Elizabeth II; Back: Charles Darwin	The correct wording in the band of text above the central oval where the Queen's watermark appears is "The Governor and Company of the Bank of England". A variety exists with the wording "The Governor and the Company of the Bank of England" (with an extra "the"). This is technically incorrect, however both types were made in high numbers.
Series F	Was never issued							
Series G (I)		14 September 2017	2022		Predominantly orange	132 × 69 mm	Front: Queen Elizabeth II; Back: Jane Austen	
Series G (II)		5 June 2024			Predominantly orange	132 × 69 mm	Front: King Charles III; Back: Jane Austen	First King Charles III note

== See also ==
- Bank of England note issues
