= Bank Notes Act =

Stock short title used in UK legislation

Bank Notes Act is a stock short title used in the United Kingdom for legislation relating to bank notes.

== List ==
The Bank Notes Acts 1826 to 1852 was the collective title of the following Acts:

- The Bank Notes Act 1826 (7 Geo. 4. c. 6)
- The Country Bankers Act 1826 (7 Geo. 4. c. 46)
- The Bank Notes Act 1828 (9 Geo. 4. c. 23)
- The Bank Notes (No. 2) Act 1828 (9 Geo. 4. c. 65)
- The Bank Notes Act 1833 (3 & 4 Will. 4. c. 83)
- The Bank Notes Act 1852 (16 & 17 Vict. c. 2)

The Bank Notes (Scotland) Acts 1756 to 1854 is the collective title of the following Acts:

- The Bank Notes (Scotland) Act 1765 (5 Geo. 3. c. 49)
- The Bankers (Scotland) Act 1826 (7 Geo. 4. c. 67)
- The Bank Notes (Scotland) Act 1845 (8 & 9 Vict. c. 38)
- The Bankers' Composition (Scotland) Act 1853 (16 & 17 Vict. c. 63)
- The Bankers (Scotland) Act 1854 (17 & 18 Vict. c. 73)

The Bank Notes (Ireland) Acts 1825 to 1864 is the collective title of the following Acts:

- The Bankers (Ireland) Act 1825 (6 Geo. 4. c. 42)
- The Bank Notes (No. 2) Act 1828 (9 Geo. 4. c. 65)
- The Bankers' Composition (Ireland) Act 1828 (9 Geo. 4. c. 80)
- The Bank Notes (Ireland) Act 1828 (9 Geo. 4. c. 81)
- The Banks (Ireland) Act 1830 (11 Geo. 4. & 1 Will. 4. c. 32)
- The Bankers (Ireland) Act 1845 (8 & 9 Vict. c. 37)
- The Bank Notes (Ireland) Act 1864 (27 & 28 Vict. c. 78)
- The Bank Post Bills Composition (Ireland) Act 1864 (27 & 28 Vict. c. 86)
- The Bank Notes (Ireland) Act 1920 (10 & 11 Geo. 5. c. 24)

Currency and Bank Notes Act

- Currency and Bank Notes Act 1914 (4 & 5 Geo. 5. c. 14)
- Currency and Bank Notes (Amendment) Act 1914 (4 & 5 Geo. 5. c. 72)
- Currency and Bank Notes Act 1928 (18 & 19 Geo. 5. c. 13)
- Currency and Bank Notes Act 1939 (2 & 3 Geo. 6. c. 7)
- Currency and Bank Notes Act 1954 (2 & 3 Eliz. 2. c. 12)

== See also ==
- List of short titles
