= Banking Act 2009 =

Act of the Parliament of the United Kingdom

Banking Act 2009 (Note: Section 265.)
- Act of Parliament
- Parliament of the United Kingdom
- Long title: An Act to make provision about banking.
- Citation: 2009 c. 1
- Introduced by: Alistair Darling MP, Chancellor of the ExchequerLord Davies of Oldham (Lords)
- Territorial extent: England and Wales; Scotland; Northern Ireland; (Sections 253 and 254 extend to Scotland only); (Note: Section 264.)

Dates
- Royal assent: 12 February 2009
- Commencement: Various (Note: Section 263.)
Other legislation
Amends	Bank Charter Act 1844; Currency and Bank Notes Act 1928; Bankers (Northern Ireland) Act 1928; Company Directors Disqualification Act 1986; Bank of England Act 1998
Repeals/revokes	Bank Notes (Scotland) Act 1845; Bankers (Ireland) Act 1845
Amended by	Digital Economy Act 2017

Status: Amended

History of passage through Parliament

Text of statute as originally enacted

Revised text of statute as amended

The Banking Act 2009 (c. 1) is an act of the Parliament of the United Kingdom that entered into force in part on the 21 February 2009 in order, amongst other things, to replace the Banking (Special Provisions) Act 2008. The act makes provision for the nationalisation of banks, amends the law on bank insolvency and administration, and makes provision about the Financial Services Compensation Scheme. It also makes provision about the regulation of inter-bank payment schemes (e.g. BACS), amends the law on the issue of banknotes by Scottish and Northern Irish banks, and makes other miscellaneous amendments to the law on banking.

== Banknotes ==
Part 6 of the act specifically deals with the right of certain commercial banks in Scotland and Northern Ireland to issue their own private banknotes, repealing the Bank Notes (Scotland) Act 1845, the Bankers (Ireland) Act 1845 and the Bankers (Northern Ireland) Act 1928. The 2009 act empowers HM Treasury to control banknote issue more strictly, requiring commercial note-issuing bank to maintain backing assets so that, in the event of the commercial failure of a bank, the value of their banknotes would be protected.

The Act additionally prohibits the issue of banknotes by any other banks other than those authorised under the 1845/1928 legislation and the Bank of England, and provides that, if a commercial bank decides to discontinue the issuing its own banknotes, it then irrevocably loses its note-issuing privileges.

== See also ==
- 2008 United Kingdom bank rescue package
- 2009 United Kingdom bank rescue package
- Bank Charter Act 1844
- Banknotes of the pound sterling
