= HMS Temeraire (1798) =

Ship of the line of the Royal Navy

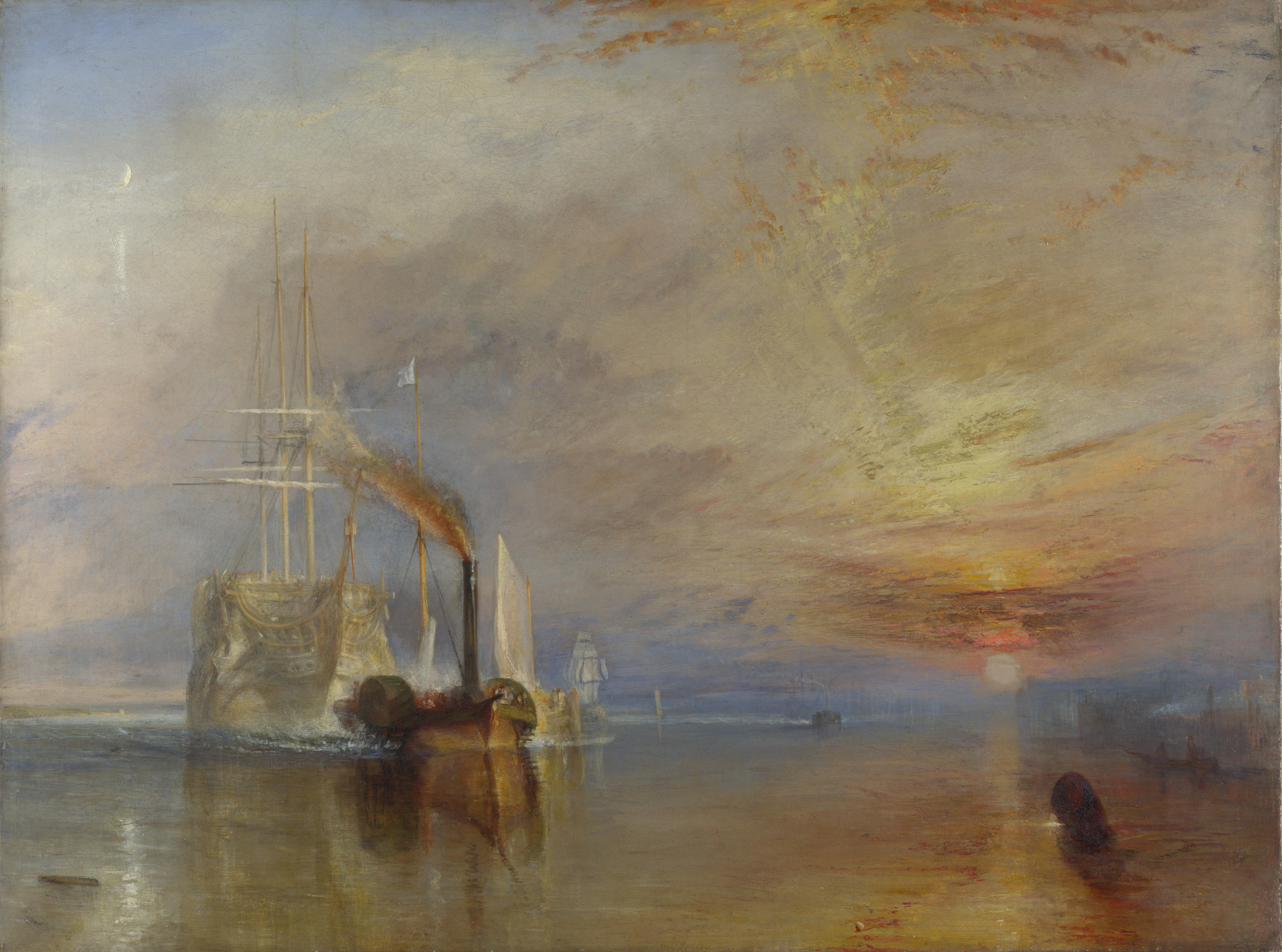
- The Fighting Temeraire tugged to her last berth to be broken up, 1838

History

Great Britain
- Name: Temeraire
- Ordered: 9 December 1790
- Builder: Chatham Dockyard
- Laid down: July 1793
- Launched: 11 September 1798
- Reclassified: Prison ship 1813–1819; Receiving ship 1820–1828; Victualling depot 1828–1836; Guard ship 1836–1838
- Fate: Broken up in 1838

General characteristics
- Class & type: Neptune-class ship of the line
- Tons burthen: 2,12058/94 (bm)
- Length: 185 ft (56 m) (gundeck); 152 ft 8 in (46.53 m) (keel)
- Beam: 51 ft 2 in (15.60 m)
- Depth of hold: 21 ft 6 in (6.55 m)
- Sail plan: Full-rigged ship
- Complement: 738
- Armament: 98 guns: Gundeck: 28 × 32-pounder guns; Middle gundeck: 30 × 18-pounder guns; Upper gundeck: 30 × 18-pounder guns; Quarterdeck: 8 × 12-pounder guns; Forecastle: 2 × 12-pounder guns

HMS Temeraire was a second-rate 98-gun ship of the line of the Royal Navy. Launched in 1798, she served in the French Revolutionary and Napoleonic Wars, mostly on blockades or convoy escort duties. She only fought in one fleet action, the Battle of Trafalgar, but became so well known for that action and the ship's subsequent depictions in art and literature that she has been remembered as The Fighting Temeraire.

Built at Chatham Dockyard, Temeraire began her naval service blockading Brest with the rest of the Channel Fleet. Missions were tedious and seldom relieved by engagements with the French Navy. The first incident of note came when several members of her crew, hearing rumours they were to be sent to the West Indies at a time when peace with France seemed imminent, refused to obey orders. The mutiny eventually failed and a number of mutineers were tried and executed. Laid up after the Peace of Amiens, Temeraire returned to active service following the outbreak of the Napoleonic Wars, again serving in the Channel Fleet and participating in Horatio Nelson's blockade of the Franco-Spanish fleet in Cádiz in 1805. At the Battle of Trafalgar, fought on 21 October, the ship went into action immediately astern of Nelson's flagship, HMS Victory. During the battle Temeraire came to the rescue of the beleaguered Victory, and fought and captured two French ships of the line, winning public renown in Britain.

After undergoing substantial repairs, Temeraire participated in blockades of the French navy and supported British operations on the Spanish coast. She went to the Baltic Sea in 1809, defending convoys against attacks by Danish gunboats, and by 1810 was off the Spanish coast again, helping to defend Cádiz against a French siege. Her last action occurred off Toulon, when she came under fire from French shore batteries. Temeraire returned to Britain in 1813 for repairs, but was laid up. She was converted to a prison ship and moored in the River Tamar until 1819. She was subsequently brought to Sheerness and served as a receiving ship, then a depot ship and finally a guard ship. The Admiralty ordered her to be sold in 1838, and she was towed up the Thames to be broken up.

This final voyage was depicted in a 1839 J. M. W. Turner painting titled The Fighting Temeraire, which was greeted with critical acclaim. The painting was voted Britain's favourite painting in a BBC radio poll in 2005 and appeared briefly in the 2012 James Bond movie Skyfall. A reproduction of the painting appears on the back of the Bank of England £20 note issued in 2020.

== Construction and commissioning ==
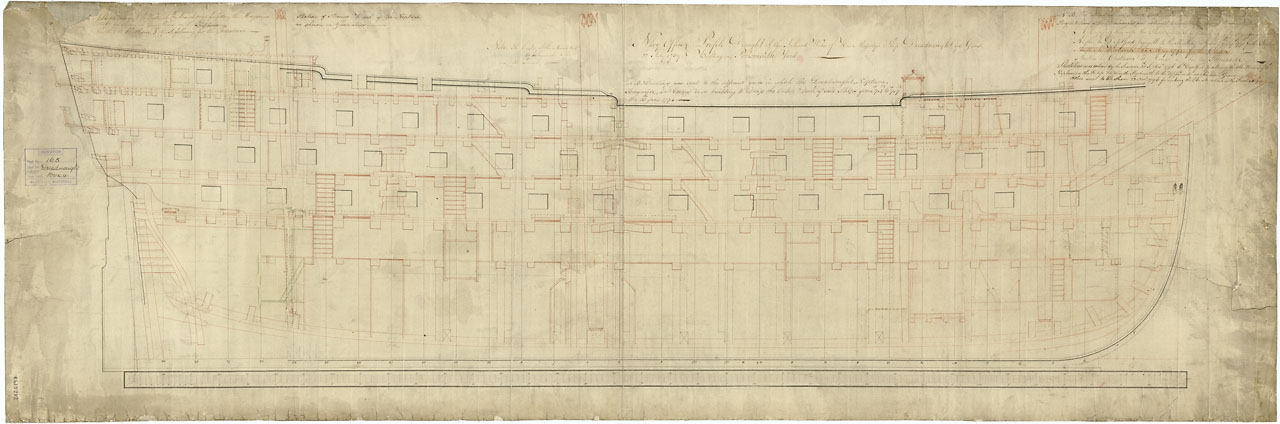
Admiralty plan for a 98-gun ship of the line of the Neptune class. This represents the design for HMS Dreadnought, drawn up by the Navy Office and dated 22 July 1789.

Temeraire was ordered from Chatham Dockyard on 9 December 1790, to a design developed by Surveyor of the Navy Sir John Henslow. She was one of three ships of the Neptune class, alongside her sisters HMS Neptune and HMS Dreadnought.^{[a]}

She was primarily made from English oak from nearby Hainault Forest. The keel was laid down at Chatham in July 1793. Her construction was initially overseen by Master Shipwright Thomas Pollard and completed by his successor Edward Sison. Temeraire was launched in the rain on Tuesday 11 September 1798 and the following day was taken into the graving dock to be fitted for sea. Her hull was fitted with copper sheathing, a process that took two weeks to complete. Refloated, she finished fitting out, and received her masts and yards. Her final costs came to £73,241, and included £59,428 spent on the hull, masts and yards, and a further £13,813 on rigging and stores.

She was commissioned on 21 March 1799 under Captain Peter Puget, becoming the second ship of the Royal Navy to bear the name Temeraire. Her predecessor had been the 74-gun third-rate HMS Temeraire, a former French ship taken as a prize at the Battle of Lagos on 19 August 1759 by a fleet under Admiral Edward Boscawen.^{[b]} Puget was in command only until 26 July 1799, during which time he oversaw the process of fitting the new Temeraire for sea. He was superseded by Captain Thomas Eyles on 27 July 1799, while the vessel was anchored off St Helens, Isle of Wight.

== With the Channel Fleet ==
Under Eyles's command Temeraire finally put to sea at the end of July, flying the flag of Rear Admiral Sir John Borlase Warren, and joined the Channel Fleet under the overall command of Admiral Lord Bridport. The Channel Fleet was at that time principally engaged in the blockade of the French port of Brest, and Temeraire spent several long cruises of two or three months at a time patrolling the area. Eyles was superseded during this period by Temeraire's former commander, Captain Puget, who resumed command on 14 October 1799, and the following month Temeraire became the flagship of Rear Admiral James Whitshed.

Lord Bridport had been replaced as commander of the Channel Fleet by Admiral Lord St Vincent in mid-1799, and the long blockade cruises were sustained throughout the winter and into the following year. On 20 April 1800 Puget was superseded as commander by Captain Edward Marsh. Marsh commanded Temeraire through the remainder of that year and for the first half of 1801, until his replacement, Captain Thomas Eyles, arrived to resume command on 31 August. Rear Admiral Whitshed had also struck his flag by now, and Temeraire became the flagship of Rear Admiral George Campbell. By this time the Second Coalition against France had collapsed, and negotiations for peace were underway at Amiens. Lord St Vincent had been promoted to First Lord of the Admiralty, and command of the Channel Fleet passed to Admiral Sir William Cornwallis. With the end of the war imminent, Temeraire was taken off blockade duty and sent to Bantry Bay to await the arrival of a convoy, which she would then escort to the West Indies. Many of the crew had been serving continuously in the navy since the start of the French Revolutionary Wars in 1793, and had looked forward to returning to England now that peace seemed imminent. On hearing rumours that instead they were to be sent to the West Indies, around a dozen men began to agitate for the rest of the crew to refuse orders to sail for anywhere but England.

== Mutiny ==
On the morning of 3 December, a small group of sailors gathered on the forecastle and, refusing orders to leave, began to argue with the officers. Captain Eyles asked to know their demands, which were an assurance that Temeraire would not go to the West Indies, but instead would return to England. Eventually Rear Admiral Campbell came down to speak to the men, and having informed them that the officers did not know the destination of the ship, he ordered them to disperse. The men went below decks and the incipient mutiny appeared to have been quashed. The ringleaders, numbering around a dozen, remained determined however, and made discreet inquiries among the rest of the crew. Having eventually determined that the majority of the crew would, if not actually support a mutiny, at least not oppose it, and that Temeraire's crew would be supported by the ship's marines as well as the crews of some of the other warships in Bantry Bay, they decided to press ahead with their plans. The mutiny began with the crew closing the ship's gunports, effectively barricading themselves below deck. Having done so, they refused orders to open them again, jeered the officers and threatened violence. The crew then came up on deck and once again demanded to know their destination and refused to obey orders to sail for anywhere but England. Having presented their demands they returned below decks and resumed the usual shipboard routine as much as they could.

Alarmed by the actions of Temeraire's crew, Campbell met with Vice-Admiral Sir Andrew Mitchell the following day and informed him of the mutineers' demands. Mitchell reported the news to the Admiralty while Campbell returned to Temeraire and summoned the crew on deck once more. He urged them to return to duty, and then dismissed them. Meanwhile, discipline had begun to break down among the mutineers. Several of the crew became drunk, and some of the officers were struck by rowdy seamen. When one of the marines who supported the mutiny was placed in irons for drunken behaviour and insolence, a crowd formed on deck and tried to free him. The officers resisted these attempts and as sailors began to push and threaten them, Campbell gave the order for the marines to arrest those he identified as the ringleaders. The marines hesitated, but then obeyed the order, driving the unruly seamen back and arresting a number of them, who were immediately placed in irons. Campbell ordered the remaining crew to abandon any mutinous actions, and deprived of its leaders, the mutiny collapsed, though the officers were on their guard for several days afterwards and the marines were ordered to carry out continuous patrols.

News of the mutiny created a sensation in England, and the Admiralty ordered Temeraire to sail immediately for Spithead while an investigation was carried out. Vice-Admiral Mitchell was granted extraordinary powers regarding the death sentence and Temeraire's complement of marines was hastily augmented for the voyage to England. On the ship's arrival, the 14 imprisoned ringleaders were swiftly court-martialled in Portsmouth aboard HMS Gladiator, some on 6 January 1802 and the rest on 14 January. After deliberations, twelve were sentenced to be hanged at the yardarm, and the remaining two were to receive two hundred lashes each.^{[c]} Four men were duly hanged aboard Temeraire, and the remainder were hanged aboard several of the ships anchored at Portsmouth, including HMS Majestic, HMS Formidable, HMS Achille and HMS Centaur. A further seven men involved were sent to prison hulks for life.

== West Indies and the peace ==
After the executions, Temeraire was immediately sent to sea, sailing from Portsmouth for the Isle of Wight the day after and beginning preparations for her delayed voyage to the West Indies. She sailed for Barbados, arriving there on 24 February, and remained in the West Indies until the summer. During her time there the Treaty of Amiens was finally signed and ratified, and Temeraire was ordered back to Britain. She arrived at Plymouth on 28 September and Eyles paid her off on 5 October. Because of the drawdown in the size of the active navy as a result of the peace, Temeraire was laid up in the Hamoaze for the next eight months.

== Return to service ==
The peace of Amiens was a brief interlude in the wars with Revolutionary France, and in 1803 the War of the Third Coalition began. Temeraire had deteriorated substantially during her long period spent laid up, and she was taken into dry dock on 22 May to repair and refit, starting with the replacement of her copper sheathing. Work was delayed when a heavy storm hit Plymouth in January 1804, causing appreciable damage to Temeraire, but was finally completed by February 1804, at a cost of £16,898.

Command was assigned to Captain Eliab Harvey, and he arrived to take up his commission on 1 January 1804. The crew were largely from Liverpool. They left Cawsand Bay on 11 March 1804, sailing to join the Channel Fleet off Brest, still under the overall command of Admiral Cornwallis.

As a much forgotten part of history, Napoleon had assembled his Grand Army, 160,000 men, near Boulogne as part of a plan to invade England. The bulk of the French navy: 21 ships of the line, were harboured at Brest but were needed for the invasion plan.

Temeraire now resumed her previous duties blockading the French at Brest, patrolling between Ushant Island and Cape Finisterre. Heavy weather took its toll, forcing her to put into Torbay for extensive repairs after her long patrols, repairs which eventually amounted to £9,143. During this time Harvey was often absent from his command, usually attending to his duties as Member of Parliament for Essex. He was temporarily replaced by Captain William Kelly on 27 August 1804, and he in turn was succeeded by Captain George Fawke on 6 April 1805. Harvey returned to his ship on 9 July 1805, and it was while he was in command that the reinforced Rochefort squadron under Vice-Admiral Sir Robert Calder intercepted and attacked a Franco-Spanish fleet at the Battle of Cape Finisterre. The French commander, Pierre-Charles Villeneuve, was thwarted in his attempt to join the French forces at Brest, and instead sailed south to Ferrol, and then to Cádiz. When news of the Franco-Spanish fleet's location reached the Admiralty, they appointed Vice-Admiral Horatio Nelson to take command of the blockading force at Cádiz, which at the time was being commanded by Vice-Admiral Cuthbert Collingwood. Nelson was told to pick whichever ships he liked to serve under him, and one of those he specifically chose was Temeraire.

Collingwood replaced Calder on the Temeraire in August 1804.

The ship sheltered with the Channel Fleet at Douarnenez Bay in France during the storms of November 1804. Further winter storms caused her to go to Torbay for repairs in January 1805 and she did not return to the squadron at Brest until April.

Command returned to Calder again on 16 August 1805 and headed for Ferrol to intercept Admiral Vileneuve and the French fleet. The French unexpectedly turned south and the British fleet followed them down to Cádiz.

== Battle of Trafalgar ==
Temeraire duly received orders to join the Cádiz blockade, and having sailed to rendezvous with Collingwood, Harvey awaited Nelson's arrival. Nelson's flagship, the 100-gun HMS Victory, arrived off Cádiz on 28 September, and he took over command of the fleet from Collingwood. He spent the next few weeks forming his plan of attack in preparation for the expected sortie of the Franco-Spanish fleet, issuing it to his captains on 9 October in the form of a memorandum. The memorandum called for two divisions of ships to attack at right angles to the enemy line, severing its van from the centre and rear. A third advance squadron would be deployed as a reserve, with the ability to join one of the lines as the course of the battle dictated. Nelson placed the largest and most powerful ships at the heads of the lines, with Temeraire assigned to lead Nelson's own column into battle. The fleet patrolled a considerable distance from the Spanish coast to lure the combined fleet out, and the ships took the opportunity to exercise and prepare for the coming battle. For Temeraire this probably involved painting her sides in the Nelson Chequer design, to enable the British ships to tell friend from foe in the confusion of battle.

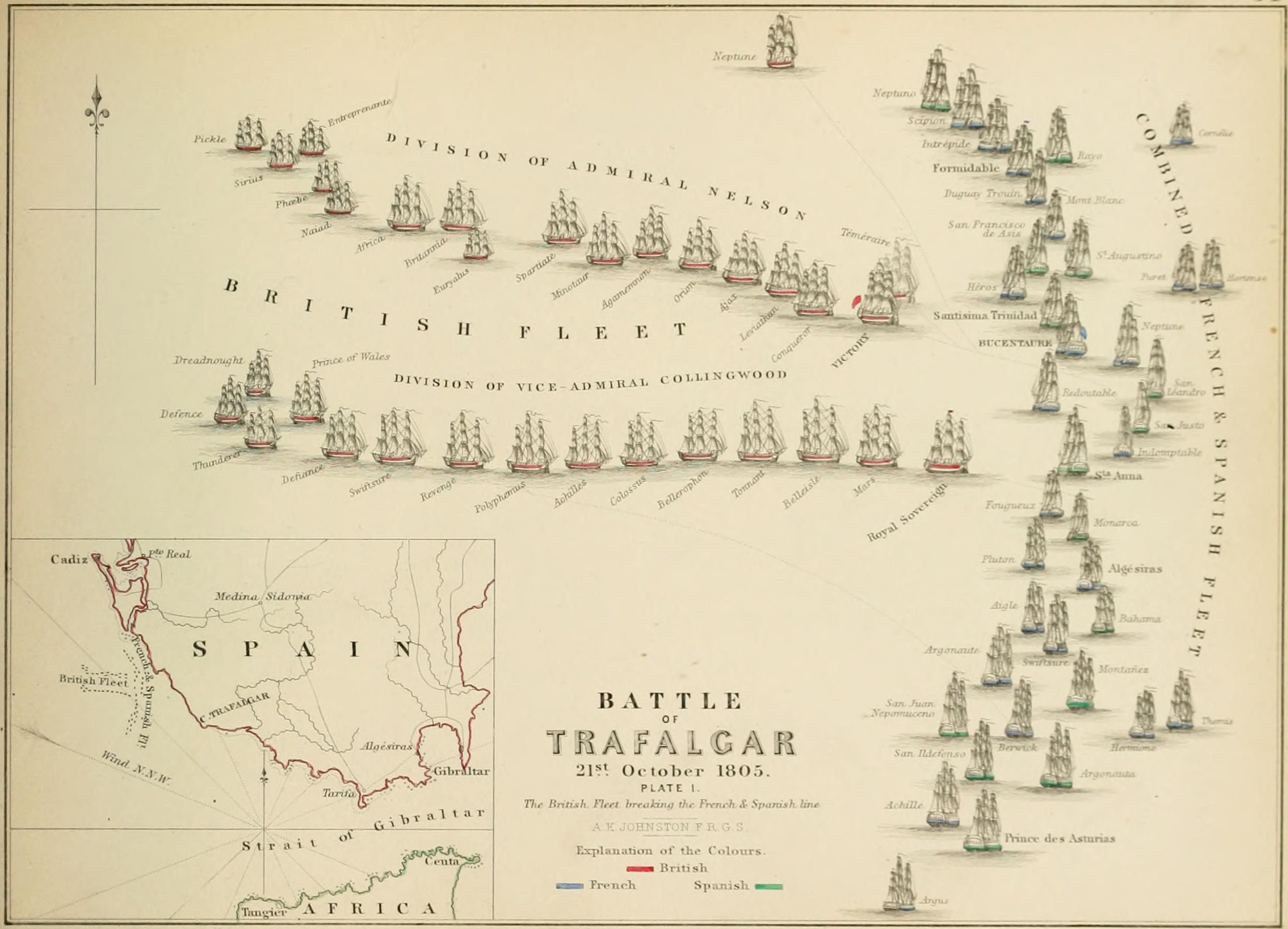
An 1848 plan of the fleet positions at the Battle of Trafalgar. Temeraire forms part of the weather column, and is depicted abreast of the Victory, racing her for the Franco-Spanish line.

The combined Franco-Spanish fleet left Cádiz and put to sea on 19 October 1805, and by 21 October was in sight of the British ships. Nelson formed up his lines and the British began to converge on their distant opponents. Contrary to his original instructions, Nelson took the lead of the weather column in Victory. Concerned for the commander-in-chief's safety in such an exposed position, Henry Blackwood, a long-standing friend of Nelson and commander of the frigate HMS Euryalus that day, suggested Nelson come aboard his ship to better observe and direct the battle. Nelson refused, so Blackwood instead tried to convince him to let Harvey come past him in the Temeraire, and so lead the column into battle. Nelson agreed to this, and signalled for Harvey to come past him. As Temeraire drew up towards Victory, Nelson decided that if he was standing aside to let another ship lead his line, so too should Collingwood, commanding the lee column of ships. He signalled Collingwood, aboard his flagship HMS Royal Sovereign, to let another ship come ahead of him, but Collingwood continued to surge ahead. Reconsidering his plan, Nelson is reported to have hailed Temeraire, as she came up alongside Victory, with the words "I'll thank you, Captain Harvey, to keep in your proper station, which is astern of the Victory." Nelson's instruction was followed up by a formal signal and Harvey dropped back reluctantly, but otherwise kept within one ship's length of Victory as she sailed up to the Franco-Spanish line.

Closely following Victory as she passed through the Franco-Spanish line across the bows of the French flagship Bucentaure, Harvey was forced to sheer away quickly, just missing Victory's stern. Turning to starboard, Harvey made for the 140-gun Spanish ship Santísima Trinidad and engaged her for twenty minutes, taking raking fire from two French ships, the 80-gun Neptune and the 74-gun Redoutable, as she did so. Redoutable's broadside carried away Temeraire's mizzen topmast. While avoiding a broadside from Neptune, Temeraire narrowly avoided a collision with Redoutable. Another broadside from Neptune brought down Temeraire's fore-yard and main topmast, and damaged her fore mast and bowsprit. Harvey now became aware that Redoutable had come up alongside Victory and swept her decks with musket fire and grenades. A large party of Frenchmen now gathered on her decks ready to board Victory. Temeraire was brought around; appearing suddenly out of the smoke of the battle and slipping across Redoutable's stern, Temeraire discharged a double-shotted broadside into her. Jean Jacques Étienne Lucas, captain of Redoutable, recorded that "... the three-decker [Temeraire] – who had doubtless perceived that the Victory had ceased fire and would inevitably be taken – ran foul of the Redoutable to starboard and overwhelmed us with the point-blank fire of all her guns. It would be impossible to describe the horrible carnage produced by the murderous broadside of this ship. More than two hundred of our brave lads were killed or wounded by it."

=== Temeraire and Redoutable ===
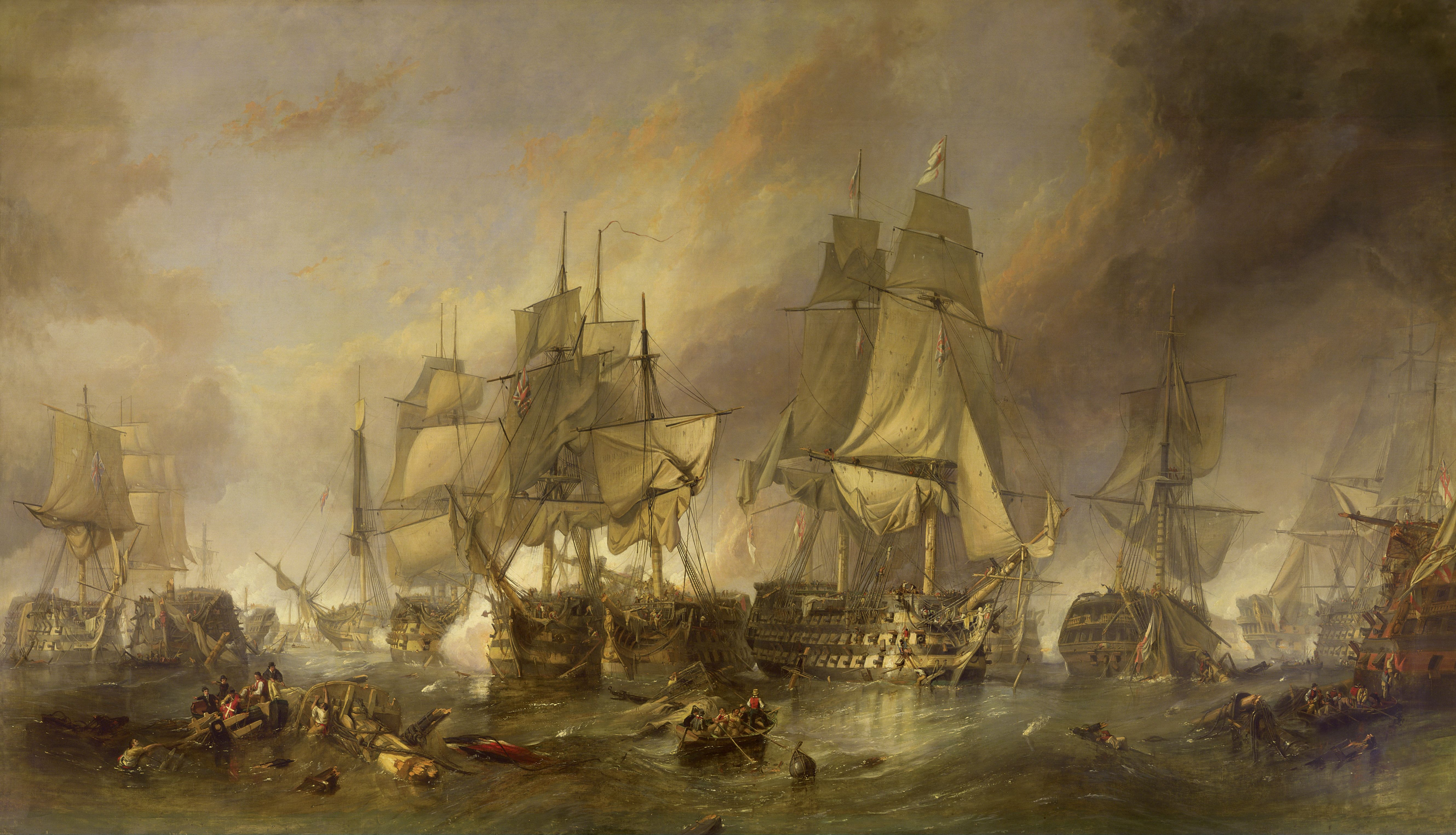
The Battle of Trafalgar, 1836 oil on canvas by Clarkson Frederick Stanfield. Stanfield shows the damaged Redoutable caught between Victory (foreground) and Temeraire (seen bow on). Fougueux, coming up on Temeraire's starboard side, has just received a broadside.

Temeraire then rammed into Redoutable, dismounting many of the French ship's guns, and worked her way alongside, after which her crew lashed the two ships together. Temeraire now poured continuous broadsides into the French ship, taking fire as she did so from the 112-gun Spanish ship Santa Ana lying off her stern, and from the 74-gun French ship Fougueux, which came up on Temeraire's un-engaged starboard side. Harvey ordered his gun crews to hold fire until Fougueux came within point blank range. Temeraire's first broadside against Fougueux at a range of 100 yards (91 m) caused considerable damage to the Frenchman's rigging, and she drifted into Temeraire, whose crew promptly lashed her to the side. Temeraire was now lying between two French 74-gun ships. As Harvey later recalled in a letter to his wife "Perhaps never was a ship so circumstanced as mine, to have for more than three hours two of the enemy's line of battle ships lashed to her." Redoutable, sandwiched between Victory and Temeraire, suffered heavy casualties, reported by Captain Lucas as amounting to 300 dead and 222 wounded. During the fight grenades thrown from the decks and topmasts of Redoutable killed and wounded a number of Temeraire's crew and set her starboard rigging and foresail on fire. There was a brief pause in the fighting while both sides worked to douse the flames. Temeraire narrowly escaped destruction when a grenade thrown from Redoutable exploded on her maindeck, nearly igniting the after-magazine. Master-At-Arms John Toohig prevented the fire from spreading and saved not only Temeraire, but the surrounding ships, which would have been caught in the explosion.

After twenty minutes' fighting both Victory and Temeraire, Redoutable had been reduced to a floating wreck.^{[d]} Temeraire had also suffered heavily, damaged when Redoutable's main mast fell onto her poop deck, and having had her own topmasts shot away.^{[e]} Informed that his ship was in danger of sinking, Lucas finally called for quarter to Temeraire. Harvey sent a party across under the second lieutenant, John Wallace, to take charge of the ship.

=== Temeraire and Fougueux ===
Lashed together, Temeraire and Fougueux exchanged fire, Temeraire initially clearing the French ship's upper deck with small arms fire. The French rallied, but the greater height of the three-decked Temeraire compared to the two-decked Fougueux thwarted their attempts to board. Instead Harvey dispatched his own boarding party, led by First-Lieutenant Thomas Fortescue Kennedy, which entered Fougueux via her main deck ports and chains. The French tried to defend the decks port by port, but were steadily overwhelmed. Fougueux's captain, Louis Alexis Baudoin, had suffered a fatal wound earlier in the fighting, leaving Commander François Bazin in charge. When he learned that nearly all the officers were dead or wounded and that most of the guns were out of action, Bazin surrendered the ship to the boarders.

Temeraire had by now fought both French ships to a standstill, at considerable cost to herself. She had sustained casualties of 47 killed and 76 wounded. All her sails and yards had been destroyed, only her lower masts remained, and the rudder head and starboard cathead had been shot away. Eight feet (2.4 m) of her starboard hull was staved in and both quarter galleries had been destroyed. Harvey signalled for a frigate to tow his damaged ship out of the line, and HMS Sirius came up to assist. Before Sirius could make contact, Temeraire came under fire from a counter-attack by the as-yet unengaged van of the combined fleet, led by Rear Admiral Pierre Dumanoir le Pelley. Harvey ordered the few guns that could be brought to bear fired in response, and the attack was eventually beaten off by fresh British ships arriving on the scene.

== Storm ==
Shortly after the battle had ended, a severe gale struck the area. Several of the captured French and Spanish ships foundered in the rising seas, including both of Temeraire's prizes, Fougueux and Redoutable. Lost in the wrecks were a considerable number of their crews, as well as 47 Temeraire crewmen, serving as prize crews. Temeraire rode out the storm following the battle, sometimes being taken in tow by less damaged ships, sometimes riding at anchor. She took aboard a number of Spanish and French prisoners transferred from other prizes, including some transferred from Euryalus, which was serving as the temporary flagship of Cuthbert Collingwood, who was now in command as Nelson had been killed during the battle. Harvey took the opportunity to go aboard Euryalus and present his account of the battle to Collingwood, and so became the only captain to do so before Collingwood wrote his dispatch about the victory.

=== Return to England ===
Temeraire finally put into Gibraltar on 2 November, eleven days after the battle had been fought. After undergoing minor repairs she sailed for England, arriving at Portsmouth on 1 December, three days before Victory passed by carrying Nelson's body. The battle-damaged ships quickly became tourist attractions, and visitors flocked to tour them. Temeraire was particularly popular on her arrival, being the only ship singled out by name in Collingwood's dispatch for her heroic conduct. Collingwood wrote:

A circumstance occurred during the action which so strongly marks the invincible spirit of British seamen, when engaging the enemies of their country, that I cannot resist the pleasure I have in making it known to their Lordships; the Temeraire was boarded by accident; or design, by a French ship on one side, and a Spaniard on the other; the contest was vigorous, but, in the end the combined ensigns were torn from the poop and the British hoisted in their places.

Collingwood's account, probably based largely on Harvey's report in the immediate aftermath of the battle, contained several errors. Temeraire had closely engaged two French ships, rather than a French and a Spanish ship, and had not been boarded by either during the action. Nevertheless, the account was popular and a print was rushed out purporting to show Harvey taking the lead in clearing Temeraire's decks of enemy seamen.

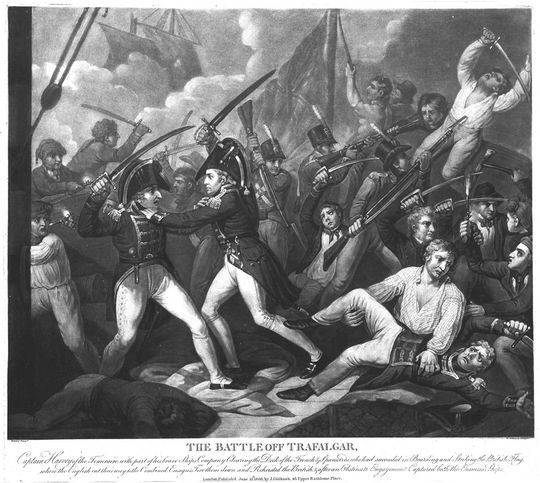
"Captain Harvey of the Temeraire ... clearing the deck of the French and Spaniards ..."

A number of artists visited the newly returned Trafalgar ships, including John Livesay, drawing master at the Royal Naval Academy. Livesay produced several sketches of battle-damaged ships, sending them to Nicholas Pocock to be used for Pocock's large paintings of the battle. Temeraire was one of the ships he sketched. Another visitor to Portsmouth was J. M. W. Turner. It is not known whether he visited Temeraire, though he did go aboard Victory, making preparatory notes and sketches and interviewing sailors who had been in the battle. The story of Temeraire had become firmly ingrained in the public mind, so much so that when the House of Commons passed a vote of thanks to the men who had fought at Trafalgar, only three were specifically named. Nelson, Collingwood, and Harvey of Temeraire.

== Mediterranean and Baltic service ==
The battle-damaged Temeraire was almost immediately dry-docked in Portsmouth to undergo substantial repairs, which eventually lasted sixteen months and cost £25,352. She finally left the dockyard in mid-1807, now under the command of Captain Sir Charles Hamilton. Having fitted her for sea, Hamilton sailed to the Mediterranean in September and joined the fleet blockading the French in Toulon. The service was largely uneventful, and Temeraire returned to Britain in April 1808 to undergo repairs at Plymouth. During her time in Britain the strategic situation in Europe changed as Spain rebelled against French domination and entered the war against France. Temeraire sailed in June to join naval forces operating off the Spanish coast in support of anti-French forces in the Peninsular War.

This service continued until early 1809, when she returned to Britain. By now Britain was heavily involved in the Baltic, protecting mercantile interests. An expedition under Sir James Gambier in July 1807 had captured most of the Danish Navy at the Second Battle of Copenhagen, in response to fears that it might fall into Napoleon's hands, at the cost of starting a war with Denmark. Captain Hamilton left the ship, and was superseded by Captain Edward Sneyd Clay. Temeraire now became the flagship of Rear Admiral Sir Manley Dixon, with orders to go to the Baltic to reinforce the fleet stationed there under Sir James Saumarez. Temeraire arrived in May 1809 and was sent to blockade Karlskrona on the Swedish coast.

While on patrol with the 64-gun HMS Ardent and the frigate HMS Melpomene, Temeraire became involved in one of the heaviest Danish gunboat attacks of the war. A party of men from Ardent had been landed on the island of Romsø, but were taken by surprise in a Danish night attack, which saw most of the Ardent men captured. The Melpomene was sent under a flag of truce to negotiate for their release, but on returning from this mission, was becalmed. A flotilla of thirty Danish gunboats then launched an attack, taking advantage of the stranded Melpomene's inability to bring her broadside to bear on them. Melpomene signalled for help to the Temeraire, which immediately dispatched boats to her assistance. They engaged and then drove off the Danish ships, and then helped the Melpomene to safety. She had been heavily damaged and suffered casualties of five killed and twenty-nine wounded. Temeraire's later Baltic service involved being dispatched to observe the Russian fleet at Reval, during which time she made a survey of the island of Nargen. After substantial blockading and convoy escort work, Temeraire was ordered back to Britain as winter arrived, and she arrived in Plymouth in November 1809.

== Iberian service ==
After a period under repair in Plymouth, Temeraire was recommissioned under the command of Captain Edwin H. Chamberlayne in late January 1810. The Peninsular War had reached a critical stage, with the Spanish government besieged in Cádiz by the French. Temeraire, now the flagship of Rear Admiral Francis Pickmore, was ordered to reinforce the city's water defences, and provided men from her sailor and marine complement to crew batteries and gunboats. Men from Temeraire were heavily involved in the fighting until July 1810, when Pickmore was ordered to sail to the Mediterranean and take up a new position as port admiral at Mahón. Temeraire was thereafter based either at Mahón or off Toulon with the blockading British fleet under Admiral Sir Edward Pellew. Chamberlayne was replaced by Captain Joseph Spear in March 1811, and for the most part the blockade was uneventful. Though possessing a powerful fleet, the French commander avoided any contact with the blockading force and stayed in port, or else made very short voyages, returning to the harbour when the British appeared.

Temeraire's one brush with the French during this period came on 13 August 1811. Having received orders to sail to Menorca, Spear attempted to tack out of Hyères Bay. As he tried to do so, the wind fell away, leaving Temeraire becalmed and caught in a current which caused her to drift towards land. She came under fire from a shore battery on Pointe des Medes, which wounded several of her crew. Her boats were quickly manned, and together with boats sent from the squadron, Temeraire was towed out of range of the French guns. She then sailed to Menorca and underwent repairs. During this period an epidemic of yellow fever broke out, infecting nearly the entire crew and killing around a hundred crewmen. Pellew ordered her back to Britain, and health gradually improved as she sailed through the Atlantic.

== Retirement ==
Temeraire arrived in Plymouth on 9 February 1812 and was docked for a survey several weeks later. The survey reported that she was "a well built and strong ship but apparently much decay'd." Spear was superseded on 4 March by Captain Samuel Hood Linzee, but Linzee's command was short-lived. Temeraire left the dock on 13 March and was paid off one week later. Advances in naval technology had developed more powerful and strongly built warships, and though still comparatively new, Temeraire was no longer considered desirable for front-line service. While laid up the decision was taken to convert her into a prison ship to alleviate overcrowding caused by large influxes of French prisoners from the Peninsular War campaigns. Conversion work was carried out at Plymouth between November and December 1813, after which she was laid up in the River Tamar as a prison hulk. From 1814 she was under the nominal command of Lieutenant John Wharton. Despite being laid up and disarmed Temeraire and the rest of her class were nominally re-rated as 104-gun first rates in February 1817.

Temeraire's service as a prison ship lasted until 1819, at which point she was selected for conversion to a receiving ship. She was extensively refitted at Plymouth between September 1819 and June 1820 at a cost of £27,733, and then sailed to Sheerness Dockyard. As a receiving ship she served as a temporary berth for new naval recruits until they received a posting to a ship. She fulfilled this role for eight years, until becoming a victualling depot in 1829. Her final role was as a guard ship at Sheerness, under the title "Guardship of the Ordinary and Captain-Superintendent's ship of the Fleet Reserve in the Medway". This final post as flagship of the Medway Reserve involved her being repainted and rearmed, and she was used to train boys belonging to The Marine Society. For the last two years of her service, from 1836 to 1838 she was under the nominal command of Captain Thomas Fortescue Kennedy, in his post as Captain-Superintendent of Sheerness. Kennedy had been Temeraire's first-lieutenant at Trafalgar.

== Sale and disposal ==
Kennedy received orders from the Admiralty in June 1838 to have Temeraire valued in preparation for her sale out of the service. She fired her guns for the last time on 28 June in celebration of the Coronation of Queen Victoria, and work began on dismantling her on 4 July. Kennedy delegated this task to Captain Sir John Hill, commander of HMS Ocean. Her masts, stores and guns were all removed and her crew paid off, before Temeraire was put up for sale with twelve other ships. She was sold by Dutch auction on 16 August 1838 to John Beatson, a shipbreaker based at Rotherhithe for £5,530. Beatson was then faced with the task of transporting the ship 55 miles from Sheerness to Rotherhithe, the largest ship to have attempted this voyage. To accomplish this he hired two steam tugs from the Thames Steam Towing Company and employed a Rotherhithe pilot named William Scott and twenty five men to sail her up the Thames, at a cost of £58.^{[f]}

== Last voyage ==
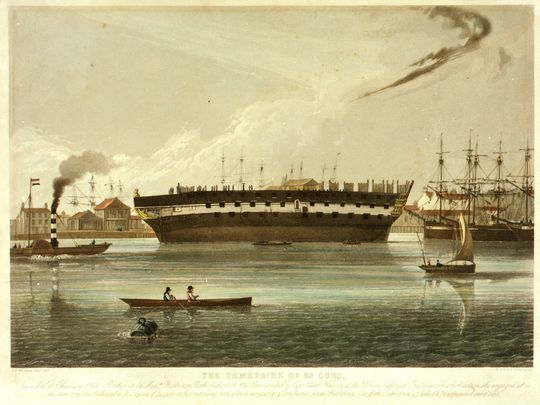
HMS Temeraire laid up at Beatson's Yard, Rotherhithe, on the River Thames, by artist J. J. Williams, 1838–39

The tugs took the hulk of Temeraire in tow at 7:30 am on 5 September 1838, taking advantage of the beginning of the slack water. They had reached Greenhithe by 1:30 pm at the ebb of the tide, where they anchored overnight. They resumed the journey at 8:30 am the following day, passing Woolwich and then Greenwich at noon. They reached Limehouse Reach shortly afterward, and brought her safely to Beatson's Wharf at Rotherhithe at 2 pm. This was a breakers' yard owned by the Beatson family.

Temeraire was hauled up onto the mud, where she lay as she was slowly broken up. The final voyage was announced in a number of newspapers, and thousands of spectators came to see her towed up the Thames or laid up at Beatson's yard. The shipbreakers undertook a thorough dismantling, removing all the copper sheathing, rudder pintles and gudgeons, copper bolts, nails and other fastenings to be sold back to the Admiralty. The timber was mostly sold to house builders and shipyard owners, though some was retained for working into specialist commemorative furniture.

== Legacy ==
The immediate legacy of Temeraire was the use of the timber taken from her as she was broken up. A gong stand made from Temeraire timber was a wedding present to the future King George V on the occasion of his marriage to Mary of Teck, and is held at Balmoral Castle. A barometer, gavel, and some miscellaneous timber are in the collections of the National Maritime Museum, and chairs made from Temeraire oak are in the possession of the Royal Naval Museum, Portsmouth, Lloyd's Register, London and the Whanganui Regional Museum, Whanganui. An altar, communion rail and two bishop's chairs survive in St. Mary's Church, Rotherhithe. A ship model of Temeraire made by prisoners of war uses a stand made from wood taken from her, and is currently in the Watermen's Hall in London. Other relics of Temeraire known to exist or have existed are a tea caddy made for her signal midshipman at Trafalgar, James Eaton, and sold at auction in 2000, the frame for an oil painting by Sir Edwin Landseer titled Neptune, and a mantelpiece made for Beatson's office, supported by figures of Atlas supposedly taken from Temeraire's stern gallery. The mantelpiece can no longer be traced, nor can a plaque once fixed to Temeraire's deck commemorating Nelson's signal at Trafalgar, nor a wooden leg made for a Trafalgar veteran from Temeraire's wood. John Ruskin foreshadowed the fate of Temeraire's wood in an essay which claimed that "Perhaps, where the low gate opens to some cottage garden, the tired traveller may ask, idly, why the moss grows so green on its rugged wood, and even the sailor's child may not answer nor know that the night dew lies deep in the war rents of the wood of the old Temeraire."

=== Art ===
Temeraire features in a number of paintings and prints, the earliest commemorating her role in the battle of Trafalgar. She can be seen at least partially in paintings of the battle by Clarkson Frederick Stanfield, John Christian Schetky, Nicholas Pocock, Thomas Buttersworth and Thomas Whitcombe. A fictionalized depiction of her launch was produced by Philip Burgoyne. Later representations of the retired Temeraire were also popular. Though no known contemporary image of her in the prison ship role exists, she was painted while a guardship on the Medway in 1833 by Edward William Cooke, and by William Beatson and J. J. Williams while laid up at Rotherhithe in 1838. More recently she has been the subject of paintings by Geoff Hunt. The most famous painting of Temeraire was made by J. M. W. Turner and titled The Fighting Temeraire tugged to her last Berth to be broken up, 1838. Turner depicts Temeraire on her last voyage, towed up the Thames by a small black steam tug as the sun sets (or dawns). In choosing his title Turner created an enduring appellation, as previously she had been known to her crew as the "saucy" Temeraire. Turner presented it for exhibition at the Royal Academy in 1839 with an accompanying excerpt, slightly altered, of Thomas Campbell's poem Ye Mariners of England.

The flag which braved the battle and the breeze,
no longer owns her.

Turner's painting achieved widespread critical acclaim, and accolades from the likes of John Ruskin and William Makepeace Thackeray. It was Turner's particular favourite; he lent it only once and refused to ever do so again. He also refused to sell it at any price, and on his death bequeathed it to the nation. It hangs today in the National Gallery, and in 2005 it was voted the nation's favourite painting in a poll organized by BBC Radio 4's Today programme.

=== Books ===
The Fighting Temeraire is a historical narrative written by Sam Willis and details the "extraordinary story of the mighty Temeraire, the ship behind J. M. W. Turner's iconic painting". It includes a detailed history of the ship, history of both the Seven Years' War (1756–1763) and the Napoleonic Wars (1798–1815), and 50 full-color illustrations and 60 black-and-white photographs.

The Temeraire series is a historical fantasy/alternate history written by Naomi Novik. While HMS Temeraire herself is only briefly featured, the ship becomes the namesake of the series' main character, a large black dragon who sees naval and aerial action alongside his British captain. The series takes place in an alternate version of the Napoleonic Wars, in which the various nations of the world fight with air forces made up of manned dragons. HMS Temeraire appears briefly in the ninth and final book, firing her guns as a salute while the dragon Temeraire and his captain fly off with their dragon legion toward the last battles with Napoleon.

=== Poetry and songs ===
Temeraire became the subject of a number of poems and songs commemorating her life and fate. An early work by James Duff written between 1813 and 1819 referenced her role as a prison ship, and was set to music in 1857 under the title The Brave Old Temeraire. More generally, an anonymous poem entitled The Wooden Walls of Old England appeared in Fraser's Magazine shortly after Temeraire's arrival at Rotherhithe, and lamented the fate of the great sailing warships. Turner's painting created an enduring interest in the story of Temeraire and several poems appeared in the decades following her breaking-up. Gerald Massey wrote The Fighting Temeraire Tugged to Her Last Berth, Herman Melville produced The Temeraire, and Henry Newbolt wrote The Fighting Temeraire, with its closing lines

Now the sunset's breezes shiver,
And she's fading down the river,
But in England's song forever,
She's the Fighting Temeraire.

== Notes ==
a. Sometimes referred to as the Dreadnought class.

b. This Temeraire retained her French name after her capture, and served during the Seven Years' War, before being sold out of the service in 1784.

c. A number of general histories, including Goodwin's The Ships of Trafalgar and Noel Mostert's The Line on the Wind, say all 14 were hanged. Willis studied contemporary records and reports of the court-martial for his The Fighting Temeraire, and says only 12 of the 14 were sentenced to be hanged. Roy and Lesley Adkins offer a third account: twenty mutineers were tried, all were found guilty and eighteen were sentenced to death, and the other two were to receive one hundred and twenty lashes each. They note that at least six were hanged and possibly as many as twelve, the remainder may have had their sentences commuted to transportation.

d. Lucas described the scene on Redoutable:

In less than half an hour our ship had been so fearfully mauled that she looked like little more than a heap of debris. Judging by appearances, no doubt, the Temeraire, now hailed us to surrender and not prolong a useless resistance. My reply was instantly to order some soldiers who were near me to fire back; which they did with great alacrity. At the same moment almost, the main mast of the Redoutable fell on board the English ship. The two topmasts of the Temeraire then came down, falling on board of us. Our whole poop was stove in, helm rudder and stern post all shattered to splinters, all the stern frame, and the decks shot through. All our own guns were either smashed or dismounted by the broadsides of the Victory and the Temeraire ... The hull itself was riddled, shot through from side to side; deck beams were shattered, port lids torn away or knocked to pieces. Four of our six pumps were so damaged as to be useless. The quarter-deck ladders were broken, which rendered communication with the rest of the ship very difficult. Everywhere the decks were strewn with dead men, lying beneath the debris. Out of a crew of 634 men we had 522 hors de combat; of whom 300 were killed and 222 wounded nearly all the officers among them ... The batteries and upper decks were practically abandoned – bare of men and were unable longer to offer any resistance. No one who had not seen the state of Redoutable could ever form an idea of her awful condition. Really I know of nothing on board that had not been hit by shot.

e. The fall of the mainmast onto Temeraire also caused three French obusiers to fall onto her decks. Harvey promptly claimed them as souvenirs, "with which ... to commemorate the event every year in May by firing them off from the mound at Chigwell".

f. The identity of these tugs has been difficult to determine. Winfield names only one tug, Monarch. Goodwin names them as London and Samson, while Willis states they were Sampson and Newcastle.
