= Neptune-class ship of the line =

1797 class of British second-rate ships of the line

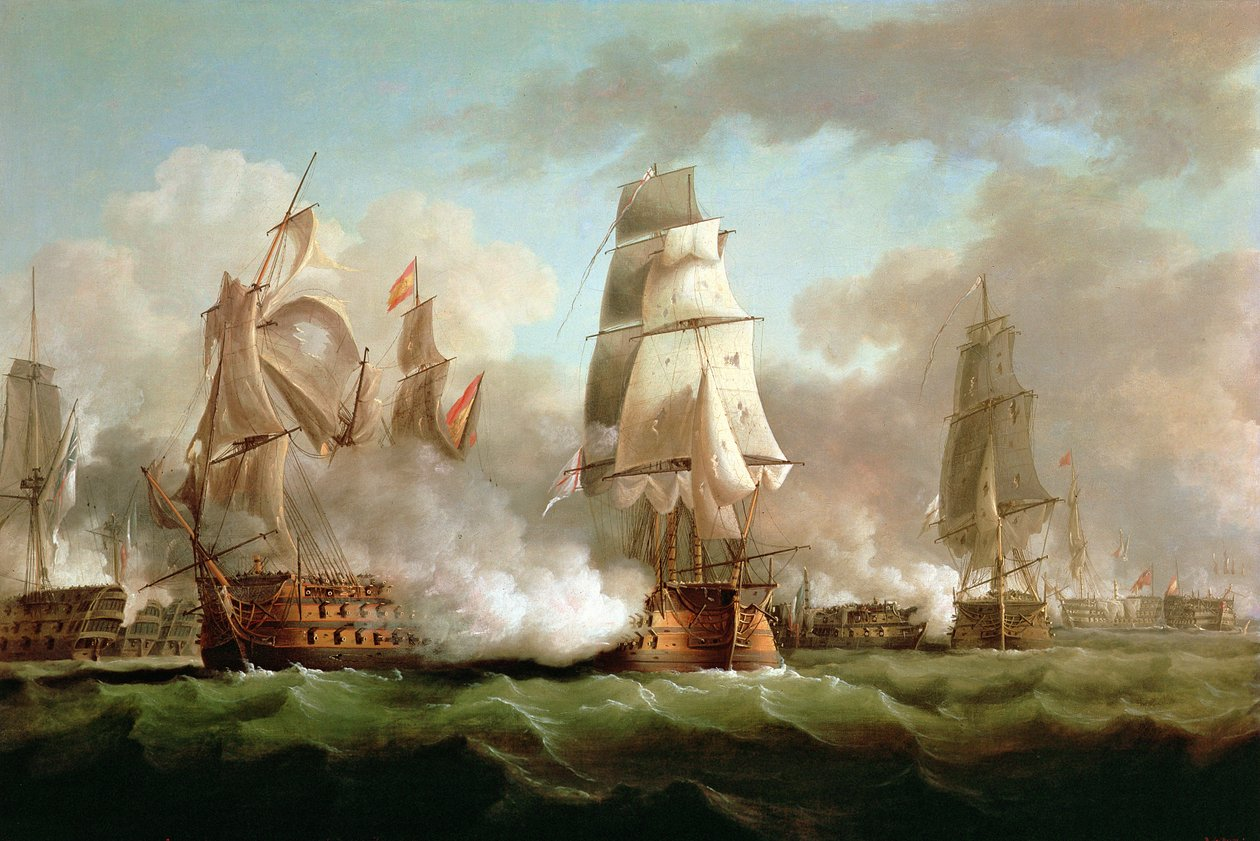
- HMS Neptune (centre) at the Battle of Trafalgar

Class overview
- Name: Neptune class
- Operators: Royal Navy
- Preceded by: Boyne class
- Succeeded by: Boyne class
- In service: 28 January 1797–1857
- Planned: 4
- Completed: 3
- Scrapped: 3

General characteristics (as built)
- Type: 98-gun ship of the line
- Tons burthen: 2,110 53/94 (bm)
- Length: 185 ft (56 m) (gun deck); 152 ft 7 in (46.5 m) (keel)
- Beam: 51 ft (16 m)
- Depth of hold: 21 ft (6.4 m)
- Sail plan: Full-rigged ship
- Crew: 738
- Armament: 98 muzzle-loading, smoothbore guns: Lower gun deck: 28 × 32 pdrs; Middle gun deck: 30 × 18 pdrs; Upper gun deck: 30 × 12 pdrs; Quarterdeck: 8 × 12 pdrs; Forecastle: 2 × 12 pdrs

The Neptune class (Note: Also known as the Dreadnought class.) consisted of three 98-gun, second rate ships of the line built for the Royal Navy (RN) during the 1790s. The ships often served as admirals' flagships during their careers. Completed during the French Revolutionary Wars in 1797, Neptune was the first of the class to enter service when she played a small role in suppressing the Nore mutiny that same year. Together with her sister ships Temeraire and Dreadnought, Neptune spent the time from her completion to 1805 assigned to the Channel Fleet on blockade duty, aside from a brief interregnum during the Peace of Amiens of 1802–1803.

All three of the ships took part in the Battle of Trafalgar in 1805. Temeraire was badly damaged during the battle, but captured two French ships of the line. Neptune only captured one ship, but she was the largest and most powerful warship in the world, the 136-gun Santísima Trinidad. Dreadnought took the least damage of the sisters and captured a Spanish ship of the line during the battle. She remained on station off the Spanish coast after the battle, while her sisters returned to England for repairs. Dreadnought followed home the following year.

The sisters spent much of 1806 and part of 1807 refitting. Dreadnought was the first one to return to service when she rejoined the Channel Fleet and spent the next few years on blockade duty. The ship was transferred to the Baltic Fleet in 1811 before returning home for a lengthy refit that lasted until 1814 after which she was placed in ordinary (reserve). Temeraire was next and was assigned to the Mediterranean Fleet and remained there until the ship was transferred to the Baltic Fleet in 1809. She returned to the Mediterranean Fleet the following year. Temeraire was sent back to England in 1811 and was placed in ordinary upon her arrival. Neptune's refit was not completed until late 1807 and she was assigned to the Channel Fleet. She was transferred to the Leeward Islands in 1808 where she participated in the invasion of Martinique early the following year and the subsequent operations. The ship returned home in 1810 and was placed in ordinary upon her arrival.

Neptune and Temeraire were converted into prison hulks in 1812–1813. The former ship was broken up for scrap in 1818. Temeraire was converted into a receiving ship in 1820 and was sold for scrap in 1838. Dreadnought was converted into a lazaretto in 1825 and then into a hospital ship in 1831. The ship was broken up in 1857.

== Design and description ==
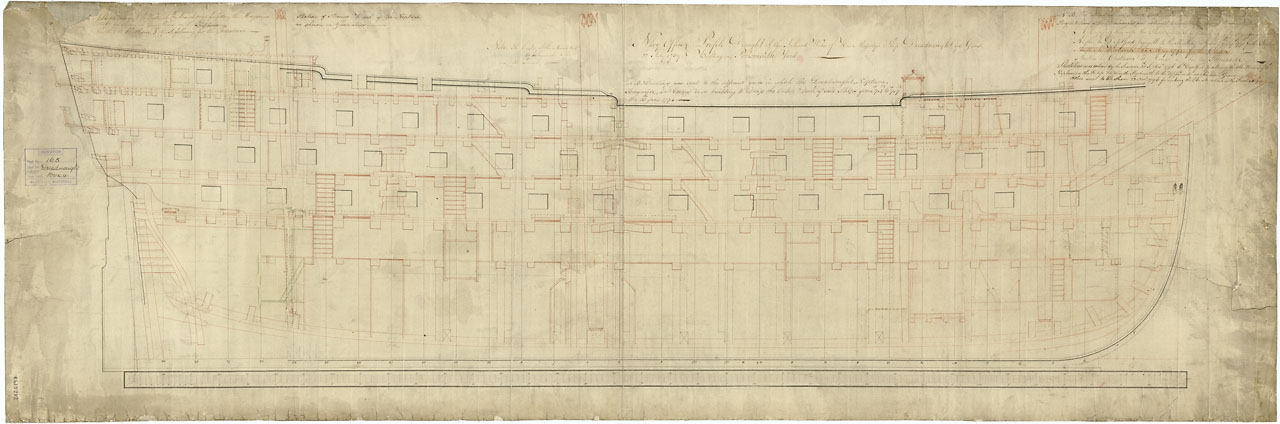
Admiralty plan for a 98-gun ship of the line of the Neptune class. This represents the design for HMS Dreadnought, drawn up by the Navy Office and dated 22 July 1789.

Designed by Sir John Henslow, the Surveyor of the Navy, the ships measured 185 feet (56.4 m) at the gun deck and 152 feet 7 inches (46.5 m) at the keel. They had a beam of 51 feet (15.5 m), a depth of hold of 21 feet (6.4 m) and a tonnage of 2,110 53/94 tons burthen. The Neptune-class ships had three masts and were ship-rigged.

The ships were armed with 98 muzzle-loading, smoothbore guns that consisted of twenty-eight 32-pounder guns on their lower gun deck, thirty 18-pounder guns on their middle gun deck and thirty 12-pounder guns on their upper gun deck. (Note: Lavery says that the upper deck armament consisted of 18-pounder guns and Goodwin states that both Neptune and Dreadnought had their upper deck 18-pounders replaced by 12-pounders during their post-Trafalgar refits.) Their forecastles mounted a pair of 12-pounders and the quarterdeck had eight 12-pounders.

== Ships ==
Construction data
Ship	Builder	Ordered	Laid down	Launched	Completed	Fate
HMS Neptune	HM Dockyard, Deptford	15 February 1790	April 1791	28 January 1797	12 February 1797	Broken up, October 1818
HMS Temeraire	HM Dockyard, Chatham	9 December 1790	July 1793	11 September 1798	18 May 1799	Sold for scrap, 16 August 1838
HMS Dreadnought	HM Dockyard, Portsmouth	17 January 1788	July 1788	13 June 1801	9 August 1801	Broken up, 1857

== Service history ==
Neptune was commissioned in March 1797 and was assigned to the Channel Fleet. She became the flagship of Commodore Sir Erasmus Gower who deterred the Nore mutineers from marching on London. After the mutiny, Gower lowered his broad pennant in September and assumed command of Neptune. The ship remained on blockade duty in the English Channel until she was transferred to the Mediterranean Fleet in June 1797. She served as the flagship of Vice-Admiral James Gambier in 1801–1802 and returned home with the signing of the Peace of Amiens in early 1802. There she was refitted and then rejoined the Channel Fleet. The fleet resumed blockading French ports when the British declared war on France in May 1803 and Neptune remained with the fleet until she was ordered to join Vice-Admiral Robert Calder's fleet blockading Ferrol, Spain, in August 1805.

Temeraire was commissioned in March 1799 and was assigned to the Channel Fleet as the flagship of Rear-Admiral John Warren in July. A few months later, she became the flagship of Rear-Admiral James Whitshed. Rear-Admiral Rear-Admiral George Campbell hoisted his flag in Temeraire in late 1801. Elements of the ship's crew mutinied when she was ordered to Bantry Bay, Ireland, in December to wait for a convoy that she would escort to the West Indies while the Peace of Amiens was being negotiated. After the mutiny was suppressed and the ringleaders hung in January 1802, Temeraire was sent to the West Indies where she remained for the next six months. She was refitted from May 1803 to February and then rejoined the Channel Fleet. The ship was ordered to join Vice-Admiral Cuthbert Collingwood's newly formed squadron blockading the Spanish and French fleets in Cádiz, Spain, in July.

Dreadnought was commissioned in June 1801 and was fitting out until August. She was assigned to the Channel Fleet and remained on blockade duty until the Peace of Amiens was signed in March 1802, although the ship was not paid off until July. Dreadnought was recommissioned in March 1803 in anticipation of the British declaration of war on 18 May, Admiral William Cornwallis hoisting his flag aboard as commander of the Channel Fleet the same day. He decided to transfer his flag to the larger 112-gun Ville de Paris in July. The following month the ship became Collingwood's flagship. He was ordered to form a detached squadron to blockade Cádiz and arrived there on 17 July with only Dreadnought and two 74-gun third rates on hand. The combined Franco-Spanish fleet returning from Vice Admiral Pierre-Charles Villeneuve's expedition to the West Indies was more than strong enough brush aside Collingwood's ships and take refuge in Cádiz on 20 August. When Vice-Admiral Horatio Nelson's fleet arrived off Cádiz on 29 September, he ordered Collingwood to transfer his flag to the larger 100-gun first rate Royal Sovereign.

=== Battle of Trafalgar ===
Artist's conception of the situation at noon as Royal Sovereign was breaking into the Franco-Spanish line. The depiction of Nelson's northern column is incorrect as he aimed much closer to the leading ships, before turning south and paralleling the Franco-Spanish line before turning east towards the French flagship, the 86-gun Bucentaure.

Rather than follow the standard tactic of fighting in parallel battlelines, Nelson decided to split his forces in half and attempt to break through the combined fleet which would allow him to mass his ships against the centre and rear of the Franco-Spanish line. Neptune was assigned to the windward (northern) column during the battle, following behind Nelson's flagship Victory and her sister Temeraire. She followed Victory into the gap between Villeneuve's flagship Bucentaure and the French 74-gun, third rate Redoutable and raked Bucentare's stern with a double-shotted broadside from her port guns at about 1300. Neptune then turned north and sailed along the French ship's starboard side continuing to fire into the flagship. Once Captain Thomas Freemantle felt that Bucentare was beaten, he ordered Neptune to move to the stern of the 136-gun, first rate Santísima Trinidad, the largest and most powerful warship in the world, a position from where he could continue to rake the Spanish flagship. She surrendered to Freemantle at about 1500 after having been completely dismasted. Afterwards, Neptune turned north to prevent the ships of the vanguard from recapturing some of the surrendered ships.

Temeraire was assigned to the windward column, immediately behind Victory. Instead of following the flagship through the same gap, she briefly turned south and passed through the gap between the French 74-gun Redoutable and the 80-gun Neptune, raking the former ship as she passed by. In turn, she received fire from both as well as the Spanish 112-gun Santa Ana, 74-gun San Justo and 64-gun San Leandro that badly damaged her rigging and upper masts, sending her out of control. Temeraire collided with Redoubtable, just as that ship's crew was mustering on her upper deck in preparation to board Victory, which was on Redoubtable's other side. Captain Eliab Harvey had ordered his guns loaded with grapeshot and canister and the broadside killed more than two hundred men, by Redoubtable's commander, Captain Jean Jacques Étienne Lucas's estimate. Shortly afterwards, the badly damaged French 74 Fougueux drifted into Temeraire. Harvey's crew was able to board Fougueux and force her surrender at 1355. After Victory's crew had managed to disentangle her from Redoutable, Lucas refused Harvey's request for him to surrender and the two ships continued to fight on. The French ship's mainmast fell onto Temeraire and that ship's remaining pair of topmasts fell onto Redoutable, but Lucas was ultimately forced to surrender.

Dreadnought was positioned in the rear of the leeward (southern) column and did not reach the ships of the Combined Fleet for several hours after Royal Sovereign had opened fire. Together with the 80-gun Tonnant, she first attacked the Spanish 74-gun San Juan Nepomuceno forcing that ship to surrender, and then attempted to engage the Spanish 112-gun Principe de Asturias without success.

=== Subsequent activities ===
After the battle Temeraire was in the worst shape of the sisters, having been dismasted and needing a tow. In contrast Dreadnought and Neptune were tasked to tow other ships, including Victory and Royal Sovereign. Temeraire was taken to Gibraltar for temporary repairs and was paid off after she reached Portsmouth on 19 December. The ship was not docked for permanent repairs until 18 June 1806. Temeraire was re-coppered and refitted until she was recommissioned on 1 April 1807 and assigned to the Mediterranean Fleet. She returned home for a brief refit in April 1808. The ship was then assigned to the squadron operating off the Atlantic coast of Iberia in support of anti-French forces in the peninsula as Spain had switched sides and the Peninsular War had begun. Temeraire was assigned to the Baltic Fleet in May 1809 as the flagship of Rear-Admiral Sir Manley Dixon. The ship was transferred back to the Mediterranean in February 1810 and became the flagship of Rear-Admiral Francis Pickmore in March 1811 blockading Toulon. She was sent home around the end of 1811 due to an outbreak of fever and reached Plymouth in February 1812. There she was placed in ordinary and surveyed as "much decay'd". Temeraire was converted into a prison hulk in November-December 1813 and served in the River Tamar for the next six years. The ship was refitted as a receiving ship in 1819–1820 and sailed to take up her duties at Sheerness in June 1820. She was ordered to be prepared for sale in June 1838 and was stripped of her masts, rigging, guns other equipment over the next two months. Temeraire was auctioned off on 16 August and was towed to Rotherhithe by two steam-powered paddle tugs to be demolished the following month. Her final voyage was immortalized by J.M.W. Turner in his painting, The Fighting Temeraire.

Neptune need only a few repairs at Gibraltar and arrived at Portsmouth on 6 December 1805 where she was paid off. The ship began a refit in November 1806 that was completed a year later. After the refit, the 18-pounders on her upper gun deck were replaced by 12-pounders. Neptune rejoined the Channel Fleet in late 1807 and was transferred to the Leeward Islands Station in August 1808 where she became the flagship of Rear-Admiral Alexander Cochrane. She supported the Invasion of Martinique in January-February 1809 and fought Troude's expeditionary force when it tried to escape the blockading British ships in April. Neptune returned home in October 1810 and was subsequently placed in ordinary. Like her sister, she was converted into a prison hulk in November-December 1813. The ship was broken up in October 1818.

The repairs that Dreadnought needed after the battle were done by her crew and she remained on station until she returned home in June 1806 to be refitted. Like Neptune, her 18-pounders were replaced by 12-pounders after her refit. The ship was assigned to the Channel Fleet in early 1807 and became the flagship of Rear-Admiral Thomas Sotheby in 1808 and continued in that duty into 1810. She was transferred to the Baltic Fleet in 1811 before being paid off in December. Dreadnought received a "Large Repair" at Portsmouth from August 1812 to March 1814 and was then placed in ordinary. The ship was converted into a lazaretto for service at Pembroke in September 1825 and then to a hospital ship in March to May 1831. She served as the seamen's hospital at Greenwich from June until she was broken up at Woolwich Dockyard in February 1857.
