= Boyne-class ship of the line =

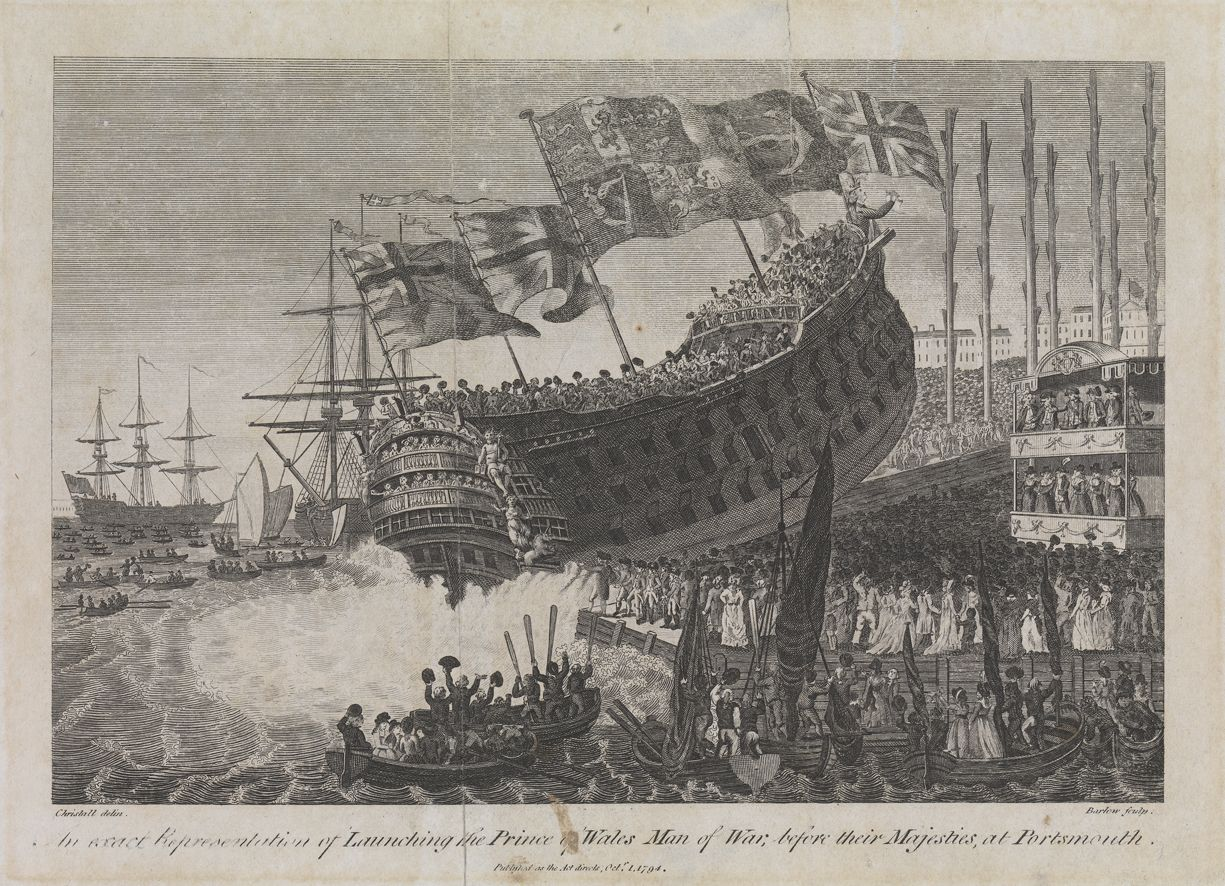
- HMS Prince of Wales

Class overview
- Name: Boyne
- Operators: Royal Navy
- Preceded by: Duke class
- Succeeded by: Neptune class
- In service: August 1790 - July 1814
- Completed: 2

General characteristics
- Type: Ship of the line
- Tons burthen: 2010
- Length: 182 ft (55 m) (gundeck); 149 ft 8 in (45.62 m) (keel)
- Beam: 50 ft 3 in (15.32 m)
- Depth of hold: 21 ft 9 in (6.63 m)
- Propulsion: Sails
- Complement: 750
- Armament: 98 guns: Gundeck: 28 × 32-pounders; Middle gundeck: 30 × 18-pounders; Upper gundeck: 30 × 12-pounders; Quarterdeck: 8 × 12-pounders; Forecastle: 2 × 12-pounders
- Notes: Ships in class include: Boyne, Prince of Wales

The Boyne-class ships of the line were a class of two 98-gun second rates, ordered in 1783 and designed for the Royal Navy by Sir Edward Hunt.

== Ships ==
- HMS Boyne

Builder: Woolwich Dockyard
Ordered: 21 January 1783
Laid down: 4 November 1783
Launched: 27 June 1790
Completed: 21 November 1790
Fate: Burnt, 1 May 1795

- HMS Prince of Wales

Builder: Portsmouth Dockyard
Ordered: 29 November 1783
Laid down: May 1784
Launched: 28 June 1794
Completed: 27 December 1794
Fate: Broken up, December 1822
