= Self-Portrait (Turner) =

Self-Portrait by J. M. W. Turner in Tate Britain

Self Portrait
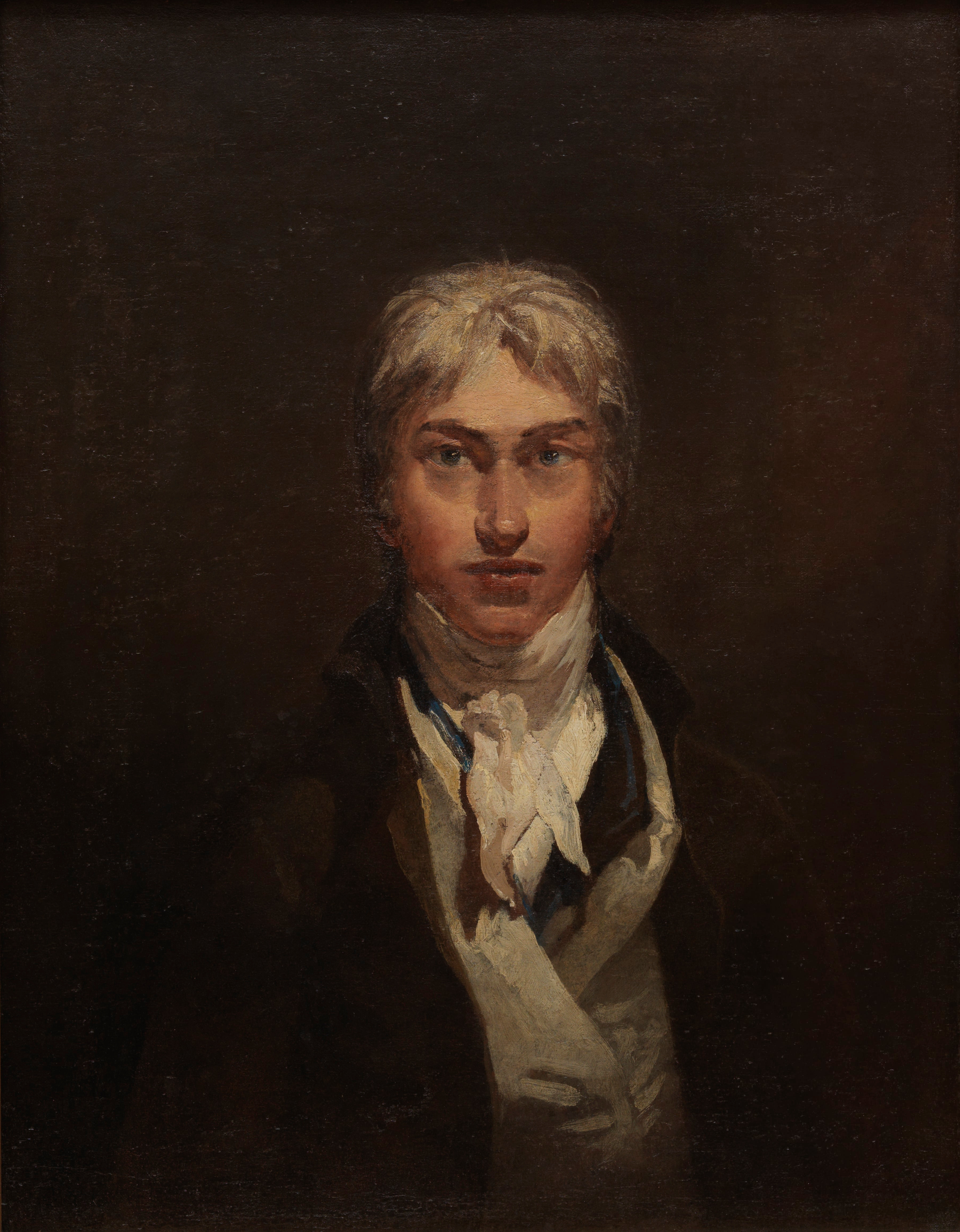
- Artist: J. M. W. Turner
- Year: c. 1798–1799
- Medium: Oil on canvas
- Dimensions: 74.3 cm × 58.4 cm (29.3 in × 23.0 in)
- Location: Tate Britain, London

Tate Britain holds a self-portrait of J. M. W. Turner which it dates to c. 1798 or c. 1799, when the artist was aged about 23 or 24 years old.

The oil painting on canvas portrait measures 74.3 cm × 58.4 cm (29.3 in × 23.0 in). It presents a full face-on half-length view of the fresh-faced young artist, looking directly out at the viewer. His brightly lit features stand out against a featureless brown background. The Romanticised and idealised view of Turner shows him as a prosperous Georgian gentleman, befitting his success and status, with the collar of his dark coat turned up, two waistcoats, silver over blue, a white shirt and a white neckcloth. Notably, the composition has reduced the impact of Turner's prominent aquiline nose.

The painting may have been made in anticipation of or to mark Turner's election as an Associate member of the Royal Academy of Arts (ARA) in November 1799. It was donated to the British nation as part of the Turner Bequest on his death in 1851. It was held by the National Gallery until 1910, when it was transferred to the Tate Gallery.

This portrait was the basis for the depiction of Turner on the reverse of the Series G Bank of England £20 note issued from 2020, in front of a version of his 1838 painting The Fighting Temeraire.

In 2026, Dr. James Hamilton, a biographer of Turner and considered a leading expert on the painter, argued that the work is likely not by Turner himself, but by contemporaneous portrait specialist John Opie. Hamilton argues that the painting is stylistically consistent with Opie, and notes that "there’s nothing else" like it in Turner's work. He also states that the painting was described in early lists of Turner's work merely as a "portrait of Turner", and only became known as a "self-portrait" over time.

== See also ==
- Self-portraiture
- List of paintings by J. M. W. Turner

== Sources ==
- Self-Portrait, Joseph Mallord William Turner, c.1799, Tate Gallery
- Self-Portrait, JMW Turner (c1799), The Guardian, 5 May 2001
