= Greatest Painting in Britain Vote =

BBC survey of popular paintings

The Greatest Painting in Britain Vote was a survey made by BBC Radio 4's Today programme in Summer 2005 with the aim of discovering the best-loved painting in Britain, in the manner of 100 Greatest Britons and The Big Read. It was criticised for the conservatism of the final selection as well as the unsuitability of the idea for the non-visual medium of radio.

The winner, voted for by the public from a shortlist of 10, was announced on air on 5 September 2005.

== The Top Ten ==
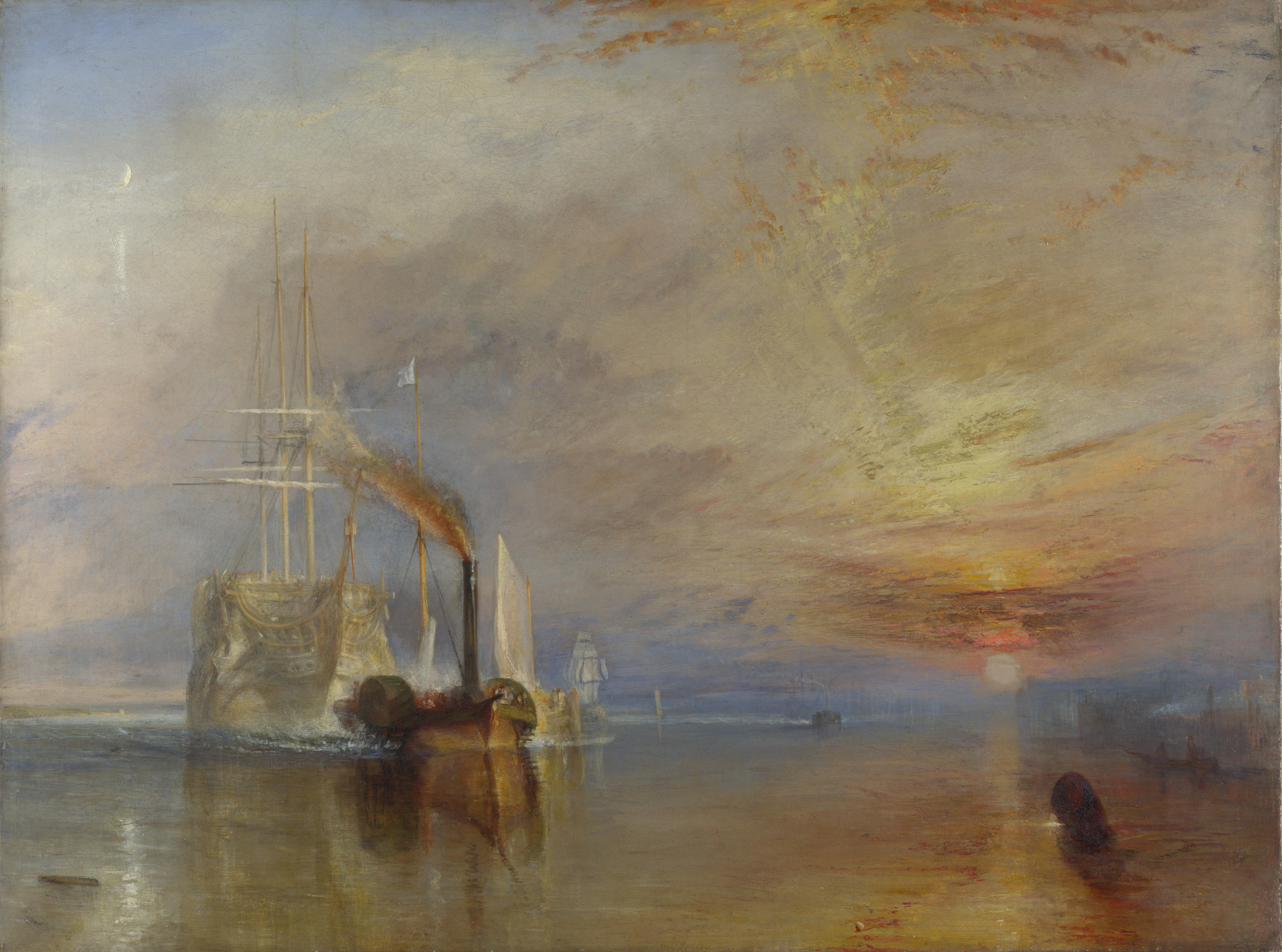
1. The Fighting Temeraire tugged to her last Berth to be broken up by J. M. W. Turner (National Gallery, London)

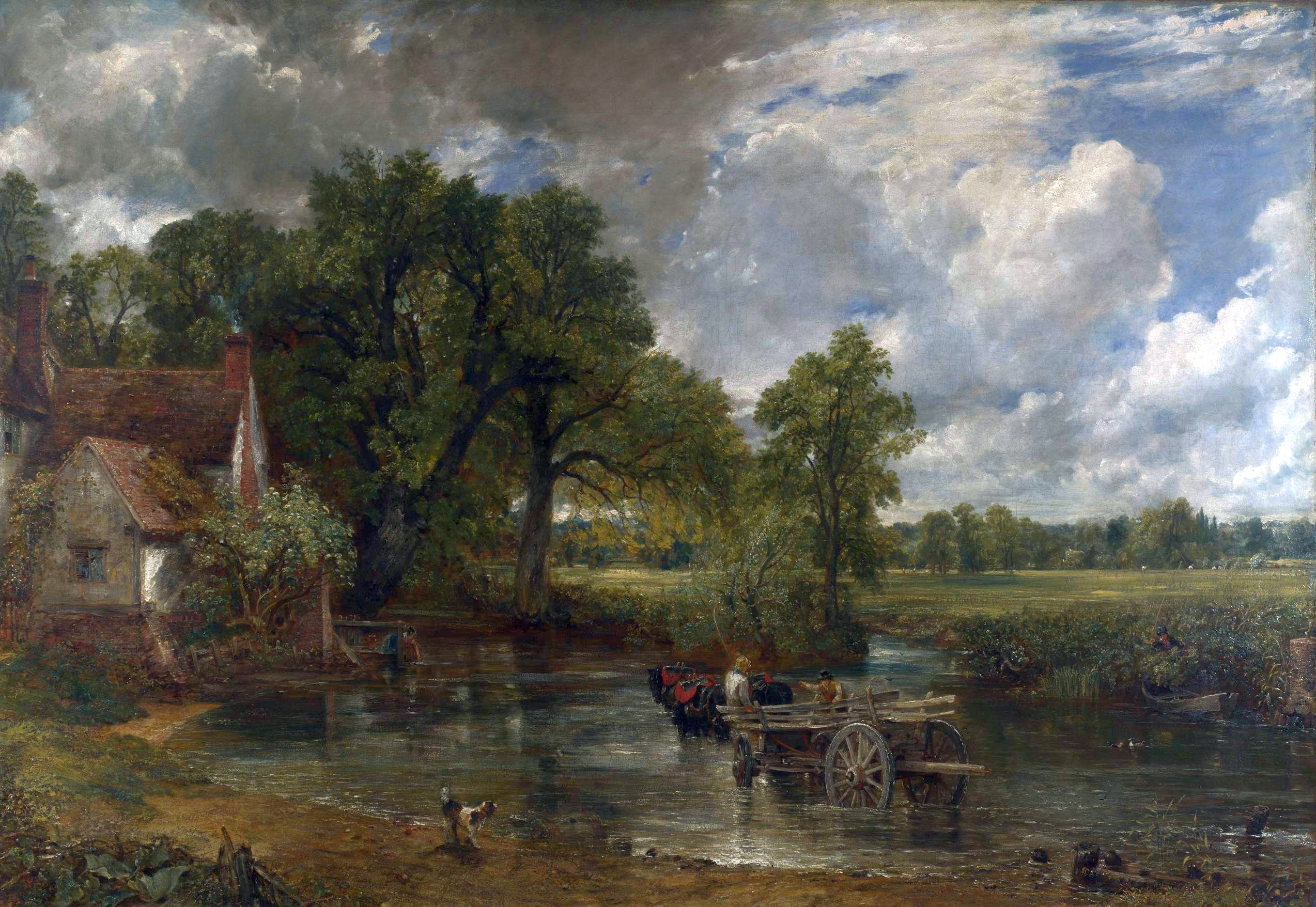
2. The Hay Wain by John Constable (National Gallery)

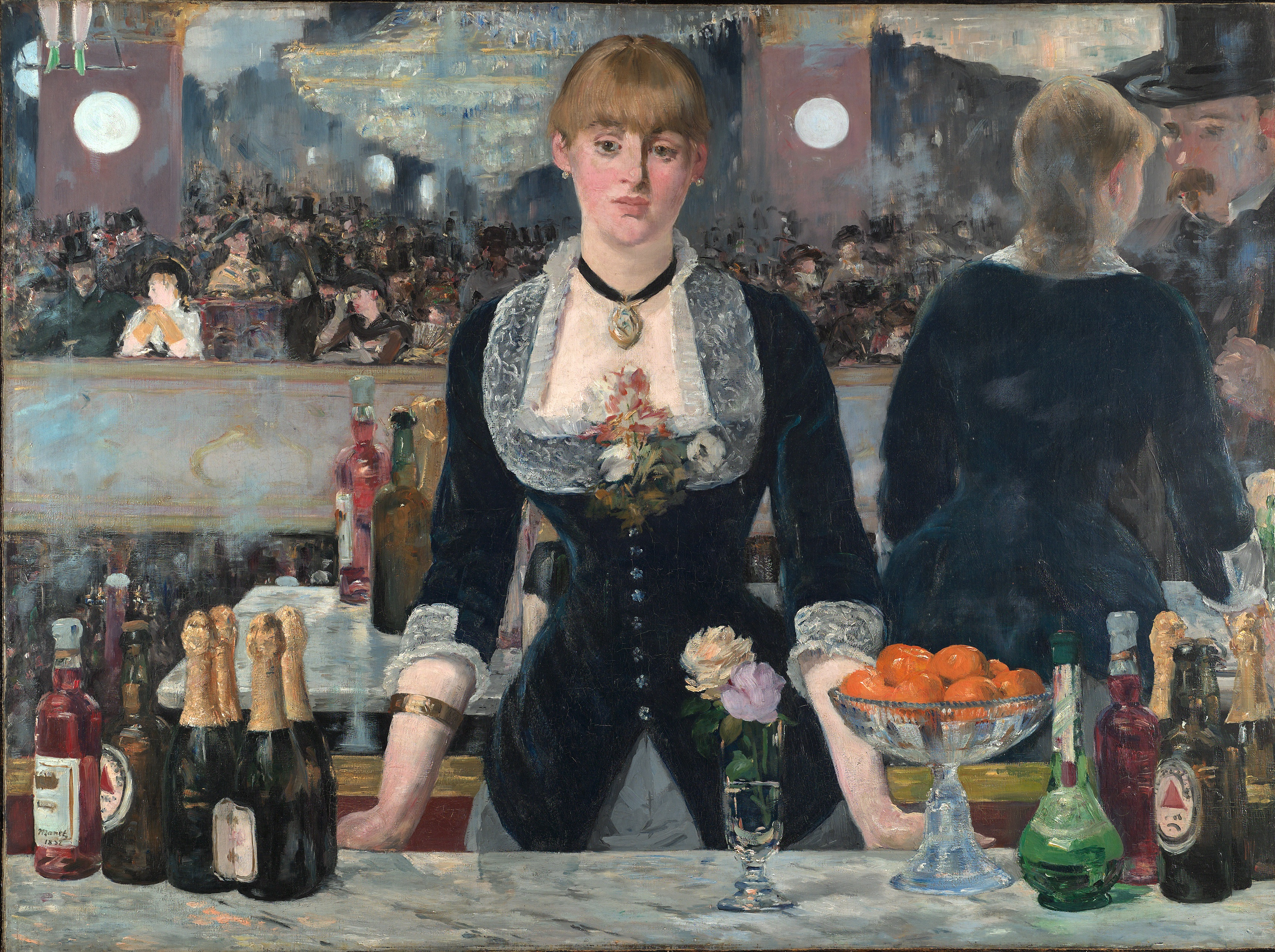
3. A Bar at the Folies-Bergère by Édouard Manet (Courtauld Gallery, London)

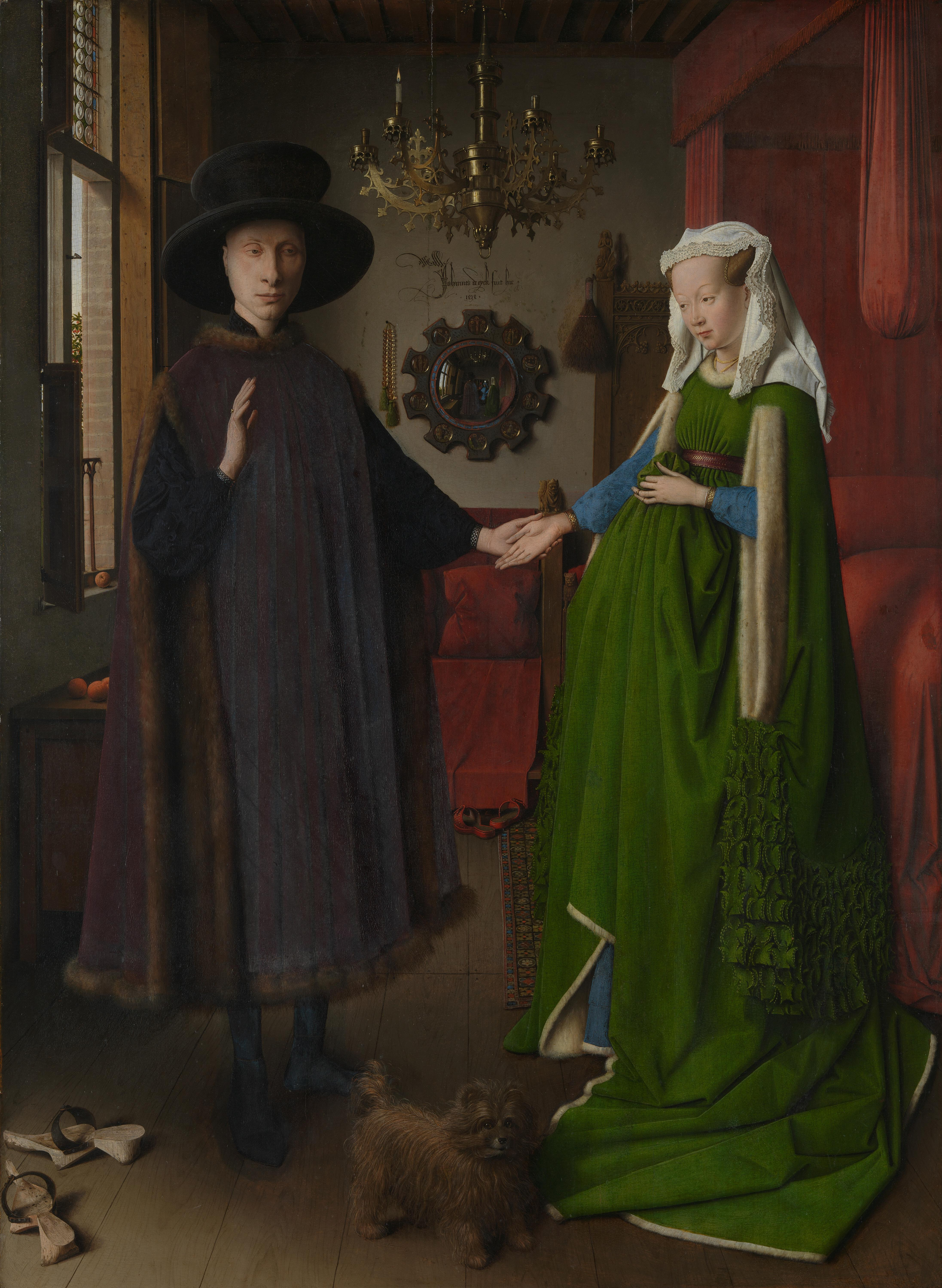
4. The Arnolfini Portrait by Jan van Eyck (National Gallery)

5. Mr and Mrs Clark and Percy 1970–1 by David Hockney (Tate Britain, London)
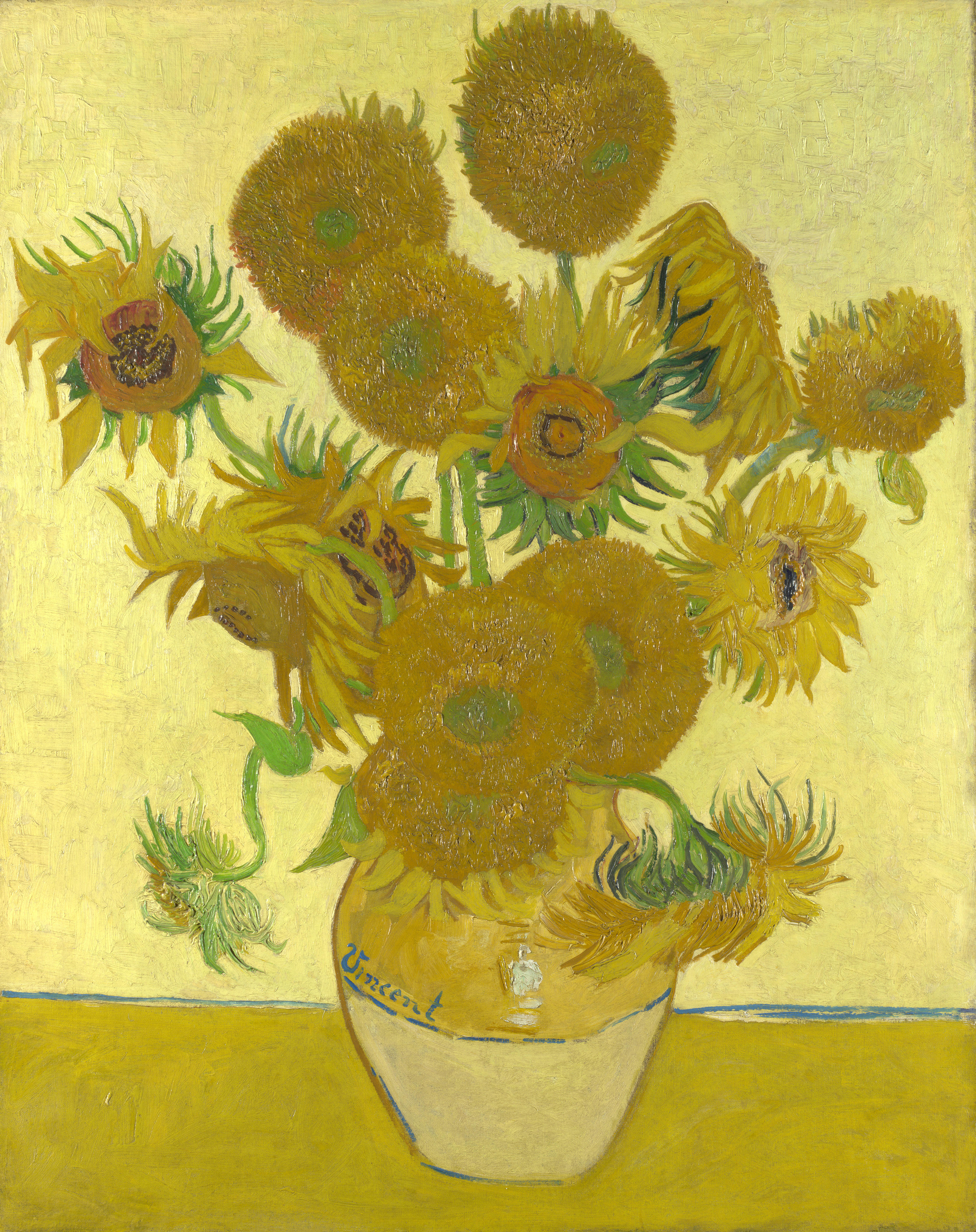
6. Sunflowers by Vincent van Gogh (National Gallery)

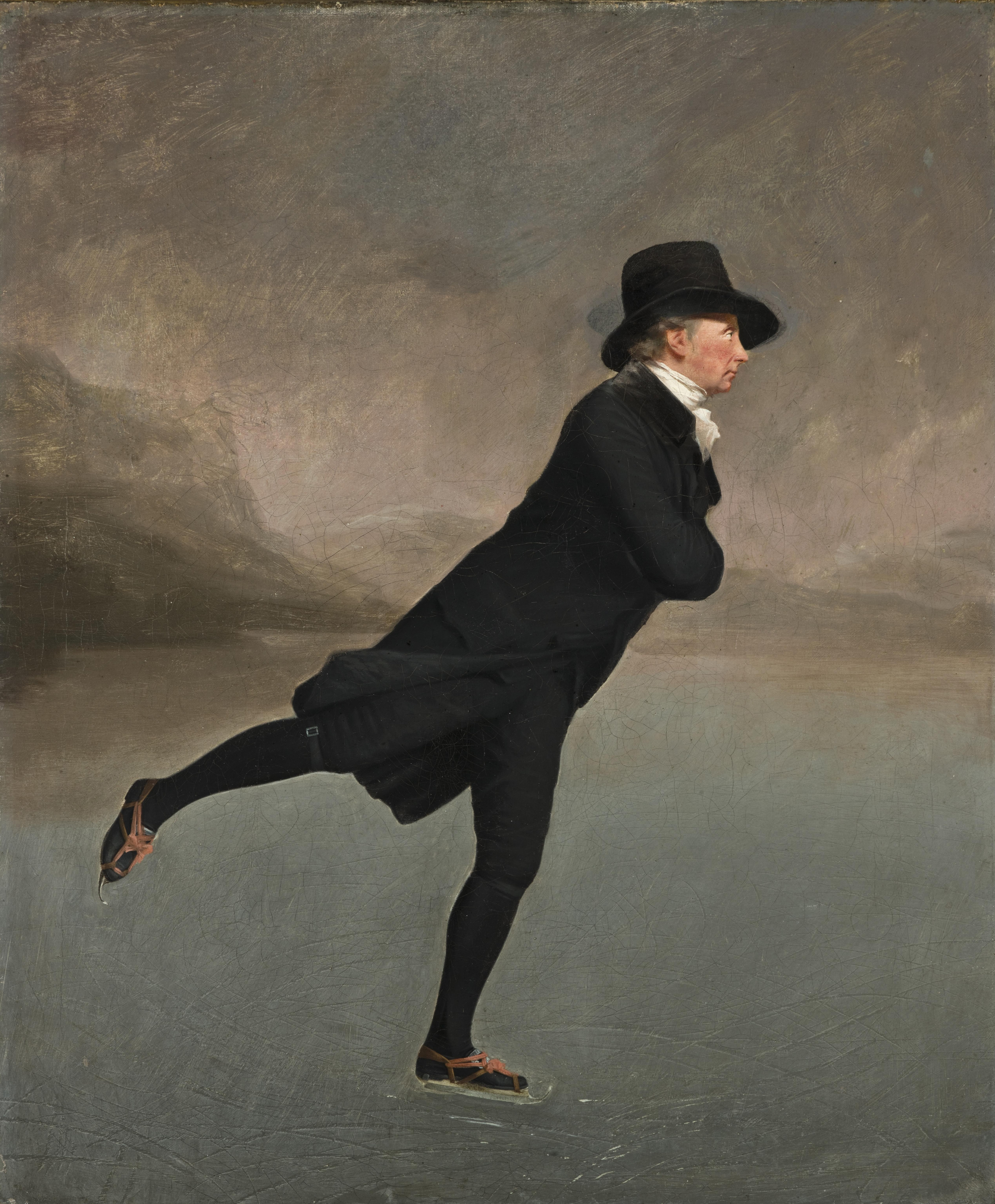
7. The Reverend Robert Walker Skating on Duddingston Loch by Sir Henry Raeburn (National Gallery of Scotland, Edinburgh)

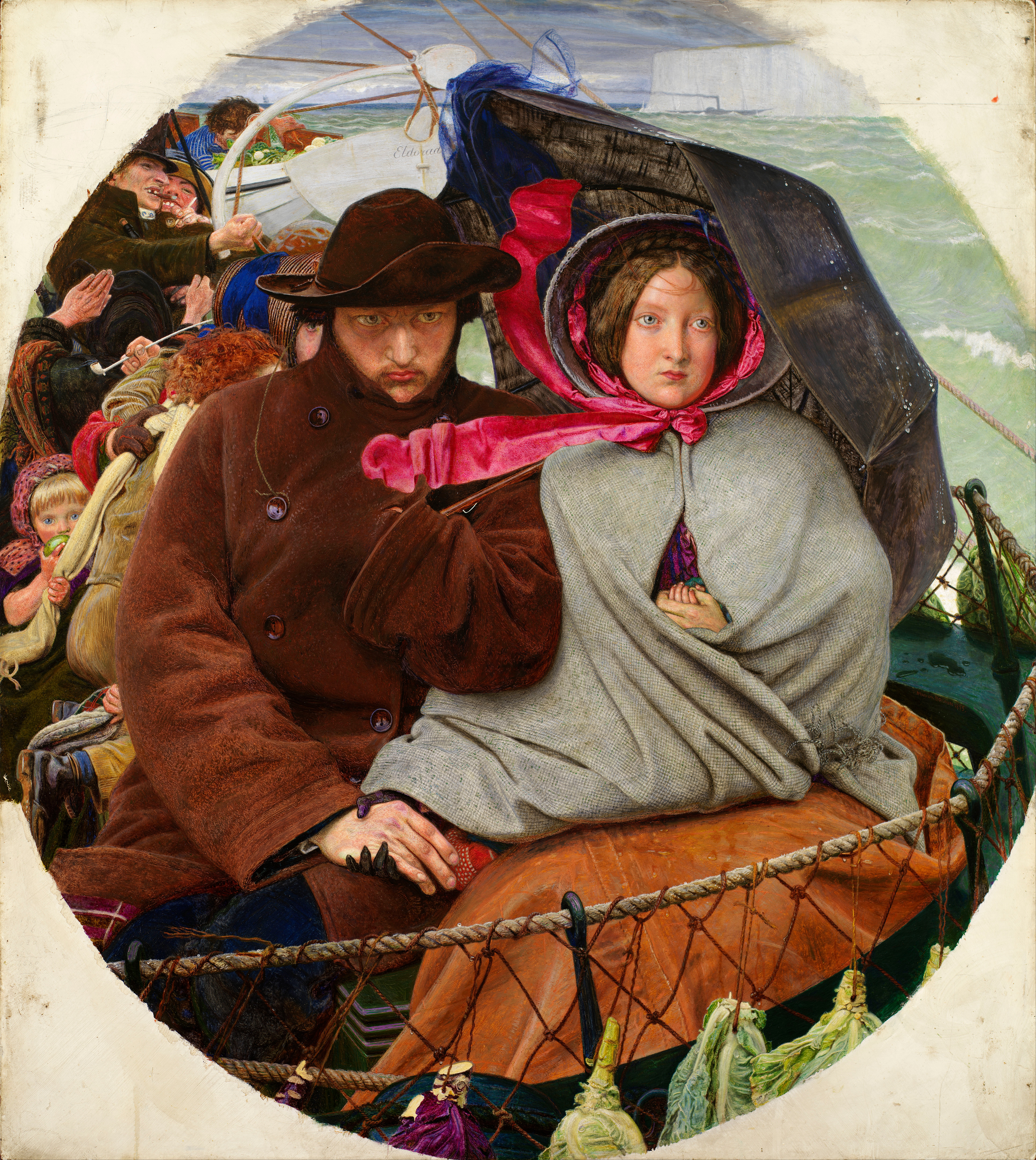
8. The Last of England by Ford Madox Brown (Fitzwilliam Museum, Cambridge and Birmingham Museum and Art Gallery)

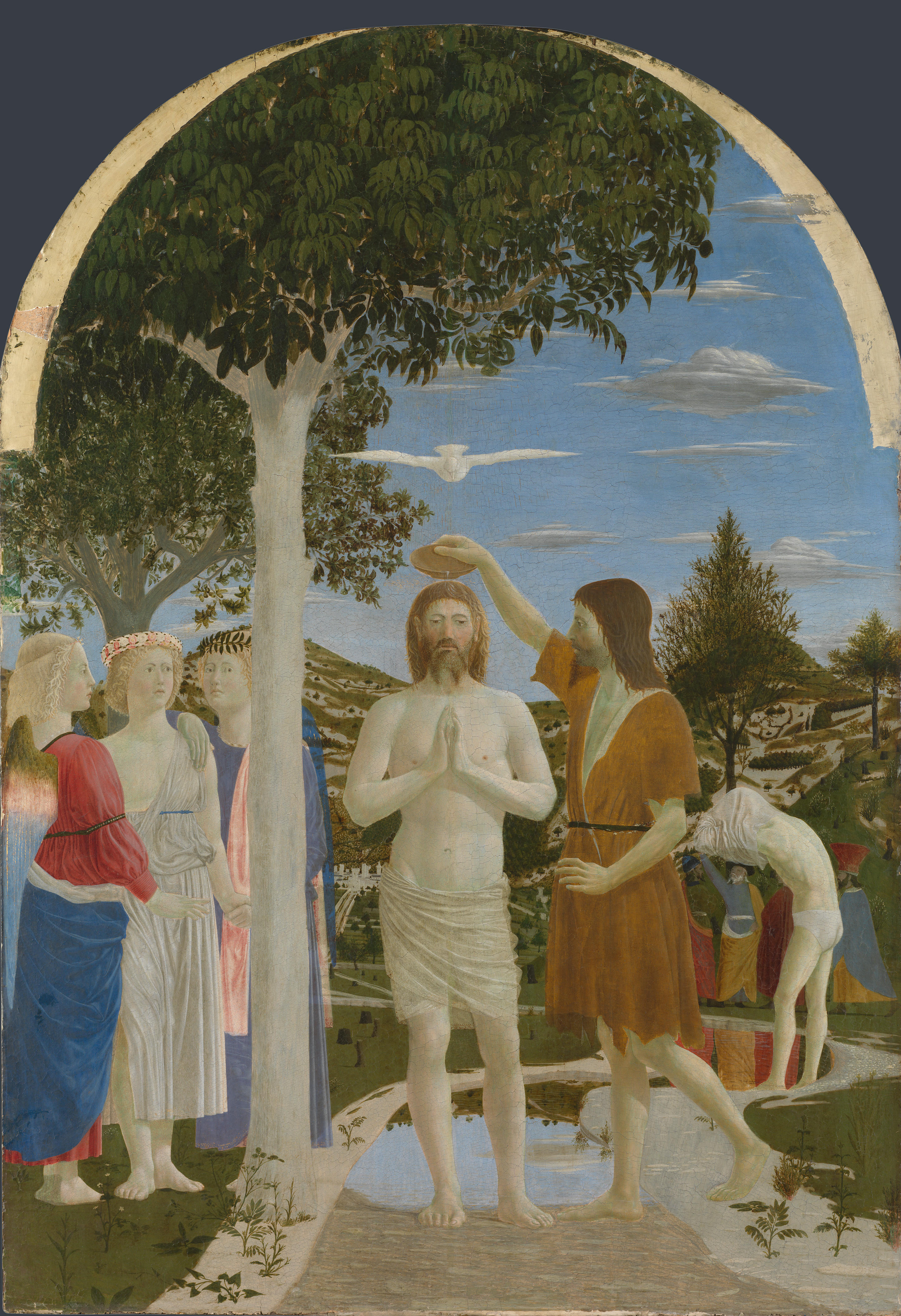
9. The Baptism of Christ by Piero della Francesca (National Gallery)

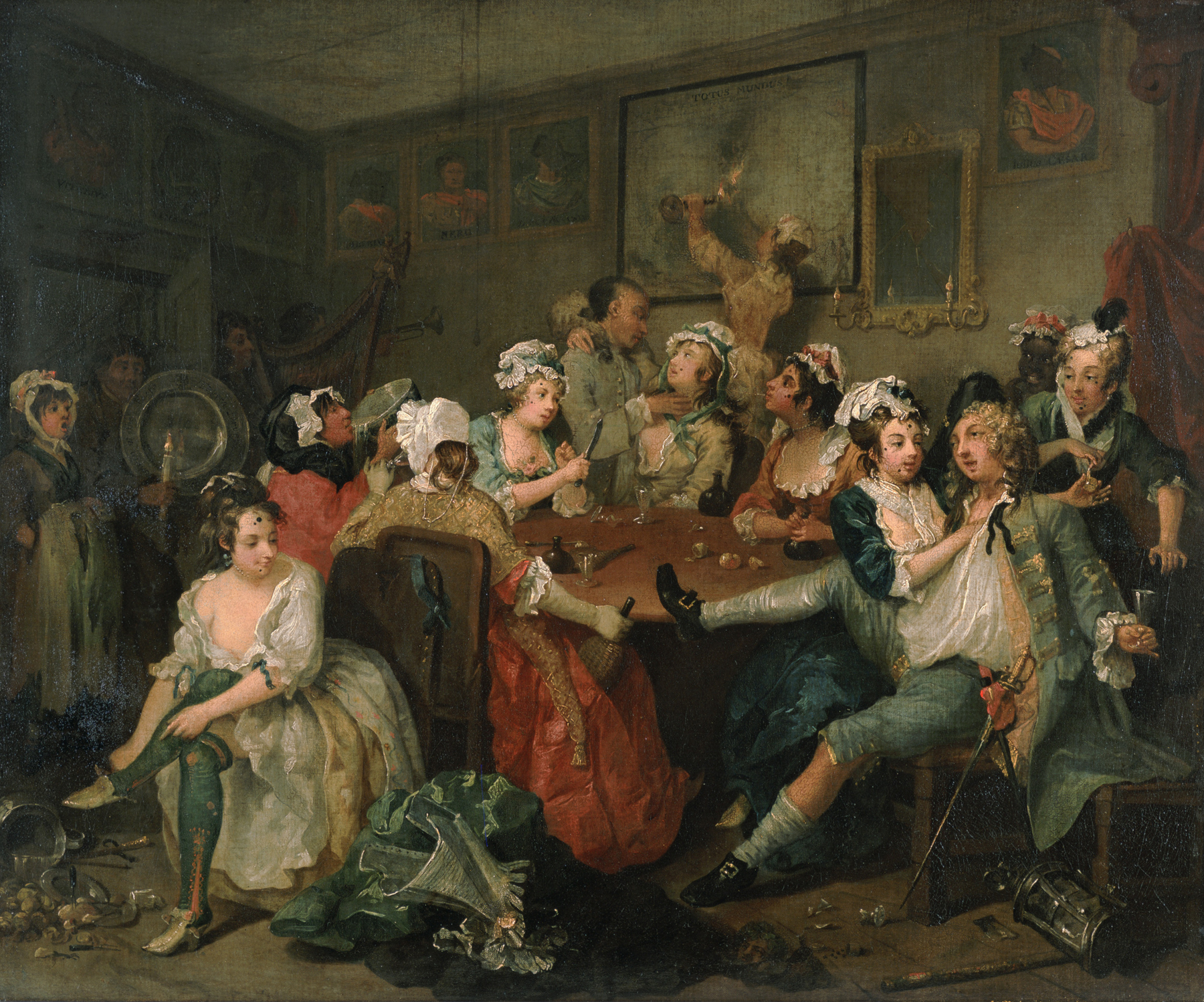
10. A Rake's Progress III: 'The Orgy' by William Hogarth (Sir John Soane's Museum, London)
