= The Fighting Temeraire =

Painting by J. M. W. Turner

The Fighting Temeraire, tugged to her last Berth to be broken up, 1838
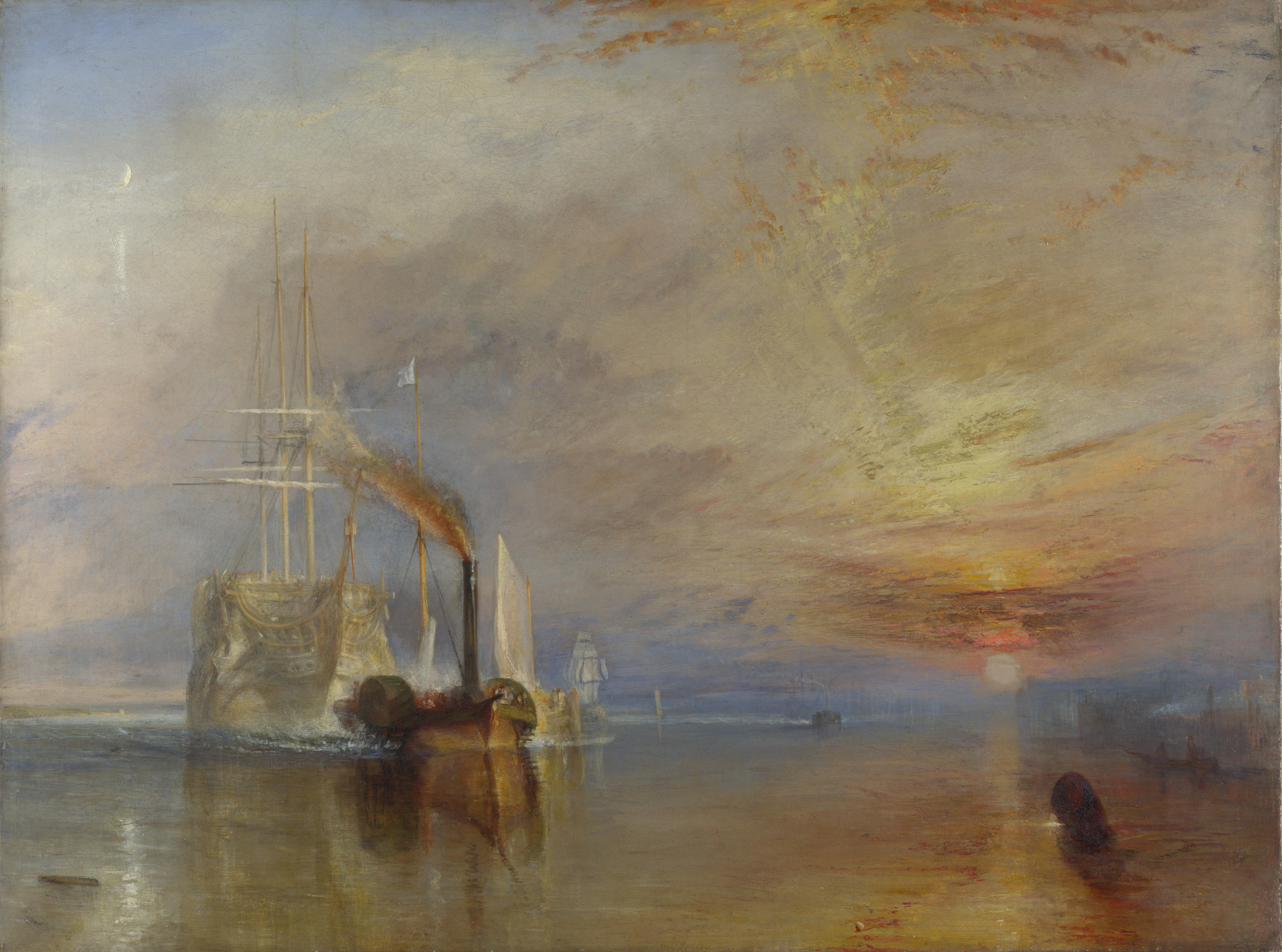
- Artist: J. M. W. Turner
- Year: 1839
- Medium: Oil on canvas
- Dimensions: 90.7 cm × 121.6 cm (35.7 in × 47.9 in)
- Location: National Gallery, London
- Website: nationalgallery.org.uk/...temeraire

The Fighting Temeraire, tugged to her last berth to be broken up, 1838 is an oil-on-canvas painting by the English artist Joseph Mallord William Turner, painted in 1838 and exhibited at the Royal Academy in 1839.

The painting depicts the 98-gun HMS Temeraire, one of the last second-rate ships of the line to have played a role in the Battle of Trafalgar, being towed up the Thames by a paddle-wheel steam tug in 1838, towards its final berth in Rotherhithe to be broken up for scrap.

The painting hangs in the National Gallery, London, having been bequeathed to the nation by the artist in 1851, as part of the Turner Bequest. In a poll organised by BBC Radio 4's Today programme in 2005, it was voted the nation's favourite painting. In 2020 it was included on the new £20 banknote, along with the artist's 1799 self-portrait.

== Background ==
When Turner came to paint this picture he was at the height of his career, having exhibited at the Royal Academy, London for 40 years. He was renowned for his highly atmospheric paintings in which he explored the subjects of the weather, the sea and the effects of light. He spent much of his life near the River Thames and did many paintings of ships and waterside scenes, both in watercolour and in oils. Turner frequently made small sketches and then worked them into finished paintings in the studio.

The current scholarly view is that it cannot be determined whether Turner actually witnessed the towing of the Temeraire, although several older accounts say that he watched the event from a variety of places on the river.

He used considerable artistic licence in the painting, which had a symbolic meaning that his first audience immediately appreciated. Turner was twenty-eight years old when Britain entered the Napoleonic Wars and "had a strong patriotic streak". The Temeraire was a well-known ship from her heroic performance at the Battle of Trafalgar in 1805, and her sale by the Admiralty had attracted substantial press coverage, which was probably what brought the subject to his attention. Instead of the Temeraire flying the Union Jack, the tug is flying a white flag, evidence of the ship's sale to a private company.

== Symbolism ==
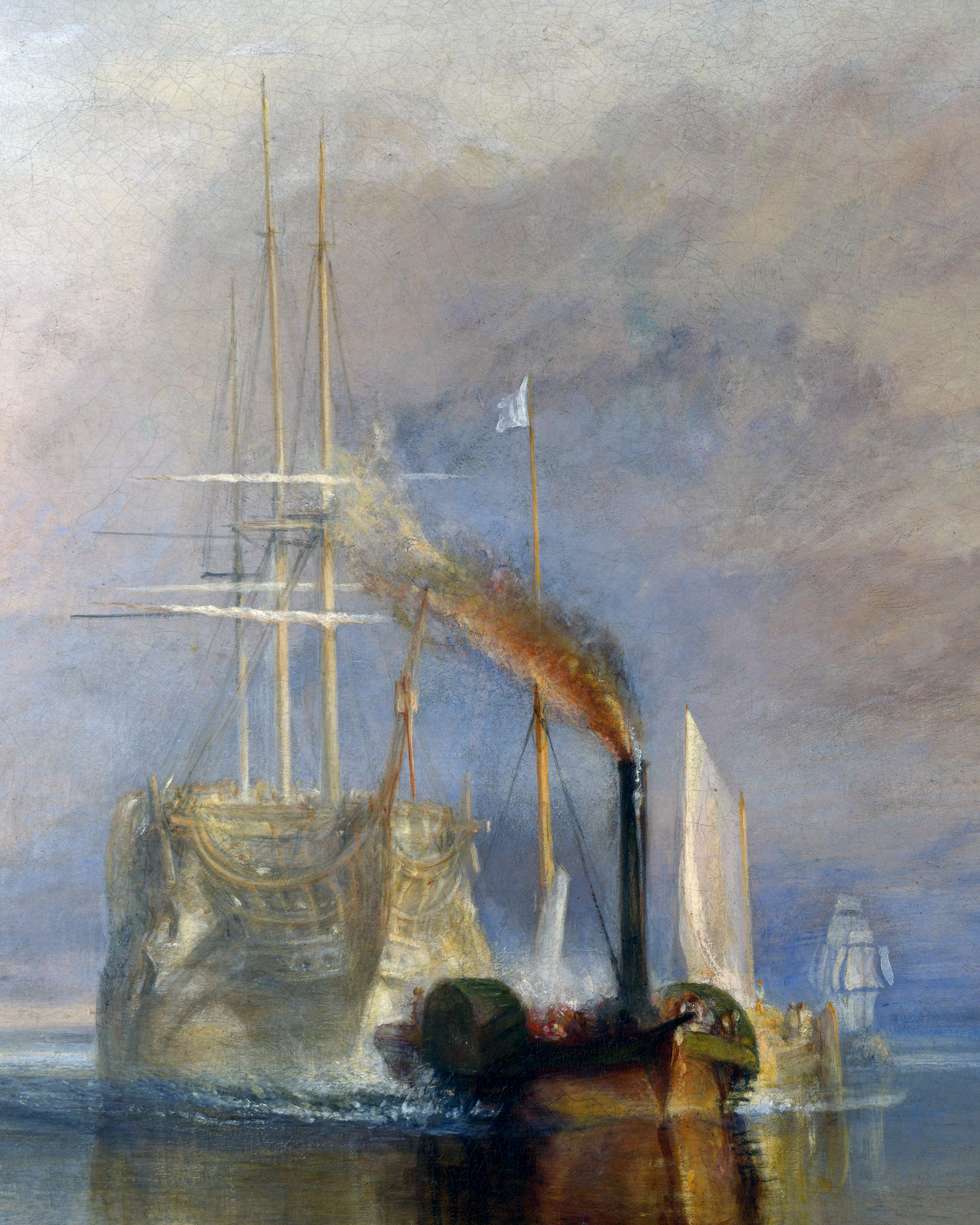
Detail of the old warship and tugboat

The composition of this painting is unusual in that the most significant object, the old warship, is positioned well to the left of the painting, where it rises in stately splendour and almost ghostlike colours against a triangle of blue sky and rising mist that throws it into relief. The beauty of the old ship contrasts with the dirty blackened tugboat with its tall smokestack, which churns the otherwise still surface of the river.

The blue triangle frames a second triangle of masted ships, which decrease in size as they become more distant. The Temeraire and tugboat have passed a small river craft with its gaff rigged sail barely catching a breeze. Beyond this a square-rigger drifts, with all its sail extended. Another small craft shows as a patch of white farther down the river. In the far distance, beyond a second tugboat which makes its way towards them, a three-masted ship rides at anchor. The becalmed vessels show the obsolescence of sail.

On the opposite side of the painting to Temeraire, the same distance from the frame as the ship's main mast, the Sun sets above the estuary, its rays extending into the clouds above it, and across the surface of the water. The red of the clouds is reflected in the river, repeating the colour of the smoke from the tugboat. The sun setting symbolises the end of an era; one where sail has been overtaken by steam.

Behind Temeraire, a sliver of Moon casts a beam across the river, symbolising the commencement of the new, industrial era. The demise of heroic strength is the main subject of the painting. It has been suggested that the ship stands for the artist himself, with an accomplished and glorious past but now contemplating his mortality. Turner called the work his "darling".

Sir Henry Newbolt later wrote a ballad titled The Fighting Temeraire, describing the same scene: "And she's fading down the river, But in England's song for ever, She's the Fighting Téméraire."

According to art historian Matt Wilson, the current interpretation of The Fighting Temeraire—according to which Turner wanted to express nostalgia for a bygone era, in which steam power had not yet replaced wind power—is incorrect. On the contrary, Turner wanted to celebrate modernity and demonstrate how it is possible to find beauty in every manifestation of human creativity

The most important lessons to learn from The Fighting Temeraire are about Turner's attitude and outlook. It embodies his refusal to be daunted by newness or enslaved by traditional artistic values. His quest to find the beauty and grandeur of modern experience, and leave the past behind, is magnificently on display in The Fighting Temeraire. And these qualities are truly his lasting legacy to modern art.

== Artistic licence ==
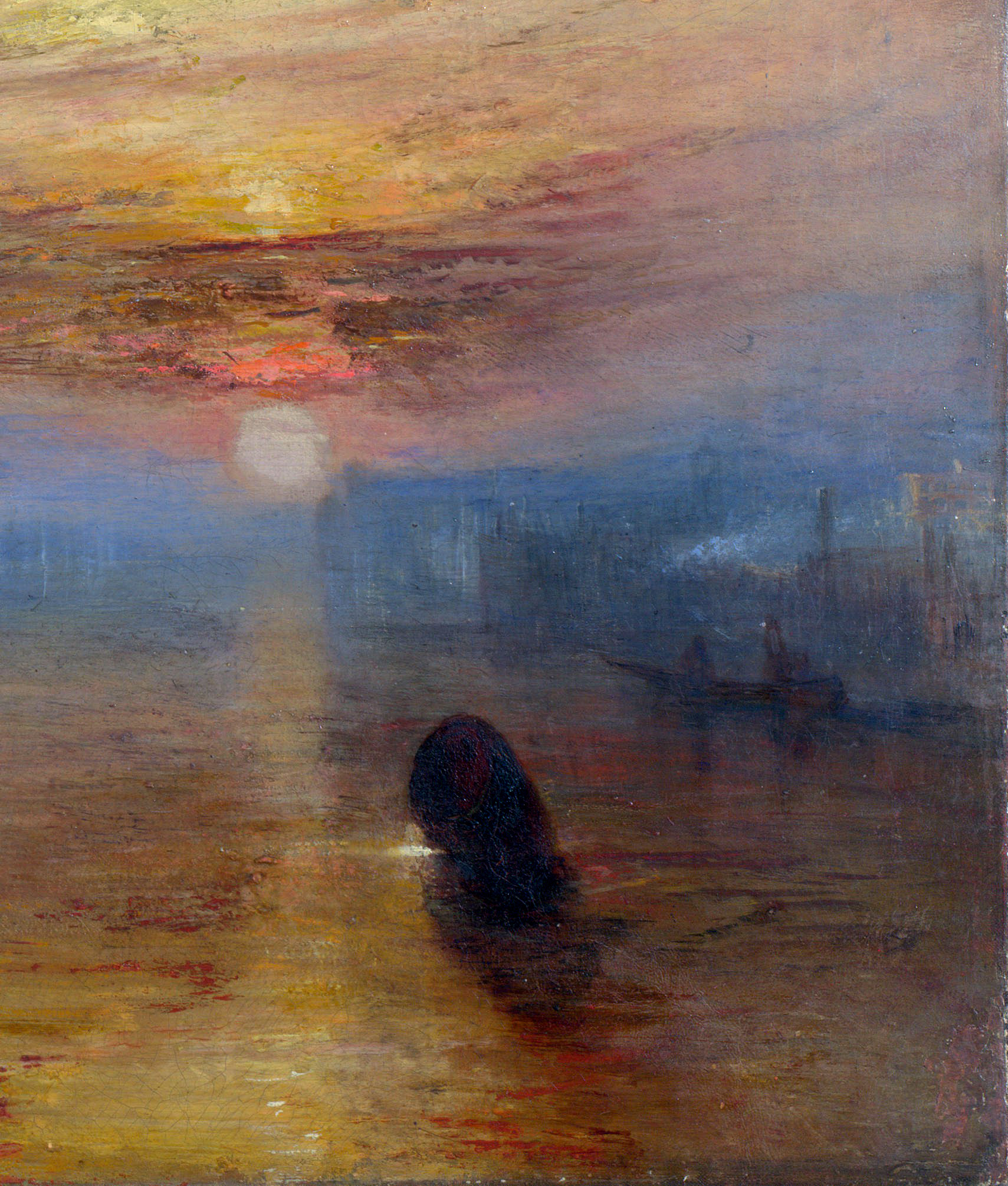
Detail of bottom right corner

Turner took a degree of artistic licence with the painting. The ship was known to her crew as "Saucy", rather than "Fighting" Temeraire. Before being sold to the ship-breaker John Beatson, the ship had been lying at Sheerness Dockyard, and was then moved to his wharf at Rotherhithe, then in Surrey but now in Southwark. As shown in a "prosaic drawing, made on the spot by a trained observer" (William Beatson, the ship-breaker's brother) and turned into a lithograph, her masts and rigging were removed before her sale and journey to the breaker's yard. All of her cannon, anchors and assorted hardware had been removed and salvaged for the navy to use as spare parts. She was towed by two tugboats, not just one, and in the other direction (the sun sets in the west, while the Thames estuary is at the river's eastern end). One of the tugboats, that depicted in the painting, was John Rogers Watkins' Monarch.

== History of the painting ==
When exhibited at the Royal Academy Exhibition of 1839 the painting was a considerable success, praised in various of the lengthy press reviews that the Summer Exhibitions then received as a "grand image of the last days of one of Britain's bulwarks" as The Spectator put it. The novelist William Makepeace Thackeray, reviewing for Fraser's Magazine "in the form of mostly facetious letters" supposedly by "Michael Angelo Titmarsh Esq." abandoned his usual flippant tone when discussing "as grand a picture as ever figured on the walls of any academy, or came from the easel of any painter". Turner displayed the painting in 1839 accompanied by an altered excerpt from Thomas Campbell's poem Ye Mariners of England, reading:

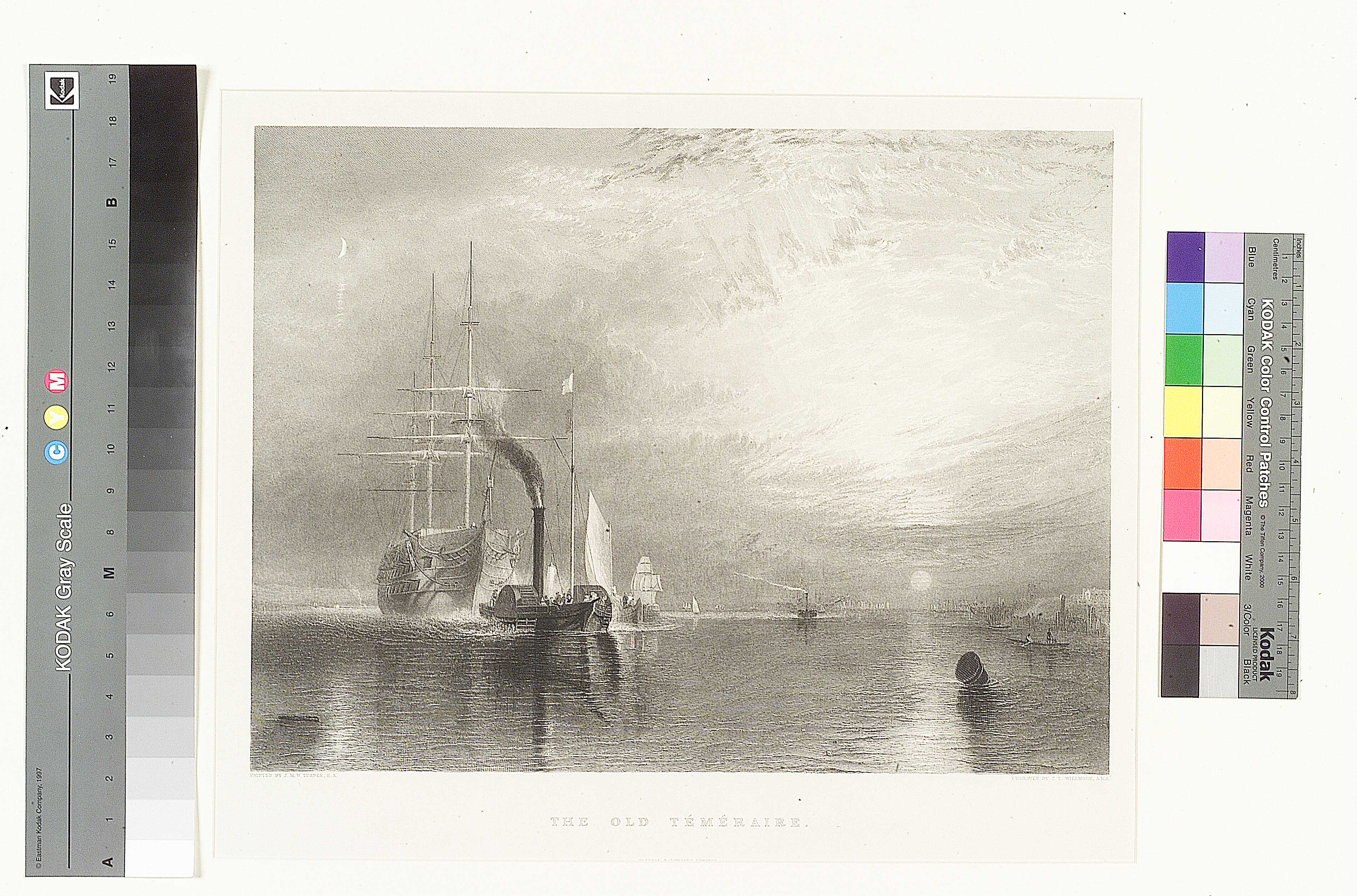
Turner objected to this 1845 engraving by James Tibbits Willmore correcting the painting by putting the mast of the tug before its smokestack

The flag which braved the battle and the breeze,
No longer owns her.

Turner kept the painting in his studio, which also functioned as a showroom for buyers, until his death. In 1844 he loaned it as part of his deal for reproductions to the print publisher J. Hogarth, who exhibited it at his premises, but about a year later wrote a draft note replying to another request saying that "no consid[eratio]ns of money or favour can induce me to lend my Darling again". Hogarth's steel engraving by James Tibbits Willmore, who had often engraved Turners, was published in 1845 and was the first of many reproductions in various techniques. In about 1848 Turner refused an offer to buy the painting reputed to have been £5,000, followed by a "blank cheque", having determined to leave it to the nation, and already being very well-off.

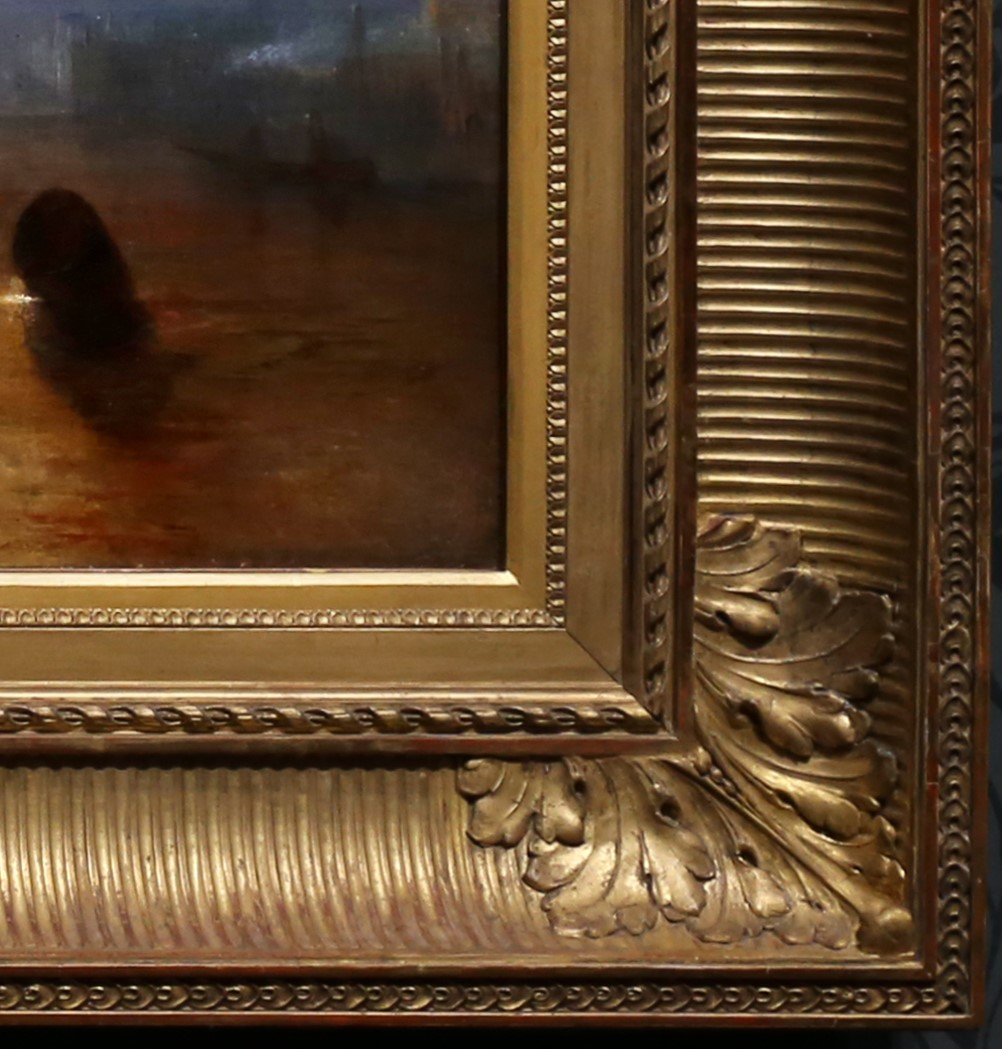
Detail of the frame

It was evidently usually among the works on display in the studio, and is mentioned by several visitors. He intended to leave his paintings to the nation but the terms of his will were unclear and after his death in 1851 his will was contested by relatives, and several years of litigation were only ended in 1856, when this and a large body of other work entered the collection of the National Gallery. Most of the "Turner Bequest" was turned over to Tate Britain when that was established in 1897, but the Fighting Temeraire remained in the National Gallery. It was in the Tate Gallery (as it then was) from 1910 to 1914 and 1960 to 1961, and for six months in 1987 to mark the opening of the Clore Gallery there, which houses the rest of the Bequest. In 1947–48 it went on a European tour to Amsterdam, Bern, Paris, Brussels, Liège, ending at the Venice Biennale. In 1952 it was exhibited in Cape Town.

The picture remains in "exceptionally good condition", apart from slightly discoloured varnish, and seems never to have received conservation treatment beyond the removal of surface dirt in 1945 and a lining in 1963. X-ray images reveal that Turner seems to have used a canvas on which he had started another marine picture, with a large sail where the tugboat's above-deck structures now are.

== In popular culture and on currency ==
The painting is used in the 2012 James Bond film Skyfall to be symbolic of Bond's age and standing within MI6.

In February 2020, the Bank of England introduced a new polymer £20 note, featuring Turner's c. 1799 self-portrait, with The Fighting Temeraire in the background. The quote "Light is therefore colour" from an 1818 lecture by Turner, and a copy of his signature as made on his will are also included.

The painting is the inspiration for the "Glowing Painting" found in the 2020 Nintendo series Animal Crossing: New Horizons.

== See also ==
- List of paintings by J. M. W. Turner
