= Bank of England £20 note =

Banknote in England and Wales

Twenty pounds
- Country: United Kingdom; (predominantly England and Wales)
- Value: £20 sterling
- Width: 139 mm
- Height: 73 mm
- Security features: See-through windows the larger one with a purple border and the King's/Queen's portrait, blue and gold foil on the front, silver foil on the back in the shape of Margate lighthouse, smaller window at the bottom right corner, raised dots, finely detailed round purple metallic image containing the letter "T", blue and pink foil patch with a 3D image of the Coronation Crown, micro lettering, textured print, UV feature, hologram
- Material used: Polymer
- Years of printing: 1725–1943; 1970–1991; 1991–2000; 1999–2007; 2007–2020; 2020–2022; 2023–present (current design)

Obverse
- Design: King Charles III
- Design date: 5 June 2024

Reverse
- Design: J. M. W. Turner and The Fighting Temeraire
- Design date: 5 June 2024

The Bank of England £20 note is a sterling banknote circulated in the United Kingdom, particularly in England and Wales. (Note: Other £20 banknotes are more commonly used in Scotland and Northern Ireland) It is the second-highest denomination of banknote currently issued by the Bank of England. The current polymer note, first issued on 5 June 2024, bears the image of King Charles III on the obverse. The other note first issued on 20 February 2020, bears the image of the late Queen Elizabeth II on the obverse and the image of painter J. M. W. Turner on the reverse. It replaced the cotton paper note featuring a portrait of economist Adam Smith, first issued in 2007.

== History ==
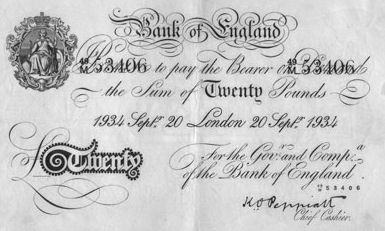
£20 note, issued from London in 1934.

Twenty pound notes were introduced by the Bank of England for the first time in 1725. The earliest notes were handwritten, and were issued to individuals as needed. These notes were written on one side only and bore the name of the payee, the date, and the signature of the issuing cashier. With the exception of the Restriction Period between 1797 and 1821 when the French Revolutionary Wars and the Napoleonic Wars caused a bullion shortage, these notes could be exchanged in full, or in part, for an equivalent amount of gold when presented at the bank. If redeemed in part, the banknote would be signed to indicate the amount that had been redeemed. From 1853 printed notes replaced handwritten notes, with the declaration "I promise to pay the bearer on demand the sum of twenty pounds" replacing the name of the payee. This declaration remains on Bank of England banknotes to this day. A printed signature of one of three cashiers appeared on the printed notes, though this was replaced by the signature of the Chief Cashier from 1870 onward.

The right to redeem banknotes for gold ceased in 1931 when Britain stopped using the gold standard. The twenty pound note ceased to be produced by the Bank of England in 1943, and it was not until 1970 with the introduction of the series D notes that the denomination reappeared. The predominantly purple series D notes were two-sided, with an image of Queen Elizabeth II appearing on one side, accompanied by an image of Saint George and the Dragon (all subsequent Bank of England notes also feature an image of the Queen) and an image of William Shakespeare appearing on the other. This note also had a security feature in the form of a "windowed" metal thread. The thread is woven into the paper so that it forms a dashed line, yet appears as a single line when held up to the light. Series D notes were phased out in favour of the newer series E notes beginning in 1991. These notes were multicoloured (predominantly mauve-purple) and featured an image of scientist Michael Faraday on the back. Series E notes were replaced by a variant design from 1999 onwards. These are broadly similar to the earlier series E notes but feature Edward Elgar on the reverse.

The most prevalent paper £20 note was introduced in 2007. It features a portrait of Scottish economist Adam Smith on the back as well as an illustration of workers in a pin factory. The note features a number of security features in addition to the metallic thread: these include raised print, a watermark, microlettering, a holographic strip, a see-through register, and a colourful pattern which only appears under ultraviolet light.

In September 2015 the Bank of England announced that the next £20 note would be printed on polymer, rather than cotton paper. This was followed by an announcement in April 2016 that Adam Smith would be replaced by artist J. M. W. Turner on the next £20 note, which entered circulation on 20 February 2020. Images on the reverse of the Turner note include a c.1799 self-portrait of Turner, a version of Turner's The Fighting Temeraire, the quote "Light is therefore colour" from an 1818 lecture by Turner, and a copy of Turner's signature as made on his will. Like all polymer banknotes issued by the Bank of England, the polymer £20 note features a transparent window to counteract forgery, and raised dots resembling Braille to assist identification by the visually-impaired.

== Designs ==
Note	First issued	Last issued	Ceased to be legal tender	Colour	Size	Design	Additional information
White	1725	1943	16 April 1945	Monochrome; Printed on one side only	211 × 133 mm (may vary)		Denomination discontinued from 1945 until 1970
Series D	9 July 1970	1991	19 March 1993	Predominantly purple	160 × 90 mm	Front: Queen Elizabeth II; Back: William Shakespeare	First £20 note to carry a portrait of a monarch and used a "windowed" security thread (July 1984 onward)
Series E	5 June 1991	2000	28 February 2001	Multicoloured (predominantly mauve-purple)	149 × 80 mm	Front: Queen Elizabeth II; Back: Michael Faraday	Those notes issued from September 1993 have an additional denomination symbol £20 on each side
Series E (variant)	22 June 1999	2007	30 June 2010	Multicoloured (predominantly mauve-purple)	149 × 80 mm	Front: Queen Elizabeth II; Back: Edward Elgar	
Series F	13 March 2007	2020	30 September 2022	Multicoloured (predominantly mauve-purple)	149 × 80 mm	Front: Queen Elizabeth II; Back: Adam Smith	
Series G (I)	20 February 2020	2022		Multicoloured (predominantly mauve-purple)	139 × 73 mm	Front: Queen Elizabeth II; Back: J. M. W. Turner	Polymer note
Series G (II)	5 June 2024			Multicoloured (predominantly mauve-purple)	139 × 73 mm	Front: King Charles III; Back: J. M. W. Turner	First King Charles III notes

Information taken from the Bank of England website.

== See also ==
- Bank of England note issues
- Memorials to William Shakespeare
