= Bank of England £10,000,000 note =

Non-circulating Bank of England banknote

Ten million pounds
- Country: United Kingdom
- Value: £10,000,000 sterling
- Width: 228 mm
- Height: 152 mm
- Security features: Requires the signature of the existing Chief Cashier at the Bank of England

Obverse
- Design: Britannia

Reverse
- Design: Blank

The Bank of England £10,000,000 banknote was a non-circulating Bank of England sterling banknote that was issued under the Treasury Bills Act of 1877. By the early 2000s these instruments were still legally valid but had become largely ceremonial in appearance, used only for short‑term government financing and redeemed within a few weeks. The ornate, banknote‑like layout reflects older security‑printing traditions rather than modern practice.

Until 2003, these Treasury notes were issued by the Bank of England, in the City of London. HM Treasury would manage its cash and ensure that adequate funds were available. London's banks and other financial institutions would bid for these instruments, at a discount, specifying which day the following week they wanted the bills issued. Maturities would be for one, three, six, or theoretically but not practically, twelve months. The tenders were for the face value of the Treasury Notes, less a discount, which represented the interest rate. This system was replaced by a computerised system by the Debt Management Office, which is an executive agency of HM Treasury, and the last Treasury Notes were printed in September 2003. These notes would often get traded to other banks, so they did circulate; this was done without the Bank of England's knowledge, and the notes would be redeemed by the Bank of England on their date of maturity by the bearer.

A £10,000,000 Treasury Bill, stamped "cancelled", sold for £17,000 at auction in London on 29 September 2014 by Dix Noonan Webb.

== See also ==
- Bank of England £1,000,000 note
- Bank of England £100,000,000 note
- Bank of England note issues
- United States one hundred-thousand-dollar bill
