= Bank of England £50 note =

Banknote in England and Wales

Fifty pounds
- Country: United Kingdom; (predominantly England and Wales)
- Value: £50 sterling
- Width: 146 mm
- Height: 77 mm
- Security features: See-through windows the larger one with the King's/Queen's portrait a maroon border on both the front and back, with gold and green foil squares on the front and silver foil squares on the back, the image squares on the front changes between a "50" and a "£" symbol when the note is tilted, second smaller window at the bottom right corner, raised dots, finely detailed shaped red metallic shape containing the letters "A" and "T", turquoise, lilac and pink foil patch with a 3D image of the Coronation Crown, micro-lettering, textured print, UV feature, hologram
- Material used: Polymer
- Years of printing: 1725–1943; 1981–1994; 1994–2011; 2011–2021; 2021–2022; 2023–present (current design)

Obverse
- Design: King Charles III
- Design date: 5 June 2024

Reverse
- Design: Alan Turing
- Designer: Elliott & Fry
- Design date: 5 June 2024

The Bank of England £50 note is a sterling banknote circulated in the United Kingdom, particularly in England and Wales. (Note: Other £50 banknotes are more commonly used in Scotland and Northern Ireland) It is the highest denomination of banknote currently issued for public circulation by the Bank of England. (Note: The Bank of England issues plain notes in the values of £1 million and £100 million for internal use.) The current note, the second of this denomination to be printed in polymer, entered circulation on 5 June 2024. It bears the images of King Charles III on the obverse and computer scientist and World War II codebreaker Alan Turing on the reverse, with his birth date reflecting the release date. Cotton £50 notes from the previous series remained in circulation alongside the new polymer notes until 30 September 2022, when the last "paper" banknote issue finally ceased to be legal tender.

== History ==
£50 notes were introduced by the Bank of England for the first time in 1725. The earliest notes were handwritten and were issued as needed to individuals. These notes were written on one side only and bore the name of the payee, the date, and the signature of the issuing cashier. With the exception of the Restriction Period between 1797 and 1821, when the French Revolutionary Wars and the Napoleonic Wars caused a bullion shortage, these notes could be exchanged in full, or in part, for an equivalent amount of gold when presented at the bank. If redeemed in part, the banknote would be signed to indicate the amount that had been redeemed. From 1853 printed notes replaced handwritten notes, with the declaration "I promise to pay the bearer on demand the sum of fifty pounds" replacing the name of the payee. This declaration remains on Bank of England banknotes to this day. A printed signature of one of three cashiers appeared on the printed notes, although this was replaced by the signature of the Chief Cashier from 1870 onwards.

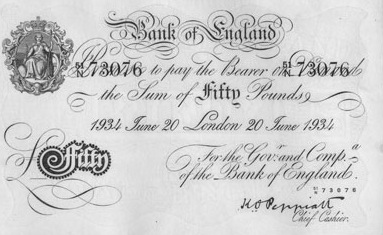
A £50 note, issued in 1934

The ability to redeem banknotes for gold ceased in 1931 when Britain stopped using the gold standard. The £50 note ceased to be produced by the Bank of England in 1943 and did not reappear until it was reintroduced in 1981. These D series notes were predominantly olive green on both sides, with an image of Queen Elizabeth II on the front (as with all subsequent £50 notes) and an image of architect Christopher Wren on the back. As a security feature, this note had a metallic thread running through it, which was upgraded to a "windowed" thread from July 1988 onward. The thread is woven into the paper such that it forms a dashed line, yet appears as a single line when held up to the light. The series D note was gradually replaced by the series E, beginning in 1994. This reddish note replaced Christopher Wren with John Houblon, the first governor of the Bank of England, on the reverse. As an additional security feature, these notes had a foil patch on the front. The E revision series did not have a £50 note.

The 2011 £50 note features two portraits on the reverse: engineer and scientist James Watt and industrialist and entrepreneur Matthew Boulton, along with the Whitbread Engine and the Soho Manufactory. The note has a number of security features in addition to the metallic thread, including motion thread, raised print, a watermark, microlettering, a see-through registration device, and a colourful pattern that only appears under ultraviolet light. It is the first Bank of England banknote to feature two people on the reverse, and the first Bank of England note to feature the motion thread security feature. This is an image in a broken green thread that moves as the note is viewed from different angles.

The new Series G £50 note was brought into circulation in June 2021; it is the last of the Bank of England's notes to switch from paper to polymer. The reverse of the note features a portrait of mathematician and codebreaker Alan Turing.

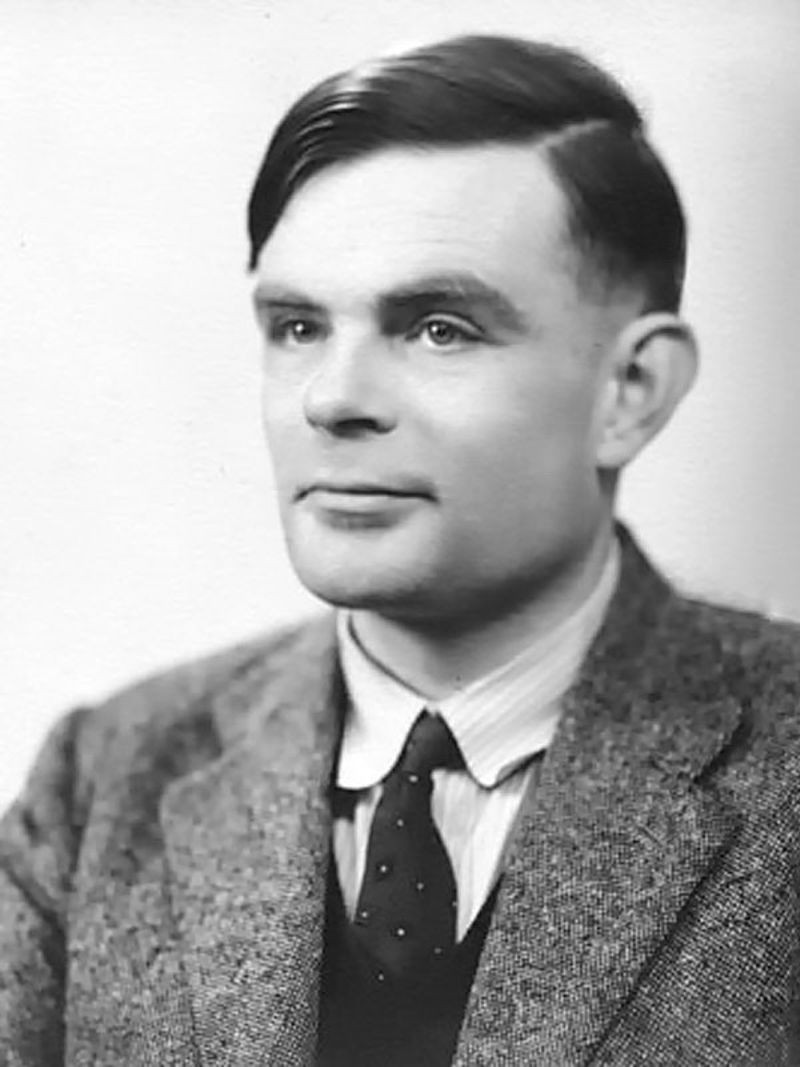
This image of Alan Turing was selected by the Bank of England in 2019.

Suggestions were sought by the Bank for eligible scientists prior to Turing's selection. Some 227,299 nominations covering 989 scientists were received, and the shortlist eventually consisted of (in individuals and pairs) Mary Anning, Paul Dirac, Rosalind Franklin, William Herschel and Caroline Herschel, Dorothy Hodgkin, Ada Lovelace and Charles Babbage, Stephen Hawking, James Clerk Maxwell, Srinivasa Ramanujan, Ernest Rutherford, Frederick Sanger, and Alan Turing.

== Use and future ==
As of 2019, the £50 note was not widely used in the UK. Its lack of common handling has led to some retailers refusing it for payment.

Peter Sands, an advisor to the British Government and former Chief Executive of Standard Chartered, has raised concern with the Bank of England over high denomination notes and their role in tax evasion. He claimed that scrapping the £50, and other high denomination notes such as the 1000 Swiss francs, €500 and 100 United States dollars, would reduce financial crime.

== Designs ==
Note	First issued	Last issued	Ceased to be legal tender	Colour	Size	Design	Additional information
White	1725	1943	16 April 1945	Monochrome (printed on one side only)	211 × 133 mm (may vary)		Denomination discontinued from 1945 until 1981
Series D	20 March 1981	1994	20 September 1996	Predominantly brown	169 × 95 mm	Front: Queen Elizabeth II; Back: Christopher Wren	First £50 note to carry a portrait of a monarch and used a "windowed" security thread (July 1988 onwards)
Series E	20 April 1994	2011	30 April 2014	Multicoloured (predominantly red)	156 × 85 mm	Front: Queen Elizabeth II; Back: John Houblon	Foil patch for additional security
Series F	2 November 2011	2021	30 September 2022	Multicoloured (predominantly red)	156 × 85 mm	Front: Queen Elizabeth II; Back: Matthew Boulton and James Watt	
Series G (I)	23 June 2021	2022	Still legal tender	Multicoloured (predominantly red)	146 × 77 mm	Front: Queen Elizabeth II; Back: Alan Turing	Final Series G Polymer issued, Also final note issued to feature Queen Elizabeth II.
Series G (II)	5 June 2024	Still being issued	Still legal tender	Multicoloured (predominantly red)	146 × 77 mm	Front: King Charles III; Back: Alan Turing	First King Charles III notes

Information taken from Bank of England website.

== See also ==
- Bank of England note issues
