= United States ten-thousand-dollar bill =

Denomination of US currency

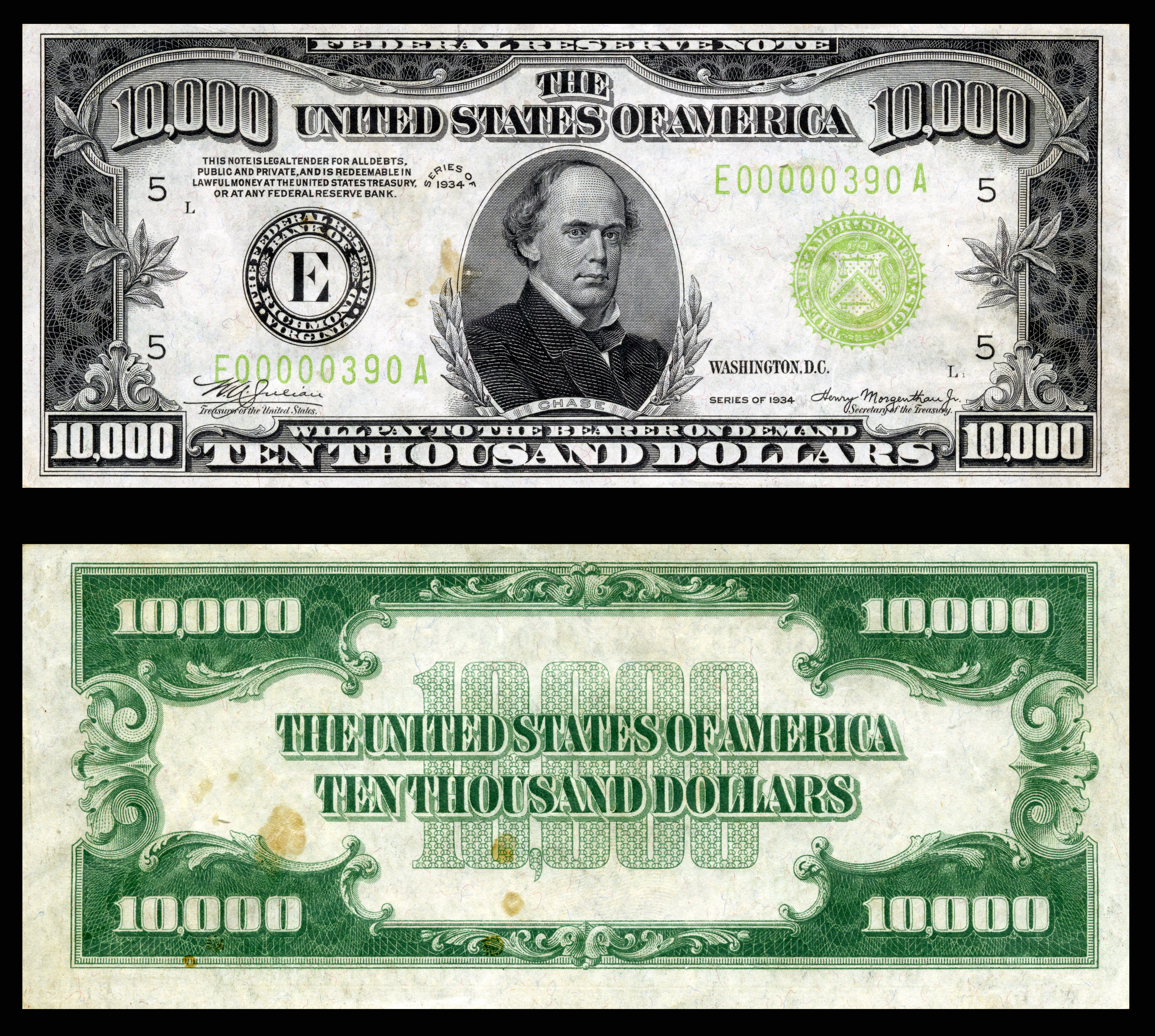
1934 US$10,000 Federal Reserve Note

The United States 10,000-dollar bill (US$10000) is a denomination of the United States dollar. The denomination was first issued in 1878 and the last series were produced in 1934. They were withdrawn from circulation after 1969. The $10,000 note was the highest denomination of US currency to be used by the public. These notes are still legal tender, and thus banks will redeem them for face value. However, their value to collectors is well above their face value.

While $10-thousand-bills were the highest denomination used by the public, a higher-denomination bill, the $100 thousand bill, was used for inter-bank transfers, did not circulate, and its possession by private holders is illegal.

== Description ==
The first ten-thousand-dollar bills were issued as large-size paper money measuring 7.38 in (187 mm) by 3.18 in (81 mm) and portrayed Andrew Jackson. Beginning with the 1928 series, the size of the bill was reduced to the small-size variety measuring 6.14 in (156 mm) by 2.61 in (66 mm).

The series 1918 version's obverse includes text ("Federal Reserve Note" and "The United States of America will pay to the bearer on demand ten thousand dollars") and a portrait of the former Treasury Secretary Salmon P. Chase. Its reverse features a portrait of the early settlers boarding ships (The Embarkation of the Pilgrims) and the number 10,000 along with the words "Federal Reserve Note".

The simpler reverse of the 1928 and 1934 series featured a decorative border and the text "The United States of America", "Ten Thousand Dollars" and "10,000".

== History ==
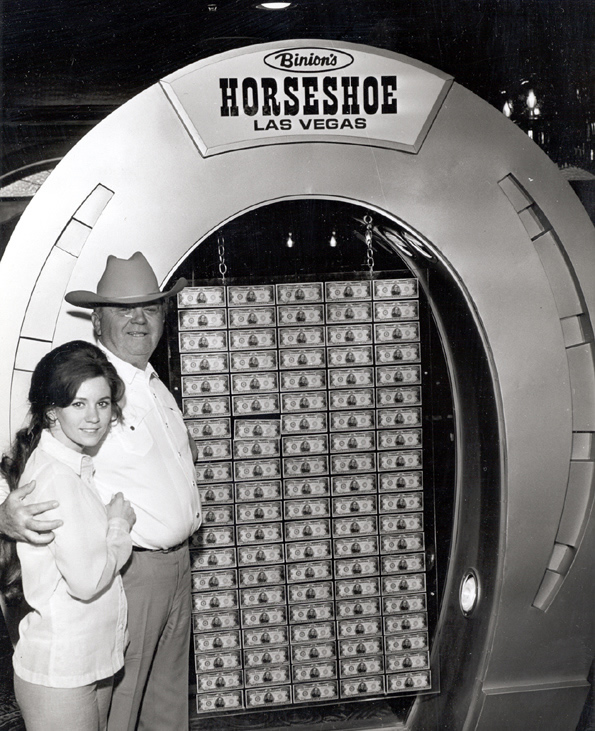
Benny and Becky Binion posing with 100 US$10,000 notes equaling one million dollars

The United States ten-thousand-dollar bill was printed from 1878 to 1934. The $10,000 note first appeared in the Series 1878 legal tender. It was reissued in the series 1914 and 1918 and in the series 1928 and 1934. The 1878 large-size "Horse Blanket" $1 measured 7.38 in (187 mm) by 3.18 in (81 mm), and the 1928 series measured 6.14 in (156 mm) by 2.61 in (66 mm).

The note was originally issued as a gold certificate, but the 1933 Executive Order 6102 limited the ownership of gold currency, so the note was redesigned and reissued as a Federal Reserve Note. The Bureau of Engraving and Printing stopped printing them in 1934 but continued to issue the notes until 1969. The notes did not circulate much among the public because they were printed primarily to facilitate transactions between banks. On July 14, 1969, the United States Department of the Treasury announced that all notes in denominations greater than $100 would be discontinued, and that all banks were required to send them any $10,000 bill for destruction, making the bills increasingly rare.

Collectors have paid $480,000 for individually graded highly valued examples. Having been largely uncirculated outside of banks, many of the bills that still exist remain in pristine condition.

Casino operator Benny Binion displayed one-hundred of the $10,000 bills at his casino, Binion's Gambling Hall and Hotel. The entire collection was bought by Jay Parrino in 1999 for an amount under 10 million dollars. Since then, individual bills from the collection have been sold for up to $188,000 per bill. Before dismantling, the positions and serial numbers of each bill were recorded so that buyers could know where their bill was located in the display.

In 2023, a 1934 uncirculated and Paper Money Guarantee (PMG) company graded $10,000 bill sold for almost $500,000 at Heritage Auctions in Texas.

== See also ==
- Large denominations of United States currency

== Gallery ==
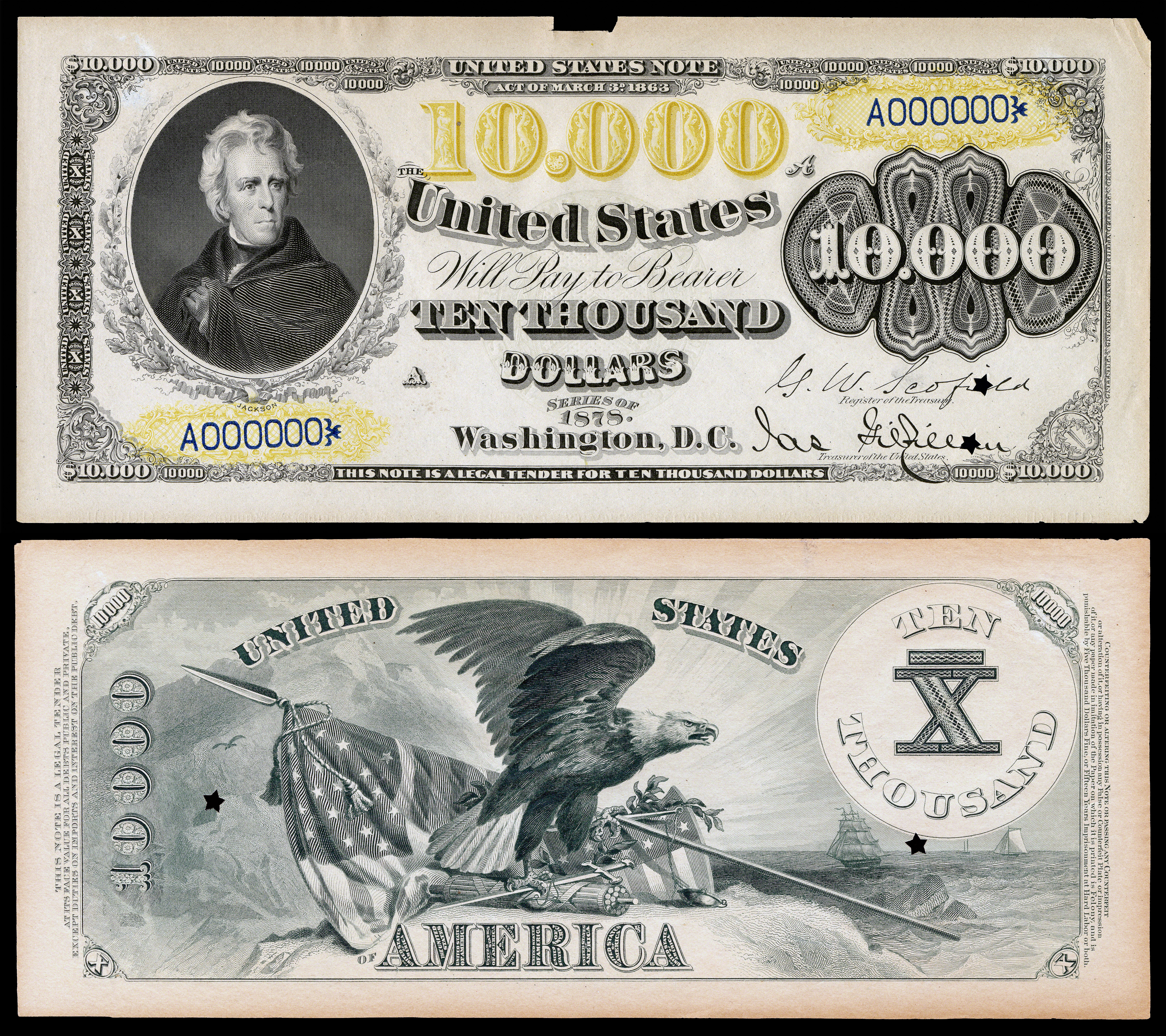
1878 $10,000 gold certificate

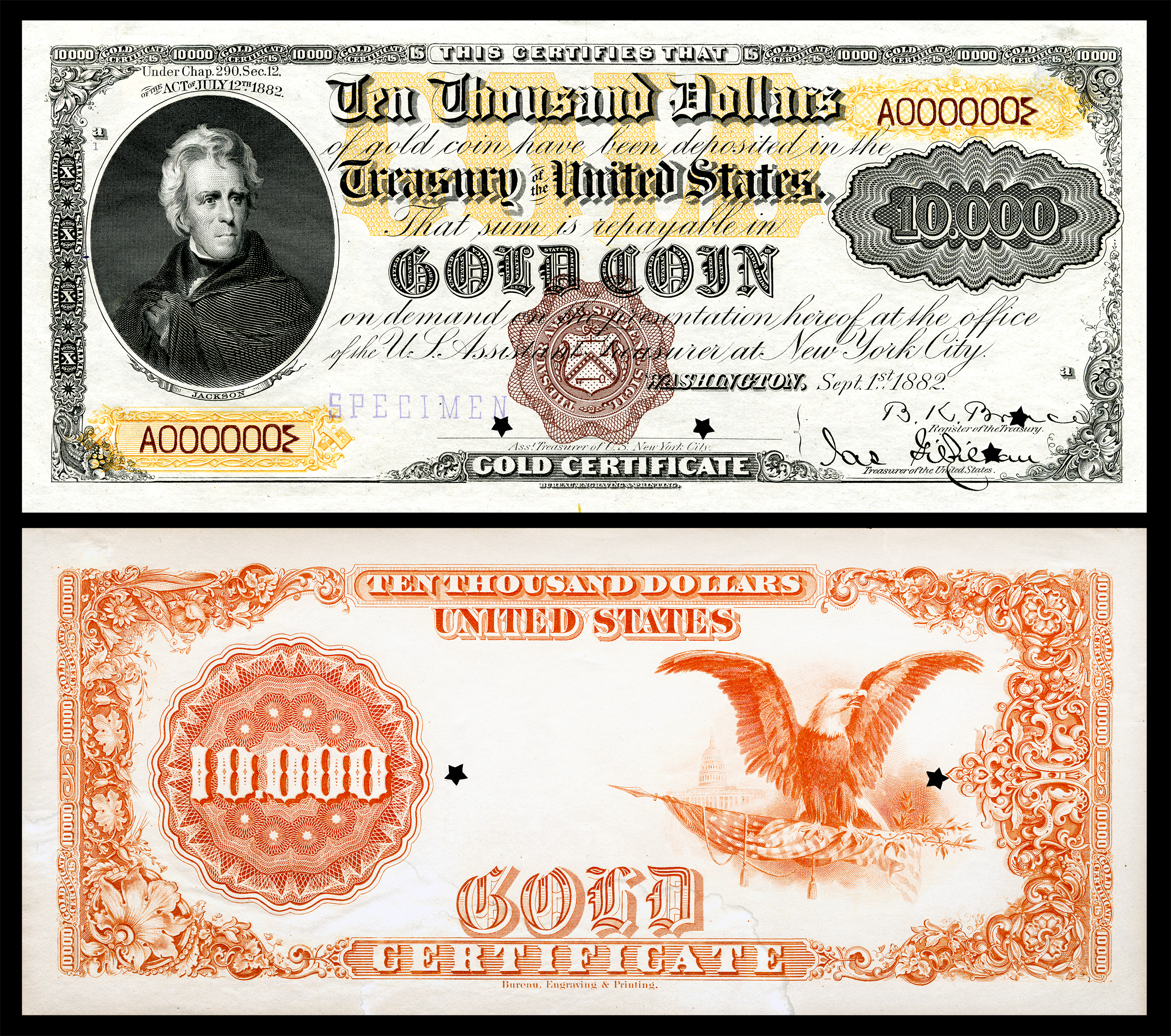
1882 $10,000 gold certificate

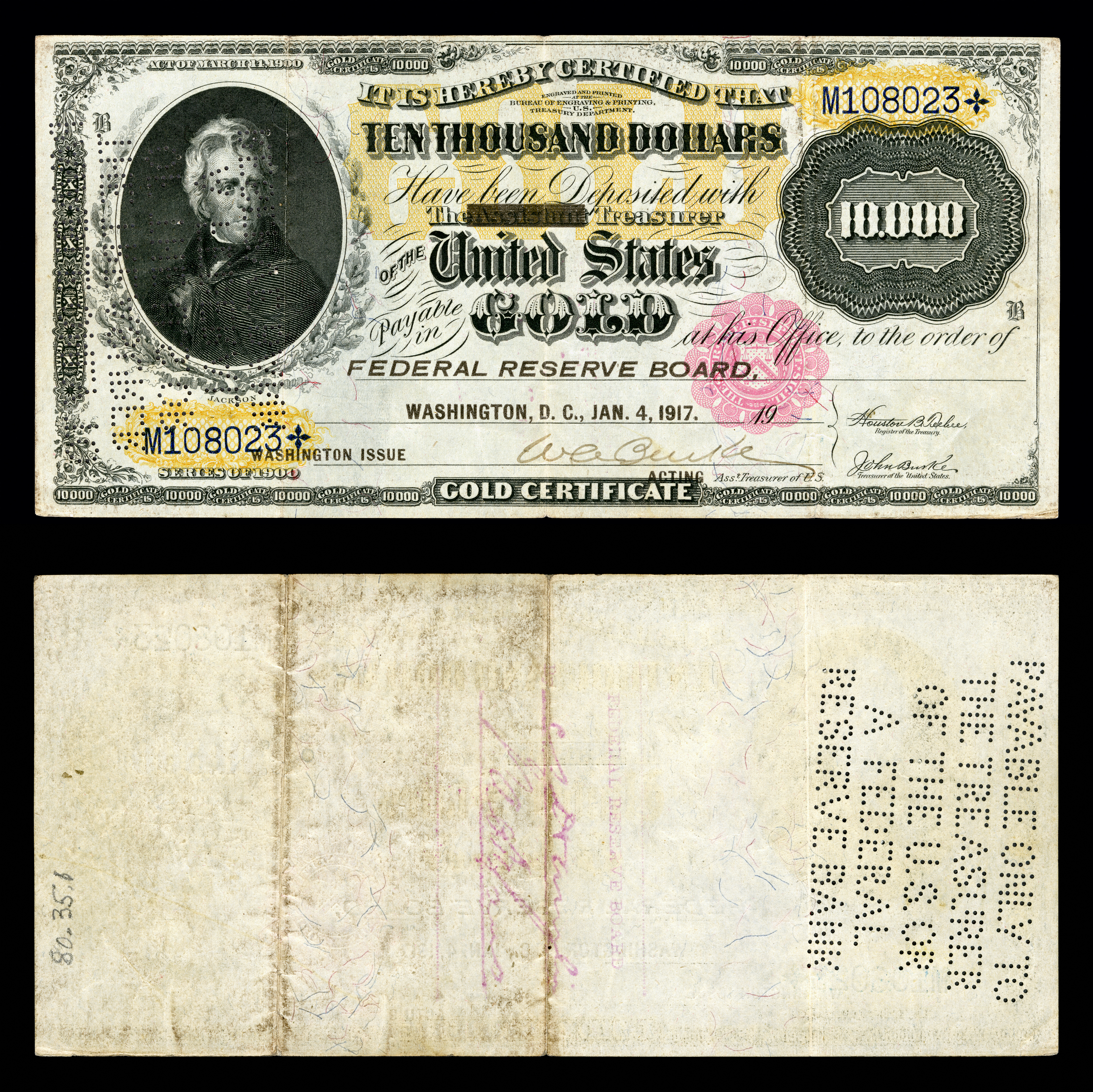
1917 $10,000 gold certificate

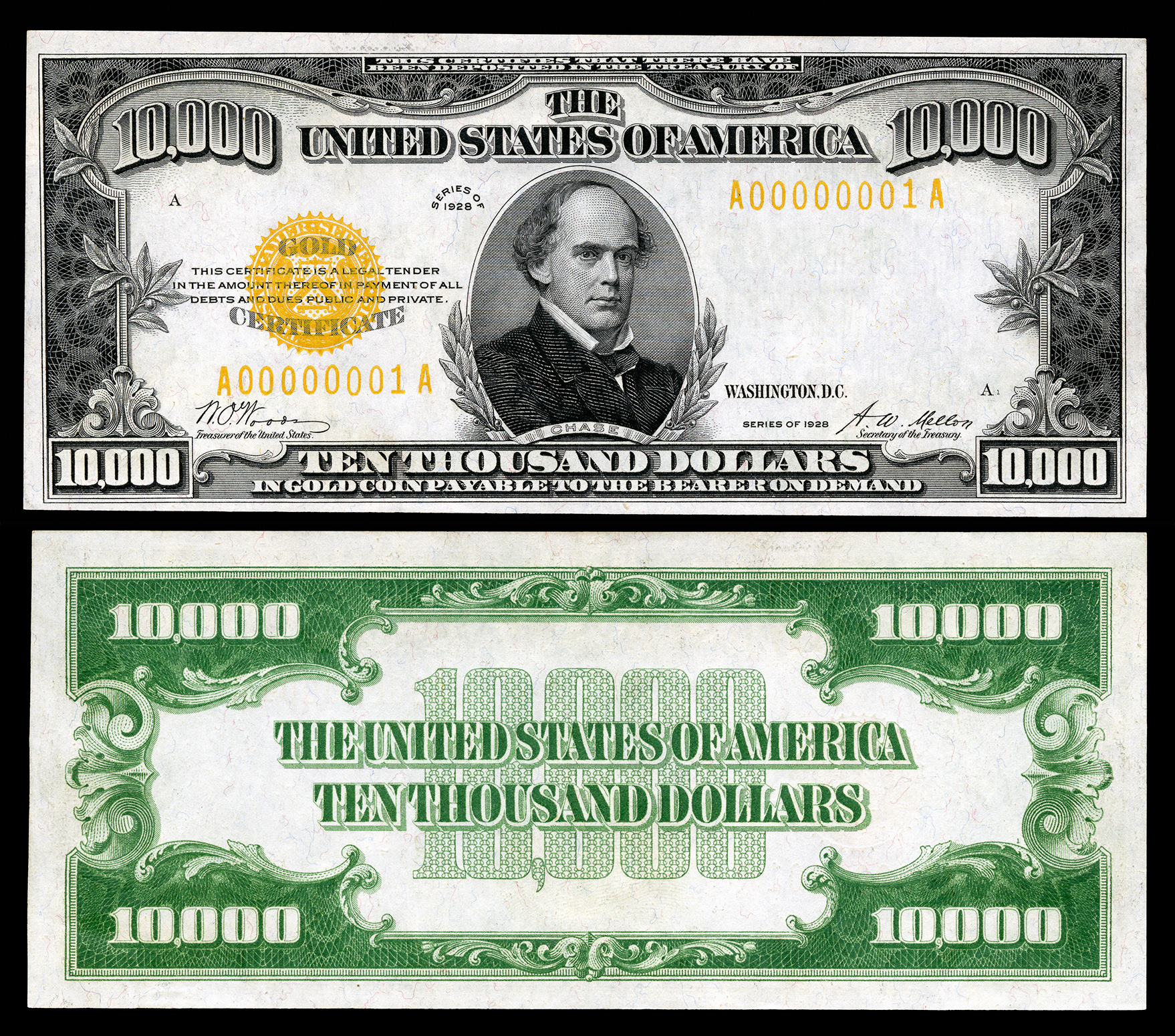
1928 $10,000 gold certificate

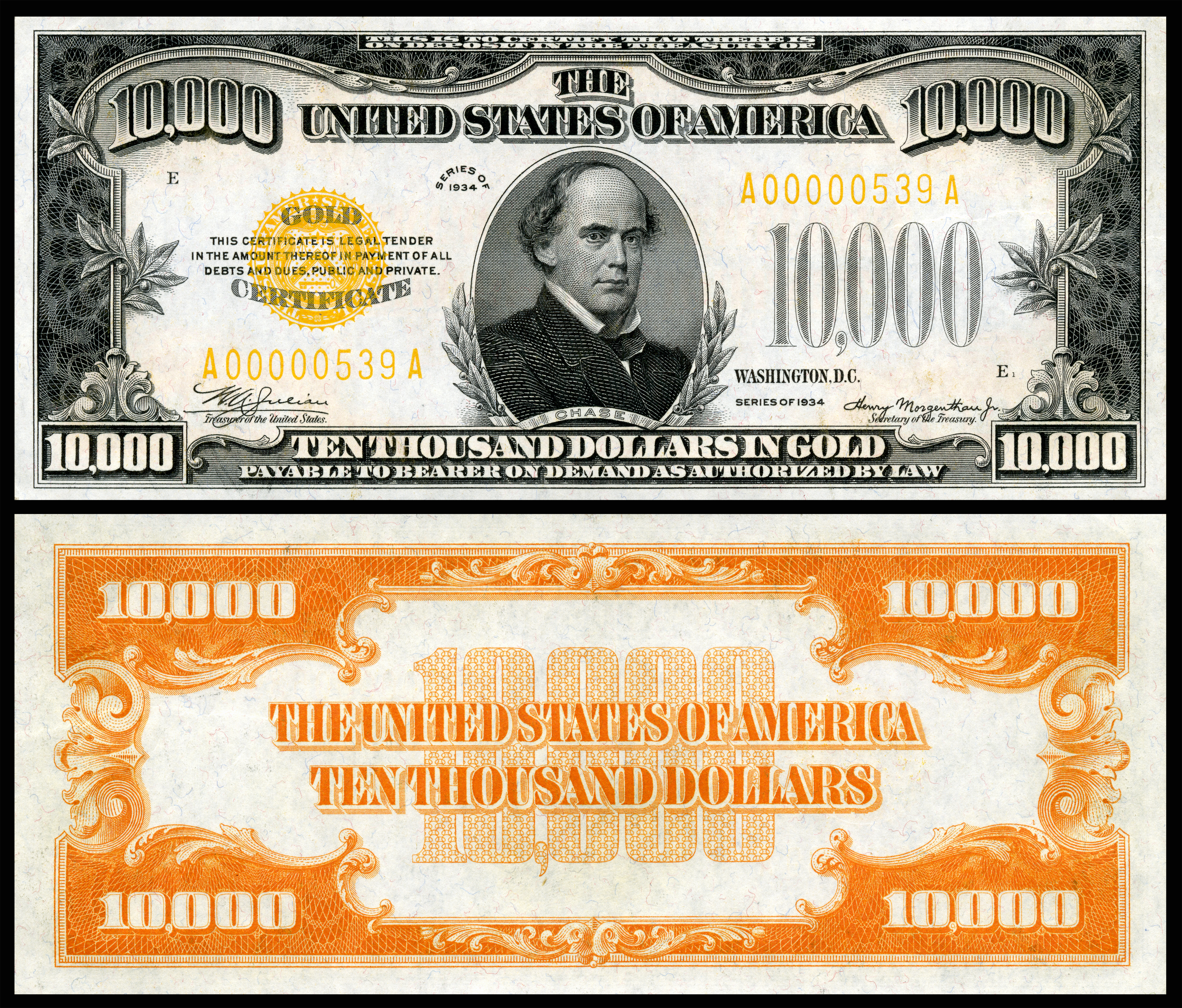
1934 $10,000 gold certificate
