= Large denominations of United States currency =

US currency larger than $100

Large denominations of United States currency greater than $100 were circulated by the United States Treasury until 1969. Since then, U.S. dollar banknotes have been issued in seven denominations: $1, $2, $5, $10, $20, $50, and $100.

== Overview and history ==
Large-denomination currency (i.e., banknotes with a face value of $500 or higher) had been used in the United States since the late 18th century. The first $500 note was issued by North Carolina, authorized by legislation dated May 10, 1780. Virginia quickly followed suit and authorized the printing of $500 and $1,000 notes on October 16, 1780, and $2,000 notes on May 7, 1781. High-denomination treasury notes were issued; for example, during the War of 1812 ($1,000 notes authorized by an act dated June 30, 1812). During the American Civil War, Confederate currency included $500 and $1,000 notes. The earliest (1861) federal banknotes included high-denomination notes such as three-year interest-bearing notes of $500, $1,000, and $5,000, authorized by Congress on July 17, 1861. In total, 11 different types of U.S. currency were issued in high-denomination notes across nearly 20 different series dates. The obverse designs of United States banknotes generally depict either historical figures, allegorical figures symbolizing significant concepts (e.g., liberty, justice), or both. The reverse designs range from abstract scroll-work with ornate denomination identifiers to reproductions of historical art works.

== Public versus institutional use ==
Series 1934 gold certificates ($100; $500; $1,000; $10,000; and $100,000) were issued after the gold standard was repealed, and more than a small amount of personal gold was compulsorily confiscated by order of President Franklin Roosevelt on March 9, 1933 (see United States Executive Order 6102). Thus, the series 1934 notes were used only for intragovernmental (i.e., Federal Reserve Bank) transactions and were not issued to the public. This series was discontinued in 1940. The series 1928 gold certificate reverse was printed in black and green (see History of the United States dollar).

== Passive retirement ==
Although they remain legal tender in the United States, high-denomination bills were last printed on December 27, 1945, and were officially discontinued on July 14, 1969, by the Federal Reserve System because of "lack of use". The lower production $5,000 and $10,000 notes had effectively disappeared well before then. (Note: One hundred $10,000 bills were on display for many years by Benny Binion at Binion's Horseshoe casino in Las Vegas, Nevada, where they were encased in acrylic. The display has since been dismantled and the bills sold to private collectors.)

Beginning in July 1969, the Federal Reserve began removing high-denomination currency from circulation and destroying any large bills returned by banks. As of May 30, 2009, only 336 $10,000 bills were known to exist, along with 342 $5,000 bills, 165,372 $1,000 bills and fewer than 75,000 $500 bills (of over 900,000 printed). Due to their rarity, collectors pay considerably more than the face value of the bills to acquire them, and some are in museums.

These larger denomination bills were mainly used by banks and the federal government for large financial transactions, which was especially true for gold certificates from 1865 to 1934. The introduction of electronic money systems has made large-scale cash transactions mostly obsolete. Concerns about counterfeiting and the use of cash for unlawful activities such as drug trafficking and money laundering have also caused the U.S. government not to reissue any large-denomination currency.

According to the U.S. Department of Treasury website, "The present denominations of our currency in production are $1, $2, $5, $10, $20, $50 and $100. The purpose of the United States currency system is to serve the needs of the public and these denominations meet that goal. Neither the Department of the Treasury nor the Federal Reserve System has any plans to change the denominations in use today."

== Recent proposals ==
In June 2024, Representative Paul Gosar introduced a bill into congress to force the Federal Reserve to restart issuance of $500 bills and adopt a new design that would feature then former President Donald Trump in its portrait. Subsequently, in 2025 a bill was introduced in Congress to issue a $250 note, also with Trump's portrait.

== High-denomination banknote issuing data ==
Key to high denomination banknote type abbreviations (Note: The following types of United States banknotes were not issued in high denominations and are not included in the list below: Demand notes, Federal Reserve bank notes (large or small size), legal tender (small size), silver certificates (small size), National Bank Notes (small size) The table sections are sorted by their appearance in the Friedberg reference book.)
Abbr	Type	Size (Note: Large size notes represent the earlier types or series of U.S. banknotes. Their "average" dimension is 7 3/8 × 3 1/8 inches (187 × 79 mm). Small size notes (described as such due to their size relative to the earlier large size notes) are an "average" 6 1/8 × 2 5/8 (156 × 67 mm), the size of modern U.S. currency. "Each measurement is ± 0.08 inches (2 mm) to account for margins and cutting". Exceptions to the large versus small categories are the CITN, IBN, and RC, all slightly larger than the large size note dimensions.)	Series dates	High denomination series date					Comments
Abbr	Type	Size	Series dates	$500	$1,000	$5,000	$10,000	$100,000	Comments
LT	Legal tender	Large	1862–1923	1862; 1863; 1869; 1874; 1875; 1878; 1880	1862; 1863; 1869; 1878; 1880	1878	1878	–	(Note: All Series 1878 $5,000 and $10,000 notes have been redeemed.)
CITN	Compound interest treasury note	Exception	1863–1864	1863; 1864	1864	–	–	–	
IBN	Interest bearing note	Exception	1861–1865	1861; 1863; 1864; 1865	1861; 1863; 1864; 1865	1861; 1863; 1864; 1865	–	–	(Note: Issued HD IBNs are virtually unknown. There may be one $500 and 2–3 $1,000 known from all issue dates.)
SC	Silver certificate	Large	1878–1923	1878; 1880	1878; 1880; 1891	–	–	–	
TN	Treasury note	Large	1890–1891	1891 (Note: A $500 Series 1891 Treasury Note was authorized and a certified proof was prepared, but the note was never issued.)	1890; 1891	–	–	–	
NBN	National bank note	Large	1865–1875	1865; 1875	1865; 1875	–	–	–	
FRN	Federal reserve note	Large	1914–1918	1918	1918	1918	1918	–	
NGBN	National gold bank note	Large	1870–1883	1870 (Note: Three banks issued $500 NBGN. None are reported, only four notes have not been redeemed.)	– (Note: The Kidder National Gold Bank of Boston received two-note $500–$1,000 sheets from the Treasury. The bank returned the shipment intact.)	–	–	–	(Note: No issued notes or proofs exist of either $500 or $1,000 NGBN)
GC	Gold certificate	Large (Note: Despite the authorizing act date of 3 March 1863, Gold certificates were not issued until 1865.)	1865–1922	1865; 1870; 1875; 1882; 1922	1865; 1870; 1875; 1882; 1907; 1922	1865; 1870; 1882; 1888	1865; 1870; 1875; 1882; 1888; 1900	–	
FRN	Federal reserve note	Small	1928–present	1928; 1934	1928; 1934	1928; 1934	1928; 1934	–	
GC	Gold certificate	Small	1928–1934 (Note: Series 1934 Gold certificates were never intended for public circulation.)	1928	1928; 1934	1928	1928; 1934	1934	

== Table of banknotes ==
The National Numismatic Collection at the Smithsonian Institution contains the Bureau of Engraving and Printing (BEP) certified proofs and the Treasury Department collection of United States currency. Using a combination of proofs and issued notes, a nearly complete type set of high-denomination currency was compiled. Notably missing are several types of Compound and Interest Bearing Notes. Printed during the early to mid-1860s on very thin paper, these high-denomination notes are virtually non-existent. Their issuance (1861–65) predates the BEP's responsibility for U.S. currency (1870s), so very few proofs exist in the current archives.

High denomination United States banknotes (Note: The table is sorted by denomination and then by Friedberg number.)
Value	Type	Series	Friedberg number	Image	Portrait/engraving (Note: When the information is available, the engraver's name has been added in parentheses. Column sorting is based on the individual depicted in the portrait.)	Comments (Note: Variety is the Friedberg number, or specific combination of signatures and seal type; type represents all the varieties that exist for a given denomination and design, it is the total number of note known for the entire design type.)
$500	LT	1862–1863	Fr.183c	$500 Legal Tender note, Series 1862–63, Fr.183c, depicting Albert Gallatin.	Albert Gallatin	4 known (variety); 7 known (type)
$500	LT	1869	Fr.184	$500 Legal Tender note, Series 1869, Fr.184, depicting John Quincy Adams.	John Quincy Adams (Charles Burt); Justice (Stephen A. Schoff)	4 known (only one privately)
$500	LT	1874–1878	Fr.185b	$500 Legal Tender note, Series 1874–78, Fr.185b, depicting Joseph Mansfield.	Joseph Mansfield (Charles Burt); Victory (Charles Burt)	
$500	LT	1880	Fr.185l	$500 Legal Tender note, Series 1880, Fr.185l, depicting Joseph Mansfield.	Joseph Mansfield (Charles Burt); Victory (Charles Burt)	5 known (variety) (Note: Of the 5 known notes, 4 are in institutional collections.)
$500	CITN	1864	Fr.194a; Proof	$500 Compound Interest Treasury Note, Series 1864, Fr.194a, depicting a soldier and a ship.	Standard Bearer (left) (George D. Baldwin); New Ironsides (right) (James Smillie)	Unknown
$500	SC	1878	Fr.345a	$500 Silver Certificate, Series 1878, Fr.345a, depicting Charles Sumner	Charles Sumner (Charles Burt)	Unique (variety and type)
$500	SC	1880	Fr.345c	$500 Silver Certificate, Series 1880, Fr.345c, depicting Charles Sumner	Charles Sumner (Charles Burt)	5 known (variety); 7 known (type)
$500	TN	1891	Fr.379; Proof	$500 Treasury note (1890–91) proof, Series 1891, unreported Friedberg number, depicting William Tecumseh Sherman.	William Tecumseh Sherman	None issued
$500	NBN	1865–1875	Fr.464	$500 National Bank Note, Original Series, Fr.464, vignette depicting Civilization; Sirius arriving in New York (obv); Surrender of General Burgoyne (rev).	Civilization (left) (James D. Smillie); Sirius arriving in New York (right); Surrender of General Burgoyne (rev) (Frederick Girsch)	2 known (variety); 3 known (type)
$500	FRN	1918	Fr.1132d	$500 Federal Reserve Note, Series 1918, Fr.1132d, depicting John Marshal.	John Marshall (Charles Schlecht) de Soto discovering the Mississippi (rev) (Frederick Girsch)	
$500	GC	1863	Fr.1166d; Proof	$500 Gold Certificate, Series 1865, Fr.1166d, with a vignette of an eagle and shield (left).	Eagle with shield or E Pluribus Unum (Charles Skinner)	Unknown
$500	GC	1870–1875	Fr.1166i	$500 Gold Certificate, Series 1870, Fr.1166i, depicting Abraham Lincoln	Abraham Lincoln (Charles Burt)	Unique
$500	GC	1882–1922	Fr.1216a	$500 Gold Certificate, Series 1882, Fr.1216a, depicting Abraham Lincoln	Abraham Lincoln (Charles Burt)	
$500	FRN	1928–1934	Fr.2200g	$500 Federal Reserve Note, Series 1928, Fr.2200g, depicting William McKinley.	William McKinley (John Eissler)	
$500	GC	1928	Fr.2407	$500 Gold Certificate, Series 1928, Fr.2407, depicting William McKinley.	William McKinley (John Eissler)	
$1,000	LT	1862–1863	Fr.186e	$1,000 Legal Tender note, Series 1862–63, Fr.186e, depicting Robert Morris.	Robert Morris (Charles Schlecht)	Unique (variety); 5 known (type)
$1,000	LT	1869	Fr.186f; Proof		DeWitt Clinton	2 known
$1,000	LT	1878	Fr.187a	$1,000 Legal Tender note, Series 1878, Fr.187a, depicting DeWitt Clinton.	DeWitt Clinton; Columbus in his study (Henry Gugler)	
$1,000	LT	1880	Fr.187k	$1,000 Legal Tender note, Series 1880, Fr.187k, depicting DeWitt Clinton.	DeWitt Clinton; Columbus in his study (Henry Gugler)	4 known (variety); ~20–25 known (type) (Note: Of the 4 known notes, 2 are in institutional collections.)
$1,000	IBN	1863	Fr.201; Proof	$1,000 Interest Bearing Note, Series 1863, Fr.201, depicting vignettes of Justice and Liberty.	Justice (left); Liberty (right)	Unknown
$1,000	IBN	1863	Fr.206; Proof	$1,000 Interest Bearing Note, Series 1863, Fr.206, depicting ships at battle and conquistadors.	Guerriere and the Constitution (left) and Discovery of the Mississippi by De Soto (right)	Unknown
$1,000	SC	1878	Fr.346a; Proof	$1000 Silver Certificate, Series 1878, Fr.346a, depicting William Marcy	William Marcy (Charles Schlecht)	Unknown
$1,000	SC	1880	Fr.346d	$1000 Silver Certificate, Series 1880, Fr.346d, depicting William Marcy	William Marcy (Charles Schlecht)	5 known (variety); 5 known (type)
$1,000	SC	1891	Fr.346e	$1000 Silver Certificate, Series 1891, Fr.346e, depicting William Marcy	William Marcy (Charles Schlecht); Liberty (Charles Burt)	2 known
$1,000	TN	1890	Fr.379a	$1,000 Treasury note (1890–91), Series 1890, Fr.379a, depicting George Meade.	George Meade (Charles Burt)	5 known (variety); 7 known (type)
$1,000	TN	1891	Fr.379c	$1,000 Treasury note (1890–91), Series 1891, Fr.379c, depicting George Meade.	George Meade (Charles Burt)	2 known (variety); 3 known (type)
$1,000	NBN	1865–1875	Fr.465; Proof	$1,000 National Bank Note proof, Series 1875, Fr.465, vignette depicting (obv) Scott's entrance into Mexico City (rev) Washington surrendering his commission.	Scott entering City of Mexico (left) (Alfred Jones); United States Capitol (right) (James Smillie); Washington resigning his commission (rev) (Frederick Girsch)	Unknown
$1,000	FRN	1918	Fr.1133d	$1,000 Federal Reserve Note, Series 1918, Fr.1133d, depicting Alexander Hamilton.	Alexander Hamilton (G.F.C. Smillie); Eagle (rev) (Marcus W. Baldwin)	
$1,000	GC	1863	Fr.1166e; Proof	$1,000 Gold Certificate, Series 1865, Fr.1166e, with a vignette of an eagle and shield (left) and justice (bottom center).	Eagle with shield or E Pluribus Unum (Charles Skinner); Justice with scales	Unique
$1,000	GC	1870–1875	Fr.1166o; Proof	$1,000 Gold Certificate proof, Series 1875, Fr.1166j, depicting Alexander Hamilton	Alexander Hamilton (Charles Burt)	Unique
$1,000	GC	1882	Fr.1218g	$1,000 Gold Certificate, Series 1882, Fr.1218g, depicting Alexander Hamilton	Alexander Hamilton (G.F.C. Smillie)	
$1,000	GC	1907–1922	Fr.1219	$1,000 Gold Certificate, Series 1907, Fr.1219, depicting Alexander Hamilton	Alexander Hamilton	
$1,000	FRN	1928–1934	Fr.2210g	$1,000 Federal Reserve Note, Series 1928, Fr.2210g, depicting Grover Cleveland.	Grover Cleveland (John Eissler)	
$1,000	GC	1928	Fr.2408	$1,000 Gold Certificate, Series 1928, Fr.2408, depicting Grover Cleveland.	Grover Cleveland (John Eissler)	
$1,000	GC	1934	Fr.2409	$1,000 Gold Certificate, Series 1934, Fr.2409, depicting Grover Cleveland.	Grover Cleveland (John Eissler)	
$5,000	LT	1878	Fr.188; Proof	$5,000 Legal Tender note proof, Series 1878, Fr.188, depicting James Madison.	James Madison (Alfred Sealey); Eagle (William Chorlton)	All notes have been redeemed, none outstanding
$5,000	IBN	1863	Fr.202; Proof	$5,000 Interest Bearing Note proof, Series 1863, Fr.202, with vignette Altar of Liberty.	The Altar of Liberty (Louis Delnoce)	Unknown
$5,000	IBN	1865	Fr.212h; Proof	$5,000 Interest Bearing Note proof, Series 1865, Fr.212h, vignettes depicting justice (left) and the ship New Ironsides (center).	Justice (left); New Ironsides (center) (James Smillie)	
$5,000	FRN	1918	Fr.1134d	$5,000 Federal Reserve Note, Series 1918, Fr.1134d, depicting James Madison.	James Madison (Alfred Sealey); Washington resigning his commission (rev) (Louis Delnoce)	Unique (variety); 5 known (type) (Note: None exist outside of institutional collections.)
$5,000	GC	1863	Fr.1166f; Proof	$5,000 Gold Certificate, Series 1865, Fr.1166f, with a vignette of an eagle and shield (left) and justice (bottom center).	Eagle with shield or E Pluribus Unum (Charles Skinner); Female	Unique
$5,000	GC	1870–1875	Fr.1166k; Proof	$5,000 Gold Certificate proof, Series 1870, Fr.1166k, depicting James Madison	James Madison (Alfred Sealey)	Unknown
$5,000	GC	1882	Fr.1221a; Proof	$5,000 Gold Certificate, Series 1882, Fr.1221a, depicting James Madison	James Madison (Alfred Sealey)	Two known
$5,000	FRN	1928–1934	Fr.2220g	$5,000 Federal Reserve Note, Series 1928, Fr.2220g, depicting James Madison.	James Madison (Alfred Sealey)	
$5,000	GC	1928	Fr.2410	$5,000 Gold Certificate, Series 1928, Fr.2410, depicting James Madison.	James Madison	
$10,000	LT	1878	Fr.189; Proof	$10,000 Legal Tender note proof, Series 1878, Fr.189, depicting Anderw Jackson.	Andrew Jackson (Alfred Sealey)	All notes have been redeemed, none outstanding
$10,000	FRN	1918	Fr.1135d	$10,000 Federal Reserve Note, Series 1918, Fr.1135d, depicting Salmon P. Chase.	Salmon Chase; Embarkation of the Pilgrims (rev)	Unique (variety); 5 known (type) (Note: None exist outside of institutional collections.)
$10,000	GC	1863	Fr.1166g; Proof	$10,000 Gold Certificate, Series 1865, Fr.1166g, with a vignette of an eagle and shield (left) and justice (bottom center).	Eagle with shield or E Pluribus Unum (Charles Skinner)	Unknown
$10,000	GC	1870–1875	Fr.1166l; Proof	$10,000 Gold Certificate proof, Series 1875, Fr.1166l, depicting Andrew Jackson	Andrew Jackson	Unique
$10,000	GC	1882	Fr.1223a; Proof	$10,000 Gold Certificate, Series 1882, Fr.1223a, depicting Andrew Jackson	Andrew Jackson (Alfred Sealey)	Two known
$10,000	GC	1900	Fr.1225	$10,000 Gold Certificate, Series 1900, Fr.1225, depicting Andrew Jackson	Andrew Jackson (Alfred Sealey)	
$10,000	FRN	1928–1934	Fr.2230b	$10,000 Federal Reserve Note, Series 1928, Fr.2230b, depicting Salmon P. Chase.	Salmon P. Chase	
$10,000	GC	1928	Fr.2411	$10,000 Gold Certificate, Series 1928, Fr.2411, depicting Salmon P. Chase.	Salmon P. Chase	
$10,000	GC	1934	Fr.2412	$10,000 Gold Certificate, Series 1934, Fr.2412, depicting Salmon P. Chase.	Salmon P. Chase	
$100,000	GC	1934	Fr.2413	$100,000 Gold Certificate, Series 1934, Fr.2413, depicting Woodrow Wilson.	Woodrow Wilson (G.F.C. Smillie); Reverse (Frederick Pauling)	Was never in circulation; cannot legally be privately held other than uniface specimen examples

== See also ==
- Promotional fake United States currency
- Silver standard
- Trillion-dollar coin
