= Bank of England £100,000,000 note =

Non-circulating Bank of England banknote

One hundred million pounds
- Country: United Kingdom
- Value: £100,000,000 sterling
- Width: 297 mm
- Height: 210 mm
- Security features: Requires the signature of the incumbent Chief Cashier of the Bank of England

Obverse
- Design: Britannia

Reverse
- Design: Blank

The Bank of England £100,000,000 banknote, also referred to as Titan, is a non-circulating Bank of England sterling banknote used to back the value of Scottish and Northern Irish banknotes. It has the same dimensions as an A4 sheet of paper. It is the highest denomination of banknote printed by the Bank of England. As both Scotland and Northern Ireland have banknotes issued by particular local banks, the non-circulating notes provide the essential link between those banknotes and the currency of England and Wales, and security if a local issuing bank were to fail.

== Purpose ==
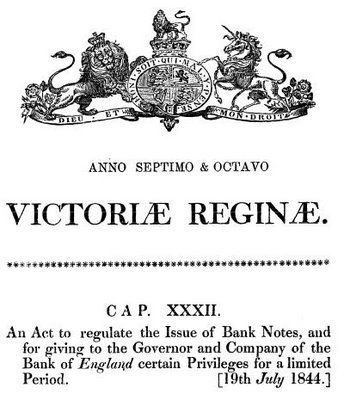
The Bank Charter Act 1844 meant that only the Bank of England could issue notes – excluding Scottish banks. (Note: The tradition of printing banknotes was considered the norm centuries ago as most of the UK’s banks (commercial banks excluding the Bank of England) produced their own banknotes. The Bank Charter Act 1844 in the United Kingdom moved all production of banknotes to The Bank of England, except for Scotland, which argued for an exception. The Currency and Bank Notes Act 1928 allowed banks in Northern Ireland to issue their own notes as well.)

The £100 million note (nicknamed "Titan" simply because of its titanic value) backs the value of common circulating notes (£1, £5, £10, £20, £50, and £100 notes) issued by the six commercial banks in Scotland (Bank of Scotland, Royal Bank of Scotland, Clydesdale Bank) and Northern Ireland (Bank of Ireland, Danske Bank and Ulster Bank). The million pound note plays a similar vital role in the British currency system. Scottish and Northern Irish banknotes are often viewed with suspicion by businesses in England and Wales as businesses are not always familiar with the different types of notes that are issued and may not be sure on how to check them for counterfeiting and, therefore, do not like to accept them. The backing by the £100 million notes and the £1 million notes is intended to maintain public confidence in the value the notes represent. For every pound an authorised Scottish or Northern Irish commercial bank prints and issues in the form of its own notes, it must deposit the equivalent in pound sterling with the Bank of England. If necessary, notes from a struggling Scottish or Northern Irish commercial bank could be replaced with regular Bank of England issued cash. (Note: "If there was an unfortunate situation when one of the banks failed, note holders would have the confidence that their notes were still valued as it said on them," says Victoria Cleland, the Executive Director for Banking, Payments, and Innovation, and the Chief Cashier at the Bank of England.)

The Bank of England prints £100 million notes internally, rather than at its normal commercial printers, for security reasons. The £100 million notes are then locked away together with other backing assets either within the Bank of England vault, or in other authorised locations, to further ensure their security as physical assets. For even further security, £100 million notes must be signed by the existing Chief Cashier in order to become legal tender and actually be used as a backing asset for commercial banks and their notes in Scotland and Northern Ireland.

== See also ==
- Bank of England £1,000,000 note
- Bank of England £10,000,000 note
- Bank of England note issues
- Gold certificate
- United States one hundred-thousand-dollar bill
