= Bank of England 10 shilling note =

Obsolete denomination of British currency

Ten shillings
- Country: United Kingdom
- Value: 10/– (1/2 pound; 50 new pence)
- Width: 140 mm
- Height: 67 mm
- Material used: Cotton
- Years of printing: 1928–1969

Obverse
- Design: Queen Elizabeth II
- Design date: 12 October 1961

Reverse
- Design: Bank of England logo
- Design date: 12 October 1961

The Bank of England 10 shilling note (notation: 10/– or 10s; equivalent to 50 new pence or 50p), colloquially known as the 10 bob note, was a sterling banknote worth half of one pound. The ten-shilling note was the smallest denomination note ever issued by the Bank of England. The note was issued by the Bank of England for the first time in 1928 and continued to be printed until 1969. The note was demonetised in 1970 and was discontinued in favour of the fifty pence coin due to inflation and decimalisation.

== History ==
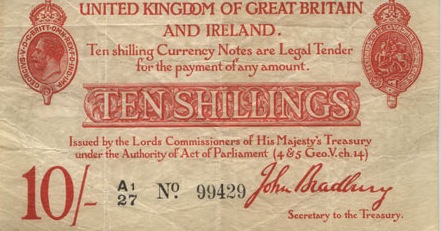
Obverse side of the 10/– banknote issued by HM Treasury

In the 18th and 19th centuries, banknotes were handwritten or part-printed and could be exchanged, in whole or in part, for an equivalent amount of gold when presented at the bank. During the First World War the British Government wanted to maintain its stocks of bullion and so banks were ordered to stop exchanging banknotes for gold. £1 and 10/– notes were introduced by the Treasury in lieu of gold sovereigns. These notes were nicknamed "Bradburys" because of the prominent signature of Sir John Bradbury, Permanent Secretary to the Treasury displayed on the notes. Britain returned to the gold standard in 1925, but the Bank of England was only obliged to exchange notes for gold in multiples of 400 ounces or more. The responsibility for the printing of 10/– notes was transferred to the Bank of England in 1928, and the right to redeem banknotes for gold ceased in 1931 when Britain stopped using the gold standard.

The first Bank of England 10/– notes were two-sided, red, printed banknotes featuring the declaration "I promise to pay the bearer on demand the sum of ten shillings" on the front. This declaration remains on Bank of England banknotes to this day. In 1939, early in the Second World War, UK ambassador to Greece Michael Palairet was notified about the secret German plans to forge sterling notes, and in 1940 10/– notes were issued in a new mauve and grey colour scheme in order to frustrate counterfeiters, although the design remained the same. At the same time, a metallic thread running through the paper was introduced as a security feature. After the war 10/– notes were again issued in their original red colour. The earliest post-World War II notes did not have the metallic thread security feature, but those issued from October 1948 onward did.

The ten-shilling note was nicknamed a "half-note," especially in Scotland and Ireland.

A new design for 10/– notes was introduced in 1961, with the old notes ceasing to be legal tender in 1962. These new series C notes were slightly longer and narrower, and were the first 10/– notes with a portrait of Queen Elizabeth II on the front. The reverse design incorporated the logo of the Bank of England. In the late 1960s it was decided that future banknotes should feature a British historical figure on the reverse. The first such note was the series D £20 note, first issued in 1970, featuring William Shakespeare. A design for a 10/– note featuring Walter Raleigh on the reverse was approved in 1964, but this was never issued. It was initially intended that the Walter Raleigh note would be issued as a 50 pence note, but due to spiralling inflation the note's lifespan had declined to about 5 months in circulation and instead it was replaced by a coin. The series C 10/– notes ceased to be legal tender on 22 November 1970. In the Isle of Man, both the English and Manx 10/– notes continued to be legal tender for 50 pence until 2013.

== Details ==
Image	Note	First Issued	Last Issued	Ceased to be legal tender	Colour	Size	Front	Back	Additional information
	Series A (1st issue)	22 November 1928	Unknown	29 October 1962	Red-brown	138 × 78 mm			
	Emergency wartime issue	2 April 1940	Unknown	22 October 1962	Mauve and grey	138 × 78 mm			Incorporated metal thread for the first time; same design as series A
	Series A (2nd issue)	17 June 1948	Unknown	29 October 1962	Brown	138 × 78 mm			Reissue of unthreaded pre-war notes
	Series A (3rd issue)	25 October 1948	Unknown	29 October 1962	Brown	138 × 78 mm			Metal thread introduced permanently
	Series C	12 October 1961	13 October 1969	22 November 1970	Red-brown	140 × 67 mm	Queen Elizabeth II	Bank of England logo	First 10/- note to carry portrait of monarch
	Series D	—N/a			Red-brown	121 × 62 mm	Queen Elizabeth II	Sir Walter Raleigh	Intended as 50p note following decimalisation; never issued

Information taken from Bank of England website.

== See also ==
- Bank of England note issues

Preceded by Half Pound	Ten shilling note 1928–1969	Succeeded by Fifty pence coin
