= Bank of England £1 note =

Obsolete denomination of British currency

One pound
- Country: United Kingdom
- Value: £1 sterling
- Width: 135 mm
- Height: 67 mm
- Material used: Cotton
- Years of printing: 1797–1984

Obverse
- Design: Queen Elizabeth II
- Design date: 9 February 1978

Reverse
- Design: Isaac Newton
- Design date: 9 February 1978

The Bank of England £1 note was a sterling banknote. After the ten shilling note was withdrawn in 1970, it became the smallest denomination note issued by the Bank of England. The one pound note was issued by the Bank of England for the first time in 1797 and continued to be printed until 1984. The note was withdrawn in 1988 due to inflation and was replaced by a coin.

== History ==
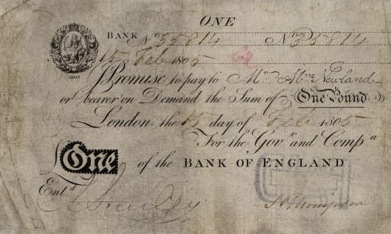
£1 note, issued from London in 1805

One pound notes were introduced by the Bank of England in 1797, following gold shortages caused by the French Revolutionary Wars. The earliest notes were handwritten, and were issued as needed to individuals. These notes were written on one side only and included the name of the payee, the date, and the signature of the issuing cashier. Between 1797 and 1821 the lack of bullion meant that banks would not exchange banknotes for gold, but after the end of the Napoleonic Wars the shortage was alleviated such that notes could be exchanged for an equivalent amount of gold when presented at the bank. One pound notes ceased to be issued in 1821 and were replaced by gold sovereigns.

During the First World War the British Government wanted to maintain its stocks of gold and so banks were ordered to again stop exchanging any and all denominations of banknotes for gold. Gold sovereigns were replaced by one pound notes issued by the Treasury. These notes were nicknamed "Johns" because of the prominent signature of Sir John Bradbury, Permanent Secretary to the Treasury displayed on the notes. Britain returned to the gold standard in 1925, although the Bank of England was only obliged to exchange notes for gold in multiples of 400 troy ounces (12,000 g) (the typical size of a "Good Delivery bar") or more. The responsibility for the printing of one pound notes was transferred to the Bank of England in 1928, and the ability to redeem banknotes for gold ceased in 1931 when Britain stopped using the gold standard.

The Bank of England's first post-World War I one pound notes were two-sided green notes which were printed – not handwritten. The name of the payee was replaced by the declaration "I promise to pay the bearer on demand the sum of one pound". This declaration remains on Bank of England banknotes to this day. This signature of the issuing cashier was replaced by the printed signature of the Chief Cashier of the Bank of England. In 1939, following the outbreak of the Second World War, UK ambassador to Greece Michael Palairet was notified about secret Nazi plans to forge British paper money, and in 1940 one pound notes were issued in a new blue-orange colour scheme to deter counterfeiters, although the design remained the same. At the same time, a metal thread running through the paper was introduced as a security feature. After the war, one pound notes were issued in their original green colour. The earliest post-World War II notes did not have the metallic thread security feature, but those issued from September 1948 onward did.

A new design for one pound notes was introduced in 1960, with the old notes ceasing to be legal tender in 1962. These new series C notes were slightly narrower, and were the first one-pound notes to feature a portrait of Queen Elizabeth II on the front. The reverse design incorporated the logo of the Bank of England. Series C notes were replaced by the series D notes from 1978 onward. These slightly smaller notes featured an entirely new design with Queen Elizabeth II on the front and scientist and master of the Royal Mint Isaac Newton on the back. The design was updated in 1981 with brighter background colours. Following a consultation with retailers and other groups it was announced on 31 July 1981 that the one pound note would be replaced by a one pound coin. Inflation had collapsed the note's average circulation lifespan to nine months and the vending industry preferred coins to banknotes. The new nickel brass coin was introduced on 21 April 1983 and the one pound note ceased to be legal tender on 11 March 1988. Bank of England one pound notes are still occasionally found in Scotland, alongside £1 notes from Scottish banks. The Bank of England will exchange old £1 notes for their face value in perpetuity.

== Designs ==
Note	First issued	Last issued	Ceased to be legal tender	Colour	Size	Design / Picture	Additional information
White	2 March 1797	1821/1825–6	Unknown	Monochrome (printed on one side only)	200mm x 113mm (may vary)		
1st Series Treasury Issue	7 August 1914	Unknown	12 June 1920	Black on White (printed on one side only)	127 × 64 mm	Designed at Royal Mint from sketches by Frederick Atterbury. Signed by Sir John Bradbury	
2nd Series Treasury Issue	23 October 1914	Unknown	12 June 1920	Black on White (printed one side only)	149 × 83 mm	George Eve. Printed by LA Rue & Co on banknote paper.	
3rd Series Treasury Issue	22 January 1917	Unknown	1 August 1933	Brown & Green	151 × 84 mm	Front: Britannia; Back: Bank of England	Reissue of unthreaded pre-war notes
Series A (1st issue)	22 November 1928	Unknown	28 May 1962	Green	151 × 85 mm	Front: Britannia; Back: Saint George and the Dragon	
Emergency wartime issue	29 March 1940	Unknown	28 May 1962	Pale blue and orange	151 × 85 mm	Front: Britannia; Back: Saint George and the Dragon	Incorporated metal thread for the first time; same design as series A
Series A (2nd issue)	17 June 1948	Unknown	28 May 1962	Green	151 × 85 mm	Front: Britannia; Back: Saint George and the Dragon	Reissue of unthreaded pre-war notes
Series A (3rd issue)	13 September 1948	Unknown	28 May 1962	Green	151 × 85 mm	Front: Britannia; Back: Saint George and the Dragon	Metal thread introduced permanently
Series C	17 March 1960	1978	31 May 1979	Green	151 × 72 mm	Front: Queen Elizabeth II; Back: Bank of England logo	First £1 note to carry portrait of monarch
Series D	9 February 1978	31 December 1984	11 March 1988	Predominantly green	135 × 67 mm	Front: Queen Elizabeth II; Back: Isaac Newton	Those issued from 20 March 1981 onward featured additional background colours.

Information taken from Bank of England website.

== See also ==
- Bank of England note issues
- The Royal Bank of Scotland £1 note
