= United States one-hundred-thousand-dollar bill =

Former denomination of United States currency

One hundred thousand dollars
- Country: United States
- Value: $100,000
- Width: 157 mm
- Height: 66 mm
- Years of printing: 1934–1935 (commissioned in 1933)
- Estimated value: $2,296,932 (1934 to 2023), $2,246,635 (1935 to 2023)

Obverse
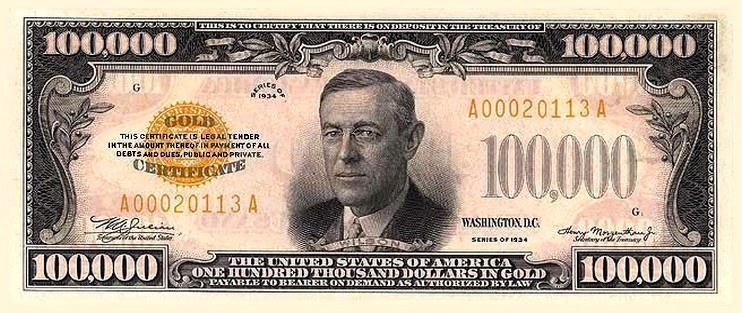
- Design: A vignette portrait of Woodrow Wilson
- Design date: 1934

Reverse
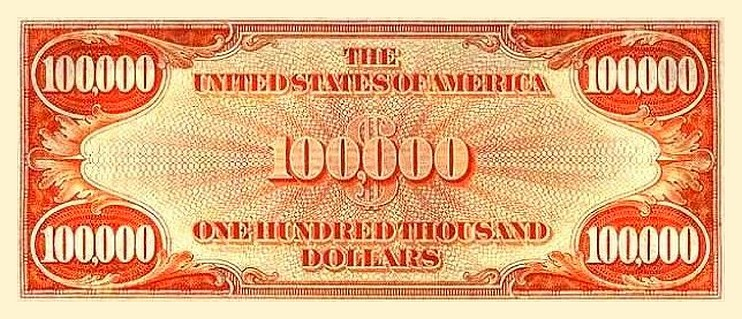
- Design: 100,000 centered in front of a US dollar sign, golden rays radiating out of the center, orange in color.
- Design date: 1934

The United States one-hundred-thousand-dollar bill (US$100,000) is a former denomination of United States currency issued from 1934 to 1935. The bill, which features President Woodrow Wilson, was created as a large denomination note for gold transactions between Federal Reserve Banks; it never circulated publicly.

The $100,000 bill was created by the Bureau of Engraving and Printing under the order of President Franklin D. Roosevelt in response to the hoarding of gold during the Great Depression, believed to be slowing economic regrowth. Executive Order 6102, signed by Roosevelt, was ratified by the United States Congress in 1934. Executive Order 6102 prohibited the hoarding of gold certificates, accompanied also by bullion and coins.

Unlike the other denominations of US dollars, the $100,000 bill was never issued as a Federal Reserve Note (a.k.a. greenback). It was only issued in the form of a gold certificate.

About 42,000 of the $100,000 bills were printed. Many were destroyed in the years following their commission, with the remaining few in possession of the United States federal government. Possession by private individuals of the $100,000 bill is deemed illegal on account of its large denomination and the regulations declared at its signing. The bill, outside of the federal government, may only be used for educational purposes, particularly in museums for public viewing. The Smithsonian Institution along with the Federal Reserve System are known to have $100,000 bills in their ownership.

== Design ==
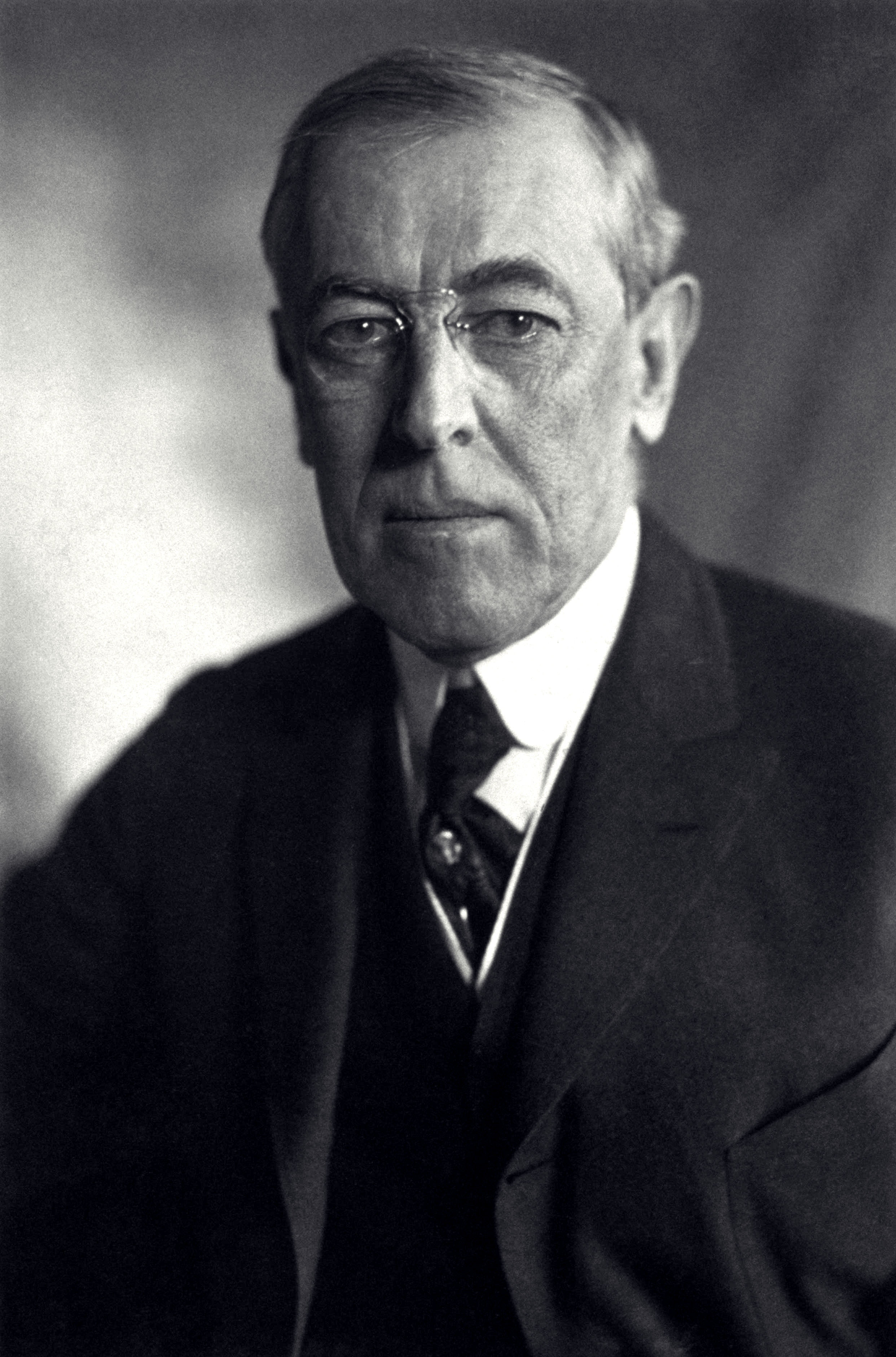
President Woodrow Wilson

The $100,000 bill features a vignette portrait of President Woodrow Wilson. George Frederick Cumming Smillie did the engraving for the portrait of Woodrow Wilson on the obverse of the note.

On the obverse the following words appear: "This is to certify that there is on deposit in the Treasury of" on the upper portion of the note, followed by a cut-off on the lower portion, "the United States of America ... One hundred thousand dollars in gold payable to bearer on demand as authorized by law". "This certificate is legal tender in the amount thereof in payment of all debts and dues public and private" is further incorporated, located atop the Treasury seal. As a gold certificate, the bill exhibits little gold on the obverse: the Treasury seal and two serial numbers. The obverse also includes the words "Washington D.C." in a bolded font. The reverse exhibits orange ink rather than gold, with a large "100,000" in front of a dollar sign. Orange rays extend from the center.

The $100,000 bill is a part of the 1934 gold certificate series, comprising also $100, $1,000, and $10,000 notes.

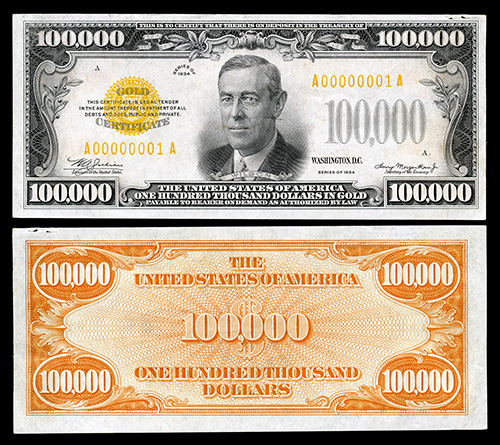
A 1934 issue of the $100,000 bill with the serial number A00000001A, as showcased in the National Museum of American History.

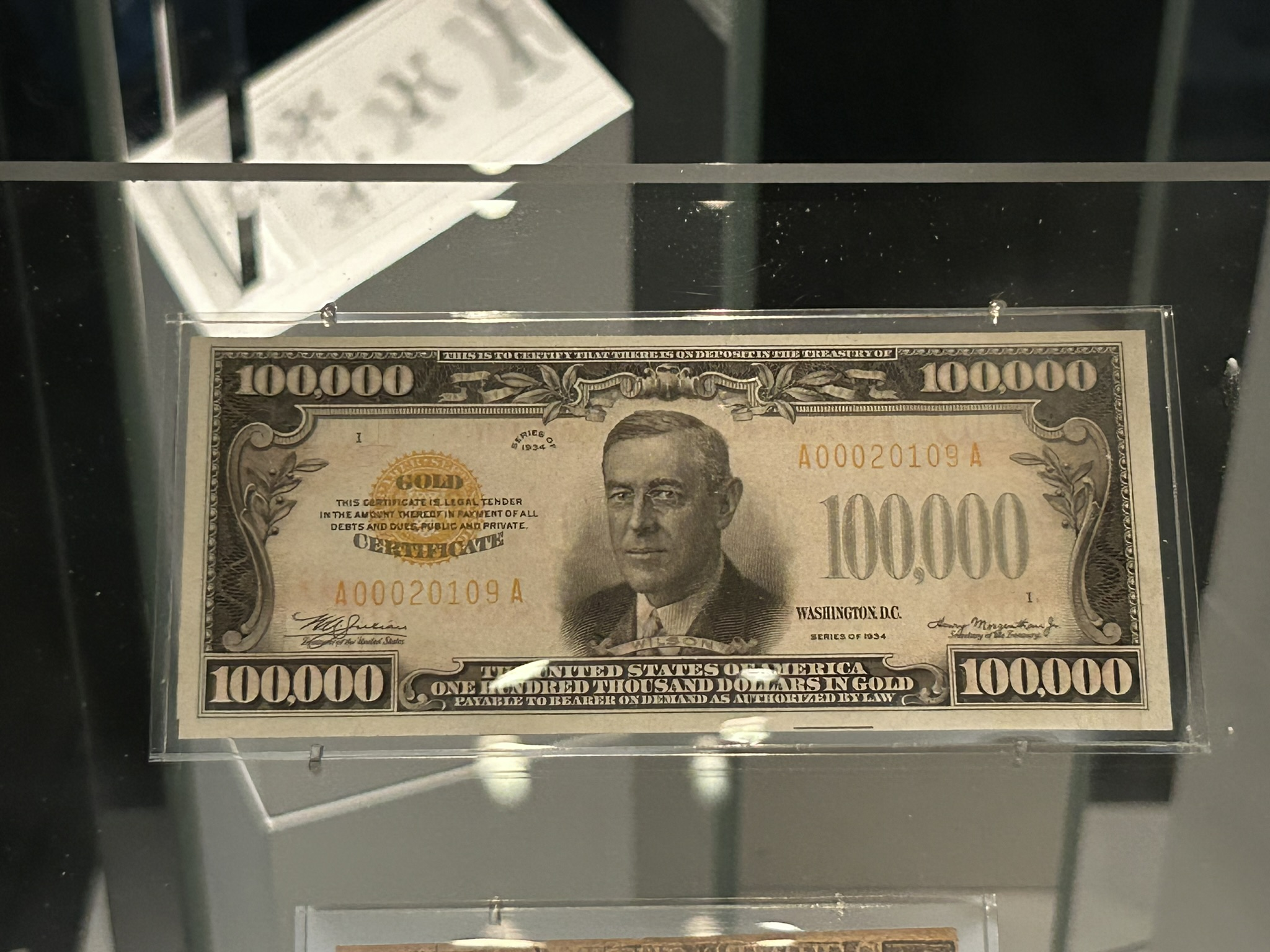
A Series 1934 issue of the $100,000 bill with the serial number A00020109A on display at the National Museum of American History in February 2024.

== See also ==
- Bank of England £1,000,000 note
- Bank of England £100,000,000 note
- Large denominations of United States currency
