= Bank of England note issues =

Banknotes issued by the Bank of England

- England and Wales (red-brown), where the Bank of England holds a monopoly, while its notes are also accepted in Scotland and Northern Ireland (both light red) alongside local banknotes

ISO 4217
- Code: GBP

Denominations
- Currency symbol: £
- Subunit: currently penny sterling (1/100); previously, until decimalisation on 15 February 1971, shilling sterling (1/20) and pre-decimal penny sterling (1/240)
- Subunit symbol: p (penny); s or /– (shilling); d (pre-decimal penny)
Banknotes
- Denominations: (currently) £5, £10, £20, £50

Demographics
- Solely used in: England; Wales; Tristan da Cunha
- Also used in: Scotland; Northern Ireland; Jersey; Guernsey; Isle of Man; South Georgia and the South Sandwich Islands

Issuance
- Issued by: Bank of England
- Printer: De La Rue

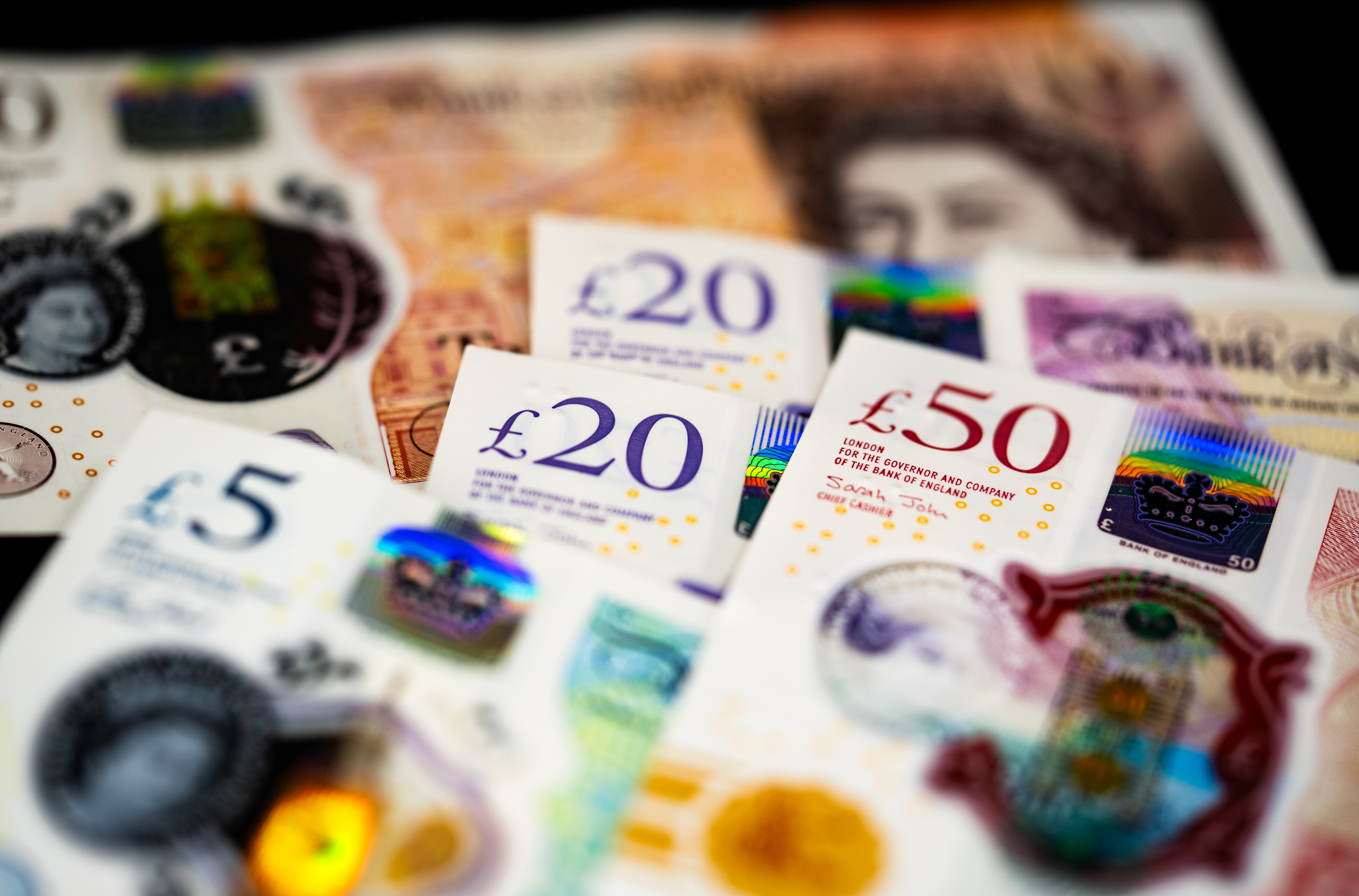
A collection of Bank of England banknotes

The Bank of England, the central bank of the United Kingdom, has issued banknotes since 1694. In 1921 it gained a legal monopoly on the issue of banknotes in England and Wales, a process that started with the Bank Charter Act 1844, when the power of other banks to issue notes was restricted. Only the Bank of England can issue banknotes in England and Wales, where its notes are legal tender. They are not legal tender in Scotland and Northern Ireland, but are accepted there by traders alongside their local notes.

Banknotes were originally hand-written; although they were partially printed from 1725 onwards, cashiers still had to sign each note and make them payable to someone. Notes were fully printed from 1855. The Bank of England now issues notes for circulation, all in polymer, in four denominations: £5, £10, £20, and £50.

Since 1970, the Bank of England's notes have featured portraits of British historical figures. In March 2026, the Bank announced that British wildlife and British birds are set to feature on the next series of notes.

== Current banknotes ==
As of 2026, there are four different circulating denominations of notes: £5, £10, £20, and £50 in the current series, series G. Each hold legal tender status in England and Wales, though this refers to the settlement of debts and retailers can refuse them. The notes have distinct colours, and the size of the notes increases in length and width as the value increases. They all feature a portrait of Elizabeth II or Charles III on the obverse. The Bank of England introduced its Series G set of banknotes between 2016 and 2021. Following the death of Elizabeth II in 2022, the Bank unveiled new notes, in the same design but featuring Charles III, on 20 December 2022. These notes entered circulation on 5 June 2024.

All current Bank of England banknotes are printed under contract by De La Rue at Debden, Essex. They include the printed signature of the Chief Cashier of the Bank of England and depict the British monarch in full view, facing left. They also include the EURion constellation, a pattern of yellow circles which stops copying of banknotes and is easily identified by photocopiers.

On 2 July 2025, the Bank of England launched a month-long consultation, seeking ideas from the public on replacing historical figures with new features on the next design of Series H banknotes. On 11 March 2026, The Bank announced that British wildlife and British birds are set to feature on its notes, with a public consultation inviting suggestions for the specific animals to be depicted.

The table below shows the notes currently in circulation. Two issue dates are given for each note: the first is for the Elizabeth II issue; the second date is for the Charles III issue.

Current banknotes (Series G), all in polymer
Image		Value	Dimensions (millimetres)	Main colour	Features of the reverse of the note	Issue dates	Further information
Obverse	Reverse	Value	Dimensions (millimetres)	Main colour	Features of the reverse of the note	Issue dates	Further information
		£5	125 × 65	Turquoise-Blue	The 1941 portrait of Winston Churchill by Yousuf Karsh; The Elizabeth Tower; The maze at Blenheim Palace; The quotation "I have nothing to offer but blood, toil, tears and sweat" from a 1940 speech by Churchill; The Nobel Prize medal.	13 September 2016 5 June 2024	This was the Bank of England's first banknote to be printed in polymer.
		£10	132 × 69	Orange	A portrait of author Jane Austen (c. 1810) by James Andrews, based on a portrait by her sister, Cassandra; The quotation "I declare after all there is no enjoyment like reading!" from Pride and Prejudice; An illustration of Elizabeth Bennet; A view of Godmersham Park in Kent.	14 September 2017 5 June 2024	
		£20	139 × 73	Purple	A self-portrait (c. 1799) of artist J. M. W. Turner; A version of Turner's The Fighting Temeraire; The quotation "Light is therefore colour" from an 1818 lecture by Turner; Turner's signature as made on his will.	20 February 2020 5 June 2024	
		£50	146 × 77	Red	A photograph of mathematician and computer scientist Alan Turing by Elliott & Fry; An image of Turing's Automatic Computing Engine; A table of formulae from Turing's 1936 work On Computable Numbers, with an application to the Entscheidungsproblem; The quotation "This is only a foretaste of what is to come and only the shadow of what is going to be" from Alan Turing, given in an interview to The Times on 11 June 1949.	23 June 2021 5 June 2024	Turing is the first known LGBT person to feature on a Bank of England banknote. This was the final Series G polymer note to be issued.

These images are to scale at 0.7 pixel per millimetre (18 pixel per inch). For table standards, see the banknote specification table.

== Withdrawn banknotes ==
Withdrawn Bank of England notes since Series D
Image	Value	Reverse portrait	Issued	Withdrawn
Series D
	10 shillings (50p)	Sir Walter Raleigh	Approved in 1964 but never issued	
	£1	Sir Isaac Newton	9 February 1978	11 March 1988
	£5	Arthur Wellesley, 1st Duke of Wellington	11 November 1971	29 November 1991
	£10	Florence Nightingale	20 February 1975	20 May 1994
	£20	William Shakespeare	9 July 1970	19 March 1993
	£50	Sir Christopher Wren	20 March 1981	20 September 1996
Series E
	£5	George Stephenson	7 June 1990	21 November 2003
	£10	Charles Dickens	29 April 1992	31 July 2003
	£20	Michael Faraday	5 June 1991	28 February 2001
	£50	Sir John Houblon	20 April 1994	30 April 2014
Series E (Variant)
	£5	Elizabeth Fry	21 May 2002	5 May 2017
	£10	Charles Darwin	7 November 2000	1 March 2018
	£20	Sir Edward Elgar	22 June 1999	20 June 2010
	£50	Never issued		
Series F
	£5	Never issued		
	£10	Never issued		
	£20	Adam Smith	13 March 2007	30 September 2022
	£50	Matthew Boulton and James Watt	2 November 2011	30 September 2022

Although Scotland, Northern Ireland and Channel Islands have £100 notes, the Bank of England has not issued them since 1945.

== History ==
The Bank of England now has a monopoly of note issue in England and Wales, but this has not always been the case. Until the middle of the 19th century, private banks in Great Britain and Ireland were free to issue their own banknotes, and notes issued by provincial banking companies were commonly in circulation. Over the years, various acts of Parliament were introduced in the United Kingdom to increase confidence in banknotes in circulation by limiting the rights of banks to issue notes.

=== Provincial banknote issues ===
Attempts to restrict banknote issue by banks other than the Bank of England began in 1708 and 1709, when acts of Parliament were passed which prohibited banking companies of more than six partners or shareholders. Notes under 1 guinea and 5 guineas were prohibited in the 1770s and thereafter almost all the provincial banks were established by the more substantial merchants, landed gentry etc. of a town and district.

=== Gold shortages ===
Gold shortages in the 18th century, caused by the Seven Years' War and war with Revolutionary France, began to affect the supply of gold bullion reserves, giving rise to the "Restriction period". The Bank of England was unable to pay out gold for its notes, and so under the Bank Restriction Act 1797 began to issue lower denomination £1 and £2 notes in place of gold guineas, that were hoarded as so often was the case in time of war. Confidence in the value of banknotes was rarely affected, except during 1809–11 and 1814–15 under the extreme conditions of war.

=== Restriction of banknote issues ===
The Country Bankers Act 1826 allowed some joint-stock banks outside London to issue notes, and also allowed the Bank of England to open branches in major provincial cities, enabling better distribution of its notes.

=== Introduction of legal tender ===
With the passing of the Bank Notes Act 1833, Bank of England notes over £5 in value were first given the status of "legal tender" in England and Wales, effectively guaranteeing the worth of the Bank's notes and ensuring public confidence in the notes in times of crisis or war. The Currency and Bank Notes Act 1954 extended the definition of legal tender to 10/– and £1 notes; unlike the 1833 act, this law also applied to Scotland, meaning that Bank of England notes under £5 were classed as legal tender. Due to inflation the Bank of England 10/– note was withdrawn in 1969 and the £1 was removed from circulation in 1988, leaving a legal curiosity in Scots law whereby there is now no paper legal tender in Scotland. (Notes issued by Scottish banks were not included in the 1833 or 1954 acts.)

=== Note-issuing monopoly ===
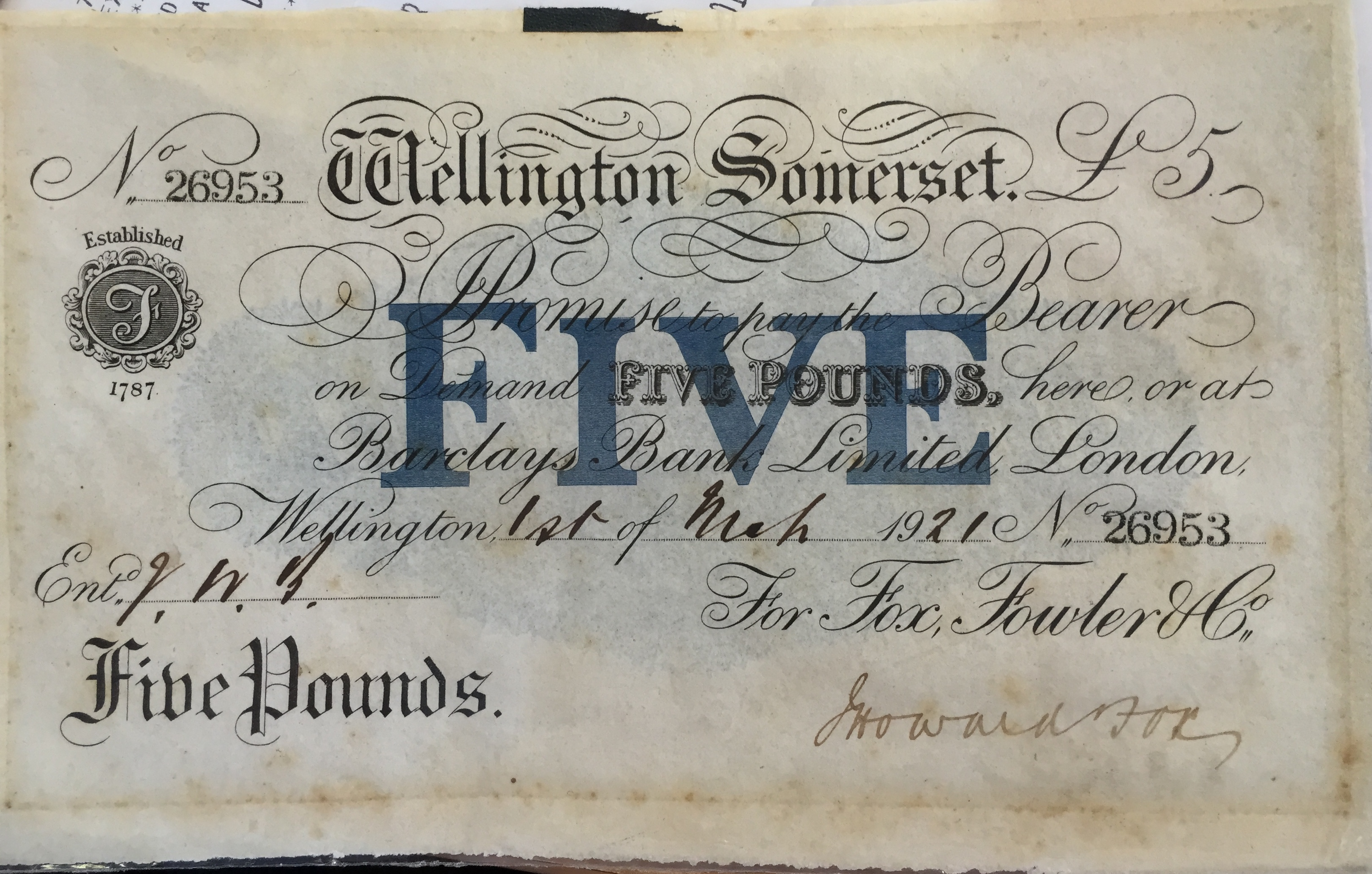
£5 note issued by the Fox, Fowler and Company bank in Wellington, Somerset

The Bank Charter Act 1844 began the process which gave the Bank of England exclusive note-issuing powers in England and Wales. Under the act, no new banks could start issuing notes, and note-issuing banks in England and Wales were barred from expanding their note issue. (Note: The limitations specified in section 11 of the 1844 act only refer to banks in England and Wales: "Restriction against issue of bank notes". Bank Charter Act 1844. HM Government/The National Archives (United Kingdom).) Gradually, these banks vanished through mergers, closures and take-overs, and their note issues went with them. The last privately issued banknotes in Wales were withdrawn in 1908, on the closure of the last Welsh bank, the North and South Wales Bank. The last private English banknotes were issued in 1921 by Fox, Fowler and Company, a Somerset bank, when it was bought out by Lloyds Bank. Under the terms of the Bank Charter Act 1844, the bank lost the legal right to issue banknotes when it merged with Lloyds, and the Bank of England became the sole note-issuing bank in England and Wales.

=== Note printing ===
Notes were originally handwritten; although they were partially printed from 1725 onwards, cashiers still had to sign each note and make them payable to someone. Notes were fully printed from 1855. Until 1928 all notes were the monochromatic Series A type, printed in black with a blank reverse. During the 20th century, notes in Series A were issued in denominations between £5 and £1,000, but in the 18th and 19th centuries there were Series A notes for £1 and £2.

=== 20th and 21st centuries ===
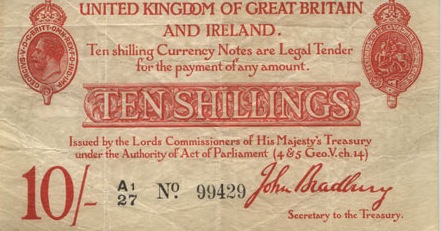
Obverse side of the 10/– Treasury note

The Bank of England's first issue of 10/– and £1 notes in the 20th century was on 22 November 1928 when it took over responsibility for these denominations from the Treasury. The Treasury had issued notes of these denominations at the start of the First World War in 1914 in order to supplant the sovereign and half-sovereign and remove gold coins from circulation. The notes issued by the Bank of England in 1928 were the first coloured banknotes and also the first notes to be printed on both sides.

The Second World War saw a reversal in the trend of warfare creating more notes when, in order to combat forgery, higher denomination notes (at the time as high as £1,000) were removed from circulation.

Until her death in 2022, Queen Elizabeth II had appeared on all the notes issued since Series C in 1960. The custom of depicting historical figures on the reverse began in 1970 with Series D, designed by the Bank of England's first permanent artist, Harry Eccleston.

== Denominations ==
Banknotes in various denominations have been issued over time. The denominations are listed in this table, using information from the Bank of England's Withdrawn Banknotes Reference Guide:

Denomination	First issued	Last issued	Notes
10 shillings (50p)	1928	1970	
£1	1797	1988	
£5	1793	Still in circulation	Series G notes are legal tender in England and Wales.
£10	1759	Still in circulation	Series G notes are legal tender in England and Wales.
£15	1759	1822	
£20	1725	Still in circulation	Series G notes are legal tender in England and Wales.
£25	1765	1822	
£30	1725	1852	
£40	1725	1851	
£50	1725	Still in circulation	Series G notes are legal tender in England and Wales. Legal tender refers to the settlement of debts, and many retailers do not accept £50 notes.
£60	1725	Before 1803	
£70	1725	Before 1803	
£80	1725	Before 1803	
£90	1725	Before 1803	
£100	1725	1943	Some of the Channel Islands and most of the Scottish and Northern Ireland banks still issue £100 notes.
£200	1725–45	1928	
£300	1725–45	1855	
£500	1725–45	1943	
£1,000	1725–45	1943	
£1,000,000	1943	1943	Non-circulating; used by the Bank to back Scottish and Northern Ireland notes. Not permitted to leave the Bank of England building in London.
£10,000,000			Non-circulating; used by the Bank to back Scottish and Northern Ireland notes. Not permitted to leave the Bank of England building in London.
£100,000,000			Non-circulating; used by the Bank to back Scottish and Northern Ireland notes. Not permitted to leave the Bank of England building in London.

=== 10/– ===
The Bank of England's first 10 shilling (10/–) note, issued on 22 November 1928, featured a vignette of Britannia, a feature of the Bank's notes since 1694. The predominant colour was red-brown. Unlike previous notes it, and the contemporaneous £1 note, were not dated but their approximate year of issue can be identified by the signature of the Chief Cashier of the time. In 1940 a metal security thread was introduced, and the colour of the note was changed to mauve for the duration of the Second World War. The original design of the note was replaced by the Series C design on 12 October 1961, when Queen Elizabeth II agreed to allow the use of her portrait on the notes.

As part of the planned Series D, which introduced historical figures, a new 10 shilling note featuring Sir Walter Raleigh was planned. This was to be issued as a 50 pence note in anticipation of the decimalisation of Britain's currency in 1971. However, inflation, particularly after the 1967 sterling devaluation, was eroding the note's lifespan in circulation and it was decided to replace it with a 50 pence coin, which was first issued in 1969. The 10 shilling note was withdrawn from circulation on 20 November 1970.

=== £1 ===
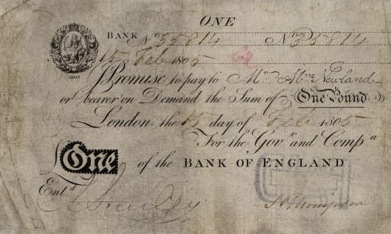
Series A £1 note, issued from London in 1805

The first Bank of England £1 note was issued on 2 March 1797 under the direction of Thomas Raikes, Governor of the Bank of England, and according to the orders of the government of William Pitt the Younger, in response to the need for smaller denomination banknotes to replace gold coin during the French Revolutionary Wars.

The Bank of England's first £1 note since 1845 was issued on 22 November 1928. This note featured a vignette of Britannia, a feature of the Bank's notes since 1694. The predominant colour was green. Unlike previous notes it, and the contemporaneous 10 shilling note, were not dated but their approximate year of issue can be identified by the signature of the Chief Cashier of the time. In 1940 a metal security thread was introduced, and the colour of the note was changed to blue and pink for the duration of the Second World War, to combat German counterfeits (see below).

The original design of the note was replaced by the Series C design on 17 March 1960, when Queen Elizabeth II agreed to allow the use of her portrait on the notes. The Series C £1 note was withdrawn on 31 May 1979. On 9 February 1978 the Series D design (known as the "Pictorial Series"), featuring Sir Isaac Newton on the reverse, was issued. However, like the 10 shilling note in the 1960s, inflation was quickly making production of the note uneconomic and printing was discontinued in favour of a coin. The note was withdrawn from circulation on 11 March 1988.

=== £5 ===
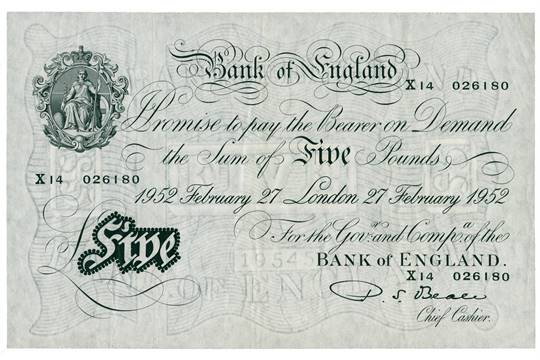
Series A Bank of England £5 note, issued in 1952

The first Bank of England £5 note was issued in 1793 in response to the need for smaller denomination banknotes to replace gold coin during the French Revolutionary Wars. (Previously the smallest note issued had been £10.) The 1793 design, latterly known as the "white fiver" (black printing on white paper), remained in circulation essentially unchanged until 21 February 1957 when the multicoloured (although predominantly dark blue) "Series B" note, depicting the helmeted Britannia, was introduced. The old "white fiver" was withdrawn on 13 March 1961.

The Series B note was replaced in turn on 21 February 1963 by the Series C £5 note which for the first time introduced the portrait of the monarch, Queen Elizabeth II, to the £5 note (the Queen's portrait having first appeared on the Series C ten shilling and £1 notes issued in 1960). The Series C £5 note was withdrawn on 31 August 1973.

On 11 November 1971, the Series D pictorial £5 note was issued, showing a portrait of the Queen looking slightly older and a battle scene featuring the Duke of Wellington on the reverse. It was withdrawn on 29 November 1991.

On 7 June 1990, the Series E £5 note, by now the smallest denomination issued by the Bank, was issued. For the Series E note (known as the "Historical Series") the denomination's colour was changed to a turquoise blue, and the note incorporated design elements to make photocopying and computer reproduction of it more difficult. Initially the reverse of the Series E £5 note featured the railway engineer George Stephenson, but on 21 May 2002 a new Series E note, in a green colour and featuring the prison reformer Elizabeth Fry, was issued.

The initial printing of several million Stephenson notes was destroyed when it was noticed that the wrong year for his death had been printed. The original issue of the Fry banknote was withdrawn after it was found that the ink on the serial number could be rubbed off the surface of the note; these notes are now very rare and sought by collectors. The Stephenson £5 note was withdrawn as legal tender from 21 November 2003, at which time it formed around 54 million of the 211 million £5 notes in circulation.

The F series £5 note was never issued. A newly designed £5 note, in Series G, featuring Winston Churchill, was introduced on 13 September 2016.

=== £10 ===
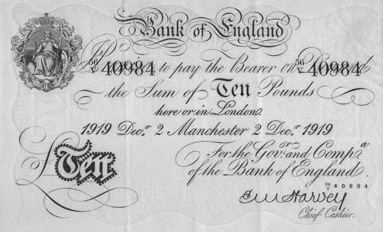
Series A £10 banknote, issued from Manchester in 1919

The first Bank of England £10 note was issued in 1759, when the Seven Years' War caused severe gold shortages. It ceased to be produced in 1943, during the Second World War. A string of devaluations through the late 1940s and 1950s meant increased demand for notes of higher values than £5 and, on 21 February 1964, a new brown-coloured note was issued in the Series C design. This Series C note was withdrawn on 31 May 1979.

The Series D pictorial note appeared on 20 February 1975, featuring nursing and public health pioneer Florence Nightingale (1820–1910) on the reverse, plus a scene showing her work at the army hospital in Scutari during the Crimean War. It was withdrawn on 20 May 1994.

On 29 April 1992, a new £10 note in Series E, with orange rather than brown as the dominant colour, was issued. The reverse featured author Charles Dickens and a scene from The Pickwick Papers. This note was withdrawn from circulation on 31 July 2003. A second Series E note was issued on 7 November 2000 featuring naturalist and biologist Charles Darwin, HMS Beagle, a hummingbird, and flowers under a magnifying glass, illustrating the Origin of Species. The hummingbird's inclusion was criticised, since Darwin's ideas were spurred by finches and mockingbirds, not hummingbirds. An F series £10 note was never issued.

A newly designed £10 banknote, featuring early 19th-century novelist Jane Austen, was issued on 14 September 2017. The decision to replace Darwin with Austen followed a campaign to have a woman on the back of a Bank of England banknote when it was announced that the only woman to feature on the back of a note — prison reformer Elizabeth Fry on the £5 note — was to be replaced by Winston Churchill. Like the £5 note featuring Churchill, the new £10 note is made from polymer rather than cotton paper.

=== £20 ===
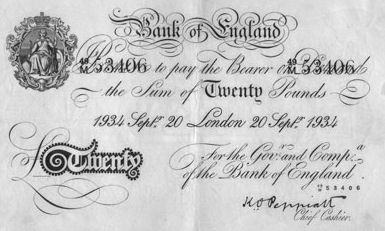
Series A £20 note, issued in 1934

£20 notes, in white, appeared in 1725 and continued to be issued until 1943. They ceased to be legal tender in 1945.

Following the devaluation of sterling in 1967, which increased demand for a higher denomination notes than £10, the Series D £20 note was introduced on 9 July 1970. It was predominantly purple and featured a statue of William Shakespeare and the balcony scene from Romeo and Juliet on its reverse. On 5 June 1991 this note was replaced by the first Series E £20 note, featuring the physicist Michael Faraday and the Royal Institution lectures. By 1999 this note had been extensively counterfeited, and therefore it became the first denomination to be replaced on 22 June 1999 by a second Series E design, featuring a bolder denomination figure at the top left of the obverse side, and a reverse side featuring the composer Sir Edward Elgar and Worcester Cathedral.

In February 2006, the Bank announced a new design for the £20 note, featuring Scottish economist Adam Smith with a drawing of a pin factory – the institution which supposedly inspired his theory of economics. Smith was the first Scot to appear on a Bank of England note, although the economist had already appeared on Scottish Clydesdale Bank £50 notes. The design of the £20 note was controversial for two reasons: the choice of a Scottish figure on an English note was a break with tradition; and the removal of Elgar took place in the year of the 150th anniversary of the composer's birth, prompting a group of English MPs to table a motion in the House of Commons calling for the new design to be delayed. The new note entered circulation on 13 March 2007. The Elgar note ceased to be legal tender on 30 June 2010.

A new polymer £20 note, featuring the artist J. M. W. Turner, was issued in 2020.

=== £50 ===
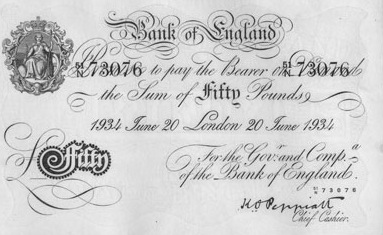
Series A £50 note, issued in 1934

Series A £50 notes appeared in 1725 and continued to be issued until 1943. They ceased to be legal tender in 1945.

The Series D £50 note was released on 20 March 1981 featuring the architect Christopher Wren and the plan of St Paul's Cathedral on the reverse. In 1994 this denomination was the last of the first Series E issue, when the Bank commemorated its 300th birthday by featuring its first governor, Sir John Houblon, on the reverse. The old Series D £50 note was withdrawn from circulation on 20 September 1996. The E revision series did not have a £50 note.

In May 2009, the Bank of England announced a new design in Series F, featuring James Watt, Matthew Boulton, the Whitbread Engine and Soho Manufactory. It entered circulation on 2 November 2011 and is the first Bank of England note to feature two portraits on the reverse. The predominant colour of this denomination banknote is red. This note includes a security feature not present in the other denominations (though it is by no means the only security feature in any of the notes). The interwoven thread ("Motion") is a hologram whose image of a green circle with a "£" sign alternates with a green "50" as the note is rotated. If the note is rotated, the image appears to move up and down, in the opposite plane to the rotation.

A new polymer £50 note, featuring Alan Turing, was issued on 23 June 2021.

=== £100 and £500 ===
£100 notes have not been issued by the Bank of England since 1945, but they are issued by some banks in the Channel Islands, Scotland and Northern Ireland. A £500 note, issued by the Bank of England's Leeds branch in 1936, fetched £24,000 at auction in 2023.

=== £500,000 ===
The Bank of England held money on behalf of other countries and issued Treasury bills to cover such deposits, on Bank of England paper. Examples include a note issued in London on behalf of the Royal Romanian Government on 21 January 1915, payable on 21 January 1916, for £500,000, and a similar Treasury bill, dated 22 April 1927 and payable on 22 April 1928. These exist in private hands as cancelled specimens.

=== £1,000,000, £10,000,000 and £100,000,000 ===
The banknotes issued by commercial banks in Scotland and Northern Ireland are required to be backed pound for pound by Bank of England notes. High denomination notes, for £1 million ("Giants") and £100 million ("Titans"), were used for this purpose. They were used only internally within the Bank and were never seen in circulation. They were based on a much older design of banknote, and are A5 and A4 sized respectively. However, the need for these large notes has been obviated by section 217(2)(c) of the Banking Act 2009.

Nine £1 million notes were issued in connection with the Marshall Plan on 30 August 1948, signed by E. E. Bridges, and were used internally as "records of movement", for a six-week period (along with other denominations, with total face value of £300,000,000, corresponding to a loan from the US to help shore up HM Treasury).

These were cancelled on 6 October 1948, and presumably destroyed, except for the £1,000,000 "Number Seven" and "Number Eight" notes (serial numbers 000007 and 000008), which were given to the British and American Treasury Secretaries. These two have been in private hands since 1977, and most recently, the "Number Eight" was auctioned for £69,000. These are "Treasury Notes" issued on Bank of England paper, and they state: "This Treasury note entitles the Bank of England to payment of one million pounds on demand out of the Consolidated Fund of the United Kingdom." A third note surfaced on the collector market, dated 8 September 2003 and with the serial number R016492; it is signed by Andrew Turnbull, Secretary to the Treasury, and cancelled.

A £10,000,000 Treasury Bill, stamped "cancelled", sold for £17,000 at auction in London on 29 September 2014 by Dix Noonan Webb.

Until 2006, these Treasury Notes were issued by the Bank of England, in the City of London. HM Treasury would manage its cash and ensure that adequate funds were available. London's banks and other financial institutions would bid for these instruments, at a discount, specifying which day the following week they wanted the bills issued. The term of the bills would be one, three, six or, theoretically but not in practice, twelve months. The tenders were for the face value of the Treasury Notes, less a discount, which represented the interest rate. This system was replaced by a computerised system managed by the Debt Management Office, an executive agency of the Treasury, and the last Treasury Notes were printed in September 2003.

These notes would often get traded to other banks, so they did circulate; this was done without the Bank of England's knowledge, and the notes would be redeemed by the bank on their date of maturity by the bearer. The circulating nature of the notes led to the City bonds robbery on 2 May 1990, when John Goddard, a messenger for the firm Sheppards, was mugged of £292 million in Treasury bills and certificates of deposit. All but two of these bonds were eventually recovered.

The Bank of England £100,000,000 note, also referred to as Titan, is a non-circulating sterling banknote used to guarantee the value of the notes issued by commercial banks in Scotland and Northern Ireland.

== Counterfeited and withdrawn notes ==
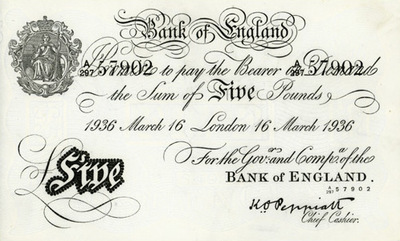
An Operation Bernhard forgery of the Series A Bank of England £5 note

William Booth, of South Staffordshire, was a notable forger of English banknotes, and was hanged for the crime in 1812. Several of his forgeries and printing plates are in the collection of Birmingham Museum and Art Gallery.

After the start of the World War II in September 1939 the German Operation Bernhard attempted to counterfeit various denominations between £5 and £50. Although the plans were classified, in November Michael Palairet, Britain's ambassador to Greece, obtained full details of them from a Russian émigré and reported them to London. Although the Bank considered the existing security measures to be sufficient, in 1940 it released emergency notes with different colour schemes and a magnetic security thread running through the paper.

The original plan was to parachute or smuggle the counterfeit notes into Britain in an attempt to destabilise the British economy, but in 1942 Heinrich Himmler decided it was more useful to use the notes to pay German agents operating throughout Europe, and in 1943 they were producing 500,000 notes monthly. Although most fell into Allied hands at the end of the war and were destroyed, forgeries frequently appeared for years afterwards, so all denominations of banknote above £5 were subsequently removed from circulation. The incident is alluded to in Ian Fleming's James Bond novel Goldfinger.

All banknotes, regardless of when they were withdrawn from circulation, may be presented at the Bank of England where they will be exchanged for current banknotes and coins. In practice, commercial banks will accept most banknotes from their customers and negotiate them with the Bank of England themselves. However, forgeries (including Bernhard notes) will be retained and destroyed by the Bank. If a suspect note is found to be genuine a full refund by cheque will be made. However, it is a criminal offence to knowingly hold or pass a counterfeit bank note without lawful authority or excuse.

== In popular culture ==
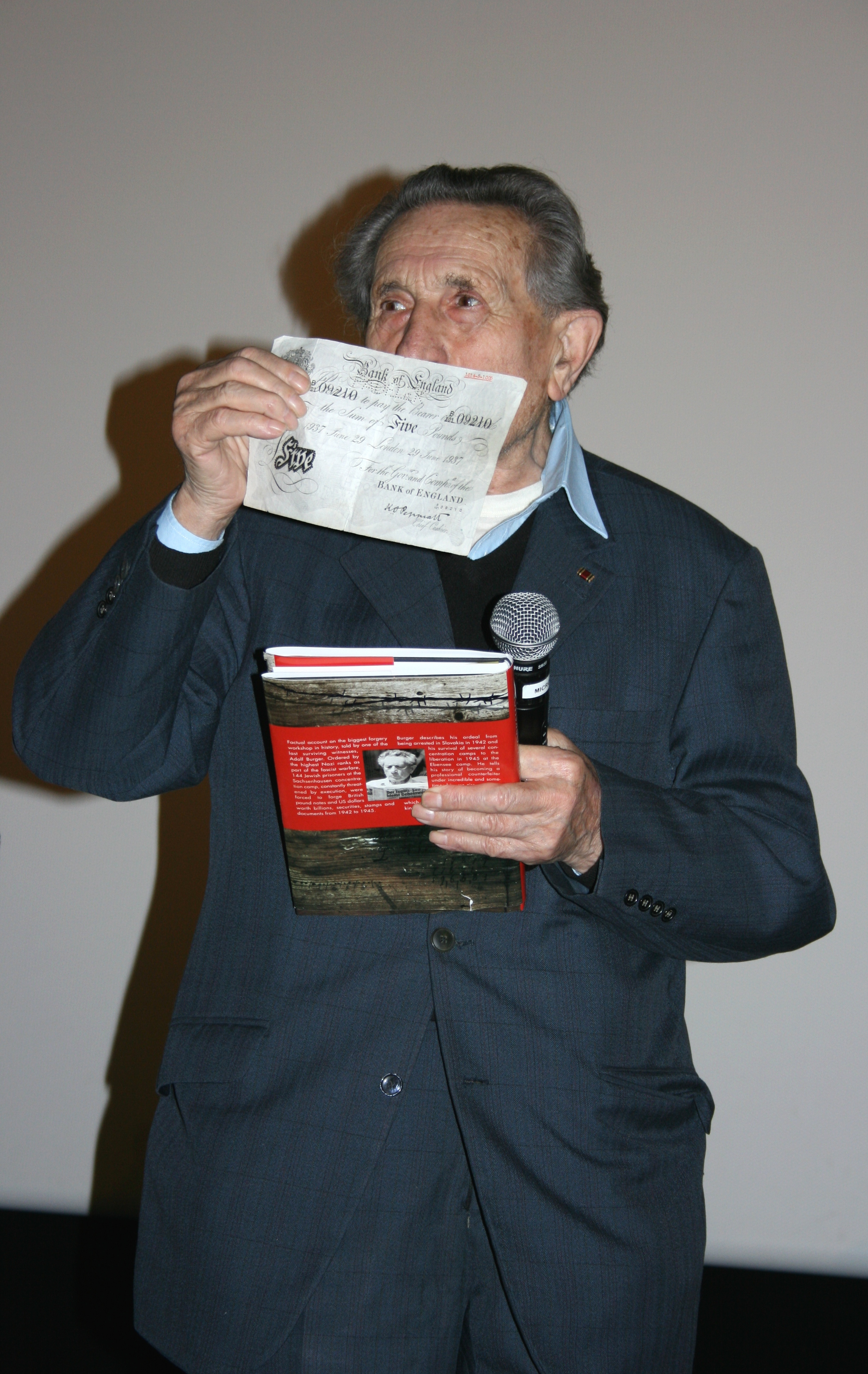
Adolf Burger displaying a forged £5 note at the Paris première of Die Fälscher, January 2008

- The 2007 Austrian-German film The Counterfeiters (Die Fälscher) tells the story of Salomon Sorowitsch (real name Salomon Smolianoff), a Jewish forger who is put to work forging Bank of England notes on Operation Bernhard in Sachsenhausen concentration camp. On 13 March 2009 BBC Radio 4 broadcast The Counterfeiter's Tale, a 30-minute partly dramatised documentary about the production of the notes in Sachsenhausen. It was re-broadcast by Radio 4 Extra on 25 November 2015.
- Mark Twain's 1893 short story "The Million Pound Bank Note" deals with an impoverished American in London who is given the use of a £1,000,000 Bank of England note for thirty days by two wealthy gentlemen betting whether or not he will be able to survive on a note for which he cannot possibly be given change. He does succeed in surviving on the note's promise to pay and marries one of the bettors' daughters. The story was also made into a 1953 film, The Million Pound Note starring Gregory Peck, and was parodied in a 1998 episode of The Simpsons, "The Trouble with Trillions".
- A fictionalised version of the Operation Bernhard story was the topic of a comedy drama serial Private Schulz (starring Michael Elphick and Ian Richardson), broadcast on BBC Two in 1981.
- The 2001 British TV film Hot Money, starring Caroline Quentin, tells the story of three workers at the Bank who devise a method of stealing from the cages containing old notes waiting to be destroyed.

== See also ==
- Currency and Bank Notes Act 1928
- Banknotes of the pound sterling
